= Haemophilia in European royalty =

Genetic disorder in European royalty

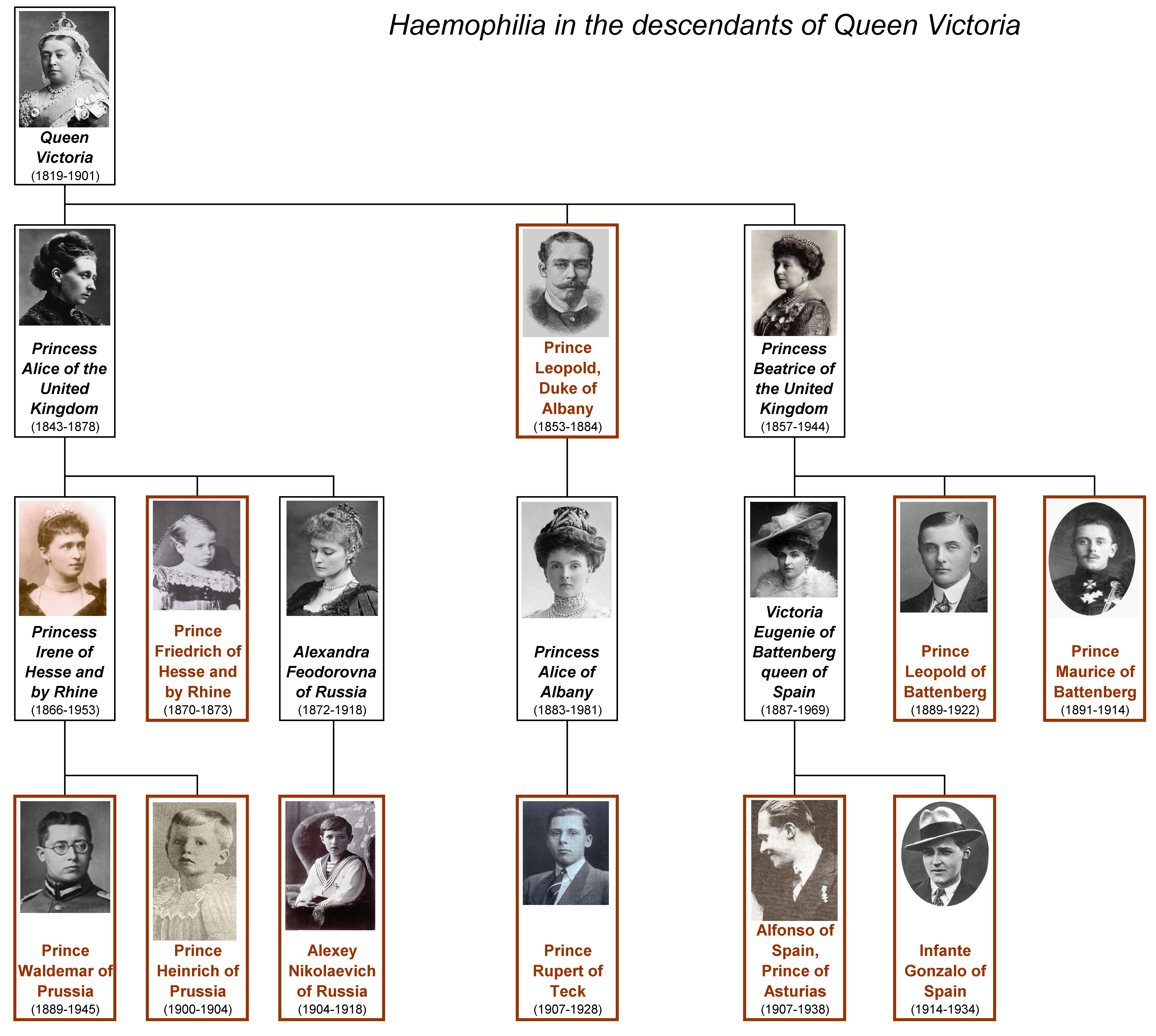
Queen Victoria's descendants with haemophilia and known female carriers

Inheritance by female carriers

Haemophilia figured prominently in the history of European royalty in the 19th and 20th centuries. Queen Victoria and her husband, Prince Albert of the United Kingdom, through two of their five daughters – Princess Alice and Princess Beatrice – passed the mutation to various royal houses across the continent, including the royal families of Spain, Germany and Russia. Victoria's youngest son, Prince Leopold, Duke of Albany, also had the disease, though none of her three elder sons did. Tests on the remains of the Romanov imperial family show that the specific form of haemophilia passed down by Queen Victoria was probably the relatively rare haemophilia B. The presence of haemophilia B within the European royal families was well known, with the condition once popularly termed the 'royal disease.'

== Genetic inheritance of haemophilia ==
The sex-linked X-chromosome bleeding disorder manifests almost exclusively in males, even though the genetic mutation causing the disorder is located on the X-chromosome and can be inherited from the mother by male children or from either mother or father by female children. This is because the trait is recessive, meaning that only one correctly functioning copy of the blood-clotting factor gene is necessary for normal clotting. Females have two X-chromosomes, and hence redundant copies of the blood-clotting factor gene located on them. A female who inherits a mutated copy on one X-chromosome has also inherited a second X-chromosome from the other parent that is likely to carry a non-mutated copy of the gene, capable of directing appropriate clotting. Such a female, with normal clotting but possessing a single mutated copy of the gene, is called a carrier. Males possess only a single X-chromosome, inherited from their mother, having received a Y-chromosome from their fathers instead of a second X. If their sole X-chromosome contains the haemophilia mutation they possess no second copy to provide for normal function, as in carrier females. Each child of a carrier will have a 50 percent chance of inheriting their mother's mutation, of being a haemophiliac (sons) or carrier (daughters). The daughter of a male haemophiliac will always inherit his mutation, while a son cannot ever inherit it. A female will be affected with haemophilia proper only in the rare circumstance that she inherits mutated X-chromosomes from both a haemophiliac father and a carrier or a haemophiliac mother. No case of such double inheritance is known among Queen Victoria's descendants, although there has been at least one symptomatic carrier.

Although an individual's haemophilia can usually be traced in the ancestry, in about 30 percent of cases, there is no family history of the disorder, and the condition is speculated to be the result of spontaneous mutation in an ancestor. Victoria's appears to have been a spontaneous or de novo mutation, most likely inherited from one of her parents, and she is usually considered the source of the disease in modern cases of haemophilia among her descendants. Queen Victoria's mother, Victoria, Duchess of Kent, was not known to have a family history of the disease, although it is possible that she was a carrier, but among her three children only Victoria received the mutated copy. Queen Victoria's father, Prince Edward, Duke of Kent, was not a haemophiliac, but the mutation may have arisen as a germ-line mutation within him. The rate of spontaneous mutation is known to increase with paternal age (and is higher in fathers than in mothers at all ages); Victoria's father was 51 at her birth. The probability of Victoria's mother having had a lover with haemophilia is minuscule, given the low life expectancy of early 19th-century haemophiliacs, as well as the otherwise low possibility of illegitimacy in this instance.

== Queen Victoria's family tree ==
=== Children ===
- Victoria, German Empress (1840–1901) Issue: Wilhelm II of Germany, Charlotte, Duchess of Saxe-Meiningen, Prince Henry of Prussia, Prince Sigismund of Prussia, Viktoria, Princess Adolf of Schaumburg-Lippe, Prince Waldemar of Prussia, Sophia, Queen of the Hellenes, Margaret, Landgravine of Hesse-Kassel
- Edward VII, King of the United Kingdom (1841–1910) Issue: Prince Albert Victor, Duke of Clarence and Avondale, George V, Louise, Princess Royal, Princess Victoria, Maud, Queen of Norway, Prince Alexander John
- Princess Alice, Grand Duchess of Hesse and by Rhine (1843–1878) Issue: Victoria Mountbatten, Marchioness of Milford Haven, Grand Duchess Elizabeth Feodorovna of Russia, Irene, Princess Henry of Prussia, Ernest Louis, Grand Duke of Hesse and by Rhine, Prince Friedrich, Alexandra Feodorovna, Empress of Russia, Princess Marie of Hesse and by Rhine
- Prince Alfred, Duke of Saxe-Coburg and Gotha (1844–1900) Issue: Alfred, Hereditary Prince of Saxe-Coburg and Gotha, Marie, Queen of Romania, Grand Duchess Victoria Feodrovna of Russia, Alexandra, Princess of Hohenlohe-Langenburg, Princess Beatrice, Duchess of Galliera
- Helena, Princess Christian of Schleswig-Holstein (1846–1923) Issue: Prince Christian Victor, Albert, Duke of Schleswig-Holstein, Princess Helena Victoria, Princess Marie Louise, Prince Harald
- Princess Louise, Duchess of Argyll (1848–1939) No issue
- Prince Arthur, Duke of Connaught and Strathearn (1850–1942) Issue: Margaret, Crown Princess of Sweden, Prince Arthur of Connaught, Lady Patricia Ramsay
- Prince Leopold, Duke of Albany (1853–1884) Issue: Princess Alice, Countess of Athlone, Charles Edward, Duke of Saxe-Coburg and Gotha
- Beatrice, Princess Henry of Battenberg (1857–1944) Issue: Alexander Mountbatten, 1st Marquess of Carisbrooke, Victoria Eugenie, Queen of Spain, Lord Leopold Mountbatten, Prince Maurice of Battenberg

Queen Victoria's eldest daughter, Victoria, Princess Royal, apparently escaped the haemophilia gene, as it did not appear in any of her matrilineal descendants. Victoria's fifth child, Princess Helena, may or may not have been a carrier; two healthy sons survived to adulthood, but one son died in infancy, another was stillborn, and her two daughters did not have issue. Victoria's sixth child, Princess Louise, died without issue. Queen Victoria's sons Edward VII, Alfred, Duke of Saxe-Coburg and Gotha, and Prince Arthur, Duke of Connaught and Strathearn were not haemophiliacs; however, her daughters Alice and Beatrice were confirmed carriers of the gene, and Victoria's son Leopold had haemophilia, making his daughter Princess Alice, Countess of Athlone a carrier as well.

Haemophilia in European royalty

Queen Victoria; Xx	Albert; XY
Victoria; X?	Edward VII; XY	Alice; Xx	Louis IV; XY	Alfred; XY	Helena; X?	Louise; X?	Arthur; XY	Leopold xY	Helen; XX	Beatrice; Xx	Henry; XY
Victoria; X?	Elisabeth; X?	Irene; Xx	Henry; XY	Ernest Louis; XY	Frederick xY	Alix; Xx	Nicholas II; XY	Alice; Xx	Alexander; XY
Waldemar xY	Sigismund; XY	Henry xY	Olga; XX?	Tatiana; XX?	Maria; Xx?	Anastasia; XX?	Alexei xY
May; X?	Rupert xY	Maurice; XY
Alexander; XY	Victoria Eugenie; Xx	Alfonso XIII; XY	Leopold xY	Maurice; XY
Alfonso xY	Jaime; XY	Beatriz; X?	Maria Cristina; X?	Juan; XY	Gonzalo xY

Legend: X – unaffected X chromosome; x – affected X chromosome; Y – Y chromosome; ? - unknown carrier status
Source: Aronova-Tiuntseva, Yelena; Herreid, Clyde Freeman (20 September 2003). "Hemophilia: 'The Royal Disease'" (PDF). SciLinks. National Science Teachers Association. p. 7. Archived from the original (PDF) on 10 January 2018.

== Princess Alice ==
Alice (1843–1878), Victoria's third child, and wife of the future Grand Duke Louis IV of Hesse and by Rhine (1837–1892), passed it on to at least three of her children: Irene, Friedrich, and Alix.

- Princess Victoria of Hesse and by Rhine (1863–1950), later Marchioness of Milford Haven, wife of Prince Louis of Battenberg (1854–1921) and maternal grandmother to Prince Philip, Duke of Edinburgh, apparently was not a carrier.
- Princess Elizabeth of Hesse and by Rhine (1864–1918), later Grand Duchess Elizabeth Feodorovna of Russia through her marriage to Grand Duke Sergei Alexandrovich (1857–1905), may or may not have been a carrier. Following her husband's assassination, she became a nun and was childless when killed by the Bolsheviks in 1918.
- Princess Irene of Hesse and by Rhine (1866–1953), later Princess Heinrich of Prussia, through her marriage to Prince Heinrich of Prussia (1862–1929), passed it on to two of her three sons:
  - Prince Waldemar of Prussia (1889–1945). Survived to age 56; had no issue.
  - Prince Henry of Prussia (1900–1904). Died at age 4.
- Prince Friedrich of Hesse and by Rhine (1870–1873). Died before his third birthday of bleeding on the brain resulting from a fall from a third-story window (which would almost certainly have not been fatal if he had not had haemophilia).
- Princess Alix of Hesse and by Rhine (1872–1918), later Empress Alexandra Feodorovna of Russia through her marriage to Tsar Nicholas II (1868–1918). Alix had a marriage proposal from her first cousin, Prince Albert Victor (1864–1892), eldest son of the then Prince of Wales (later King Edward VII); had she accepted, haemophilia could have returned to the direct line of succession in the United Kingdom.
  - Grand Duchess Maria Nikolaevna (1899–1918), Nicholas and Alexandra's third daughter, was thought by some to have been a symptomatic carrier because she haemorrhaged during a tonsillectomy. DNA testing of the Romanov family remains in 2009 showed that one of the four daughters, thought to be Maria by American researchers and Anastasia by Russian researchers, was a carrier.
  - Tsarevich Alexei (1904–1918) was murdered with his family by the Bolsheviks at the age of 13. Alexei's haemophilia was one of the factors contributing to the collapse of Imperial Russia during the Russian Revolution of 1917.
- Princess Marie of Hesse and by Rhine (1874–1878), Alice's seventh and last child, may or may not have been a carrier. She died of diphtheria at the age of four.

== Prince Leopold ==
Leopold (1853–1884), Victoria's eighth child, was the first member of the family to manifest haemophilia; he died at age 30 from bleeding after a minor fall, only two years after marrying Princess Helen of Waldeck and Pyrmont (1861–1922).

He passed the gene on to his only daughter:

- Princess Alice of Albany (1883–1981), later Countess of Athlone, who in turn passed it on to her elder son:
  - Prince Rupert of Teck (1907–1928), later Rupert Cambridge, Viscount Trematon, who died at age 20, bleeding to death after a car accident.

Alice's younger son Prince Maurice of Teck died in infancy, so it is not known if he was a carrier of the gene. Her daughter Lady May Abel Smith (1906–1994), Leopold's granddaughter, has living descendants none of whom has been known to have or to transmit haemophilia.

Leopold's posthumous son, Charles Edward (1884–1954), was unaffected, as a father cannot pass the gene to a son.

== Princess Beatrice ==
Beatrice (1857–1944), Victoria's ninth and last child, and wife of Prince Henry of Battenberg (1858–1896) passed it on to at least two, if not three, of her four children:

- Princess Victoria Eugenie of Battenberg (1887–1969), later Queen Victoria Eugenia of Spain through her marriage to King Alfonso XIII (1886–1940), who passed it on to:
  - Infante Alfonso, Prince of Asturias (1907–1938). Died at age 31, bleeding to death after a car accident.
  - Infante Gonzalo (1914–1934). Died at age 19, bleeding to death after a car accident.
  - Victoria Eugenie's two daughters, Infantas Beatriz (1909–2002) and Maria Cristina of Spain (1911–1996), both have living descendants none of whom has been known to have or to transmit haemophilia.
- Prince Leopold of Battenberg (1889–1922); later Lord Leopold Mountbatten. Died at age 32 during a hip operation.
- Prince Maurice of Battenberg (1891–1914). Killed in action in World War I at the age of 23. Maurice's haemophilia is disputed by various sources. It seems unlikely that a known haemophiliac would be allowed to serve in combat.

== Today ==
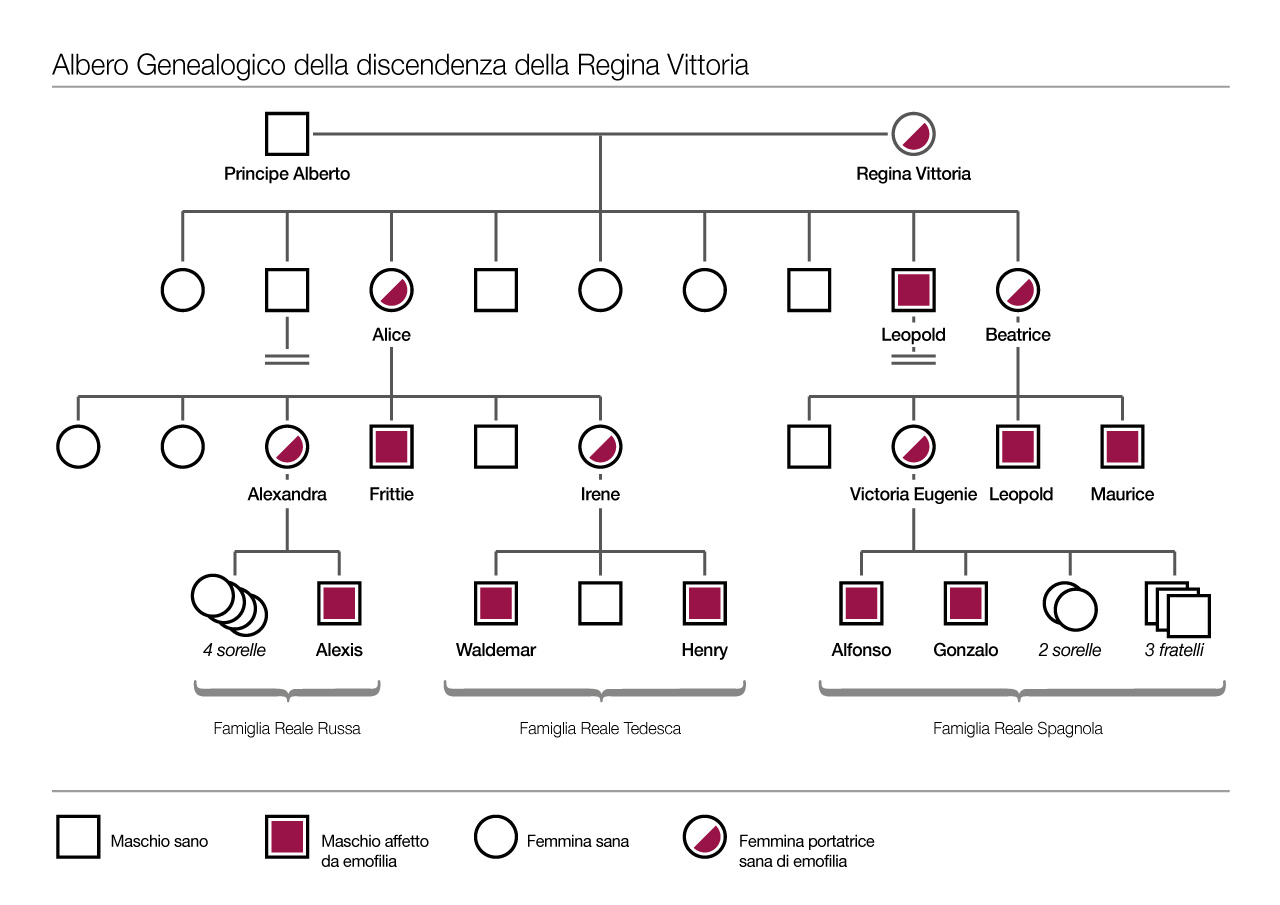

No living member of the present or past reigning dynasties of Europe is known to have symptoms of haemophilia or is believed to carry the gene for it. The last descendant of Victoria known to have the disease was Infante Gonzalo, born in 1914, although hundreds of descendants of Queen Victoria's (including males descended only through females) have been born since 1914. However, because the haemophilia gene usually remains hidden in females who only inherit the gene from one parent, and female descendants of Victoria have left many descendants in royal and noble families, there remains a small chance that the disease could appear again.

== Chronological order ==
Queen Victoria died in 1901 and outlived her youngest son and a grandson, both of whom had the disease. The gene can be passed down a female line without a haemophiliac son being born, but the longer a family line continues with no haemophiliac males being born, the less likely it becomes that a certain ancestor had the gene and passed it on through the female line.

Men who had haemophilia in order of death
#	Name	Death	Relation to Queen Victoria
1	Prince Friedrich of Hesse and by Rhine	29 May 1873 (aged 2)	grandson
2	Prince Leopold, Duke of Albany	28 March 1884 (aged 30)	son
3	Prince Henry of Prussia	26 February 1904 (aged 4)	great-grandson
4	Tsarevich Alexei of Russia	17 July 1918 (aged 13)	great-grandson
5	Lord Leopold Mountbatten	23 April 1922 (aged 32)	grandson
6	Rupert Cambridge, Viscount Trematon	15 April 1928 (aged 20)	great-grandson
7	Infante Gonzalo of Spain	13 August 1934 (aged 19)	great-grandson
8	Alfonso, Prince of Asturias	6 September 1938 (aged 31)	great-grandson
9	Prince Waldemar of Prussia	2 May 1945 (aged 56)	great-grandson

== Type of haemophilia discovered ==
Because the last known descendant of Queen Victoria with haemophilia died a few months before the end of WWII, in 1945, the exact type of haemophilia found in this family remained unknown until 2009. Using genetic analysis of the remains of the assassinated Romanov dynasty, specifically those of Tsarevich Alexei, Rogaev et al. were able to determine that it was haemophilia B. Specifically, they found a single-nucleotide change in the gene for clotting Factor IX that causes incorrect RNA splicing and produces a truncated, nonfunctional protein.

== References and external links ==
- Potts, D. M. Queen Victoria's Gene. Sutton Publishing, 1999. ISBN 0-7509-1199-9.
- "Hemophilia: The Royal Disease" Yelena Aronova-Tiuntseva and Clyde Freeman Herreid
- Family tree of Queen Victoria and her descendants
- Haemophilia in Queen Victoria's Descendants.
- Victor A. McKusick (August 1965). "The Royal Hemophilia". Scientific American. pp. 88–95.
