= Prince Henry of Battenberg =

German prince and member of the British royal family (1858–1896)

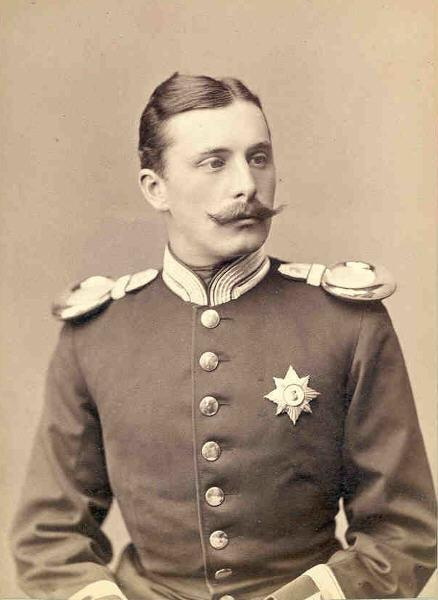
- Prince Henry c. 1885
- Born: 5 October 1858; Milan, Lombardy–Venetia, Austrian Empire
- Died: 20 January 1896 (aged 37); HMS Blonde, near Sierra Leone
- Burial: 5 February 1896; St. Mildred's Church, Whippingham, Isle of Wight
- Spouse: Princess Beatrice of the United Kingdom (m. 1885)
- Issue: Alexander Mountbatten, 1st Marquess of Carisbrooke; Victoria Eugenie, Queen of Spain; Lord Leopold Mountbatten; Prince Maurice of Battenberg
- Family: Battenberg
- Father: Prince Alexander of Hesse and by Rhine
- Mother: Julia, Princess of Battenberg

Prince Henry of Battenberg (Henry Maurice; 5 October 1858 – 20 January 1896), formerly Count Henry of Battenberg, was a German prince who became a member of the British royal family by marriage to Princess Beatrice, the youngest child of Queen Victoria. He was the son of Prince Alexander of Hesse and by Rhine, but did not belong to the House of Hesse because his mother, Countess Julia von Hauke, was of a lower rank. He moved to the United Kingdom when he married Beatrice in 1885 and became governor of the Isle of Wight in 1894. He died of malaria on his way to fight in the Ashanti War.

== Early life ==
Henry was born on 5 October 1858 in Milan, Lombardy–Venetia. He was the son of Prince Alexander of Hesse and by Rhine, and his wife, Countess Julia von Hauke. His father was the third son and fourth child of Grand Duke Ludwig II of Hesse and Wilhelmina of Baden.

His parents' marriage was morganatic, as Julia was considered of unequal rank to a prince of a reigning dynasty, being only a countess. As such, at the time of his birth, Henry could not bear his father's title or name, and was styled His Illustrious Highness Count Henry of Battenberg. He was known as 'Liko' to his family. The name 'Liko' came from a nanny who called him 'Enrico' or 'Rico", and his brother Sandro, who was a toddler at the time, pronounced it as 'Liko'. When his mother was raised to Princess von Battenberg and given the higher style of Her Serene Highness by Alexander's older brother, Louis III, Grand Duke of Hesse, Henry and his siblings shared in their mother's new rank. He became His Serene Highness Prince Henry of Battenberg, although he remained ineligible to inherit the throne of Hesse.

Henry received a military education and took up a commission as a lieutenant in the 1st Regiment of the Rhenish Hussars in the Prussian Army. He served in the Prussian Garde du Corps and was also Honorary Colonel of the 1st Infantry Regiment of Bulgaria, where his brother Alexander was Prince.

== Marriage ==
Because of their close relationship to the Grand Ducal House of Hesse, the Battenbergs came into close contact with various ruling families of Europe, including the British. In April 1884, Henry's elder brother, Prince Louis of Battenberg, married Princess Victoria of Hesse and by Rhine, his first cousin once-removed, and a granddaughter of Queen Victoria of the United Kingdom. Shortly after that wedding, Prince Henry became engaged to Princess Beatrice, fifth daughter and youngest child of Queen Victoria. Queen Victoria agreed to the marriage on the condition that the couple make their home with her. The Queen formally gave her consent to the marriage at a meeting of Her Majesty's Most Honourable Privy Council on 27 January 1885.

On 22 July 1885, the Queen made Prince Henry a Knight Companion of the Garter, and granted him the style Royal Highness to give him rank equal to his wife. This style took effect in the United Kingdom, but not in the German Empire (where the Prince was still considered a Serene Highness).

Henry and Beatrice were married at St Mildred's Church at Whippingham, near Osborne, on 23 July 1885. On the same day, a bill to naturalise Henry a British subject passed the House of Lords. The couple adopted the style Their Royal Highnesses Prince and Princess Henry of Battenberg.

On 22 August 1885, exactly a month after the wedding, Henry was made Honorary Colonel of the 5th (Isle of Wight, Princess Beatrice's) Volunteer Battalion, the Hampshire Regiment, In early 1886, it was announced in The Times that he would be made a captain in the 1st Life Guards, but the Secretary of State for War (Henry Campbell-Bannerman) denied knowledge of this in the House of Commons and the appointment did not take place.

Henry and Beatrice had four children. By royal warrant of 13 December 1886, the Queen granted their children the style Highness. This style took immediate effect in the United Kingdom and elsewhere except within the German Empire, where, as Princes and Princesses of Battenberg, they were only entitled to the style Serene Highness.

== Later life and death ==
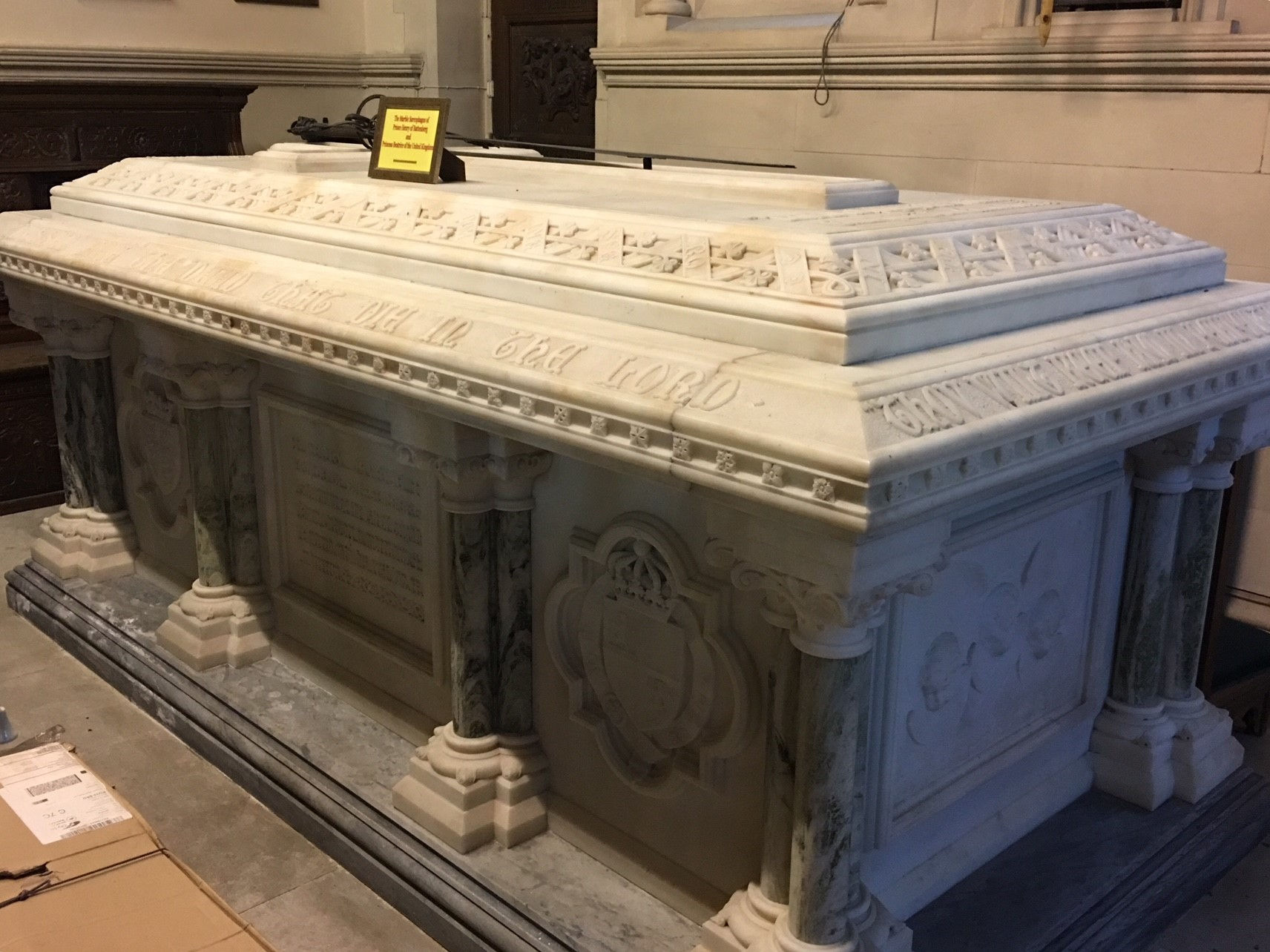
Tomb of Prince Henry and Princess Beatrice in St Mildred's Church, Whippingham, Isle of Wight

In 1889, Henry was made Governor of Carisbrooke Castle and Captain-General and Governor of the Isle of Wight. He was made Lieutenant-Colonel in the Army on 21 June 1887, Colonel on 22 February 1893 and appointed to the Privy Council on 20 November 1894.

In November 1895, Henry persuaded Queen Victoria to allow him to go to West Africa to fight in the Ashanti War. He served as the military secretary to the commander-in-chief of British forces, Colonel Sir Francis Scott. He contracted malaria when the expedition reached Prahsu, about 30 miles (50 km) from Kumasi, and subsequently died aboard the cruiser HMS Blonde stationed off the coast of Sierra Leone.

His body was repatriated by the cruiser HMS Blenheim from the Canary Islands and his funeral service took place on 5 February 1896, at the same St. Mildred's Church, Whippingham, on the Isle of Wight, where he had been married. Interment followed in what became known as the Battenberg Chapel. The remains of his wife, Beatrice, were placed there in August 1945, and those of his eldest son, the Marquess of Carisbrooke, in July 1961.

Beatrice's sister Louise told Sir James Reid of "Prince Henry's attempted relations with her, which she had declined."

In 1896, Victoria erected a memorial to Henry in the form of a Celtic cross, near Connachat Cottage in the grounds of Balmoral Castle. It is inscribed "Brief Life! In sport and war so keen, morned by these winds in heath and fir as where the falling breakers stir the pains that crowned thy closing scene".

== Titles, styles, honours and arms ==
=== Titles and styles ===
- 5 October 1858 – 21 December 1858: His Illustrious Highness Count Henry of Battenberg
- 21 December 1858 – 20 January 1896: His Serene Highness Prince Henry of Battenberg
- In the UK: 22 July 1885 – 20 January 1896: His Royal Highness Prince Henry of Battenberg

=== Honours ===
- Hesse and by Rhine:
  - Grand Cross of the Merit Order of Philip the Magnanimous, with Swords, 18 May 1875
  - Grand Cross of the Ludwig Order, 23 April 1885
- United Kingdom:
  - KG: Knight of the Garter, 23 July 1885
  - Queen Victoria Golden Jubilee Medal, 1887
  - PC: Privy Counsellor, 20 November 1894
- Bulgaria:
  - Grand Cross of St. Alexander
  - Commemorative Medal for the Liberation of Bulgaria
- (Saxe-Coburg and Gotha) (Duchy of Saxe-Altenburg) (Saxe-Meiningen) Ernestine duchies: Grand Cross of the Saxe-Ernestine House Order
- Mecklenburg: Grand Cross of the Wendish Crown, with Golden Crown
- Montenegro: Grand Cross of the Order of Prince Danilo I
- Ottoman Empire: Order of Osmanieh, 1st Class
- Portugal: Grand Cross of the Tower and Sword
- Prussia: Grand Cross of the Red Eagle
- Romania: Grand Cross of the Star of Romania
- Serbia: Grand Cross of the Cross of Takovo

=== Arms ===
Coat of arms of Prince Henry of Battenberg

== Issue ==
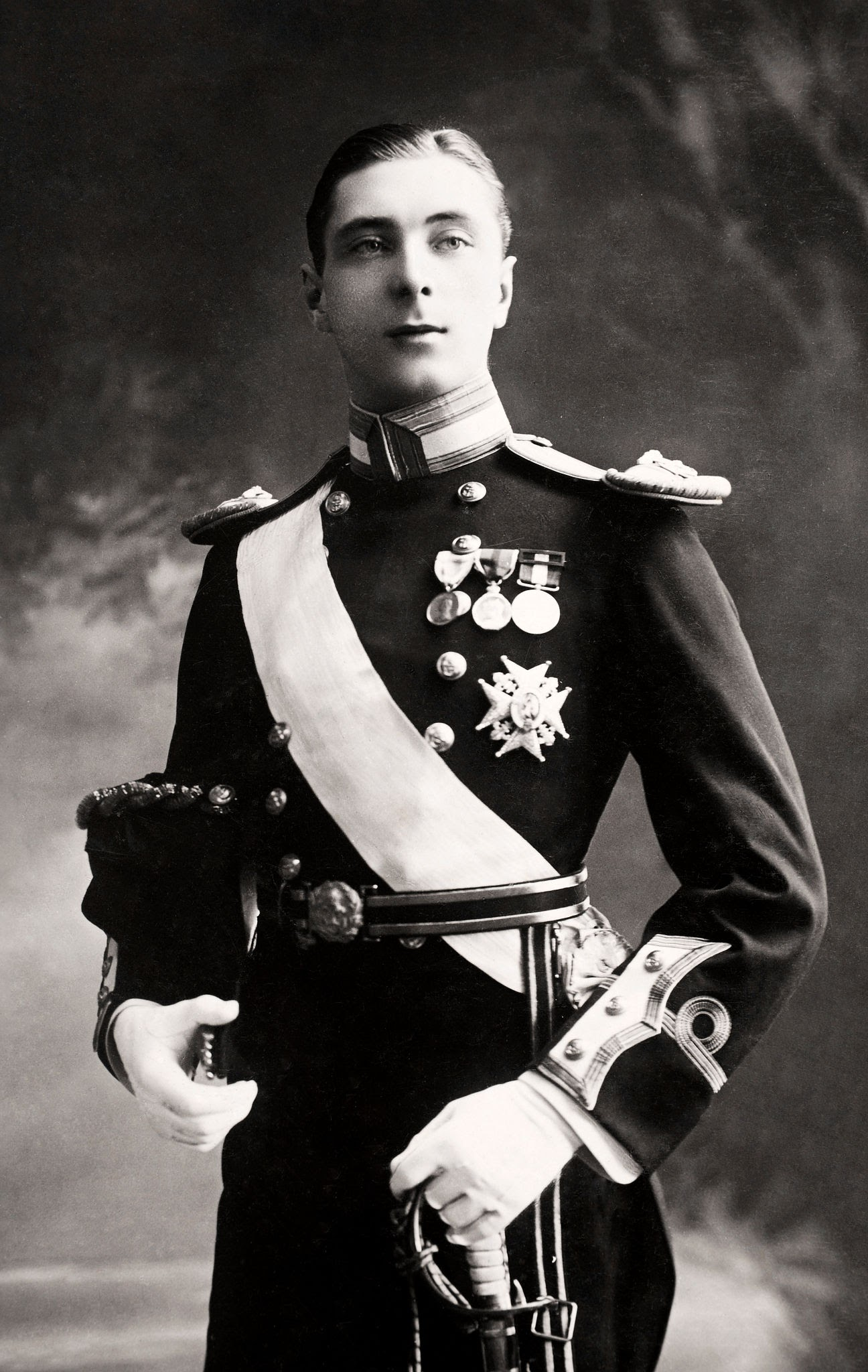
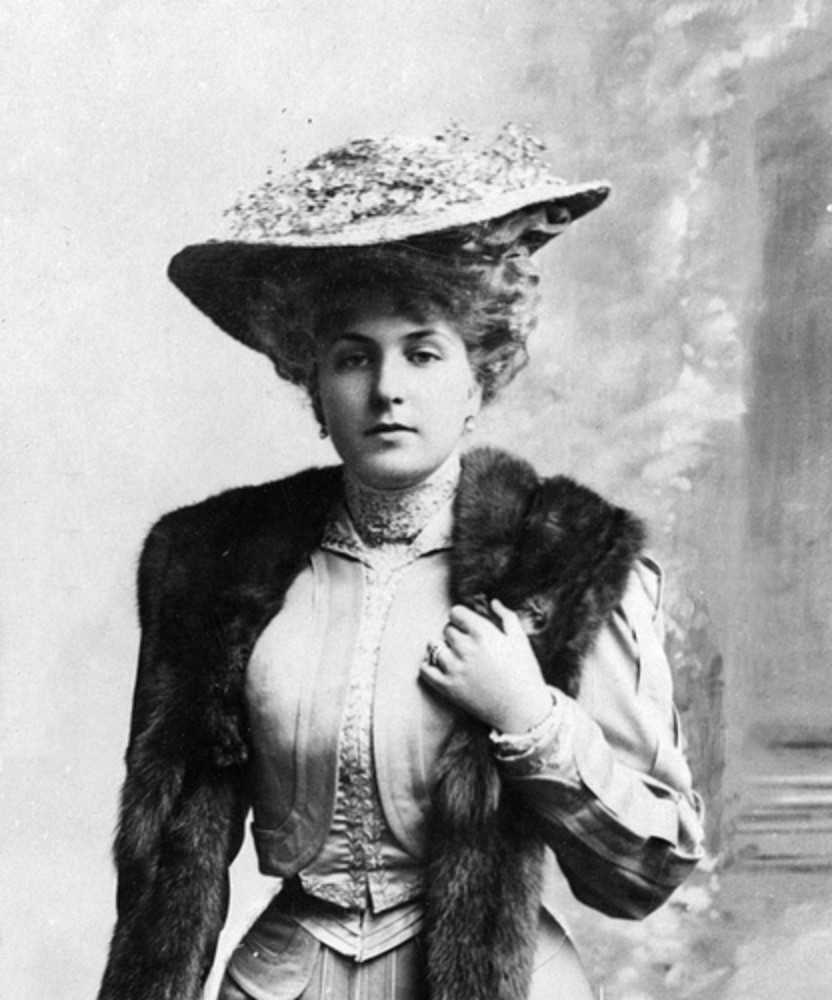
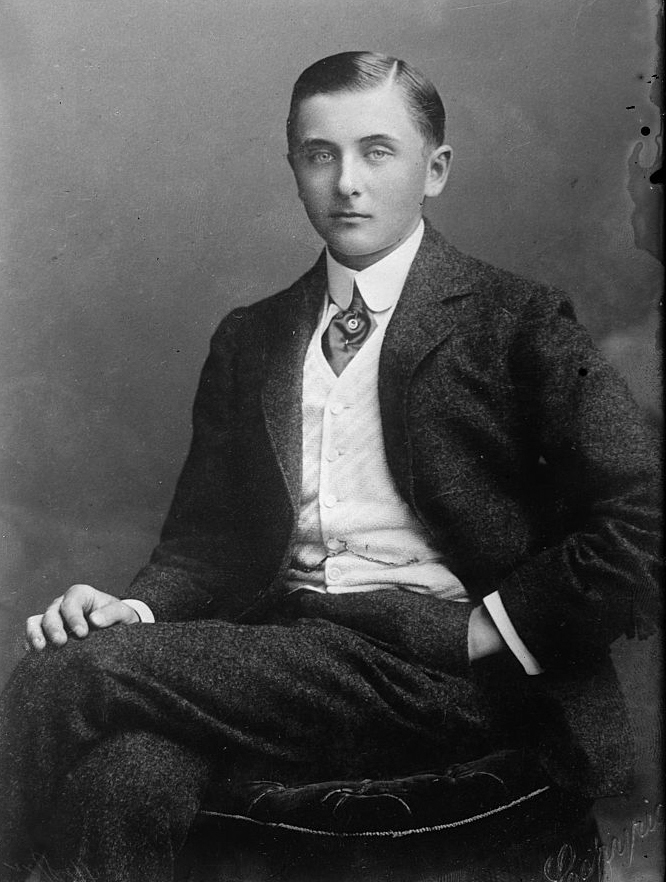
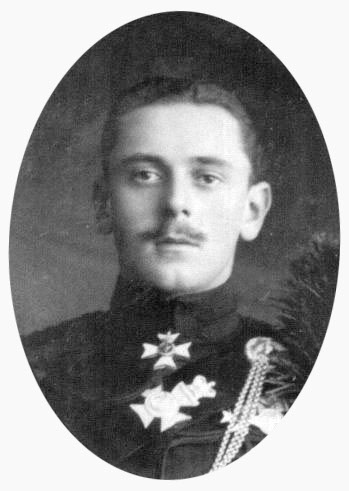
Image	Name	Birth	Death	Notes
	Prince Alexander of Battenberg later Alexander Mountbatten, 1st Marquess of Carisbrooke	23 November 1886	23 February 1960	Married, 1917 Irene Denison (4 July 1890 – 16 July 1956); had issue.
	Princess Victoria Eugenie of Battenberg	24 October 1887	15 April 1969	Married, 1906, Alfonso XIII of Spain (17 May 1886 – 28 February 1941); had issue.
	Prince Leopold of Battenberg later Lord Leopold Mountbatten	21 May 1889	23 April 1922	Suffered from haemophilia; died unmarried and without issue during a knee operation.
	Prince Maurice of Battenberg	3 October 1891	27 October 1914	Killed in action during World War I.

Prince Henry of Battenberg House of Battenberg Cadet branch of the House of Hesse-Darmstadt Born: 5 October 1858 Died: 20 January 1896
Honorary titles
Preceded by The Viscount Eversley	Governor of the Isle of Wight; 1889–1896	Succeeded by Princess Beatrice
