= Lord Leopold Mountbatten =

British noble and army officer

Major Lord Leopold Mountbatten GCVO
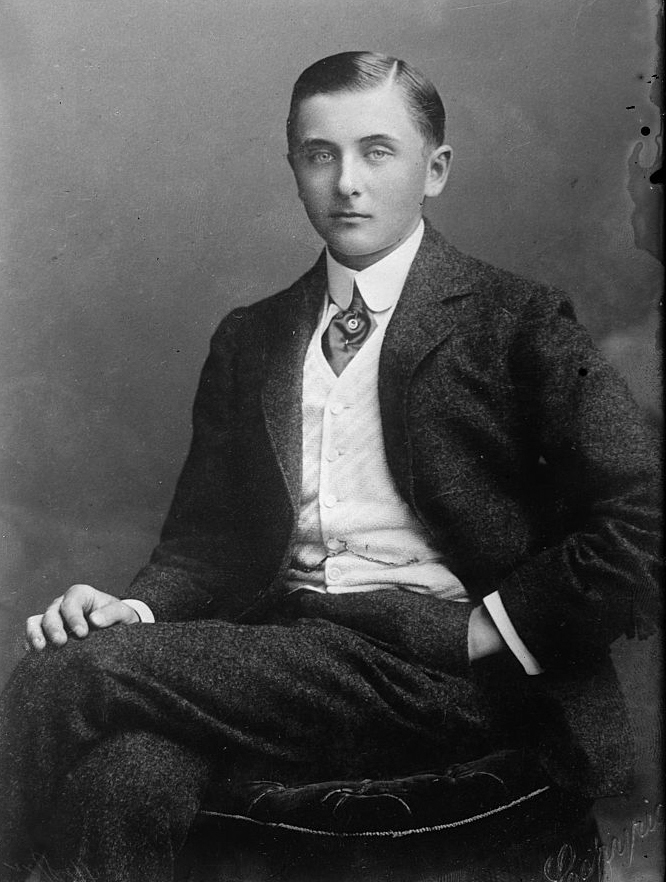
- Full name: Leopold Arthur Louis Mountbatten
- Born: Prince Leopold of Battenberg; 21 May 1889; Windsor Castle, United Kingdom
- Died: 23 April 1922 (aged 32); Kensington Palace, United Kingdom
- Buried: 1 May 1922; Royal Vault, St George's Chapel, Windsor Castle; 23 October 1928; Royal Burial Ground, Frogmore
- Noble family: Battenberg (until 1917); Mountbatten (from 1917)
- Father: Prince Henry of Battenberg
- Mother: Princess Beatrice of the United Kingdom
- Military career
- Allegiance: United Kingdom
- Branch: British Army
- Service years: 1909–1920
- Units: Isle of Wight Rifles; King's Royal Rifle Corps
- Conflicts: First World War; Western Front; Ypres Salient

Lord Leopold Arthur Louis Mountbatten (21 May 1889 – 23 April 1922) was a British Army officer and a descendant of the Hessian princely Battenberg family and the British royal family. A grandson of Queen Victoria, he was known as Prince Leopold of Battenberg from his birth until 1917, when the British royal family relinquished their German titles during World War I, and the Battenberg family changed their name to Mountbatten.

== Early life ==
Leopold was born on 21 May 1889. His father was Prince Henry of Battenberg, the son of Prince Alexander of Hesse and by Rhine and Julia, Princess of Battenberg. His mother was Princess Beatrice of the United Kingdom, the fifth daughter and the youngest child of Queen Victoria and Prince Albert.

As he was the product of a morganatic marriage, Prince Henry of Battenberg took his style of Prince of Battenberg from his mother, Julia von Hauke, who was created Princess of Battenberg in her own right.

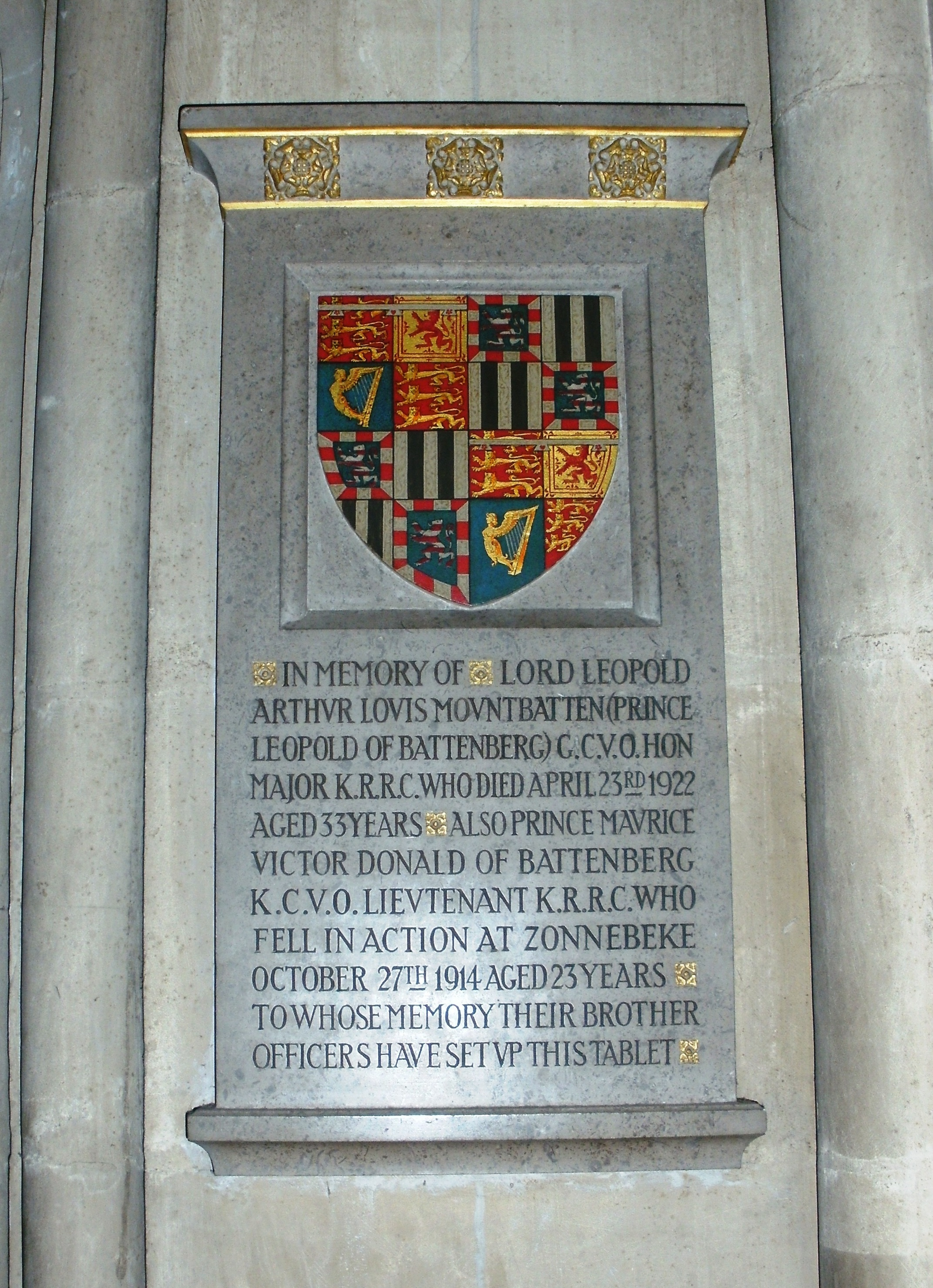
Winchester Cathedral, memorial to Leopold and his brother Maurice

As such, Leopold was styled as His Serene Highness Prince Leopold of Battenberg from birth. In the United Kingdom, he was styled His Highness Prince Leopold of Battenberg under a royal warrant passed by Queen Victoria in 1886. He was baptised at St George's Chapel, Windsor Castle on 29 June 1889. His godparents were Leopold II of Belgium (his first cousin twice removed, represented by the Prince of Wales, his maternal uncle), the Duke of Connaught and Strathearn (his maternal uncle, represented by Prince Albert of Schleswig-Holstein, his first cousin), Prince Louis of Battenberg (his paternal uncle, represented by the Marquess of Lorne, his maternal uncle), the Marchioness of Lorne (his maternal aunt), the Duchess of Albany (his maternal aunt) and Princess Marie of Erbach-Schönberg (his paternal aunt). His father died of malaria in 1896.

Leopold was a haemophiliac, a condition he inherited through his mother. His namesake maternal uncle, Prince Leopold, Duke of Albany, had died from the same condition.

== Military career ==
Leopold was commissioned a lieutenant (supernumerary) on 16 October 1909 in the 8th Battalion of the Isle of Wight Rifles, a Territorial Force unit. On 19 October 1912, he received a regular army commission in The King's Royal Rifle Corps. During service in the First World War, he was promoted to temporary lieutenant on 15 November 1914, to lieutenant on 30 April 1915 and finally to captain on 14 September 1916.

On 7 April 1918, he was placed on the half-pay list "on account of ill-health contracted on active service." From 23 July of that year until the following 6 January, he served as an extra aide-de-camp on the staff of the War Office. He resigned his commission on 14 April 1920; at the special request of his cousin, George V, he was granted the honorary rank of major.

== Relinquishment of titles ==
During the First World War, anti-German feeling in the United Kingdom led Leopold's first cousin, George V to change the name of the royal house from the Germanic House of Saxe-Coburg and Gotha to the more English-sounding House of Windsor. The King also renounced all his Germanic titles for himself and all members of the British royal family who were British citizens.

In response to this, Leopold renounced his title of Prince, the style His Highness and the designation 'of Battenberg' through a royal warrant from the King dated 14 July 1917, and became Sir Leopold Mountbatten by virtue of his being a Knight Grand Cross of the Royal Victorian Order. Under a further warrant of 11 September 1917 he was granted the style and precedence of the younger son of a marquess, and became Lord Leopold Mountbatten.

== Death ==
Lord Leopold died on 23 April 1922 (aged 32), during a hip operation. After being initially interred in the Royal Vault at St George's Chapel, Windsor Castle, he was buried in the Royal Burial Ground, Frogmore. A memorial tablet to him and his brother Maurice is in Winchester Cathedral. His will was sealed in London after his death in 1922. His estate was valued at £4,049 (or £160,600 in 2022 when adjusted for inflation).

== Honours ==
- KCVO: Knight Commander of the Royal Victorian Order, 19 June 1911
- GCVO: Knight Grand Cross of the Royal Victorian Order, 1 January 1915

Foreign

- Spain: Knight Grand Cross of the Order of Charles III, 27 May 1906

== Ancestry ==
Ancestors of Lord Leopold Mountbatten

8. Louis II, Grand Duke of Hesse and by Rhine
4. Prince Alexander of Hesse and by Rhine
9. Princess Wilhelmine of Baden
2. Prince Henry of Battenberg
10. Count John Maurice Hauke
5. Countess Julia Hauke
11. Sophie Lafontaine
1. Lord Leopold Mountbatten
12. Ernest I, Duke of Saxe-Coburg and Gotha
6. Prince Albert of Saxe-Coburg and Gotha
13. Princess Louise of Saxe-Gotha-Altenburg
3. Princess Beatrice of the United Kingdom
14. Prince Edward, Duke of Kent and Strathearn
7. Victoria of the United Kingdom
15. Princess Victoria of Saxe-Coburg-Saalfeld
