= Royal Memorial Church of St George =

The Royal Memorial Church of St George, Cannes, was erected in the 19th century in honour of The Duke of Albany, the son of Queen Victoria, who died in Cannes in 1884. His brother, the Prince of Wales commissioned the church to be built in his honour.

== History ==
It was founded in 1886 and consecrated in the presence of the Prince of Wales a year later. Queen Victoria visited in 1887, 1891, and 1898 for the confirmation of Princess Alice. In 1970 it was sold to the city of Cannes, becoming a Roman Catholic church in 1974.

== Gothic Revival style ==
In style it is early English Gothic, the work of Sir Arthur Blomfield. The statue of St George above the entrance door is by F. W. Pomeroy.

"The very beautiful memorial chapel to the Duke of Albany at Cannes nears completion. It is to be opened this month. Throughout the work the Prince of Wales has taken the keenest interest, consulting with Sir Arthur Blomfield, and questioning the minutest details. In his helpers Sir Arthur has been very fortunate. Messrs. Heaton, Butler and Bayne are responsible for some of the windows, and Messrs. Powell for at least one other, while the decorations under Sir Arthur's guidance have been carried along by Mr. Charles Floyce. Mr. Floyce is a student of the old masters. Those who recall him years ago as a student at the National Gallery engaged persistently in making faithful copies of the old Italian masters — Crivelli, Fra Angelico, and Luini, whom he got to understand as a book, will be glad to know that his training has not been lost."
