= Rupert Cambridge, Viscount Trematon =

Great-grandson of Queen Victoria

Rupert Cambridge
- Viscount Trematon
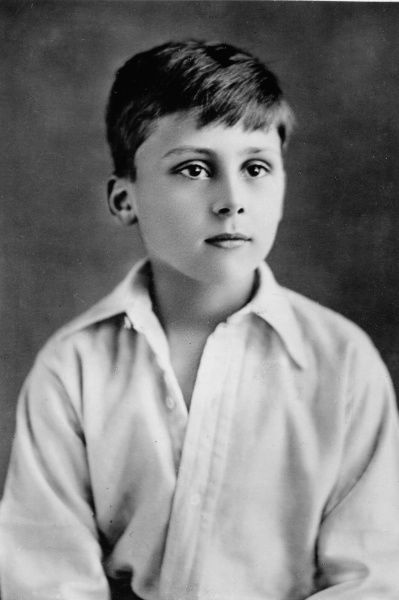
- Rupert in the 1910s
- Born: Prince Rupert of Teck; 24 April 1907; Claremont, Esher, Surrey, England
- Died: 15 April 1928 (aged 20); Belleville-sur-Saône, France
- Buried: 20 April 1928; Royal Vault, St George's Chapel, Windsor Castle; 23 October 1928; Royal Burial Ground, Frogmore
- Father: Alexander Cambridge, 1st Earl of Athlone
- Mother: Princess Alice of Albany

Rupert Alexander George Cambridge, Viscount Trematon (24 April 1907 – 15 April 1928) was an English-born great-grandson of Queen Victoria. Originally Prince Rupert of Teck, he and his family relinquished their German titles in 1917. As heir apparent to the Earldom of Athlone, he was known as Lord Trematon, but he died before he could inherit the title.

== Family ==
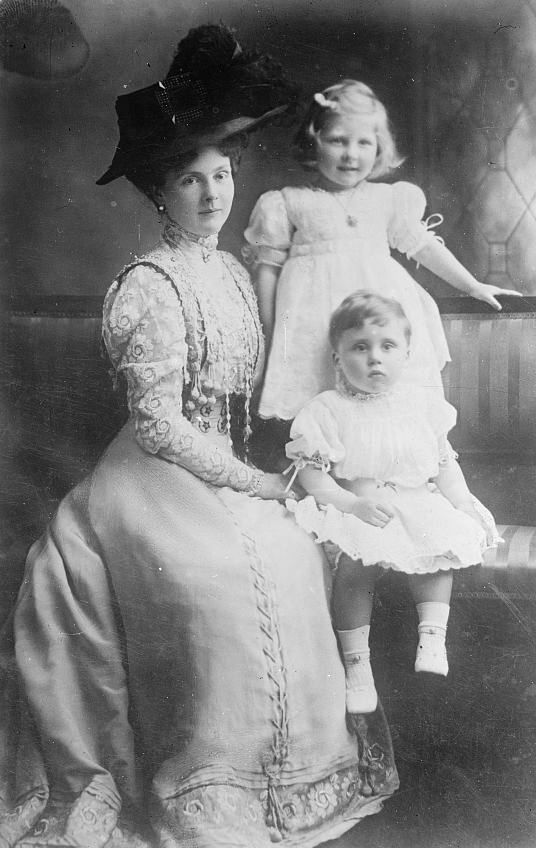
Prince Rupert with his mother and sister, c. 1909

Rupert was born on 24 April 1907 at Claremont House, England. His parents were Prince Alexander of Teck and the former Princess Alice of Albany, great-grandson and granddaughter of George III and Queen Victoria respectively. Prince Rupert was a haemophiliac, a condition he shared with many descendants of Queen Victoria, including his maternal grandfather, Prince Leopold, Duke of Albany, who died because of it. Rupert attended Ludgrove School and Eton as a boy. At the time of his death, he was an undergraduate at Trinity College, Cambridge.

== Viscount Trematon ==
During the First World War, anti-German feeling in the United Kingdom led Rupert's uncle King George V to renounce all Germanic titles for himself and his family. In response to this, Prince Alexander, Rupert's father, on 14 July 1917 renounced his title of a prince of Teck in the Kingdom of Württemberg and the style His Serene Highness. Alexander, along with his brother, Prince Adolphus of Teck, adopted the name Cambridge, after their maternal grandfather, Prince Adolphus, Duke of Cambridge. On 7 November, the King created his brother-in-law Earl of Athlone and Viscount Trematon. Alexander was now styled The Right Honourable The Earl of Athlone. Rupert adopted the courtesy title of Viscount Trematon. His mother retained her title of Princess of Great Britain and Ireland with the style Her Royal Highness and became known as Princess Alice, Countess of Athlone.

== Death ==
Viscount Trematon died on 15 April 1928 from an intracerebral haemorrhage as a result of a car crash in France. On 1 April 1928, Lord Trematon was driving with two friends on the road from Paris to Lyon. While overtaking another vehicle, Trematon's car hit a tree and overturned. One of his friends died from injuries and Trematon was taken to a nearby hospital at Belleville-sur-Saône with a slight fracture of the skull. He never recovered consciousness and died in hospital two weeks later in the early hours of 15 April. His funeral took place in St George's Chapel, Windsor Castle, and was attended by King George V and Queen Mary. He was interred in the Royal Vault at St George's Chapel on 20 April before being buried in the Royal Burial Ground, Frogmore, on 23 October 1928. His death without issue meant that the title of Earl of Athlone became extinct in 1957 when his father died without further issue, his infant brother Maurice having died in 1910.
