= Princess Alice, Countess of Athlone =

British princess (1883–1981)

Princess Alice
- Princess Alexander of Teck; Countess of Athlone
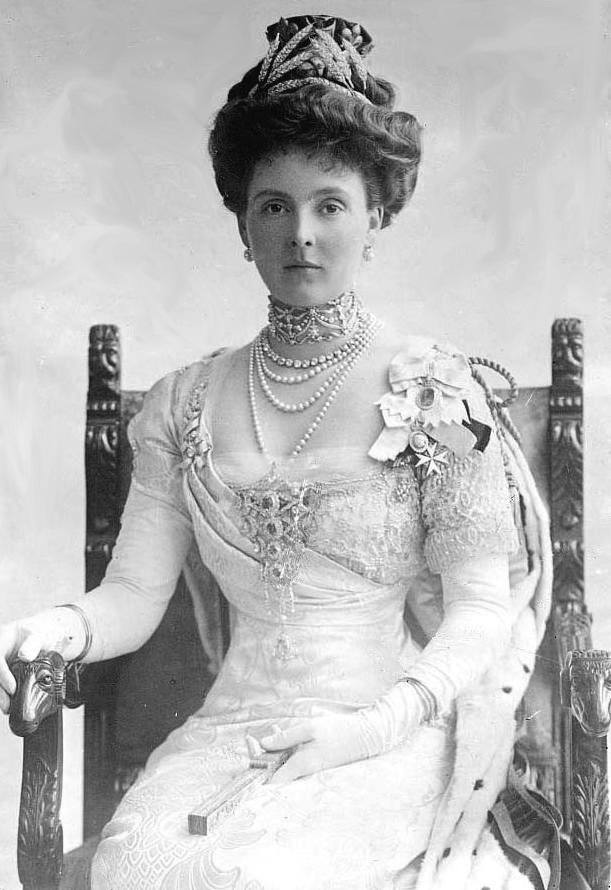
- Princess Alice in 1911
- Born: Princess Alice of Albany; 25 February 1883; Windsor Castle, Berkshire, England
- Died: 3 January 1981 (aged 97); Kensington Palace, London, England
- Burial: 8 January 1981; Royal Burial Ground, Frogmore
- Spouse: Alexander Cambridge, 1st Earl of Athlone (m. 1904; died 1957)
- Issue: Lady May Abel Smith; Rupert Cambridge, Viscount Trematon; Prince Maurice of Teck
Names
- Alice Mary Victoria Augusta Pauline
- House: Saxe-Coburg and Gotha (until 1917); Windsor (from 1917)
- Father: Prince Leopold, Duke of Albany
- Mother: Princess Helen of Waldeck and Pyrmont

Viceregal consort of Canada
- In role 21 June 1940 – 12 April 1946

Princess Alice, Countess of Athlone (Alice Mary Victoria Augusta Pauline; 25 February 1883 – 3 January 1981), was a member of the British royal family. She was the longest-lived princess of the blood royal, and one of the longest-lived British royals. Princess Alice was the last surviving grandchild of Queen Victoria, the sister-in-law of Queen Mary, and the first cousin of Queen Mary's husband, King George V, and was the sister of Charles Edward the last Duke of Saxe-Coburg and Gotha. The Princess served as Viceregal Consort of both the Union of South Africa and of Canada.

== Early life ==
Alice was born on 25 February 1883 at Windsor Castle, the only daughter of Prince Leopold, Duke of Albany (the youngest of the four sons of Queen Victoria and Albert, Prince Consort) and his wife Princess Helen of Waldeck and Pyrmont. Her younger brother and only sibling, Prince Charles Edward (later Duke of Saxe-Coburg and Gotha), was born on 19 July 1884.

She was baptised in the Private Chapel at Windsor Castle on 26 March, and named Alice after her late paternal aunt Princess Alice, Grand Duchess of Hesse. Her godparents were: Queen Victoria (her paternal grandmother); the German Empress, for whom Alice's paternal aunt Princess Beatrice stood proxy; the King of the Netherlands (her maternal uncle), for whom the Dutch Ambassador Count Charles van Bylandt stood proxy; the Grand Duke of Hesse and by Rhine (her paternal uncle), represented by his brother-in-law Alfred, Duke of Edinburgh; the Princess of Waldeck and Pyrmont (her maternal grandmother); the Prince of Wales (her paternal uncle); the Princess Royal (the German Crown Princess – her paternal aunt) represented by her sister-in-law the Princess of Wales; Prince Wilhelm of Württemberg (her maternal uncle), represented by his cousin the Duke of Teck; the Hereditary Princess of Bentheim and Steinfurt (her maternal aunt), for whom her paternal aunt Princess Christian stood proxy; and the Duchess of Cambridge (her grandmother's aunt), represented by her daughter the Duchess of Teck. She was confirmed at the Royal Memorial Church of St George, Cannes, in 1898 with Queen Victoria present.

When she was four years old, a burglar broke into Clarence House through Alice's bedroom window on the first floor, having used a ladder from a nearby farmhouse. He was followed by two accomplices, but a scream from Alice's nanny alerted everyone and made them flee. Princess Alice's mother tried to calm her by telling her it had been Father Christmas.

Alice was one of the carriers of the gene for haemophilia which originated with Queen Victoria. Alice inherited the gene from her father, who died from the disease when she was one year old.

== Marriage and family ==
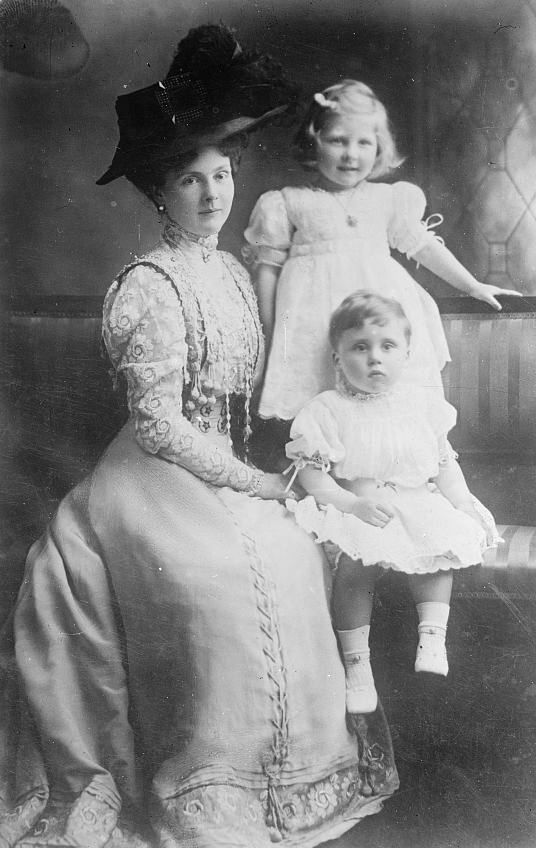
Princess Alice, Countess of Athlone, with her children May and Rupert, c. 1909

On 10 February 1904, at St George's Chapel, Windsor, Alice married her second cousin once removed Prince Alexander of Teck, the brother-in-law of the Prince of Wales (later George V). Alice was attended by five bridesmaids, all cousins: Princesses Margaret and Patricia of Connaught, Princess Helena of Waldeck and Pyrmont, Princess Mary of Wales and Princess Mary of Teck (the latter two also the groom's nieces). Alice and her husband were both descended from King George III. They had three children:

- Princess May of Teck (23 January 1906 – 29 May 1994), later Lady May Cambridge; married Sir Henry Abel Smith in 1931, had issue.
- Prince Rupert of Teck (24 April 1907 – 15 April 1928), later Viscount Trematon; died in a car accident.
- Prince Maurice Francis George of Teck (29 March 1910 – 14 September 1910); died at five months old.

King George V granted her husband the Earldom of Athlone in 1917, during the First World War, following the royal family's relinquishing of German titles. Following the Earl's retirement from military service after the war, the couple moved to Clock House within Kensington Palace, the grace and favour apartment that had previously been occupied by Alice's mother; in 1923 they also acquired a country house, Brantridge Park in West Sussex.

Alice was godmother to Queen Beatrix of the Netherlands, who is the granddaughter of her first cousin on her mother's side, Queen Wilhelmina of the Netherlands.

== South Africa, Canada and Second World War ==
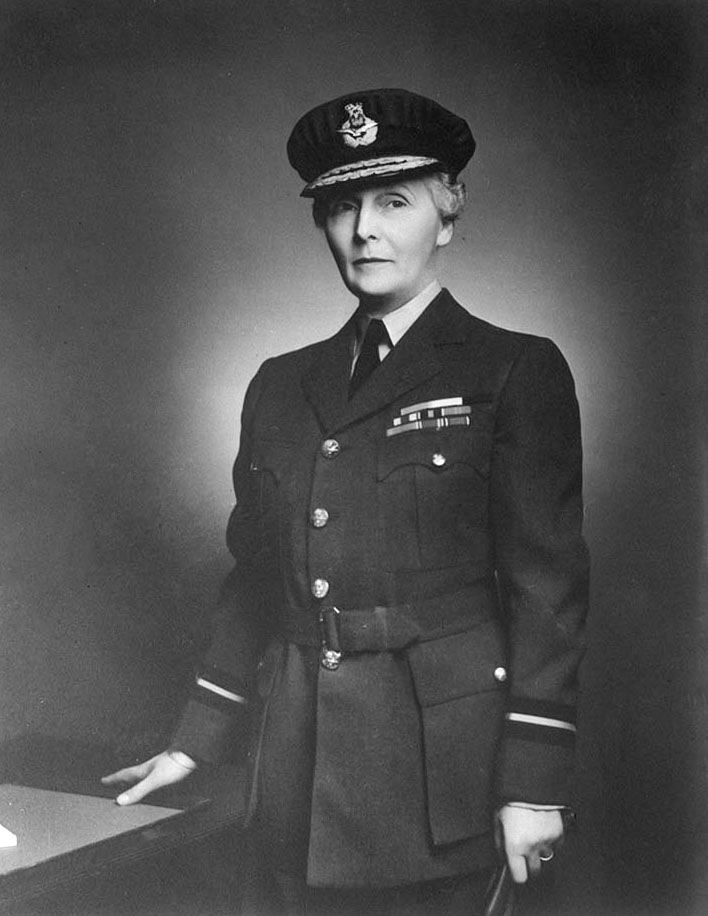
Princess Alice in Royal Canadian Air Force uniform, 1942

The Earl was appointed Governor-General of the Union of South Africa, and served from 1924 to 1931. Alice accompanied him and was the Vicereine during that period. Lord Athlone and Alice had a coastal beach house constructed at Muizenberg, which still stands today and is one of South Africa's national monuments. The Cape Town suburb of Athlone was named in honour of the Governor-General; apart from the beach house and the preserved Class GL Garratt steam locomotive Princess Alice in the Outeniqua Transport Museum, it is the only physical reminder of the Athlones' residence at the Cape.

On the sudden death of the popular Lord Tweedsmuir in 1940, Canada found itself without a Governor General in time of war. Despite the longstanding intention of Canadian governments to appoint Canadian nationals as governors general—Australia had already appointed an Australian national, Sir Isaac Isaacs, as its governor general in 1931—the royal family had garnered vast public support during the royal tour of 1939. As Queen Mary's brother and a former governor general of another Dominion, Lord Athlone seemed a satisfactory candidate, and the Canadian prime minister (W. L. Mackenzie King) advised the King to appoint him.

Alice accompanied her husband to Canada where he served as Governor General from 1940 to 1946, residing primarily at Rideau Hall in Ottawa. Their three grandchildren, Anne, Richard, and Elizabeth, lived with them in Canada for the duration of the war.

Upon taking up his post, The Earl immediately made himself active in the support of the war effort, travelling across the country and focusing much of his attention on the troops, either those training at military facilities or those injured and in hospital. Viewing his position as governor general as a link between Canadians and their monarch, Athlone also communicated in speeches that the King stood with them in their fight against Adolf Hitler and the Nazi regime.

As vicereine of Canada, Alice also supported the war effort by serving as Honorary Commandant of the Women's Royal Canadian Naval Service, Honorary Air Commandant of the Royal Canadian Air Force Women's Division and president of the nursing division of the St John Ambulance Brigade.

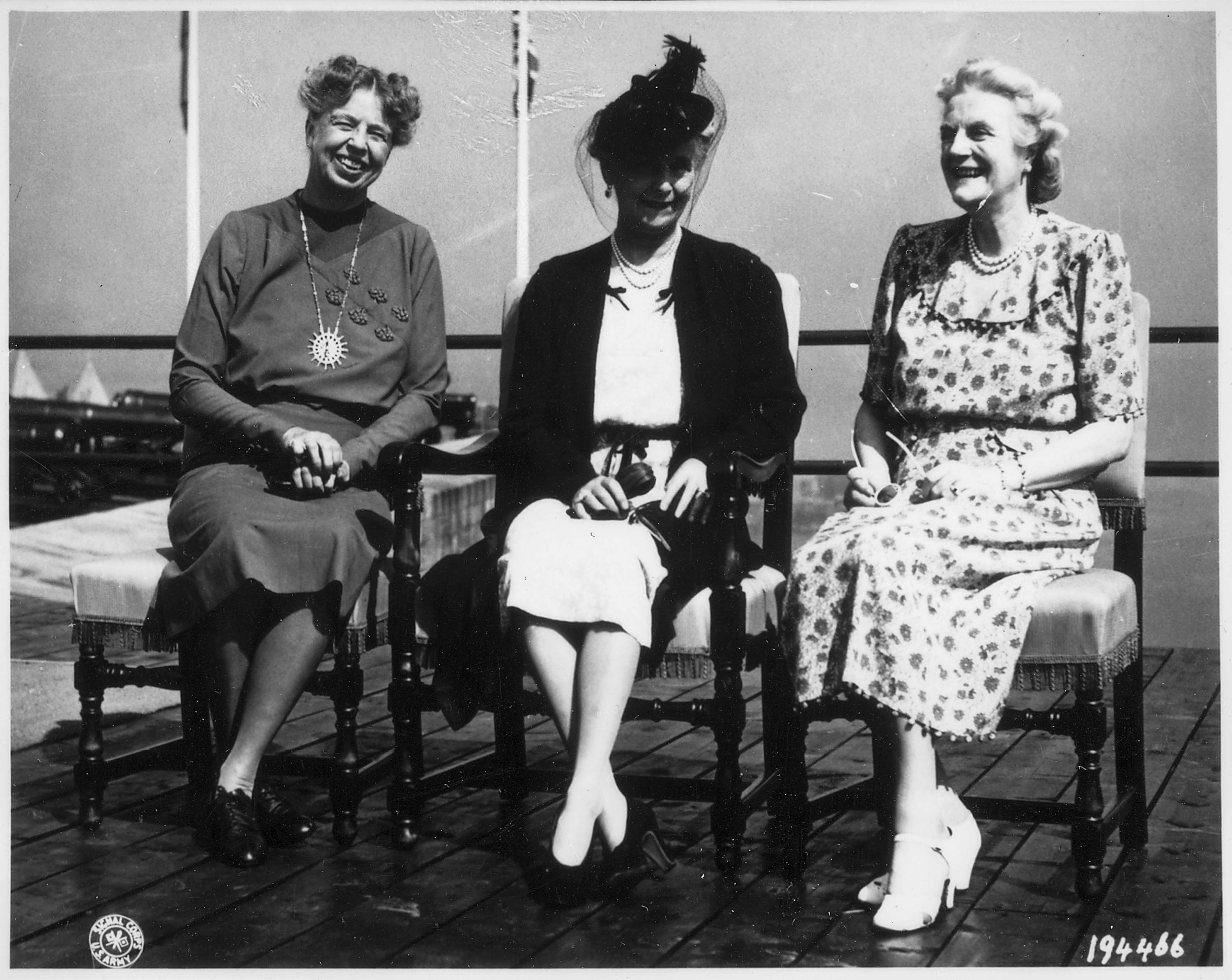
Eleanor Roosevelt, Princess Alice, and Clementine Churchill at the Second Quebec Conference during the Second World War

In 1944, the Princess Alice Barracks Cabin at Britannia Bay provided a summer retreat for Royal Canadian Air Force Women's Division personnel based in Ottawa. The cabin was located near the Britannia Boating Club's facilities for tennis, dancing and boating. Rented from the King's Daughter's Guild of Ottawa, the cabin featured 60 beds, a separate cookhouse and dining pavilion. The cabin had served previously as a Fresh Air Cottage for mothers and undernourished children.

The war was brought close to home for the Athlones also because many of those belonging to displaced European royal families sought refuge in Canada, and resided at or near the royal and viceroyal residence, Rideau Hall. Among the royal guests were Crown Prince Olav and Crown Princess Märtha of Norway; Grand Duchess Charlotte and Prince Felix of Luxembourg; King Peter of Yugoslavia; King George of Greece; Empress Zita of Bourbon-Parma (Austria) and her daughters; as well as Queen Wilhelmina and her daughter, Princess Juliana. Further, in December 1941, British prime minister Winston Churchill arrived at Rideau Hall, where he presided over British Cabinet meetings via telephone from his bed.

The viceregal couple also played host at Quebec City to prime minister Mackenzie King, as well as Churchill and United States president Franklin D. Roosevelt, who all gathered to take part in what would become known as the Quebec Conferences, with the first taking place between 17 and 24 August 1943 at the viceregal residence in La Citadelle, and the second occurring from 12 to 16 September 1944 at the Château Frontenac. Photos of the Earl with Roosevelt, Churchill and Mackenzie King on the ramparts of the Citadel during the Quebec Conference were widely published at the time.

It was at these meetings that the four men discussed the Allied strategies that would eventually lead to victory over Nazi Germany and Japan. When Germany fell on 8 May 1945 and Japan on 15 August of the same year, Athlone led the national celebrations held on Parliament Hill and elsewhere. He thereafter spoke in speeches about Canada's future being marked not by war but by a strong role in reconstruction and reconciliation.

During their time in Canada, the Athlones also supported various charitable and social events, and mounted a number of tobogganing parties and skating lessons on the grounds of Rideau Hall, as well as skiing in Gatineau Park. Before the couple departed from Canada at the end of Athlone's time as the King's representative, he left as a legacy the Athlone-Vanier Engineering Fellowship, awarded by the Engineering Institute of Canada.

== Public life ==
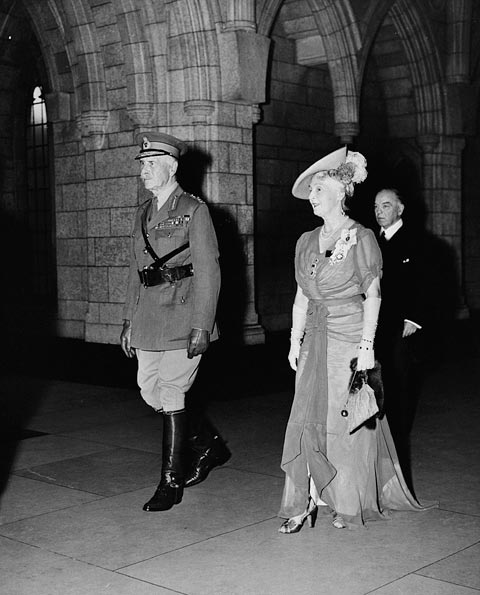
The Earl and Countess of Athlone, followed by Mackenzie King, at the opening of Parliament, 6 September 1945

In her lifetime, Alice carried out many engagements and took part in many of the activities the royal family were involved in. Apart from her normal duties as vicereine of South Africa and then Canada, she attended the coronations of four British monarchs: Edward VII, George V, George VI and Elizabeth II, as well as the investiture of the Dutch queen Juliana. She was also the Colonel-in-Chief of two British Army units and one Rhodesian Army unit. During the Second World War, she was Honorary Air Commandant of the Royal Canadian Air Force Women's Division. In 1950, she became the first Chancellor of the University of the West Indies (then the University College of the West Indies). As Chancellor, she visited the university every year, staying as a guest of Sir Kenneth Blackburne, Governor-General of Jamaica, and his wife.

From the 1930s to the 1960s, she was Chair of the Council (governing body) of Royal Holloway College, University of London. With her husband, daughter and son-in-law, Alice represented the King at the 1937 wedding of Juliana of the Netherlands to Prince Bernhard of Lippe-Biesterfeld.

Alice and her husband visited Bahrain and Saudi Arabia in the winter of 1938. She was the first member of the British royal family to visit Saudi Arabia and the only one to meet King Abdulaziz. Their nephew Lord Frederick Cambridge accompanied them on the visits. In Saudi Arabia Princess Alice visited Riyadh, Hofuf and Dammam, and met Noura bint Abdul Rahman, sister of the King and other members of the Saudi royal family.

In 1966, Princess Alice published her memoirs, For My Grandchildren.

== Later life and death ==
At the end of the Second World War, the American Military Government in Bavaria, under the command of General George S. Patton, arrested and imprisoned Alice's brother, Charles Edward, Duke of Saxe-Coburg and Gotha (who served as a member of the Reichstag from 1937 to 1945), because of his actions as a Nazi supporter during the war. Alice, learning of her brother's incarceration, came to Germany with her husband to plead with his American captors for his release. They would not yield, and in 1946 he was sentenced by a de-nazification court, heavily fined and almost bankrupted.

The Earl of Athlone died in 1957 at Kensington Palace in London. Alice lived there until her death, dying in her sleep on 3 January 1981, aged 97 years and 313 days. As of 2026 she remains the longest-living princess of the blood royal and is fourth on the list of longest-living members of the British royal family, just ahead of Queen Elizabeth II and surpassed only by the Queen's aunt, mother and husband, all of whom married into the royal family.

Her funeral in St George's Chapel at Windsor Castle was attended by all members of the royal family. She is buried alongside her husband and son in the Royal Burial Ground, Frogmore, directly behind the Royal Mausoleum containing the remains of her grandparents, Queen Victoria and Prince Albert. Her son, daughter and son-in-law are also buried close by.

At the time of her death she was great-aunt to the King of Sweden and the Queen of the United Kingdom. She lived through six reigns: those of Victoria (grandmother), Edward VII (uncle), George V (brother-in-law and cousin), Edward VIII as well as George VI (nephews) and Elizabeth II (great niece).

Her will was sealed in London after her death in 1981. Her estate was valued at £182,185 (or £567,100 in 2022 when adjusted for inflation).

== Honours ==
- Member, 1st Class, of the Royal Order of Victoria and Albert (VA)
- 1 January 1948: Dame Grand Cross of the Royal Victorian Order (GCVO)
- 11 May 1937: Dame Grand Cross of the Most Excellent Order of the British Empire (GBE)
- Dame Grand Cross of the Most Venerable Order of the Hospital of Saint John of Jerusalem (GCStJ)
- 12 May 1937: Recipient of the King George VI Coronation Medal
- 2 June 1953: Recipient of the Queen Elizabeth II Coronation Medal
- Royal Family Order of George V
- Royal Family Order of Elizabeth II

=== Honorary military appointment ===
Canada

- (Canada) Honorary Commandant, Women's Royal Canadian Naval Service
- (Canada) Honorary Air Commandant, Royal Canadian Air Force Women's Division

United Kingdom

- (United Kingdom) Commandant-in-Chief, First Aid Nursing Yeomanry

=== Arms ===
As a granddaughter of Queen Victoria in the male line, Princess Alice was entitled to use the Royal Arms with a 5-point label for difference, the central point bearing a cross gules, the others hearts gules.

Princess Alice's coat of arms

Alice's banner of arms, a five-point label, the first, second, fourth and fifth points charged with a red heart, the third point charged with the Cross of St. George

Alice's personal banner of arms in Scotland.

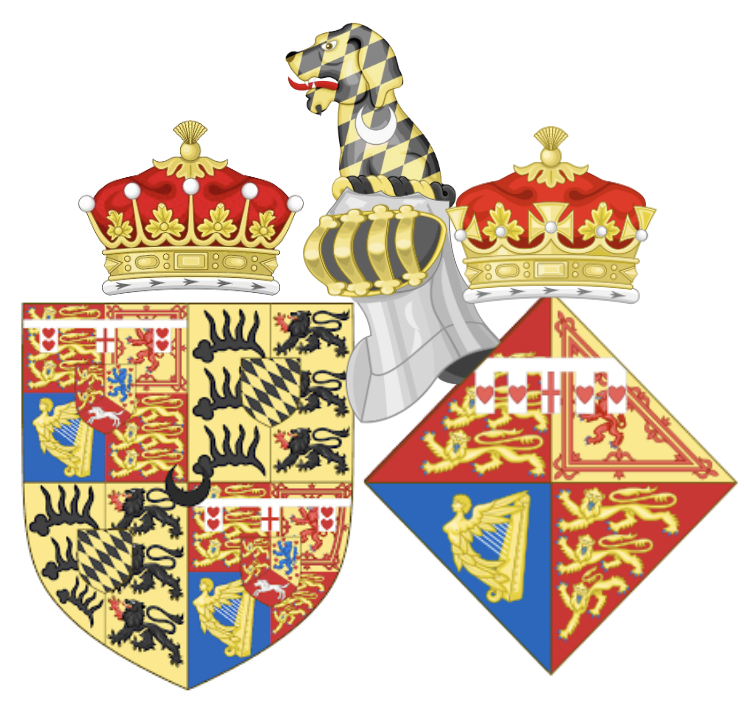

Arms of alliance of Lord Athone, and Princess Alice

== Ancestry ==
Ancestors of Princess Alice, Countess of Athlone

8. Ernest I, Duke of Saxe-Coburg and Gotha
4. Prince Albert of Saxe-Coburg and Gotha
9. Princess Louise of Saxe-Gotha-Altenburg
2. Prince Leopold, Duke of Albany
10. Prince Edward, Duke of Kent and Strathearn
5. Victoria of the United Kingdom
11. Princess Victoria of Saxe-Coburg-Saalfeld
1. Princess Alice, Countess of Athlone
12. George II, Prince of Waldeck and Pyrmont
6. George Victor, Prince of Waldeck and Pyrmont
13. Princess Emma of Anhalt-Bernburg-Schaumburg-Hoym
3. Princess Helen of Waldeck and Pyrmont
14. William, Duke of Nassau
7. Princess Helena of Nassau
15. Princess Pauline of Württemberg

Princess Alice, Countess of Athlone House of Saxe-Coburg and Gotha Cadet branch of the House of Wettin Born: 25 February 1883 Died: 3 January 1981
Honorary titles
Preceded by The Baroness Tweedsmuir	Viceregal consort of Canada; 1940–1946	Succeeded by The Countess Alexander of Tunis
Preceded by Princess Arthur of Connaught	Viceregal consort of South Africa; 1924–1930	Succeeded by The Countess of Clarendon
Academic offices
New title	Chancellor of the University of the West Indies; 1948–1971	Succeeded by Sir Hugh Wooding
