= Legitimacy of Queen Victoria =

Speculation over the parentage of Queen Victoria

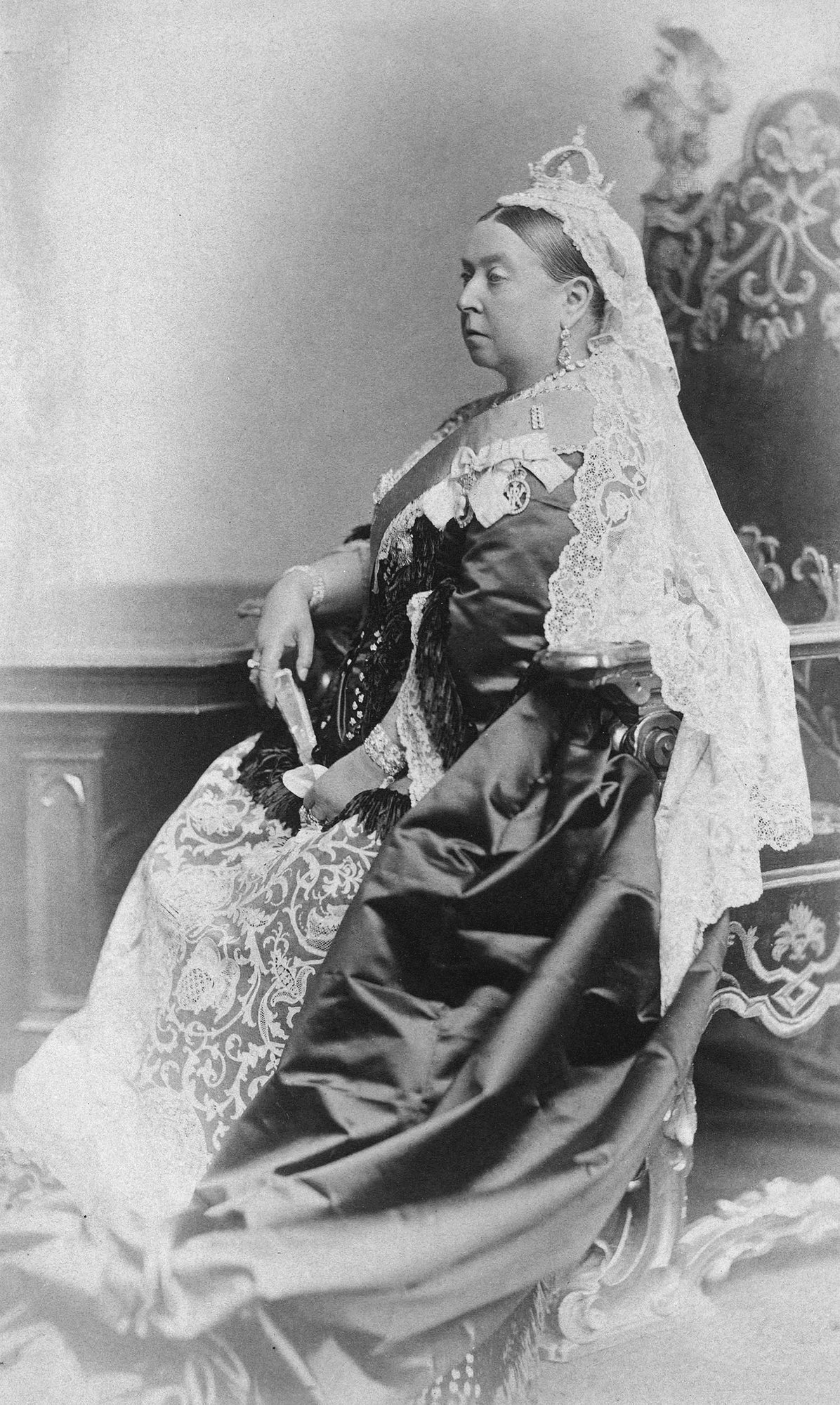
Queen Victoria

The parentage of Queen Victoria has been the subject of speculation. It has been suggested that her biological father was not Prince Edward, Duke of Kent and Strathearn. This suggestion has largely centred on the familial incidence of hereditary diseases and circumstantial evidence, and is not widely believed.

== Succession crisis ==
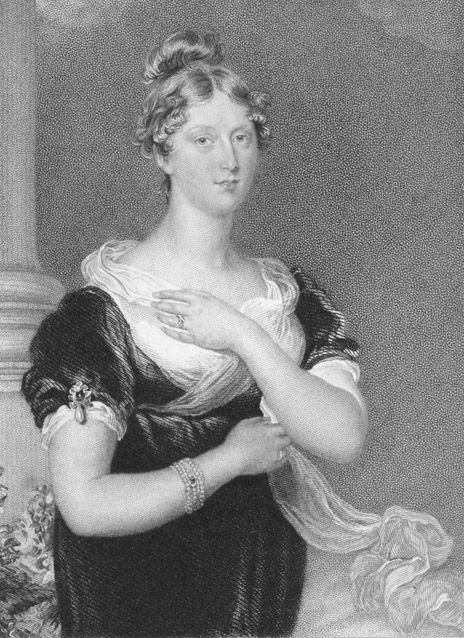
Princess Charlotte Augusta of Wales

Princess Charlotte of Wales was the only daughter of the Prince Regent (later King George IV). Her and her stillborn son's deaths in 1817 set off a race between the Prince Regent's brothers, the six surviving younger sons of King George III, to see who could father a legitimate heir. Some of the brothers had been previously involved in scandals. Prince Frederick, Duke of York and Albany, the second in line to the throne, was amicably separated from his wife, Princess Frederica Charlotte of Prussia, who was already past childbearing age. The sixth son, Prince Augustus Frederick, Duke of Sussex, had contracted two marriages in contravention of the Royal Marriages Act 1772 (as had the Prince Regent before his marriage to Charlotte's mother). Three brothers, the third, fourth and seventh in line to the throne, married in 1818: Prince William, Duke of Clarence; Prince Edward, Duke of Kent and Strathearn; and Prince Adolphus, Duke of Cambridge. The fifth son, Prince Ernest Augustus, Duke of Cumberland, was already married but had no living children at the time.

The Duke of Clarence married Princess Adelaide of Saxe-Meiningen. Though he had been able to father ten illegitimate children with Dorothea Jordan, an earlier mistress, none of his children by his wife survived childhood. The second daughter, Elizabeth, lived the longest, being born on 10 December 1820 and dying on 4 March 1821. The next son to produce an heir was the Duke of Cambridge, whose son George was born on 26 March 1819. He would be displaced two months later by the birth of a daughter to the Duke and Duchess of Kent. Their only child, Princess Victoria, was born on 24 May 1819, just three days before the son of the Duke of Cumberland, also called George.

Both George III and the Duke of Kent died in January 1820. The Prince Regent became George IV and Victoria was third in line to the throne after her uncles, the Duke of York and Duke of Clarence (the future William IV). She would ultimately take the throne as Queen Victoria in 1837.

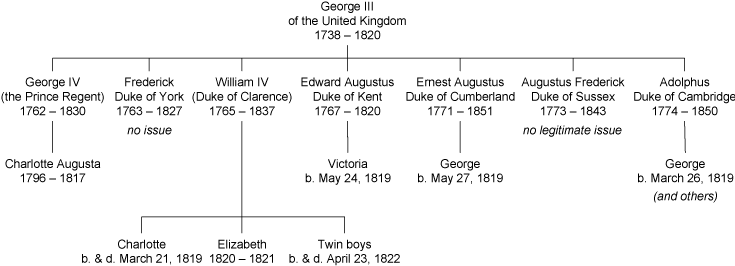
A pedigree showing the succession of Victoria to the throne

== Controversy ==
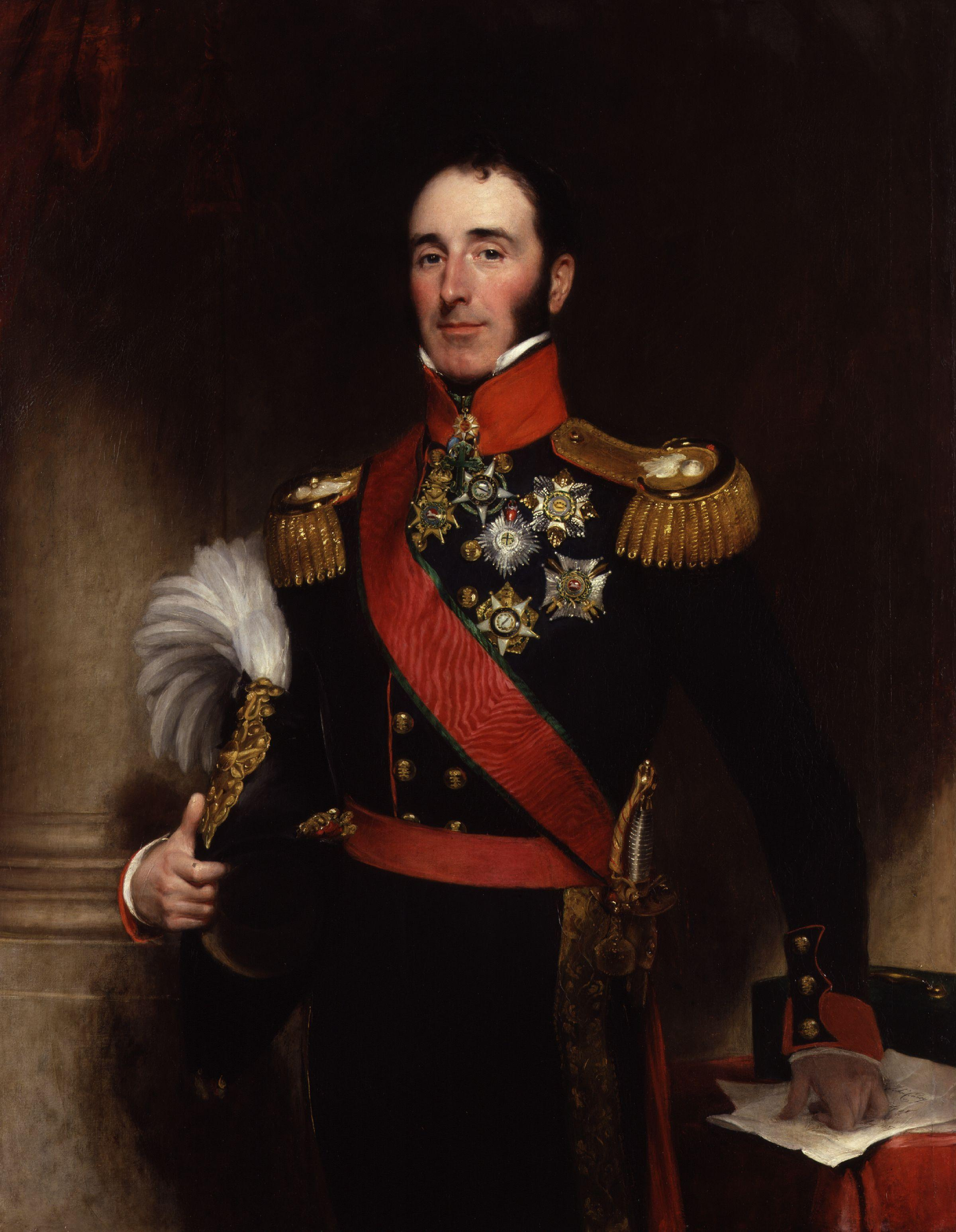
Portrait of John Conroy by Henry William Pickersgill, 1837

Rumours about Victoria's parentage centred on a controversial Irish soldier and adventurer called Sir John Conroy who was her mother's private secretary and the comptroller of her household. The Duchess of Kent was the same age as Conroy, whereas she was nineteen years younger than her husband; the court gossiped openly about their relationship. After the Duke's death, Conroy assumed a parental role towards Victoria that she bitterly resented. This caused a near permanent rift between Victoria and her mother, as well as between the Duchess and her brother-in-law, William IV. Conroy expected that when Victoria became queen he would be made her private secretary, but instead one of her first acts as monarch was to dismiss him from her household.

The belief that the Duchess and Conroy were lovers was widespread. When asked by Charles Greville whether he believed they were lovers, the Duke of Wellington replied that he "supposed so". The Duke later recounted a story that when Victoria was young she had caught Conroy and the Duchess engaged in what were diplomatically called "some familiarities". Wellington reported that she told Baroness Louise Lehzen, who told her close ally, Madame de Späth, who confronted the Duchess about her behaviour. According to Wellington, the Duchess of Kent was furious and promptly dismissed de Späth. Victoria, when queen, appears to have disputed the story, stating that her mother's piety would have prevented any undue familiarity with Conroy.

== Genetics ==
A. N. Wilson suggested that Victoria's father could not have been the Duke of Kent for two reasons:

- The sudden appearance of hæmophilia in the descendants of Victoria. The illness did not exist in the royal family before.
- The supposed disappearance of porphyria from the descendants of Victoria. According to Wilson, the disease was prevalent in the royal family before Victoria but not afterwards.

The argument was first proposed in (Potts and Potts, 1995).

Both arguments can be countered. Since most hæmophilia is X-linked (most importantly, hæmophilia B, which is now known to be what Queen Victoria passed to her descendants), in order for a father to transmit the condition he must have it himself, but Conroy was healthy. Hæmophiliacs were unlikely to survive in the early nineteenth century due to the lack of effective treatments. Indeed, life expectancy was 11 years or younger, even into the later half of the twentieth century, and is still as low in developing countries. Nor is there evidence of hæmophilia in either Conroy's ancestors or descendants, or any mention of any hæmophiliacs in any document associated with the Kents. It is likely that the mutation arose spontaneously because the Duke of Kent was 50 when Victoria was conceived; hæmophilia-causing mutations arise more frequently in the children of older fathers, and spontaneous mutations account for about 30% of cases.

With regard to porphyria, there is no genetic evidence that the royal family even had the disease, and its diagnosis in George III's case (and others) has been questioned. Not all porphyria is passed down genetically, and even if the diagnosis of hereditary porphyria is correct, it may well have continued among descendants of Queen Victoria. Her daughter Victoria, Princess Royal, as well as her daughter, Charlotte of Prussia, are suspected to have suffered from it, as is another descendant of Queen Victoria's, Prince William of Gloucester.

Concrete evidence on the origins of the hæmophilia disease and paternity of Victoria could be achieved with a DNA test of her or her parents' remains, but no such study has been sanctioned by the royal family.
