= Alexander Cambridge, 1st Earl of Athlone =

British Army general and colonial administrator (1874–1957)

Major-General The Right Honourable The Earl of Athlone KG GCB GCMG GCVO DSO KStJ PC FRS
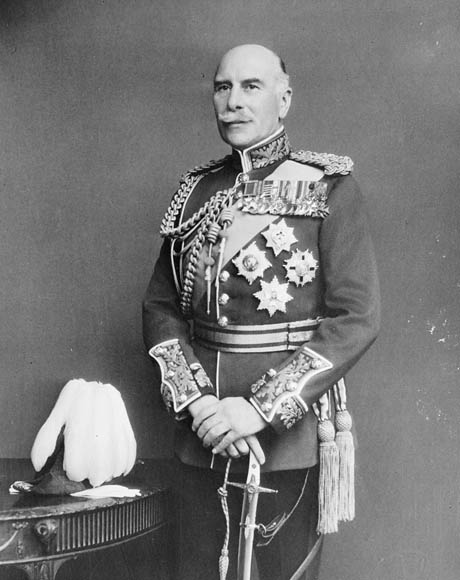
- Portrait of Athlone, c. 1940

16th Governor General of Canada
- In office 21 June 1940 – 12 April 1946
- Monarch: George VI
- Prime Minister: William Lyon Mackenzie King
- Preceded by: The Lord Tweedsmuir
- Succeeded by: The Viscount Alexander of Tunis

4th Governor-General of South Africa
- In office 21 January 1924 – 21 December 1930
- Monarch: George V
- Prime Minister: Jan Smuts; J. B. M. Hertzog
- Preceded by: Prince Arthur of Connaught
- Succeeded by: The Earl of Clarendon

Personal details
- Born: Prince Alexander of Teck; 14 April 1874 Kensington Palace, London, England
- Died: 16 January 1957 (aged 82) Kensington Palace, London, England
- Resting place: Royal Vault, St George's Chapel, Windsor Castle; later Royal Burial Ground, Frogmore
- Spouse: Princess Alice of Albany (m. 1904)
- Children: Lady May Abel Smith; Rupert Cambridge, Viscount Trematon; Prince Maurice of Teck
- Parent(s): Francis, Duke of Teck; Princess Mary Adelaide of Cambridge
- Education: Eton College; Royal Military College, Sandhurst
- Profession: Army officer
- Awards: See below...

Military service
- Allegiance: United Kingdom
- Branch/service: British Army
- Years of service: 1894–1931
- Rank: Major-General
- Battles/wars: Second Matabele War; Second Boer War; World War I

Alexander Cambridge, 1st Earl of Athlone (Alexander Augustus Frederick William Alfred George; born Prince Alexander of Teck; 14 April 1874 – 16 January 1957) was a member of the extended British royal family, as a great-grandson of King George III, the youngest brother of Queen Mary, an uncle of Kings Edward VIII and George VI, and the husband of Princess Alice of Albany. He was a British Army officer and served as Governor-General of the Union of South Africa and Governor General of Canada.

Alexander was born in Kensington, the youngest son of Francis, Duke of Teck, and Princess Mary Adelaide of Cambridge, and was educated at Eton and the Royal Military College, Sandhurst. In 1904, he married Princess Alice of Albany and rose in military rank through his service on the western front of the First World War, receiving numerous honours and decorations.

A cousin and also brother-in-law of King George V, Alexander relinquished his German titles in 1917, including that of Prince of Teck in the Kingdom of Württemberg, and was elevated to the peerage of the United Kingdom as the first Earl of Athlone. In 1923, the King appointed Athlone as Governor-General of South Africa, on the recommendation of British prime minister Stanley Baldwin, and he occupied the viceregal post until 1930. Athlone then served as Chancellor of the University of London until, in 1940, his nephew George VI appointed him as Governor General of Canada, on the recommendation of Canadian prime minister William Lyon Mackenzie King. He occupied the post until 1946. Athlone helped galvanise the Canadian war effort and was a host to British and American statesmen during the Second World War.

After returning to the United Kingdom, Athlone sat on the organising committee for the coronation of Queen Elizabeth II, his great-niece. He died at Kensington Palace in 1957 and was interred in the Royal Burial Ground, Frogmore.

== Early life, education, and military career ==
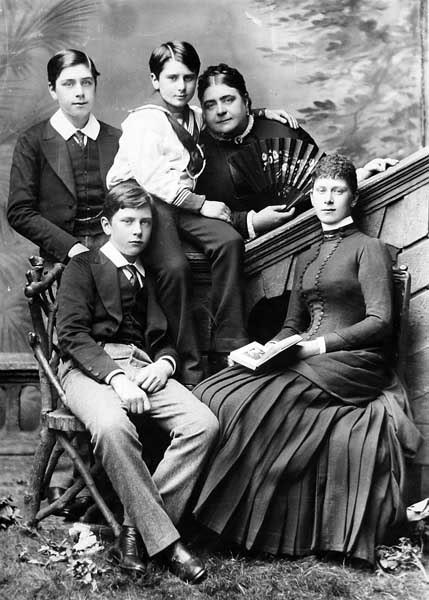
The Duchess of Teck and her family c. 1880; Prince Alexander sits centre with his arm around the Duchess, Princess Mary (later Queen Mary) is seated at far right

Alexander was born on 14 April 1874 at Kensington Palace, the fourth child and third son of Prince Francis, Duke of Teck, and Princess Mary Adelaide, Duchess of Teck. Although his mother was a granddaughter of King George III and a first cousin of Queen Victoria, Athlone, as the son of a prince of Teck in Württemberg, was styled from birth as His Serene Highness and held the title Prince Alexander of Teck. He was known, however, to his family and friends as Alge, derived from the first two letters of Alexander and George, and was characterised as a meticulous individual with a quick, but short-lived, temper and an ability to be cautious and tactful.

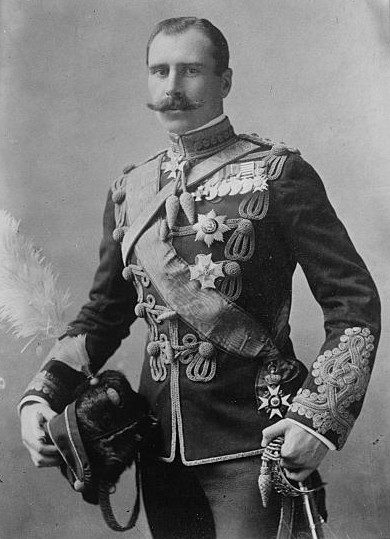
Prince Alexander of Teck, 28 June 1910, wearing the insignia of the Royal Victorian Order, and the star and sash of the Order of the Rue Crown of Saxony

When Alexander was nine years old, his parents fled the United Kingdom for continental Europe to escape their high debts. They stayed there for two years. Alexander remained at Eton College before moving on to the Royal Military College, Sandhurst. In October 1894, having completed his officer's training, he was commissioned as a second lieutenant in the 7th Queen's Own Hussars, and shortly after served in the Second Matabele War. Alexander was mentioned in despatches during the conflict and, after its cessation, was appointed on 8 December 1898 by Queen Victoria as a Knight Commander of the Royal Victorian Order. He received a promotion to lieutenant in June 1899 and to captain the following April. For his actions in the Second Boer War, Alexander was, in April 1901, appointed by King Edward VII as a Companion of the Distinguished Service Order.

The announcement came on 16 November 1903 that Alexander had become engaged to his second cousin once removed, Princess Alice of Albany, daughter of Prince Leopold, Duke of Albany, and thus a granddaughter of Queen Victoria and niece of the then soon-to-be Governor General of Canada, Prince Arthur, Duke of Connaught and Strathearn. They were married at St. George's Chapel, in Windsor Castle, on 10 February 1904 and, six days later, in celebration of the wedding, the Prince was promoted to the grade of a Knight Grand Cross of the Royal Victorian Order. The couple thereafter had three children: Princess May of Teck, born 1906; Prince Rupert of Teck, born 1907; and Prince Maurice Francis George of Teck. Maurice, however, lived only for less than six months between 29 March and 14 September 1910.

That same year, Alexander was appointed Chairman of Middlesex Hospital.

== First World War ==
Prior to the outbreak of the Great War in 1914, Alexander, who had been promoted to major in January 1911 and was a brevet lieutenant-colonel commanding the 2nd Regiment of Life Guards, was nominated by the British Prime Minister H. H. Asquith to serve as Governor General of Canada. However, Alexander was called up for active service with his regiment. taking him to battle in France and Flanders. He was promoted to the rank of lieutenant colonel, with the temporary rank of brigadier-general, in December 1915. For his service on the battlefields, in June 1917 Alexander was appointed by his brother in law, King George V, as a Companion of the Order of St Michael and St George.

During the war, anti-German sentiment throughout the British Empire led the King to change the name of the royal house from the German House of Saxe-Coburg and Gotha to the more English House of Windsor, while simultaneously renouncing all German titles for himself and all members of the Royal Family. Through a royal warrant issued on 14 July 1917, Alexander, along with his brother, Prince Adolphus, Duke of Teck, similarly relinquished all of his German titles, styles, and honours, choosing instead the name of Cambridge, after his grandfather, Prince Adolphus, Duke of Cambridge. Alexander was then known simply as Sir Alexander Cambridge (being entitled to the honorific Sir through his knighthoods in the Royal Victorian Order and the Order of the Bath), until, on 7 November 1917, the King created him Earl of Athlone and Viscount Trematon, in the County of Cambridge. Athlone had declined a marquessate, as he thought the title did not sound British enough. Athlone's wife retained her royal style and title, while their surviving children became the Lady May Cambridge and Rupert Cambridge, Viscount Trematon. Rupert was the heir apparent to the title of Earl of Athlone, but he died on 15 April 1928 following a car crash, ten days shy of his twenty-first birthday, and the third creation of the earldom later became extinct with the death of the first earl.

== Post-war career and Governor-General of the Union of South Africa ==
Following the cessation of hostilities in Europe in 1918, Athlone was promoted to the brevet rank of colonel in June 1919, and retired from the army that November, with the honorary rank of brigadier-general. He took up posts in the civilian world, continuing at Middlesex Hospital. Because of his experience there, he was appointed in 1921 to chair an investigative committee on the needs of doctors. Known as the Athlone Committee, its work resulted in the creation of post-graduate schools for medical education and research, such as the Royal Postgraduate Medical School at Hammersmith Hospital and the London School of Hygiene & Tropical Medicine. In March 1922, he was promoted to the rank of colonel in the Regular Army Reserves, retaining his honorary rank of brigadier-general, and, in 1937, was appointed chair of a committee of inquiry into the arrangements for "recruitment, training and registration and terms and conditions of service" for nurses.

For their London residence, the Athlones used the grace and favour apartments of Princess Alice's mother, the late Duchess of Albany, in the Clock House at Kensington Palace and, in 1923, they acquired a country residence, Brantridge Park, in West Sussex.

In December of the same year, Athlone was appointed by the King as both an honorary major-general and as the Governor-General of the Union of South Africa, replacing his wife's cousin, Prince Arthur of Connaught. He arrived in Pretoria in January 1924 and was immediately at work with his viceregal duties, opening the newly finished parliament building, just weeks before his South African prime minister, Jan Smuts, suddenly advised him to prorogue the legislature.

In the ensuing election—the running of which forced Athlone to cancel the planned tour of Prince Edward, Prince of Wales—the National Party won a majority of seats in the House of Assembly, meaning Athlone appointed the party's leader, James Barry Munnik Hertzog, as his new prime minister. At the time, Afrikaner nationalism was increasing in the dominion, and Hertzog was a republican who promoted the secession of South Africa from the British Empire. As such, he proposed the country adopt its own flag over the Union Flag. Athlone, however, proved sympathetic and tactful, and resolved the issue by advancing a flag that was unique to South Africa, but which still contained the Union Flag within it, despite opposition from numerous Afrikaners. He also gained popularity with South Africans of all races through his frequent tours of the country, performing a number of ceremonial duties, including opening Pioneers' Park in Johannesburg.

For his service to the Crown in South Africa, Athlone was appointed by George V as a Knight Companion of the Order of the Garter, on 17 April 1928, and, upon his return to the UK, was made on 4 August 1931 the Governor and Constable of Windsor Castle. The following year, he was also selected as the Chancellor of the University of London, which post he held until 1955. In May 1936 he succeeded Field Marshal Edmund Allenby, 1st Viscount Allenby as colonel of The Life Guards, an appointment he held until his death.

In 1937 he led the Ministry of Health and Board of Education Interim Report of the Interdepartmental Committee on Nursing Services, also known as The Athlone Report. It looked at nursing recruitment, retention and skills and included Dame Ellen Musson

In January 1939, Athlone was appointed president of The Football Association. The move represented the first time the FA had appointed someone that was not a football administrator to the position.

== Governor General of Canada ==
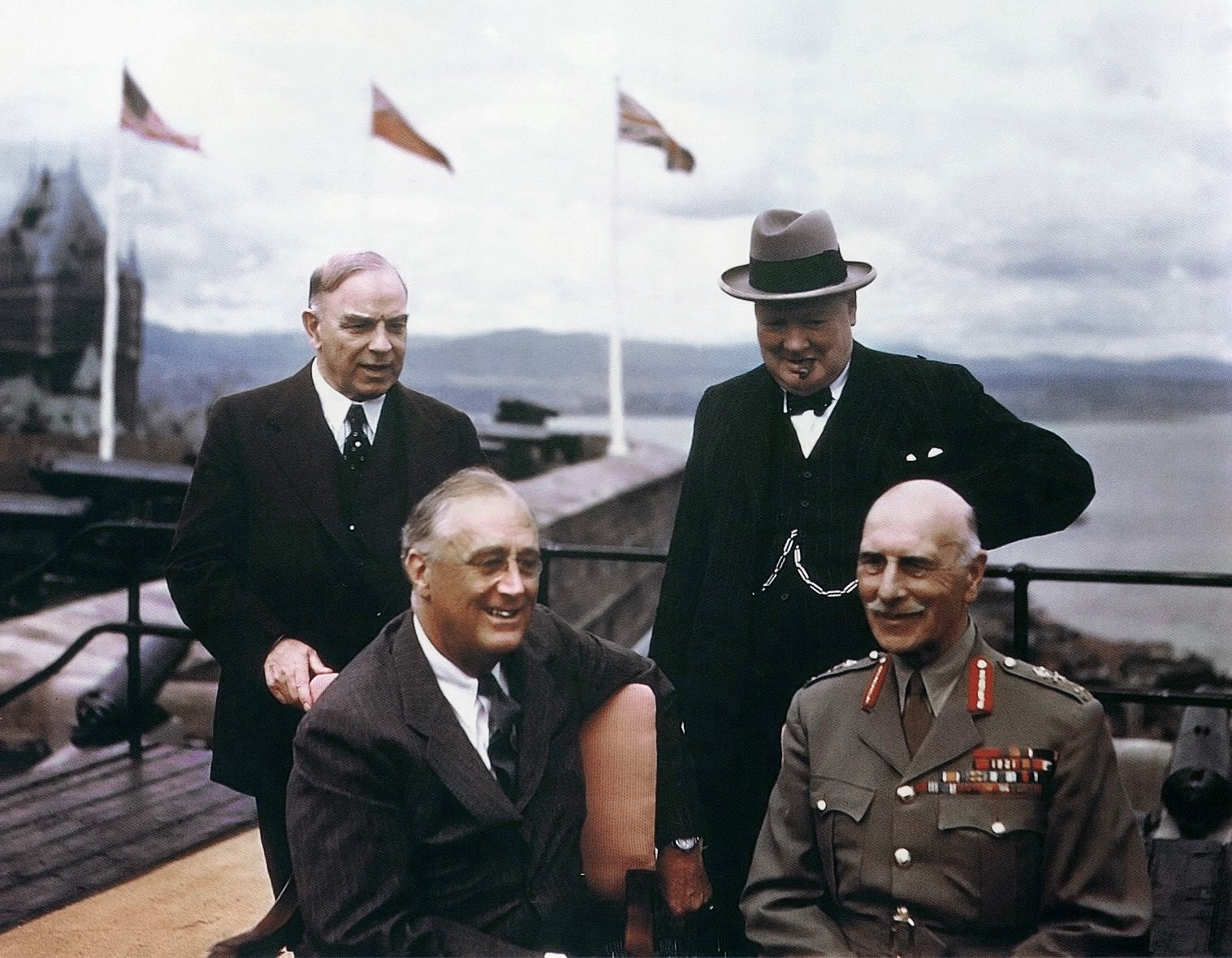
The Earl of Athlone (seated right) with (left to right) Canadian Prime Minister Mackenzie King, US President Roosevelt, and UK Prime Minister Churchill, at La Citadelle, August 1943

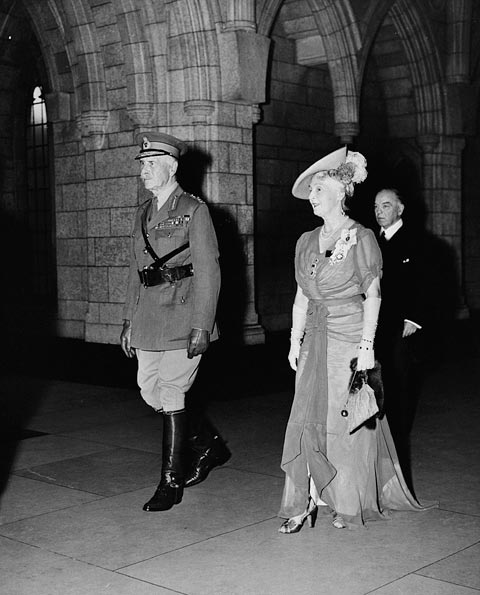
The Earl of Athlone and his wife, Princess Alice, followed by Prime Minister Mackenzie King at the State Opening of Parliament, 6 September 1945

In Canada in the late 1930s, there had been calls from government circles and the media alike for the King to appoint a Canadian-born individual as governor general. However, with the rush to fill the post after the unexpected death (on February 11, 1940) of the incumbent viceroy, Lord Tweedsmuir, and with the country embroiled in the Second World War, Canadian prime minister William Lyon Mackenzie King advised King George VI that the time was not right for such a change in viceregal tradition.

Instead, it was George's uncle, the Earl of Athlone, whose name Mackenzie King put forward and the Earl accepted. Subsequently, Athlone, along with his wife and his aide-de-camp, Alastair Windsor, Earl of Macduff, (Note: Lord Macduff (originally Prince Alastair of Connaught), who would succeed to the title of Duke of Connaught and Strathearn in 1942, was the grandson of the previous Governor General of Canada, Prince Arthur, Duke of Connaught and Strathearn, and the son of former South African governor general Prince Arthur of Connaught. He died at Rideau Hall in 1943.) voyaged to Canada to take up his position, their liner using a submarine-evading zig-zag pattern across the Atlantic Ocean to Halifax, Nova Scotia. After travelling on to Ottawa by train, Athlone was sworn in during a ceremony in the Senate chamber on 21 June 1940. The Athlones' three grandchildren, Anne, Richard, and Elizabeth (children of their daughter May), lived with them in Canada for the duration of the war.

Athlone immediately made himself active in the support of the war effort, travelling across the country and focusing much of his attention on the troops, either those training at military facilities or those injured and in hospital. Viewing his position as governor general as a link between Canadians and their monarch, Athlone also communicated in speeches that the King stood with them in their fight against Adolf Hitler and the Nazi regime.

The war was brought close to home for the Athlones also because many of those belonging to displaced European royal families sought refuge in Canada and resided at or near the royal and viceroyal residence, Rideau Hall. Among the royal guests were Crown Prince Olav and Crown Princess Märtha of Norway; Grand Duchess Charlotte and Prince Felix of Luxembourg; King Peter II of Yugoslavia; King George II of Greece; Empress Zita of Bourbon-Parma (Austria-Hungary) and her daughters; as well as Queen Wilhelmina of the Netherlands and her daughter, Princess Juliana. Further, in December 1941, British prime minister Winston Churchill arrived at the residence, where he presided over British Cabinet meetings via telephone from his bed.

It was Athlone's duty to play host at Quebec City to his prime minister, still Mackenzie King, as well as Churchill and President of the United States Franklin D. Roosevelt, who all gathered to take part in what would become known as the Quebec Conferences, with the first taking place between 17 and 24 August 1943 at the viceregal residence in La Citadelle, and the second occurring from 12 to 16 September 1944 at the Château Frontenac. It was at these meetings that the four men discussed the Allied strategies that would eventually lead to victory over Nazi Germany and Japan. When Germany fell on 8 May 1945 and Japan on 15 August of the same year, Athlone led the national celebrations held on Parliament Hill and elsewhere. He thereafter spoke in speeches about Canada's future being marked not by war but by a strong role in reconstruction and reconciliation.

During his time as the Canadian viceroy, Athlone also lent his status to various charitable and other social events, and mounted a number of activities of his own, such as tobogganing parties and skating lessons on the grounds of Rideau Hall, as well as skiing in Gatineau Park. When he departed Canada at the end of his time as the King's representative, Athlone left as a legacy the Athlone Fellowship, awarded by the Engineering Institute of Canada.

== Post-viceregal life ==
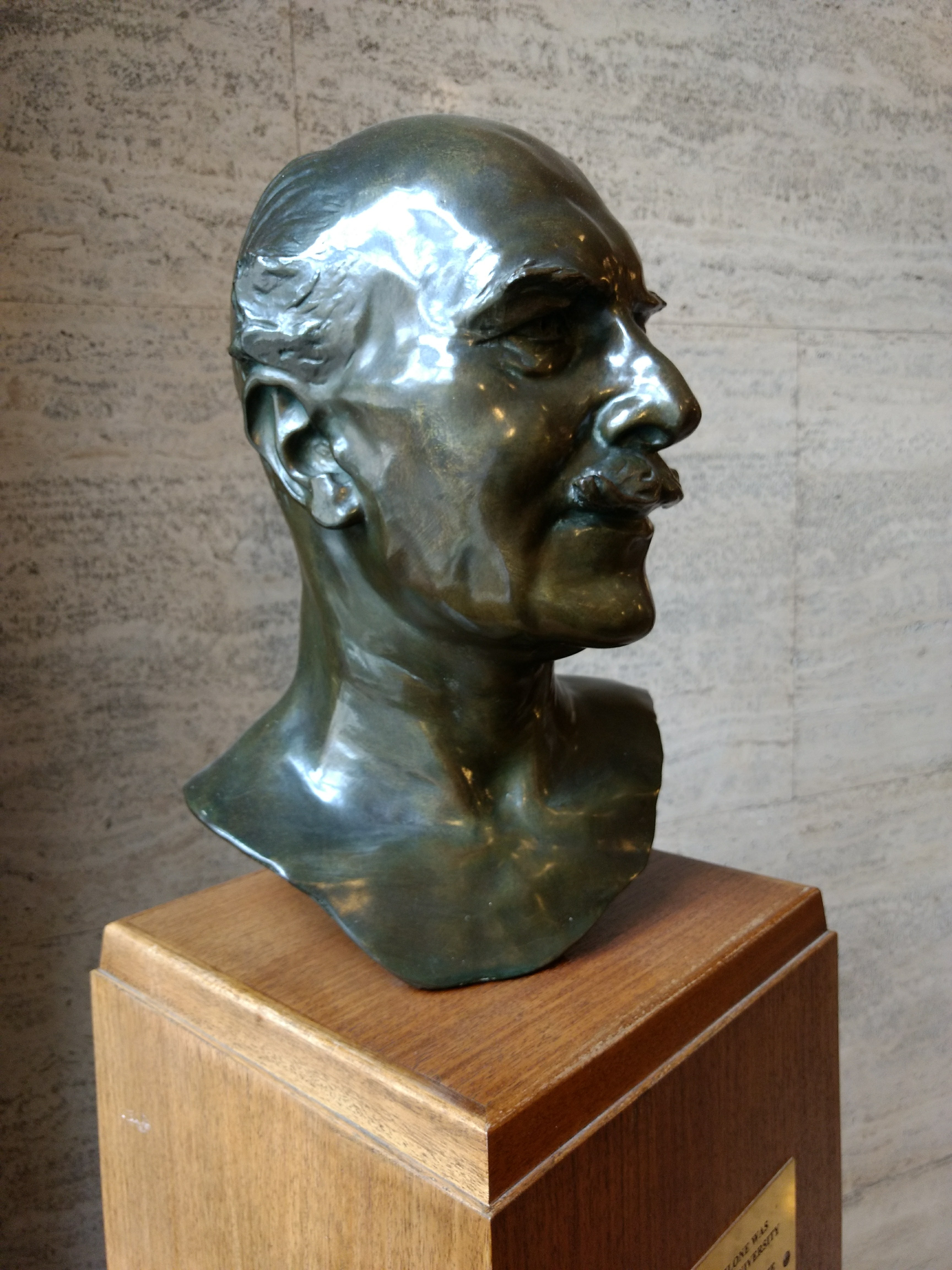
Bust of the Earl of Athlone, Senate House, University of London.

After Lord Athlone's replacement as governor general was appointed on 21 March 1946, he returned to the United Kingdom to retirement, taking up residence again in a grace and favour apartment at Kensington Palace and, on 1 September of that year, resigning as colonel of the 7th Queen's Own Hussars. He did not completely remove himself from public activity, however, and was, along with his Canadian viceregal successor, Lord Alexander of Tunis, appointed to the committee charged with organising the coronation in 1953 of Athlone's great-niece, Queen Elizabeth II, and continued to sit as Chancellor of the University of London until 1955.

The Earl of Athlone died at Kensington on 16 January 1957 at the age of 82, and was interred in the Royal Vault at St George's Chapel, Windsor Castle, on 19 January before being transferred to the Royal Burial Ground at Frogmore on 15 May 1957. He was the last surviving great-grandchild of George III.

== Titles and honours ==
=== Military ranks ===
- 23 October 1894; Second Lieutenant
- 8 August 1899; Lieutenant
- 6 April 1900; Captain
- 17 February 1911; Major
- 10 January 1916; Brevet Lieutenant Colonel
- 10 January 1916; Temporary Brigadier-General
- 10 January 1916; Brevet Colonel
- 5 November 1919; Honorary Brigadier-General
- 30 November 1923; Honorary Major General

=== Orders and decorations ===
==== British ====
===== Orders of Chivalry =====
- (England) KG: Knight Companion of the Most Noble Order of the Garter, 17 April 1928
- KCVO: Knight Commander of the Royal Victorian Order,13 December 1898
  - GCVO: Knight Grand Cross of the Royal Victorian Order, 16 February 1904
- (United Kingdom) DSO: Companion of the Distinguished Service Order, 19 April 1901
- (United Kingdom) KStJ: Knight of Justice of the Most Venerable Order of the Hospital of Saint John of Jerusalem, 14 June 1917
- (United Kingdom) GCB: Knight Grand Cross of the Most Honourable Order of the Bath (civil division), 19 June 1911
- (United Kingdom) CMG: Companion of the Most Distinguished Order of Saint Michael and Saint George, 4 June 1917
  - (United Kingdom) GCMG: Knight Grand Cross of the Most Distinguished Order of Saint Michael and Saint George, 6 November 1923
  - (United Kingdom) Grand Master of the Most Distinguished Order of Saint Michael and Saint George, 24 June 1936

===== Decorations =====
- Royal Victorian Chain, 28 December 1934

===== Campaign medals =====
- (United Kingdom) British South Africa Company Medal with Mention in Despatches, 1897
- (United Kingdom) Queen's South Africa Medal, 1901
- (United Kingdom) 1914–15 Star, 1919
- (United Kingdom) British War Medal, 1919
- (United Kingdom) Victory Medal with two Mentions in Despatches, 1919
- (United Kingdom) 1939–45 Star, 1945
- (United Kingdom) War Medal 1939–1945, 1945
- (Canada) Canadian Volunteer Service Medal, 1947

Coronation/jubilee medals:

- (United Kingdom) 1897: Queen Victoria Diamond Jubilee Medal, 20 June 1897
- (United Kingdom) 1902: King Edward VII Coronation Medal, 9 August 1902
- (United Kingdom) 1911: King George V Coronation Medal, 22 June 1911
- (United Kingdom) 1935: King George V Silver Jubilee Medal, 6 May 1935
- (United Kingdom) 1937: King George VI Coronation Medal, 12 May 1937
- (United Kingdom) 1953: Queen Elizabeth II Coronation Medal, 2 June 1953

==== Foreign ====
===== Appointments =====
- Grand Cross of the Order of the Württemberg Crown, 1888 – 14 July 1917
- (Kingdom of Saxony) Knight of the Order of the Rue Crown , 1904 – 14 July 1917
- Grand Cross with Crown in Ore of the House Order of the Wendish Crown, 22 July 1904 – 17 July 1917
- (Sweden) KmstkNO: Commander Grand Cross of the Royal Order of the Polar Star, 1909
- (Belgium) Grand Cordon of the Order of Leopold, 24 October 1915
- (France) Grand Officer of the National Order of the Legion of Honour, 9 December 1916
- (Russian Empire) Knight First Class with Swords of the Imperial Order of Saint Anna, 14 January 1918

Decorations

- (Belgium) Military Cross, second class, 24 February 1916
- (France) Croix de Guerre with palm, 16 April 1918

==== Undress ribbons ====
The undress ribbons worn by Lord Athlone in undress uniform were as follows:

=== Honorary appointments ===
==== Personal Aide-de-Camp (ADC) ====
- King George V, 3 June 1910
- King Edward VIII, 23 June 1936
- King George VI, 5 February 1937
- Queen Elizabeth II, 6 March 1953
- Honorary military appointments
- (South Africa) Colonel-in-Chief of the Duke of Edinburgh's Own Rifles, 1930
- Governor and Constable of Windsor Castle, 4 August 1931
- (United Kingdom) Colonel of the Life Guards, 1936
- (Canada) Colonel of the Governor General's Horse Guards, 21 June 1940 – 12 April 1946
- (Canada) Colonel of the Governor General's Foot Guards, 21 June 1940 – 12 April 1946
- (Canada) Colonel of the Canadian Grenadier Guards, 21 June 1940 – 12 April 1946
- Honorary Member of the Royal Military College of Canada Club, 1940

=== Civil ===
- (United Kingdom) PC: Member of His Majesty's Most Honourable Privy Council, 31 June 1931
- (United Kingdom) FRS: Fellow of the Royal Society, 1937
- Chief Scout for Canada, 21 June 1940

=== Honorific eponyms ===
==== Awards ====
- (South Africa) : Athlone Institute Bursary Project Fund, Paarl

==== Geographic locations ====
- Alberta: Athlone, Edmonton
- Newfoundland and Labrador: Athlone
- South Africa: Athlone, Cape Town

==== Buildings ====
- South Africa: Athlone Power Station, Cape Town
- South Africa: Athlone Stadium, Cape Town

==== Schools ====
- Alberta: Athlone Elementary School, Edmonton
- Manitoba: Athlone School, Winnipeg
- South Africa: Athlone House, Queen's College, Queenstown
- South Africa: Athlone Boys High School, Johannesburg
- South Africa: Athlone Institute, Paarl

== Arms ==
Coat of arms of Alexander Cambridge, 1st Earl of Athlone
Crest A Dog's Head and Neck lozengy bendy sinister Sable and Or, langued Gules, a Crescent Argent, for difference. Coronet of an earl. Escutcheon Quarterly: 1st & 4th grand-quarters, The Royal Arms as borne by a son King George III, differenced by a Label of three-points Argent, the centre point charged with a Cross Gules, and each of the other points with two Hearts in pale Gules; 2nd & 3rd grand-quarters, Or, three Stags' Attires fesswise in pale, the points of each Attire to the sinister Sable, impaling Or three Lions passant in pale Sable, langued Gules, the dexter forepaws Gules; over all an Inescutcheon lozengy bendy sinister Sable and Or (Teck); Over all at the fess point a Crescent Sable for difference. Supporters Dexter: a Lion Sable, the dexter forepaw Gules, differenced on the shoulder by a Crescent Argent. Sinister: a Stag Proper, differenced on the shoulder by a Crescent Argent. Motto FEARLESS AND FAITHFUL Orders Order of the Garter (appointed 17 April 1928) Symbolism The second and third quarterings represent his descent from the Dukes of Württemberg

== Ancestry ==
Ancestors of Alexander Cambridge, 1st Earl of Athlone

8. Duke Louis of Württemberg
4. Duke Alexander of Württemberg
9. Princess Henriette of Nassau-Weilburg
2. Francis, Duke of Teck
10. Count László Rhédey von Kis-Rhéde
5. Countess Claudine Rhédey von Kis-Rhéde
11. Baroness Ágnes Inczédy von Nagy-Várad
1. Alexander Cambridge, 1st Earl of Athlone
12. George III of the United Kingdom
6. Prince Adolphus, Duke of Cambridge
13. Duchess Charlotte of Mecklenburg-Strelitz
3. Princess Mary Adelaide of Cambridge
14. Prince Frederick of Hesse-Kassel
7. Princess Augusta of Hesse-Kassel
15. Princess Caroline of Nassau-Usingen

== See also ==
- Rupert Cambridge, Viscount Trematon

== Notes ==
Government offices
Preceded by The Lord Tweedsmuir	Governor General of Canada; 1940–1946	Succeeded by The Earl Alexander of Tunis
Academic offices
Preceded by The Earl Beauchamp	Chancellor of the University of London; 1932–1955	Succeeded by Queen Elizabeth the Queen Mother
Honorary titles
Preceded by The Prince of Wales	Grand Master of the Order of Saint Michael and Saint George; 24 June 1936 – 16 January 1957	Succeeded by The Earl of Halifax
Preceded by The Viscount Esher	Constable and Governor of Windsor Castle; 1931–1957	Vacant Title next held by The Viscount Slim
