= Prince Maurice of Battenberg =

Hessian-British royal (1891–1914)

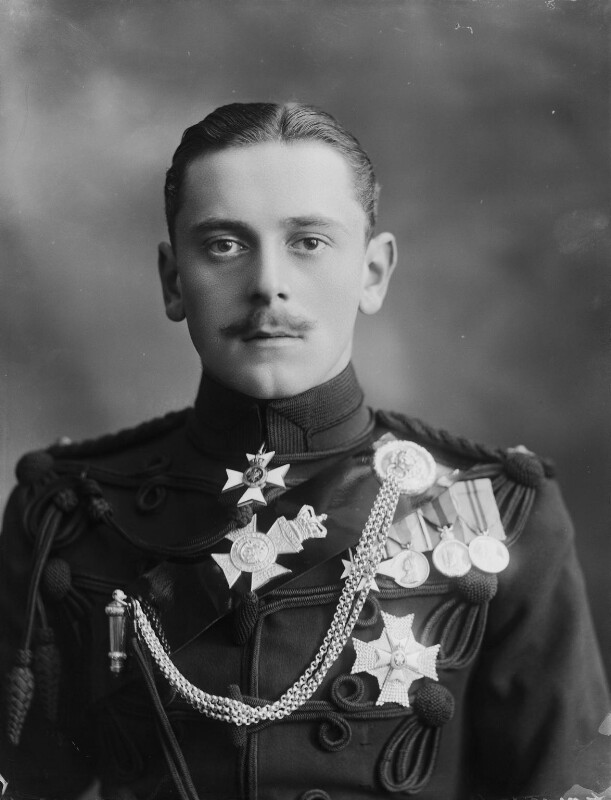
- Prince Maurice c. 1911
- Born: 3 October 1891; Balmoral Castle, United Kingdom
- Died: 27 October 1914 (aged 23); Zonnebeke, Belgium
- Burial: 31 October 1914; Ypres Town War Cemetery
Names
- Maurice Victor Donald
- Family: Battenberg
- Father: Prince Henry of Battenberg
- Mother: Princess Beatrice of the United Kingdom
- Military career
- Allegiance: United Kingdom
- Branch: British Army
- Rank: Lieutenant
- Unit: King's Royal Rifle Corps
- Conflicts: World War I; Western Front; Ypres Salient †

Prince Maurice of Battenberg (Maurice Victor Donald; 3 October 1891 – 27 October 1914) was a member of the Hessian princely Battenberg family and the extended British royal family, and the youngest grandchild of Queen Victoria. He was styled as Prince Maurice throughout his life and died before the Battenberg family anglicised their surname to Mountbatten in 1917, meaning he was never known by that name.

== Early life ==
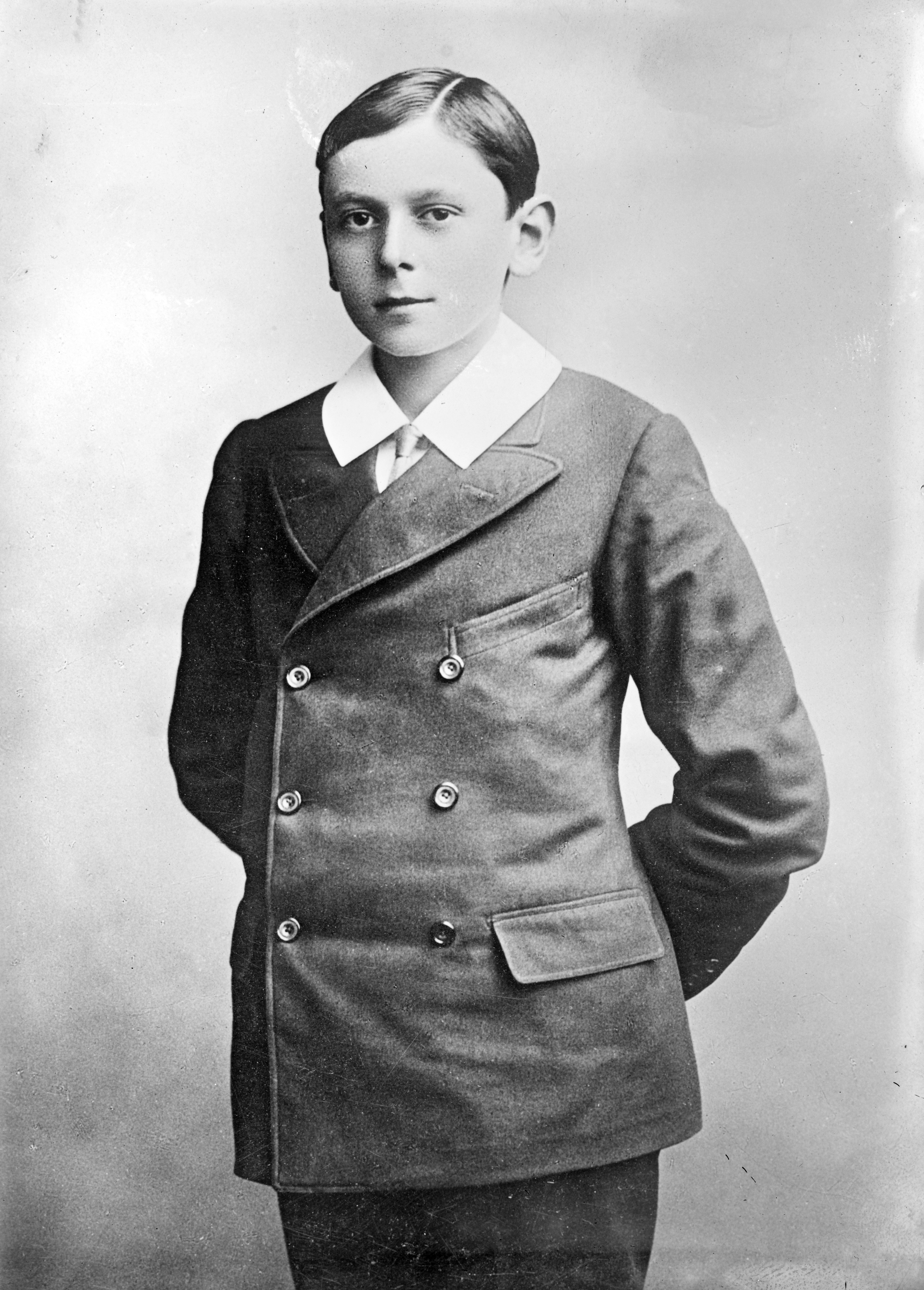
Prince Maurice of Battenberg circa 1900–1905

Maurice was born on 3 October 1891. His father was Prince Henry of Battenberg, the son of Prince Alexander of Hesse and by Rhine and Julie Therese née Countess of Hauke. His mother was Princess Henry of Battenberg (née Princess Beatrice of the United Kingdom), the fifth daughter and the youngest child of Queen Victoria and Albert, Prince Consort.

As he was the child of a morganatic marriage, Prince Henry of Battenberg took his style of Prince of Battenberg from his mother, Countess Julia Hauke, who was created Princess of Battenberg in her own right. As such, Maurice was styled as His Serene Highness Prince Maurice of Battenberg from birth. In the United Kingdom, he was styled His Highness Prince Maurice of Battenberg under a royal warrant passed by Queen Victoria in 1886. He was baptised in the Drawing Room at Balmoral on 31 October 1891. His godparents were the Duchess of Connaught and Strathearn (represented by Queen Victoria), the Princess of Leiningen (represented by Princess Christian of Schleswig-Holstein), the Duke of Clarence and Avondale (represented by Sir Henry Ponsonby), Prince Francis Joseph of Battenberg (represented by Sir Fleetwood Edwards) and the Hereditary Grand Duke of Hesse.

The youngest of his four siblings, Maurice most resembled his father, who died when he was only four, the same age his mother was when her own father died. He was his mother's favourite out of his brothers. He was educated at Lockers Park Prep School in Hertfordshire.

His elder sister Victoria Eugenie of Battenberg married Alfonso XIII of Spain and was Queen Consort of Spain between 1906 and 1931.

== Later life ==
Maurice attended Wellington College and was a member of Benson House. Maurice was made a Freemason in the Old Wellingtonian Lodge No. 3404 (the Lodge of the Old Wellingtonians) on 21 June 1912 and was installed Master of the Twelve Brothers Lodge, No. 785 Southampton on 22 April 1914.

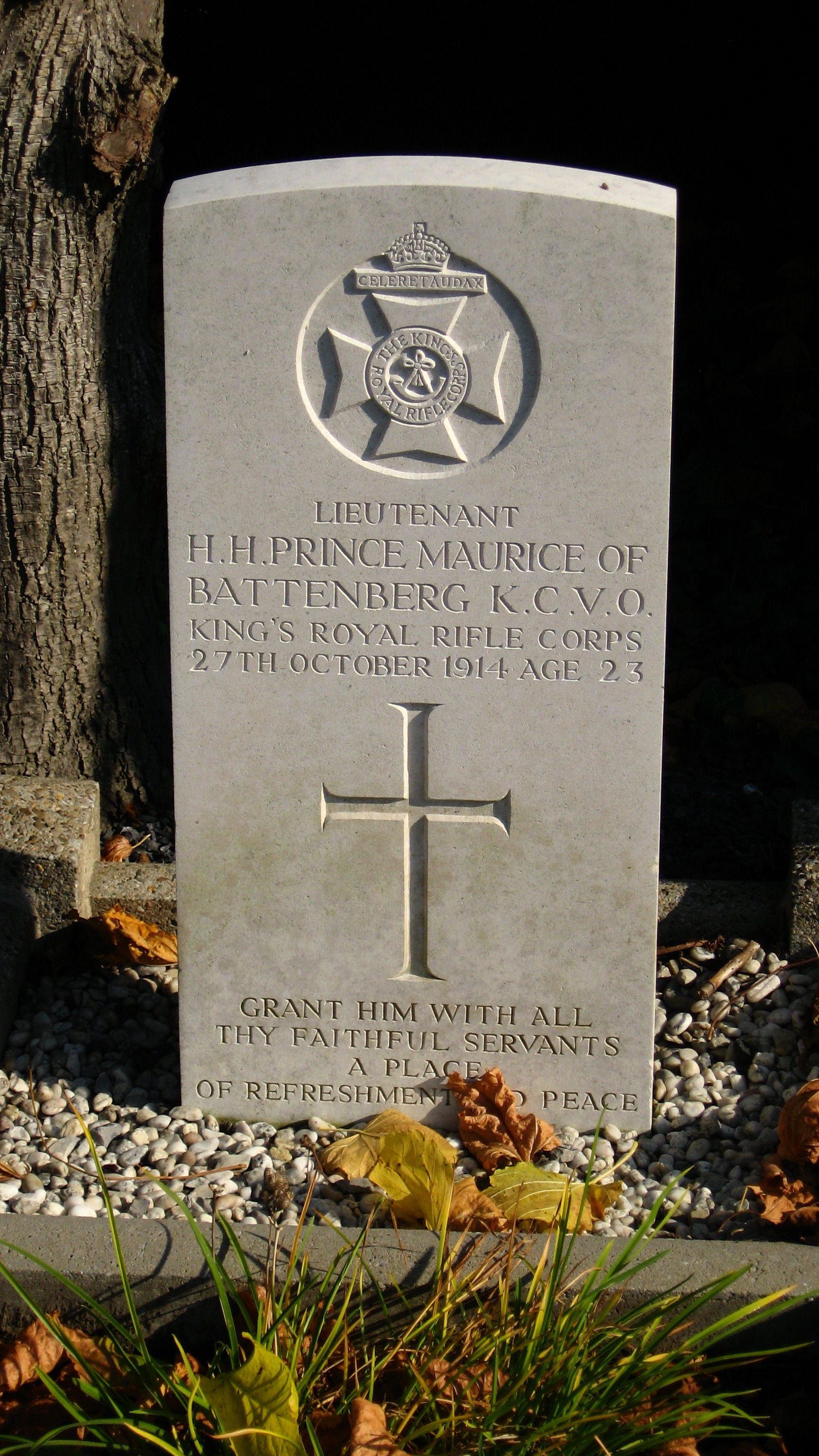
Grave of Prince Maurice of Battenberg in Ypres, Belgium.

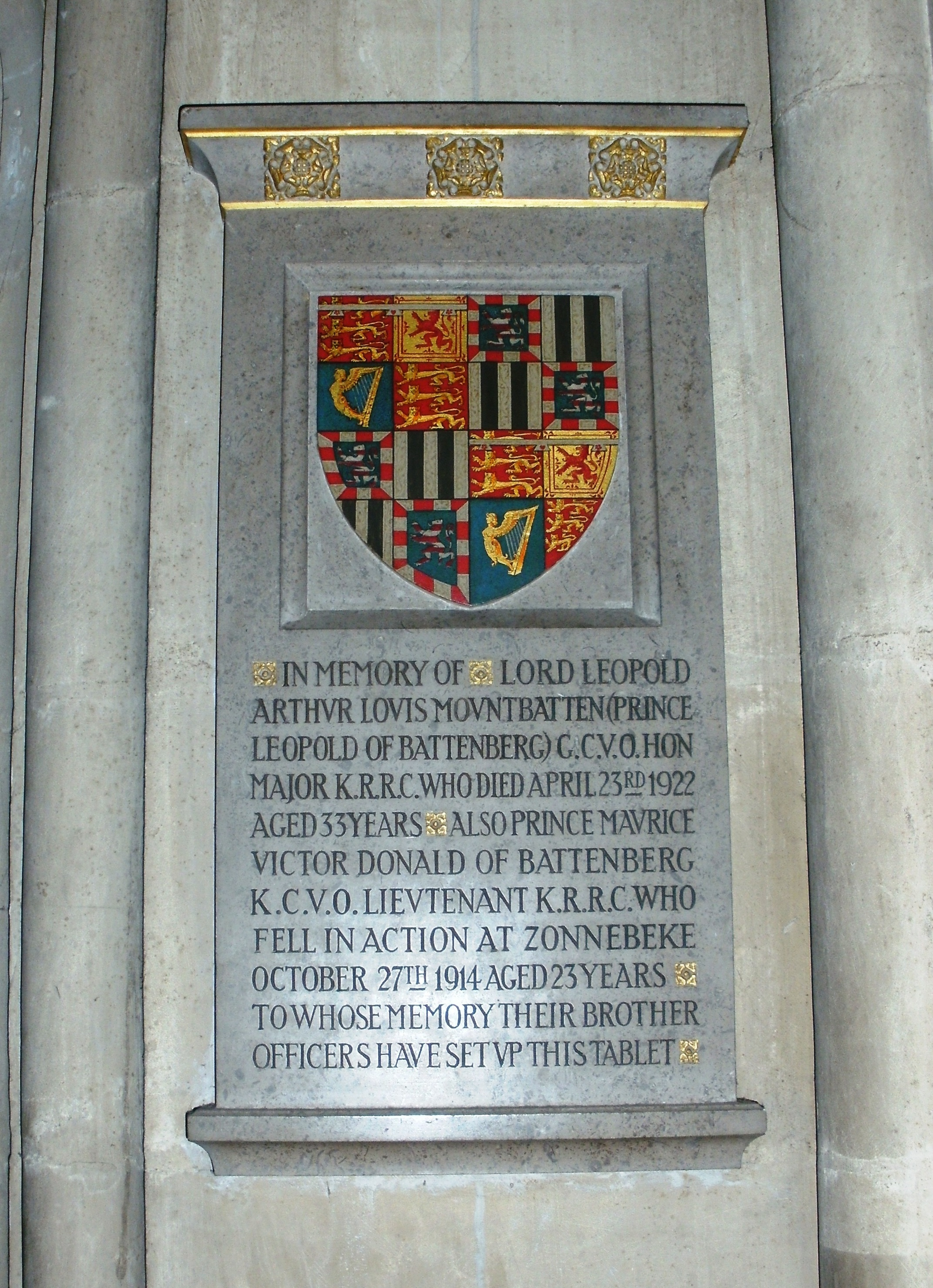
Winchester Cathedral, memorial to Prince Maurice and his brother Leopold

After attending the Royal Military College, Sandhurst, Maurice was commissioned as a second lieutenant in the King's Royal Rifle Corps on 4 March 1911. He was promoted to lieutenant effective from 13 February 1914. He served in World War I, and was killed in action at Zonnebeke, in the Ypres Salient, on 27 October 1914.

The 1st Battalion war diary states "During the advance eastwards from the ridge the battalion came under terrific shell fire as well as rifle fire... Poor [Prince] Maurice was killed outright just on top of the ridge."

Word of Maurice's death was passed to Brigadier-General Fanshawe, commander of the 6th Infantry Brigade. He in turn passed the news to 2nd Division Commander Major-General Sir Charles Munro. Munro spoke with the Brigadier at 23.30 before informing 1st Army Corps Commander Lieutenant-General Douglas Haig. Haig was sent the message that he "was killed by a shell whilst gallantly leading his company forward to attack across a ridge, east of Zonnebeke". Haig shared the news with GHQ at 7.00 the next morning. He said, "By the death of H.H. Prince Maurice of Battenberg the Army loses a most gallant and valuable officer. In peace and war he has done his duty to King and Country". The final word was sent to the War Office by Sir John French, commander of the British Expeditionary Force, "with deep regret".

His mother, Princess Beatrice, declined the offer of Lord Kitchener to have her son's body repatriated. He is buried in Ypres Town Cemetery. The battalion war diary notes that his funeral took place on 31 October 1914 and records that, "Denison, Gough, the Sgt Major, Sgt O'Leary and a few others went down to poor Maurice's funeral in Ypres". His mother strove for some years to commission a personal memorial for his grave, but her efforts were thwarted by the official policy of marking all burials in a uniform manner, and he is therefore commemorated by a standard Imperial War Graves Commission headstone. It bears the inscription: GRANT HIM WITH ALL THY FAITHFUL SERVANTS A PLACE OF REFRESHMENT AND PEACE. His estate was valued at £3,147 in 1917 (or £152,400 in 2022 when adjusted for inflation).

A memorial tablet to him and his brother Leopold is in Winchester Cathedral. Anne, Princess Royal visited Prince Maurice's grave during a rededication of the Menin Gate in 2025.

== Honours ==
- KCVO: Knight Commander of the Royal Victorian Order

== Ancestry ==
Ancestors of Prince Maurice of Battenberg

8. Louis II, Grand Duke of Hesse and by Rhine
4. Prince Alexander of Hesse and by Rhine
9. Princess Wilhelmine of Baden
2. Prince Henry of Battenberg
10. Count Hans Moritz von Hauke
5. Julia, Princess of Battenberg
11. Sophie Lafontaine
1. Prince Maurice of Battenberg
12. Ernest I of Saxe-Coburg and Gotha
6. Prince Albert of Saxe-Coburg and Gotha
13. Princess Louise of Saxe-Gotha-Altenburg
3. Princess Beatrice of the United Kingdom
14. Prince Edward, Duke of Kent and Strathearn
7. Queen Victoria of the United Kingdom
15. Princess Victoria of Saxe-Coburg-Saalfeld
