= Alexandra Feodorovna (Alix of Hesse) =

Empress of Russia from 1894 to 1917

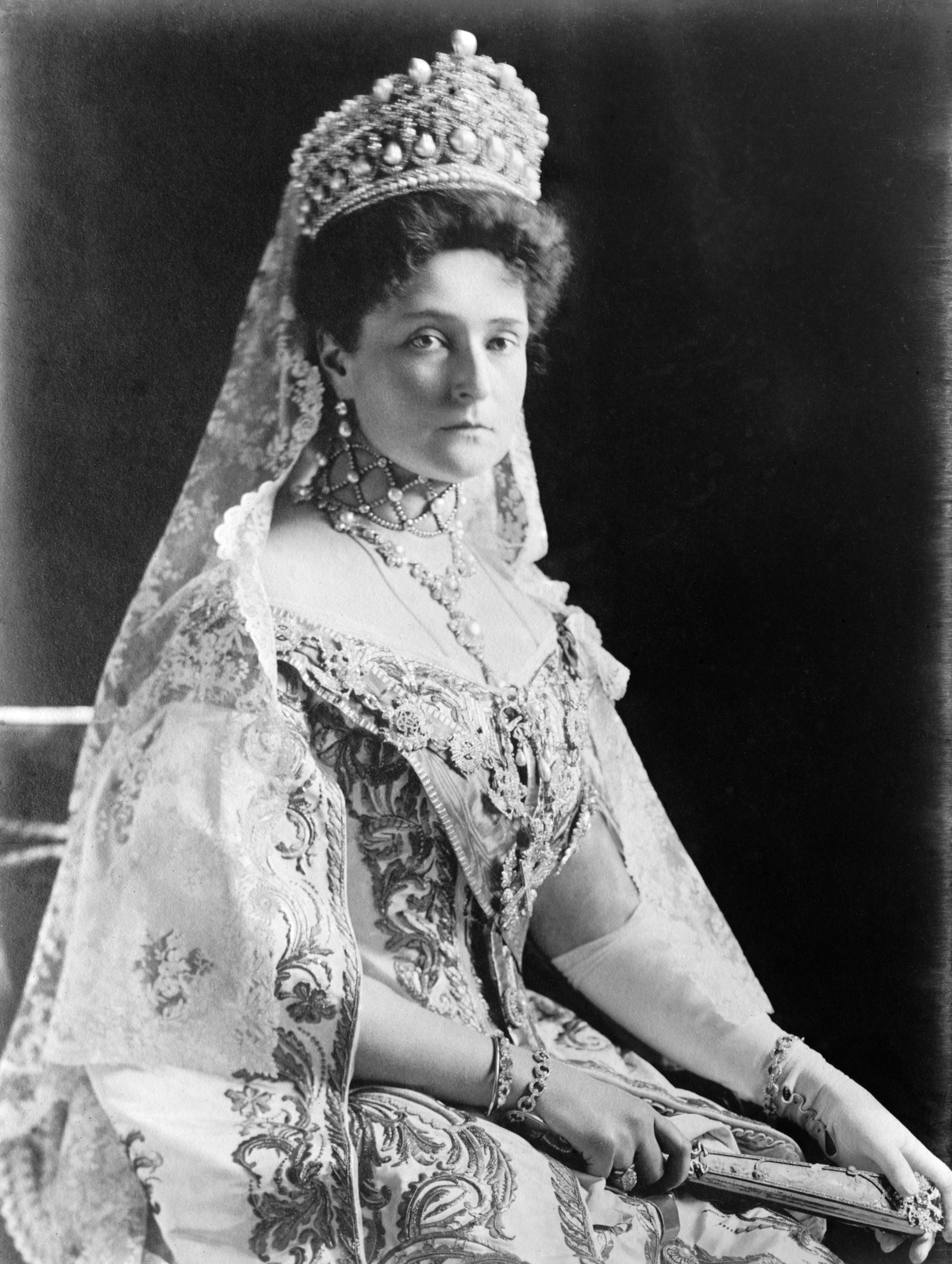
- Alexandra in 1908

Empress consort of Russia
- Tenure: 26 November 1894 – 15 March 1917
- Coronation: 26 May 1896
- Born: 6 June 1872; New Palace, Darmstadt, Germany
- Died: 17 July 1918 (aged 46); Ipatiev House, Yekaterinburg, Russia
- Cause of death: Gunshot wounds (murder)
- Burial: 17 July 1998; Saints Peter and Paul Cathedral, Saint Petersburg
- Spouse: Nicholas II of Russia (m. 1894)
- Issue: Grand Duchess Olga; Grand Duchess Tatiana; Grand Duchess Maria; Grand Duchess Anastasia; Tsarevich Alexei Nikolaevich
Names
- English: Alice Victoria Helena Louise Beatrice; German: Alix Viktoria Helene Luise Beatrix; Russian: Alexandra Feodorovna Romanova
- House: Hesse-Darmstadt
- Father: Louis IV, Grand Duke of Hesse and by Rhine
- Mother: Princess Alice of the United Kingdom
- Religion: Russian Orthodox prev. Lutheranism

Alexandra Feodorovna (Russian: Александра Фёдоровна, romanized: Aleksandra Fyodorovna; born Princess Alix of Hesse and by Rhine; 6 June 1872 – 17 July 1918) was the last empress of Russia as the consort of Nicholas II from their marriage on 26 November [O.S. 14 November] 1894 until his forced abdication on 15 March [O.S. 2 March] 1917.

Alexandra first met Nicholas in 1884, when she attended the wedding of her sister Elisabeth to Grand Duke Sergei Alexandrovich of Russia in Saint Petersburg. They continued their courtship over the following decade. In April 1894, Nicholas travelled to Coburg to attend the wedding of Alexandra's brother, Ernest Louis, Grand Duke of Hesse, to Princess Victoria Melita of Saxe-Coburg and Gotha. During the visit, he proposed to Alix. She initially declined because marriage to the Russian heir required her to convert from Lutheranism to Russian Orthodoxy, but she later accepted. They married on 26 November [O.S. 14 November] 1894.

Alexandra and Nicholas had five children: Grand Duchesses Olga, Tatiana, Maria and Anastasia, and Tsarevich Alexei. Alexei had hemophilia, and his illness influenced Alexandra's relationships with religious advisers and healers.

Alexandra’s association with Grigori Rasputin developed through the wider imperial and aristocratic circle. According to Lili Dehn, a close friend of Alexandra who later recounted her experiences in The Real Tsaritsa, Rasputin was first brought to the attention of the Grand Duchesses Milica and Anastasia of Montenegro, who were connected to the imperial family and friendly with Alexandra. Dehn wrote that the two Grand Duchesses discussed Rasputin, arousing Alexandra’s curiosity and leading her and Nicholas to express a wish to meet him. Alexandra came to believe that Rasputin could help Alexei during episodes of hemophilia, strengthening her trust in him. His relationship with the imperial family later became the subject of political criticism and public speculation.

Alexandra supported the preservation of the Russian autocracy and opposed some proposed political reforms. The extent of her political influence over Nicholas II, as well as her responsibility for decisions made by the imperial government, has remained a subject of historical debate. After Nicholas II’s abdication in March 1917, Alexandra and the imperial family were placed under house arrest and later transferred to Yekaterinburg. On 17 July 1918, Alexandra, Nicholas and their five children—Olga, 22; Tatiana, 21; Maria, 19; Anastasia, 17; and Alexei, 13—were murdered by Bolshevik forces at Ipatiev House, along with several members of their household and their dogs, Joy, Jemmy, and Ortipo.

Alexandra was reinterred with Nicholas II and three of their children in the Peter and Paul Cathedral in Saint Petersburg in 1998. The Russian Orthodox Church canonized her as a passion bearer in 2000.

== Early life ==
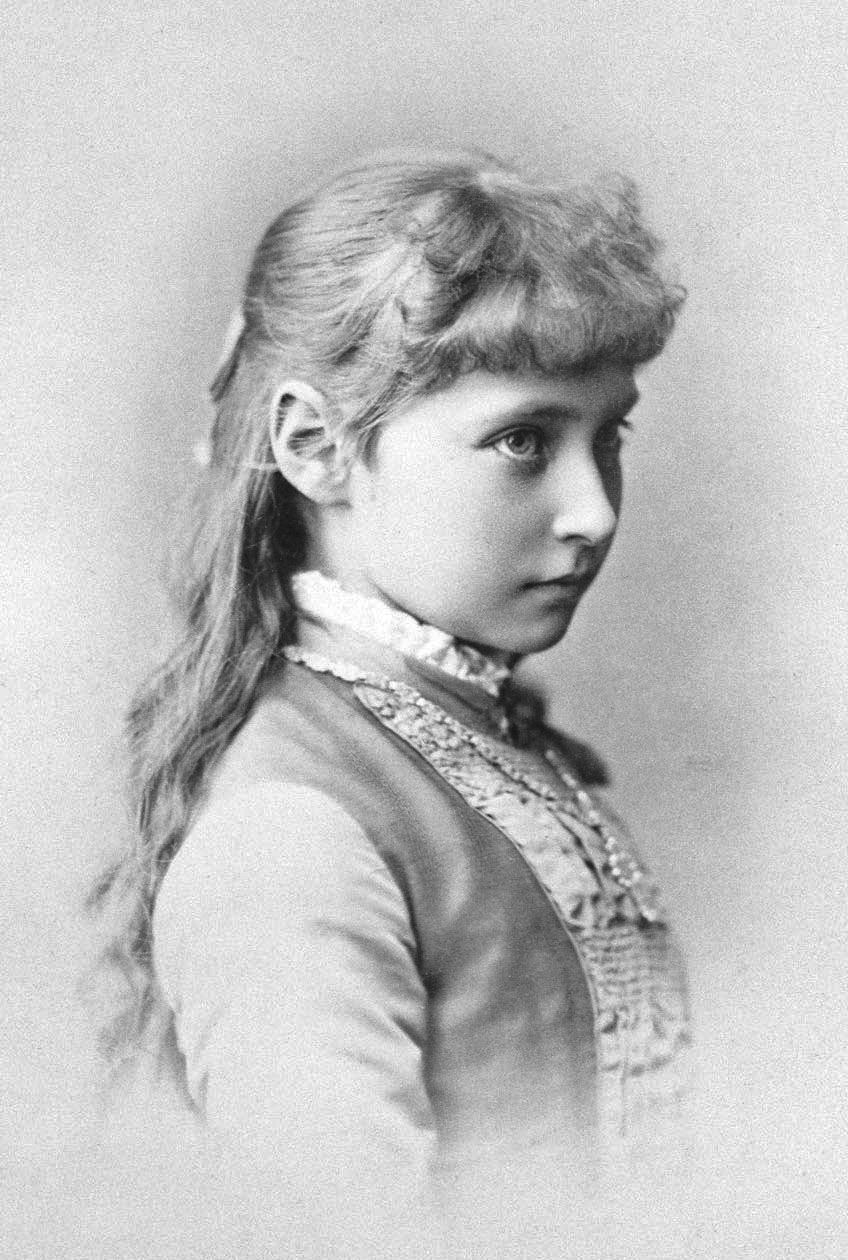
Princess Alix of Hesse and by Rhine when she was a child

Alexandra was born on 6 June 1872 at the New Palace, Darmstadt as Princess Alix Viktoria Helene Luise Beatrix of Hesse and by Rhine, a grand duchy then part of the German Empire. She was the sixth child and fourth daughter among the seven children of Louis IV, Grand Duke of Hesse, and his first wife, Princess Alice of the United Kingdom, the second daughter of Queen Victoria.

Alix was baptised on 1 July 1872 (her parents' tenth wedding anniversary) in the Protestant Lutheran Church and given the names of her mother and each of her mother's four sisters, some of which were transliterated into German. Her mother wrote to Queen Victoria, "'Alix' we gave for 'Alice' as they murder my name here: 'Ali-ice' they pronounce it, so we thought 'Alix' could not so easily be spoilt." Her mother gave her the nickname of "Sunny", due to her cheerful disposition, a name adopted later by her husband. Her British relatives nicknamed her as "Alicky", to distinguish her from her aunt-by-marriage, Alexandra, Princess of Wales, who was known within the family as Alix.

Alix's godparents were the Prince and Princess of Wales (her maternal uncle and aunt), Princess Beatrice of the United Kingdom (her maternal aunt), the Duchess of Cambridge (her great-great-aunt), the Tsesarevich and Tsesarevna of Russia (her future parents-in-law), and Princess Anna of Prussia.

Alix's older brother Prince Friedrich of Hesse and by Rhine ("Frittie") suffered from hemophilia and died in May 1873 after a fall, when Alix was about one year old. Of her siblings, Alix was closest to Princess Marie ("May"), who was two years younger; they were noted as "inseparable".

In November 1878, diphtheria swept through the House of Hesse; Alix, her three sisters, her brother Ernst ("Ernie"), and their father fell ill. Elisabeth ("Ella"), Alix's older sister, was visiting their paternal grandmother, and escaped the outbreak. Alix's mother Alice tended to the children herself, rather than abandon them to nurses and doctors. Alice fell ill and died on 14 December 1878, when Alix was six years old. This was the 17th anniversary of Alice's own father's death. Marie also died, but the rest of the siblings survived. She described her childhood before the deaths of her mother and sister as "unclouded, happy babyhood, of perpetual sunshine, then of a great cloud".

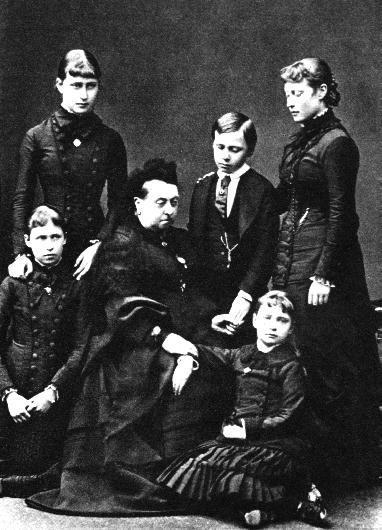
Princess Alix of Hesse, lower right, with her grandmother Queen Victoria and her four older siblings in mourning after the deaths of her mother and sister. January 1879

Queen Victoria doted on the motherless Alix and became a surrogate mother to her. She felt highly protective of Alix and declared that "while I live Alicky, til she is married, will be more than ever my own child." She handpicked Alix's tutors and instructed them to send detailed reports back to Windsor every month. She invited Alix and her surviving siblings to England for their holidays, and they grew close to their British cousins. Every birthday and Christmas, she sent Alix gifts of dresses, jewelry, lace, and dolls. Alix signed herself "your loving and grateful child," rather than grandchild, in her letters. Alix reflected that she saw Queen Victoria as "the best and dearest of grandmamas," "a very august person," "a Santa Clause," and "the dearest and kindest Woman alive." When she was betrothed to Nicholas, Alix assured Victoria that "my marrying will [not] make a difference to my love for You." When Queen Victoria died in 1901, Alix openly wept at her memorial service in Saint Petersburg and shocked the Russian courtiers who considered her cold and unfeeling.

Along with her sister, Princess Irene, Alix was a bridesmaid at the 1885 wedding of her godmother and maternal aunt, Princess Beatrice, to Prince Henry of Battenberg. At the age of 15, she attended Queen Victoria's Golden Jubilee celebrations in 1887.

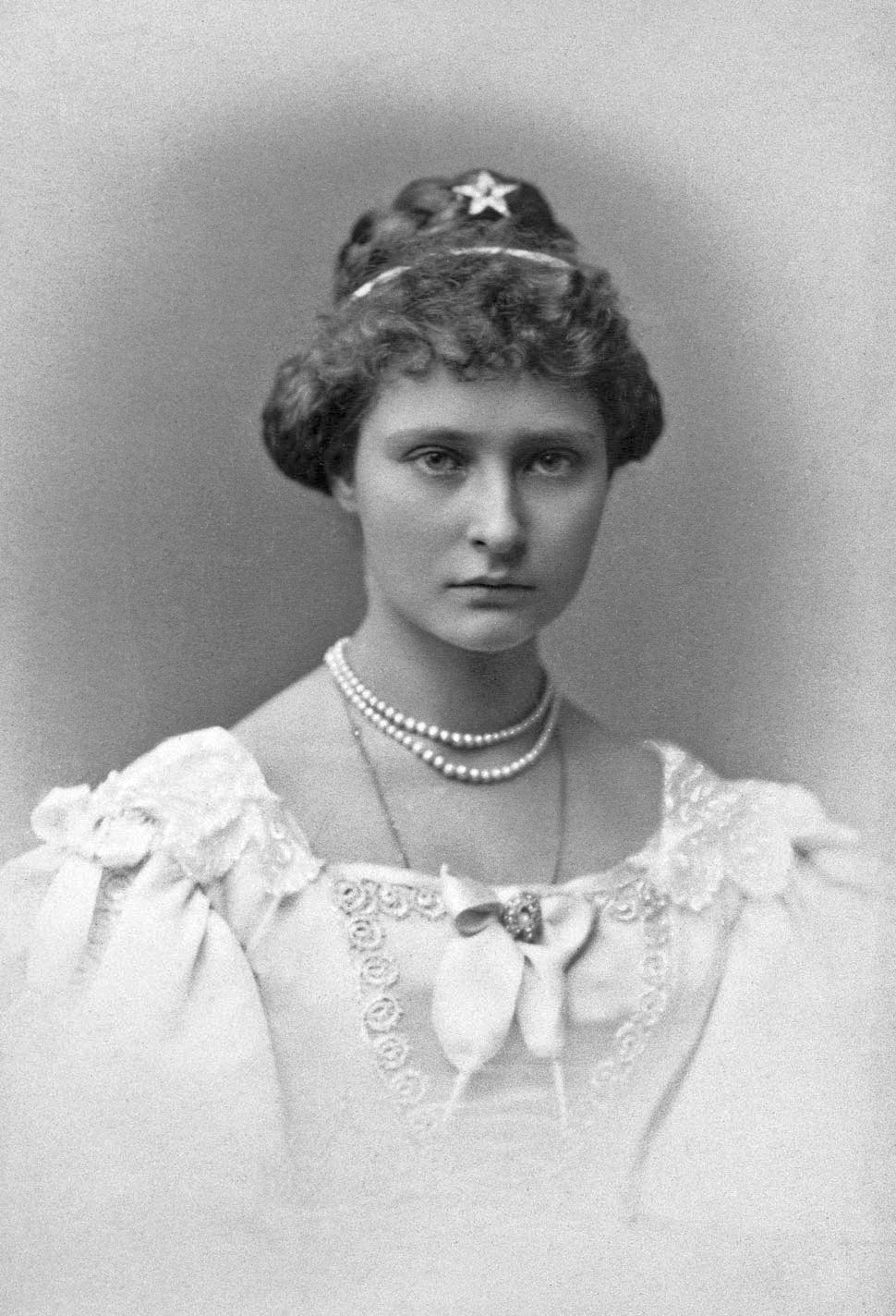
Princess Alix when she was 15

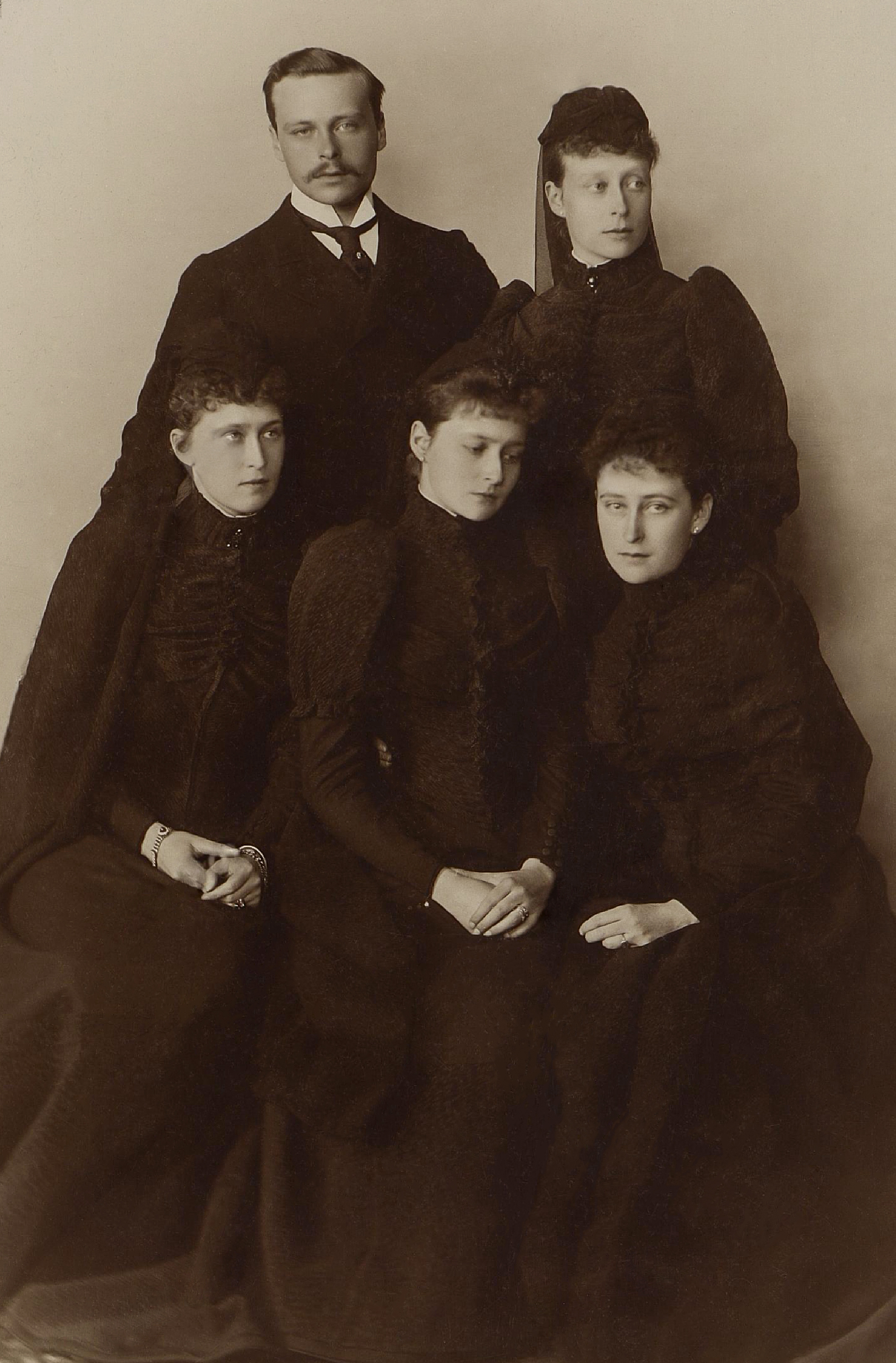
Alix of Hesse (center) with her siblings, Ernest Louis, Grand Duke of Hesse, Victoria of Hesse, Irene of Hesse, and Elisabeth Feodorovna (née Princess Elisabeth of Hesse and by Rhine), in mourning for their father's death, 1892

In March 1892, when Alix was nineteen years old, her father Grand Duke Louis IV, died of a heart attack. According to her biographer, Baroness Buxhoeveden, Alix regarded the death of her father as the greatest sorrow of her life. Buxhoeveden recalled in her 1928 biography that "for years she could not speak of him, and long after when she was in Russia, anything that reminded her of him would bring her to the verge of tears".

== Proposed matches ==
Queen Victoria greatly favored Alix and she wanted Alix to become the queen consort of the United Kingdom, which she considered "the greatest position there is." On 2 March 1888, she wrote to Alix's oldest sister Victoria that "My heart and mind are bent on securing dear Alicky for either Eddy or Georgie", respectively the second in line to the British throne and his brother, the future George V, both of whom were Alexandra's first cousins. In 1889, Victoria invited Alix and Eddy to Balmoral in hopes that they would fall in love. Eddy grew infatuated with her and proposed, but Alix was not interested in him and rejected his proposal. However, Victoria still persisted and tried to convince Alix of the benefits of the match. Victoria wrote to Princess Victoria of Hesse and by Rhine, Alix's older sister, that Alix "should be made to reflect seriously on the folly of throwing away the chance of a very good husband, kind, affectionate and steady, and of entering a united happy family and a very good position which is second to none in the world!" Alix's older sister Ella opposed the match because "he [Eddy] does not look over strong and is too stupid." In May 1890, Alix wrote a letter to Eddy that although it "pained her to pain him," she only saw him as a cousin and could not marry him. She wrote to Victoria that she would marry Eddy if she were "forced" by the family but that both of them would be miserable. Victoria was disappointed, but she decided that Alix had shown "great strength of character" in refusing to acquiesce to such strong pressure.

In 1891, Queen Victoria tried to arrange a match between Alix and Prince Maximilian of Baden. She asked Louis to invite the prince to Darmstadt as soon as possible. When he arrived in Darmstadt, Maximilian told Alix that he intended to propose to her. Alix was surprised and unhappy, and she later reflected that "I did not know him at all." She asked her older sister Victoria to intervene and help her reject Maximilian politely.

== Engagement ==
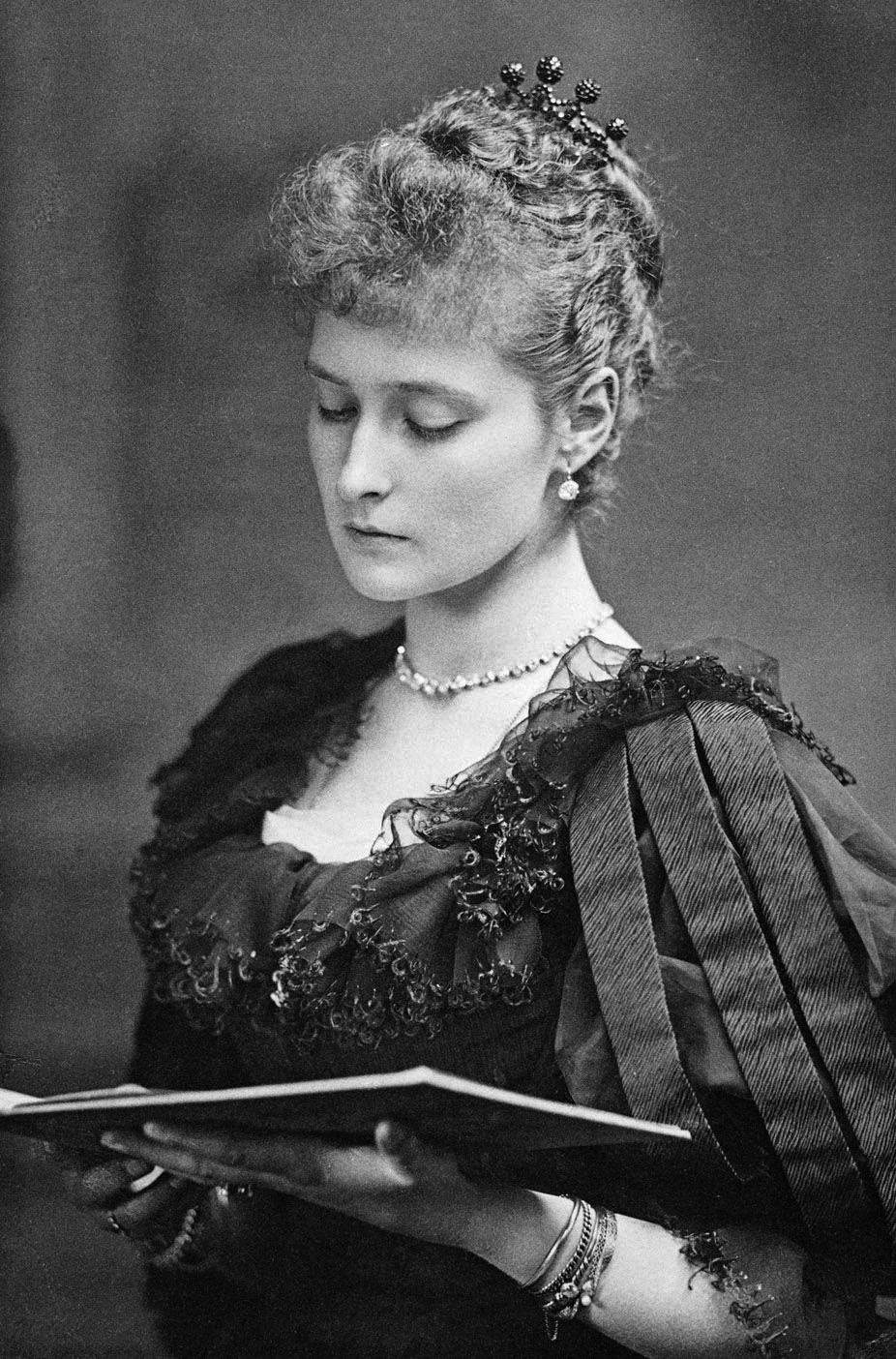
Alix of Hesse, 1890

In 1884, Alix attended the wedding of her sister Elisabeth to Grand Duke Sergei Alexandrovich in St. Petersburg. At this wedding, the 12-year-old Alix met the 16-year-old Tsesarevich Nicholas, nephew of the groom and heir-apparent to the Imperial throne of Russia. In his diary Nicholas called Alix "sweet little Alix" and declared "we love each other." He gave her a brooch as a sign of his affection, and they scratched their names into a windowpane.

In January 1890, Alix visited her sister Ella in Russia. She and Nicholas skated together, met at tea parties, and played badminton. Nicholas wrote in his diary: "It is my dream to one day marry Alix H. I have loved her for a long time, but more deeply and strongly since 1889 when she spent six weeks in Petersburg. For a long time, I have resisted my feeling that my dearest dream will come true."

Alix's sister Ella and her husband Sergei were enthusiastically in favor of the match between Nicholas and Alix. Ella and Alix's uncle, the future King Edward VII, told his mother, Queen Victoria, that "Ella will move heaven and earth to get [Alix] to marry a Grand Duke." Ella wrote to Ernest, "God grant this marriage will come true."

Nicholas and Alix were second cousins through Wilhelmina of Baden, the mother of both Nicholas's paternal grandmother, Empress Maria Alexandrovna of Russia, formerly Princess Wilhelmine Marie of Hess-Darmstadt, the first wife of Tsar Alexander II, and Alix's paternal grandfather, Prince Charles of Hesse and by Rhine, brother of Louis III, Grand Duke of Hesse and by Rhine.

Queen Victoria opposed the match to Nicholas. She personally liked Nicholas, but she disliked Russia and Nicholas's father and worried that Alix would not be safe in Russia. She wrote to Alix's older sister Victoria of her suspicions that Sergei and Ella were encouraging the match. After the betrothal was announced, she reflected: "The more I think of sweet Alicky's marriage the more unhappy I am. Not as to the personality for I like [Nicholas] very much but on account of the country and the awful insecurity to which that poor child will be exposed."

Alexander and Maria Feodorovna were both vehemently anti-German and did not want Alix as a daughter-in-law. Maria Feodorovna told her sister Alexandra of Denmark that the youngest daughter of an undistinguished grand duke was not worthy to marry the heir to the Russian throne, and she believed that Alix was too tactless and unlikeable to be a successful empress. Alexander favored Princess Hélène of Orléans, the tall, dark-haired daughter of Philippe, Comte de Paris, pretender to the throne of France. Nicholas was not attracted to Hélène, writing in his diary: "Mama made a few allusions to Hélène, daughter of the Comte de Paris. I myself want to go in one direction and it is evident that Mama wants me to choose the other one." Hélène also resisted this match, as she was Roman Catholic and her father refused to allow her to convert to Russian Orthodoxy. Alexander sent emissaries to Princess Margaret of Prussia, sister of Wilhelm II, German Emperor, and a granddaughter of Queen Victoria. Nicholas declared that he would rather become a monk than marry Margaret; she in turn was unwilling to convert to the Russian Orthodox Church from being Protestant.

When his health failed in 1894, Alexander III decided to allow Nicholas to marry Alix so that he could secure the succession. Maria reluctantly permitted Nicholas to propose to Alix. Nicholas was ecstatic and immediately inquired about Alix.

Despite her love for Nicholas, Alix was initially reluctant to marry Nicholas because she did not want to renounce her Lutheran faith to join the Orthodox Church. She wrote to Nicholas that "I cannot [convert to Orthodoxy] against my conscience" because "What happiness can come from a marriage which begins without the real blessing of God?" Nicholas was devastated, but he remained hopeful because Ella assured him that Alix was "utterly miserable" and had a "deep and pure" love for him. Nicholas begged her "not [to] say 'no' directly" and declared, "Do you think there can exist any happiness in the whole world without you!"

In April 1894 Alix's brother Ernest Louis married Princess Victoria Melita of Saxe-Coburg and Gotha. Princess Victoria was Alexander III's niece by his sister Grand Duchess Maria Alexandrovna of Russia and Nicholas's first cousin, so several Russians attended the wedding, including Grand Dukes Vladimir, Sergei and Paul, Grand Duchesses Elisabeth Feodorovna and Maria Pavlovna, and Nicholas. Nicholas was determined to persuade Alix to marry him. He was evidently confident in his future success: he brought Father Ioann Yanyshev, confessor to the Imperial family, to teach Alix about Russian Orthodoxy, and he brought Ekaterina Adolfovna Schneider to teach Alix Russian.

The day after his arrival in Coburg Nicholas proposed to Alix and tried for two hours to persuade her to convert to Orthodoxy. She wept continuously but refused. Ella spoke to Alix afterwards and she convinced Alix that she did not need to renounce Lutheranism to convert to Orthodoxy. Ella herself had not been required to abjure her Lutheran faith when she converted to Orthodoxy. The next day Alix spoke to Wilhelm II (who hoped that a German empress would lead to better German-Russian relations) and Duchess Marie of Mecklenburg-Schwerin (a German princess who had converted from Lutheranism to Orthodoxy to marry Nicholas's uncle Grand Duke Vladimir Alexandrovich of Russia). She accepted Nicholas's second proposal.

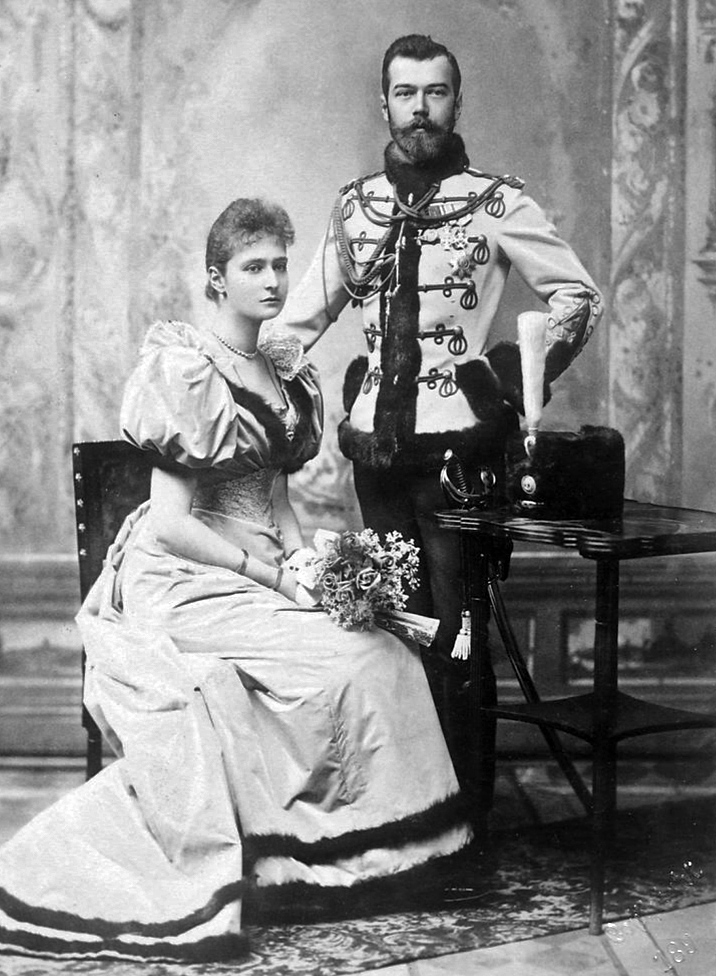
Tsar Nicholas II, in hussar uniform, and Princess Alix of Hesse in an official engagement photograph, 1894

Following the engagement Alix returned to England and her grandmother. In June Nicholas travelled to England to visit her and attend the christening of the eldest son of Prince George, Duke of York. Alix and Nicholas were both named as godparents of the boy, who reigned briefly as Edward VIII of the United Kingdom in 1936. Alix wrote to her old governess that "I am more happy than words can express. At last, after these five sad years!" Nicholas declared that "my soul was brimming with joy and life."

In September, as Alexander III's health declined, Nicholas obtained the permission of his dying father to summon Alix to the Romanovs' Livadia Palace in Crimea. Escorted by her sister Ella from Warsaw to the Crimea, she traveled by ordinary passenger train. The dying tsar insisted on receiving Alix in full dress uniform and gave her his blessing.

== Empress of Russia ==
=== Wedding ===
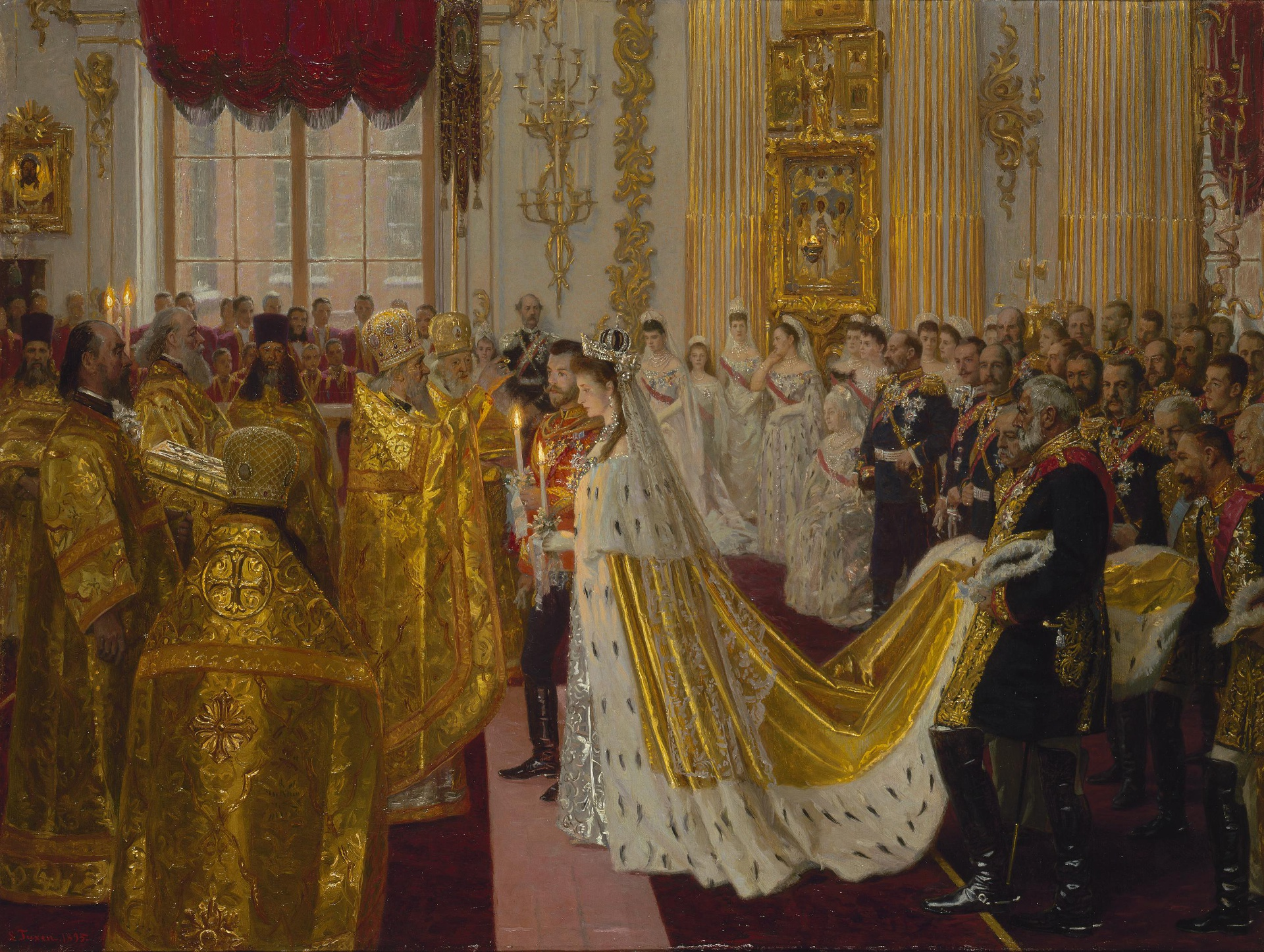
Painting by Laurits Tuxen of the wedding of Nicholas and Alexandra in the Chapel of the Winter Palace, St Petersburg, 14/26 November 1894

On 1 November 1894, Alexander III died at the age of 49. Nicholas was confirmed as Tsar Nicholas II. The next day, Alix was received into the Russian Orthodox Church as "the truly believing Grand Duchess Alexandra Feodorovna." However, she was not required to repudiate Lutheranism. Alix wanted to take the name Yekaterina, but Nicholas wanted her to take the name Alexandra so that they could be a second Nicholas and Alexandra. He was inspired by his great-grandfather Nicholas I and his great-grandmother Alexandra Feodorovna.

Alexandra, the Prince and Princess of Wales, and Nicholas's Greek relatives accompanied the coffin of Alexander III first through Moscow and St. Petersburg. The funeral of Alexander III occurred on 19 November.

On 26 November 1894, Alexandra and Nicholas married in the Grand Church of the Winter Palace of Saint Petersburg. Court mourning could be relaxed because it was the birthday of Nicholas's mother, now Dowager Empress Maria Feodorovna. Many Russians considered Alexandra a bad omen because she arrived so soon after the death of Emperor Alexander: "She has come to us behind a coffin. She brings misfortune with her." Alexandra herself wrote to her sister: "Our wedding seemed to me, a mere continuation of the funeral liturgy for the dead Tsar, with one difference; I wore a white dress instead of a black one."

=== Coronation ===
Lesser arms of Empress Alexandra Feodorovna

On 26 May 1896, Alexandra and Nicholas were crowned at the Dormition Cathedral in the Kremlin.

Five hundred thousand Russians gathered in Moscow to watch the entertainment, eat the court-sponsored food, and collect the gifts in honor of their new tsar. There were rumors that there was not enough food for everyone, so the crowd rushed towards the gift tables. The police failed to maintain order, and a thousand Russians were trampled to death at the Khodynka Field.

Nicholas and Alexandra were horrified by the deaths, and they decided not to attend the ball that the French ambassador, the Marquis de Montebello, hosted in their honor. Nicholas's uncles urged him to attend so as not to offend the French and give credence to the rumors that the German Alexandra was prejudiced against the French. Sergei Witte commented, "We expected the party would be called off. Instead it took place as if nothing had happened and the ball was opened by Their Majesties dancing a quadrille." The British ambassador informed Queen Victoria that "the Empress appeared in great distress, her eyes reddened by tears."

The next day, Alexandra and Nicholas visited the wounded and paid for the coffins of the dead. However, many Russians took the disaster at Khodynka Field as an omen that Nicholas's reign would be unhappy. Others used the circumstances of the tragedy and the behaviour of the royal establishment to underscore the heartlessness of the autocracy and the contemptible shallowness of the young tsar and his "German woman".

=== Rejection by the Russian people ===
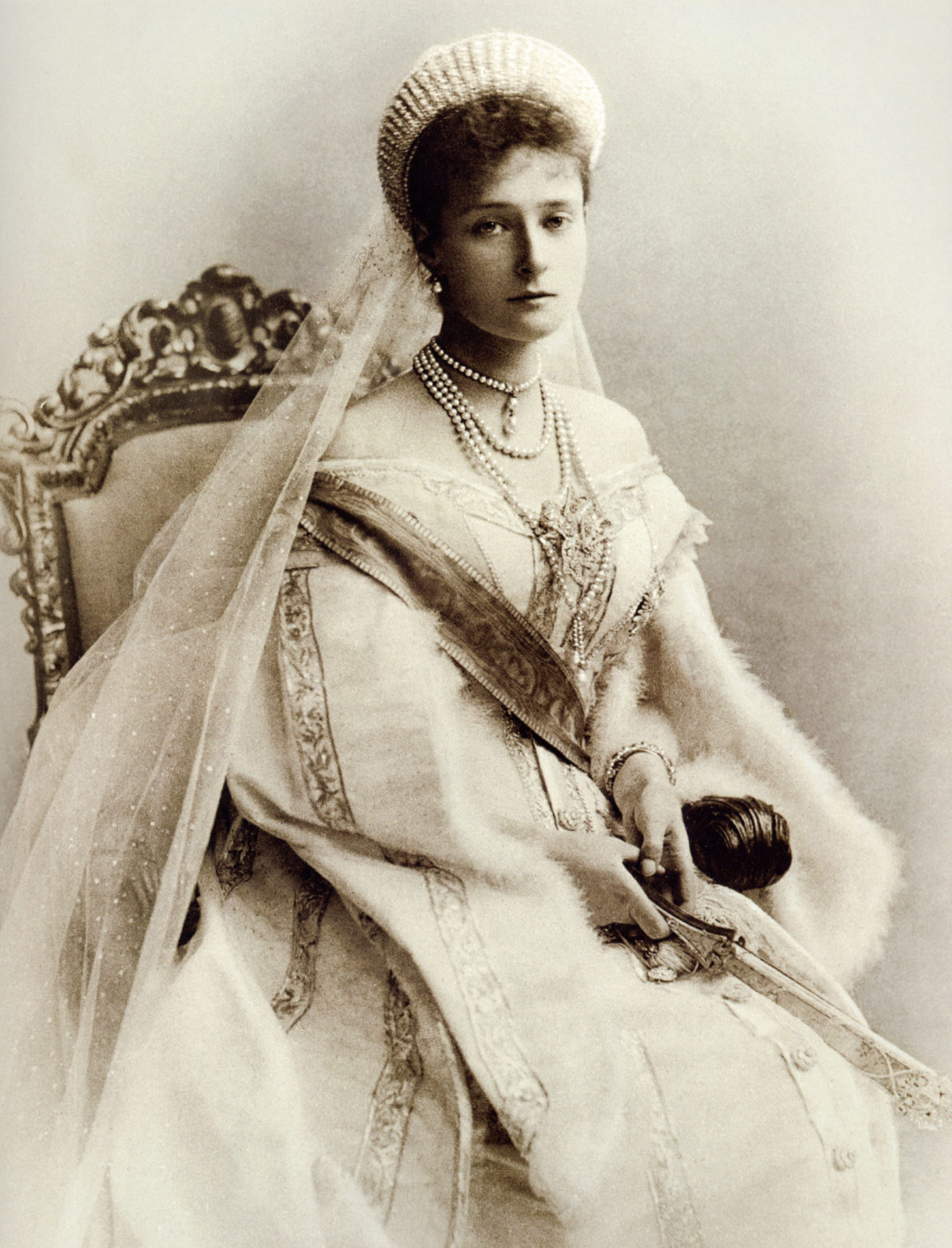
Alexandra Feodorovna, 1895

Alexandra was extremely unpopular among her husband's Russian subjects. Her shy and introverted nature was interpreted as arrogance and coldness, and she struggled to win friends. The Russian court judged her as "devoid of charm, wooden, cold eyes, holds herself as if she'd swallowed a yardstick."

Alexandra struggled to communicate. She spoke English and German fluently, but she is said to have struggled to speak French, the official language of the court. Her letters and notes show that she could read and write French very fluently however, and communication between herself and her children's French tutor Pierre Gilliard was always in French. Alexandra also spoke Italian, having learned that language as a teenager.

It is often said that she struggled with Russian and did not learn it until she became Empress. This is however untrue. Her teenage diaries show that she had some Russian lessons prior to visiting her sister Ella in Russia. She began learning Russian in earnest after her engagement to Nicholas, and during the period of her engagement wrote long passages to him in Russian - with some minor errors, but improving over time. She learned to speak Russian very well. The letters between Alexandra and her son Alexei were almost without exception in Russian.

Alexandra failed to understand her public role at court as the empress. Traditionally, the empress led the social scene and hosted numerous balls. However, Alexandra was shocked by the decadence, love affairs, and gossip that characterized parties. She declared that "the heads of the young ladies of St. Petersburg are filled with nothing but thoughts of young officers," and she crossed off the names of noblemen and noblewomen whom she deemed scandalous from the invitation lists until no one was left. Many people in St. Petersburg society dismissed Alexandra as a prude. In one of her first balls, Alexandra sent a lady-in-waiting to reprimand a young woman in a low-cut gown: "Her Majesty wants me to tell you that in Hesse-Darmstadt we don't wear our dresses this way." The unnamed woman replied, "Pray tell Her Majesty that in Russia we do wear our dresses this way." In 1896, she launched the "Help Through Handwork" project. She wanted to create a series of workshops in which noblewomen would teach poor peasants how to sew and raise funds for needy families.

Alexandra had a difficult relationship with her mother-in-law, Maria Feodorovna. Unlike other European courts of the day, Russian protocol gave the dowager empress seniority in rank to the empress. At royal balls, Maria entered on her son's arm and Alexandra followed on the arm of one of the grand dukes. Maria was so accustomed to the tradition that she was surprised when Alexandra was bitter about her junior role at court. Maria also "carried her insistence on precedence so far that the chiffres of the maids of honor of both Empresses bore the initials M. A. instead of A. M., which was the proper order." The crown jewels were the property of the current Empress, but Maria initially refused to relinquish them to Alexandra. Maria begrudgingly surrendered the magnificent collection only after Alexandra threatened not to wear any jewels at all to official court events.

Alexandra was unpopular in the imperial family. She was a fervent advocate of the 'divine right of kings' and believed that it was unnecessary to attempt to secure the approval of the people, according to her aunt, German Empress Victoria, who wrote to Queen Victoria that "Alix is very imperious and will always insist on having her own way; she will never yield one iota of power she will imagine she wields ..." She dreaded social functions and enjoyed being alone with Nicholas, so she did not host the balls and parties that a tsarina normally would. Members of the imperial family resented that she closed off their access to the tsar and the inner court. She disliked Nicholas's uncle, Grand Duke Vladimir Alexandrovich. She declared that Vladimir's sons Kirill, Boris and Andrei were irredeemably immoral. In 1913 she refused Boris's proposal for the hand of Grand Duchess Olga. During the war Vladimir's wife, Grand Duchess Marie Pavlovna, openly criticized Alexandra.

Insecure about her modest origins as a minor German princess, Alexandra insisted on being treated with the full honors due to an empress. In 1896 Alexandra and Nicholas went on a European tour. When Wilhelm II lent her an antique silver toilette service that had once belonged to his great-grandmother, Queen Louise of Prussia, she was insulted and declared that only a gold service was suitable for an empress. She dressed herself "with great magnificence". At the Russian court courtiers mocked for her "dress[ing] in the heavy brocade of which she was so fond, and with diamonds scattered all over her, in defiance of good taste and common sense."

Alexandra refused to court the public because she believed that the Russian people automatically loved and revered their emperor and empress. When she and Nicholas were traveling to Crimea by train, hundreds of peasants wore their best clothes and waited overnight to see the imperial couple. Nicholas went to the window and waved, but Alexandra refused to open the curtains and acknowledge the crowd. Dowager Empress Maria was furious that "[Alexandra] thinks the Imperial family should be 'above that sort of thing.' What does she mean? Above winning the people's affection?...And yet, how often she complains of the public indifference toward her." Queen Victoria worried about Alexandra's unpopularity in her new country and she advised her granddaughter: "I've ruled more than 50 years ... and nevertheless every day I think about what I need to do to retain and strengthen the love of my subjects ... It is your first duty to win their love and respect." Alexandra replied, "You are mistaken, my dear grandmamma; Russia is not England. Here we do not need to earn the love of the people. The Russian people revere their Tsars as divine beings ... As far as Petersburg society is concerned, that is something which one may wholly disregard." This letter, while quoted in Montefiore's book, The Romanovs, was first published in English in Orlando Figes's book A People's Tragedy. The footnotes show that the source of this letter was to be found in the Russian language book "Tsar i Tsaritsa" by Vladimir Iosifovich Gurko, who also noted "Of course, I do not vouch for the authenticity of the letters cited, but in any case they were passed around Petersburg and, of course, did not contribute to the establishment of good relations between the young Empress and the only outside world with which she came into direct contact." Following the death of Queen Victoria, all the correspondence of Empress Alexandra to Queen Victoria was returned to her. In 1917, following the Tsar's abdication, Alexandra burnt the entirety of her correspondence with Queen Victoria, and therefore the veracity of these letters cannot be confirmed as there are no extant letters between Queen Victoria and Alexandra Feodorovna in the Russian State Archives, nor is there any in the Royal Archives post 1894 other than a couple of telegrams.

=== Struggle to bear an heir ===
On 15 November 1895, Alexandra gave birth to her eldest child and daughter, Olga, at the Alexander Palace. Many Russians and members of the imperial family were disappointed in the sex of the child, but Nicholas and Alexandra were delighted with their daughter and doted on her. The birth of Olga did not change Grand Duke George's position as Nicholas's heir presumptive. The Pauline Laws implemented by Tsar Paul I forbade women from taking the Romanov throne as long as any male Romanov was alive. If Alexandra did not bear a son, Nicholas's heirs would be his brothers and uncles. However few worried because Alexandra was only 23, so she was expected to be able to bear a son soon.

A few months after giving birth to Olga, Alexandra was pregnant again. Owing to the stress of the coronation she had a miscarriage. No announcement was made, because she had not publicly confirmed her pregnancy. However, there were unfounded and malicious rumors in St Petersburg that Alexandra had become pregnant by a lover and aborted the baby to hide her infidelity.

On 10 June 1897 Alexandra gave birth to her second child and daughter, Tatiana. Nicholas was overjoyed but the members of his family were unhappy and worried. When she woke up from the chloroform, Alexandra saw the "anxious and troubled faces" around her and "burst into loud hysterics." She cried, "My God, it is again a daughter. What will the nation say, what will the nation say?" Alexandra's failure to have a son made her even more unpopular among the Russians. Nicholas's brother George said that he was disappointed not to have a nephew to relieve him of his duties as heir: "I was already preparing to go into retirement, but it was not to be.”.

On 26 June 1899 Alexandra gave birth to her third child and daughter, Maria. Queen Victoria sent Alexandra a telegram when Maria was born: "I am so thankful that dear Alicky has recovered so well, but I regret the third girl for the country." Grand Duke Konstantin fretted: "And so there's no Heir. The whole of Russia will be disappointed by this news." Russians saw the birth of a third daughter as proof that Alexandra was bad luck. Two weeks after Maria's birth, Nicholas's brother George died and their younger brother Michael became the heir presumptive to the throne. Courtiers flocked to Michael and treated him as the heir apparent, which distressed Alexandra. In October 1900 Nicholas became ill with abdominal typhus and was confined to bed for five weeks. The cabinet were forced to discuss what would happen if Nicholas died. Alexandra was pregnant with her fourth child, and she insisted that she be named regent in the hope that she would bear a son. However Nicholas's ministers refused: If Nicholas died, Michael would become tsar. If Alexandra's baby was a boy, Michael would renounce the throne in his nephew's favor. Alexandra was not satisfied and she grew to distrust Nicholas's ministers for trying to "steal" her future son's inheritance.

On 18 June 1901 Alexandra gave birth to Anastasia. Nicholas's sister, Grand Duchess Xenia, exclaimed, "My God! What a disappointment!... a fourth girl!" The French diplomat Maurice Paléologue reported: "The German [Alexandra] has the evil eye. Thanks to her nefarious influence our Emperor is doomed to catastrophe." The Russian peasants decided that "the Empress was not beloved in heaven or she would have borne a son."

Alexandra and Nicholas turned to the faith in hopes of having a son. Shortly after Anastasia's birth, Grand Duchess Militza Nikolaevna introduced Alexandra to a mystic named Philippe Nizier-Vachot. He was an unlicensed quack who claimed that he could use his magnetic powers to change the sex of a baby inside the womb. Nicholas contrived a medical diploma from the Imperial Military Medical Academy for Philippe and made him State Councilor and military doctor. Nicholas's mother (Maria), sister (Xenia) and sister-in-law (Ella) were alarmed and warned him and Alexandra to stay away from Philippe, but the imperial couple did not heed their advice.

In the end of 1901 Alexandra seemed to have become pregnant again and Philippe swore that she was carrying a boy. By the summer of 1902 it was clear that the Empress was not pregnant. Grand Duke Constantine Constantinovich of Russia wrote, "From 8 August we have been waiting every day for confirmation of the Empress's pregnancy. Now we have suddenly learned that she is not pregnant, indeed that there never was any pregnancy, and that the symptoms that led to suppose it were in fact only anaemia!". In reality, Alexandra had had a molar pregnancy. On 19 August 1902 she had suffered a discharge of "a spherical, fleshy mass the size of a walnut", which Dr Dmitry Ott confirmed was a dead fertilized egg in the fourth week of gestation. To save face, the court physicians published a bulletin on 21 August claiming that Alexandra had "a straightforward miscarriage, without any complications." Humiliated, Alexandra sent Philippe to France.

In 1903 Alexandra and Nicholas decided to support the canonisation of Seraphim of Sarov. Before he left Russia Philippe told them that Seraphim would grant Alexandra a son. Seraphim had been a monk in the Tambov region who had supposedly performed local miracles and had been dead for seventy years. The Metropolitan of Moscow reluctantly agreed to canonize the saint. On 19 August Alexandra and Nicholas bathed in the Sarov Spring in which Seraphim had once bathed and prayed that the sacred waters would bless them with a son.

In 1904 Alexandra became pregnant. There was high anticipation for a son. As her due date drew near, a newspaper noted that "a few days will decide whether the Czarina is to be the most popular woman in Russia, or regarded by the great bulk of the people as a castaway – under the special wrath of God." On 12 August 1904 Alexandra gave birth to Alexei Nikolaevich in Peterhof. Alexei's birth affirmed Nicholas and Alexandra's faith in Philippe. In her diary Nicholas's sister Olga wrote, "I am sure it was Seraphim who brought it about." Nicholas wrote to Militza to "pass on our gratitude and joy ... to Philippe."

=== Relationship with her children ===
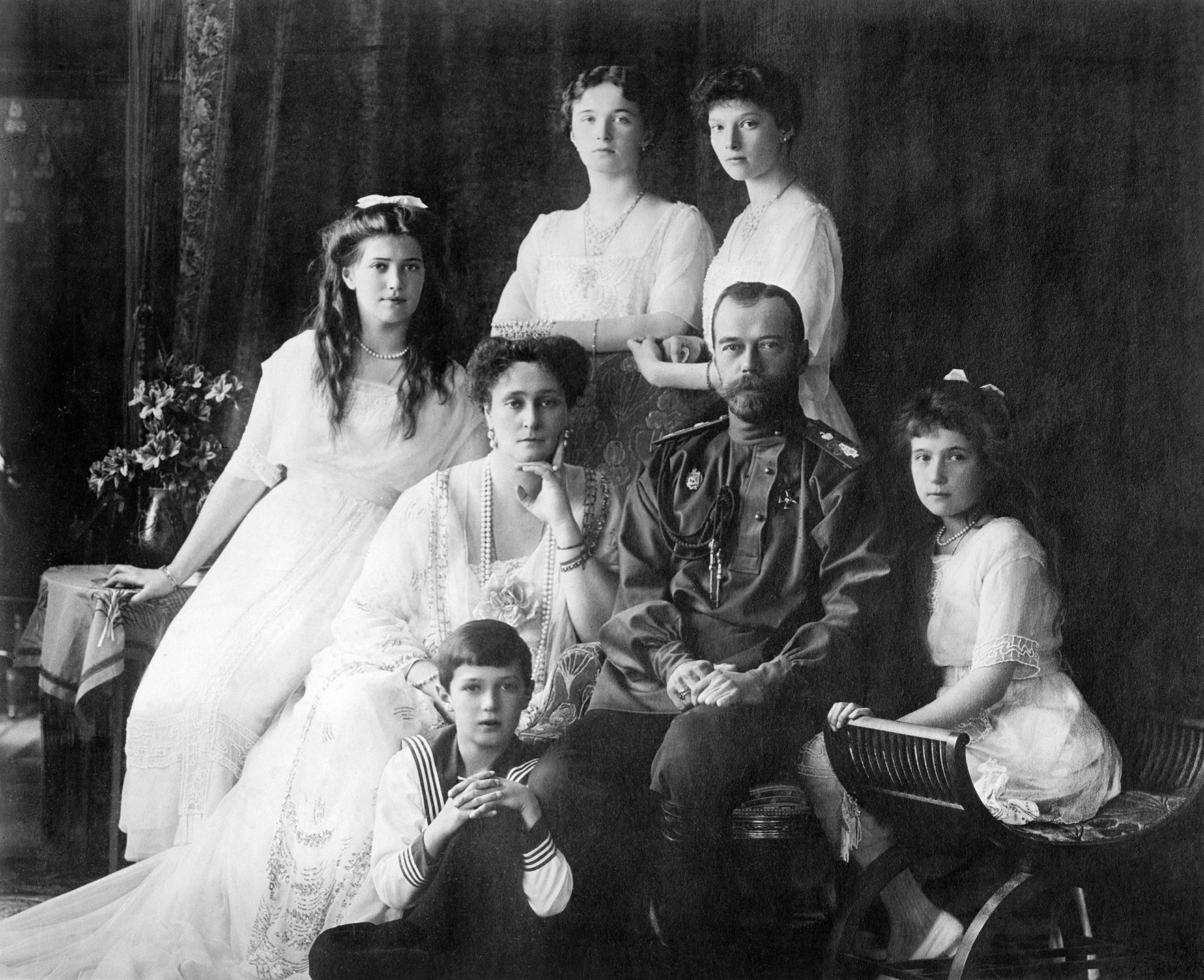
The Russian imperial family, 1913. Left to right: Grand Duchess Maria, Tsarina Alexandra, Grand Duchesses Olga and Tatiana, Tsar Nicholas, and Grand Duchess Anastasia. Tsesarevich Alexei sits in front of his parents.

Alexandra had a distant relationship with Olga. She relied on Olga to keep her younger siblings in order. Her letters to Olga include frequent reminders to mind her siblings: "Remember above all to always be a good example to the little ones" and "Try to have a serious word with Tatiana and Maria about how they should conduct themselves towards God." Olga was frustrated by trying to keep her boisterous siblings in order, and she complained that her mother had no time for her. Olga preferred her father.

The White Flower Day
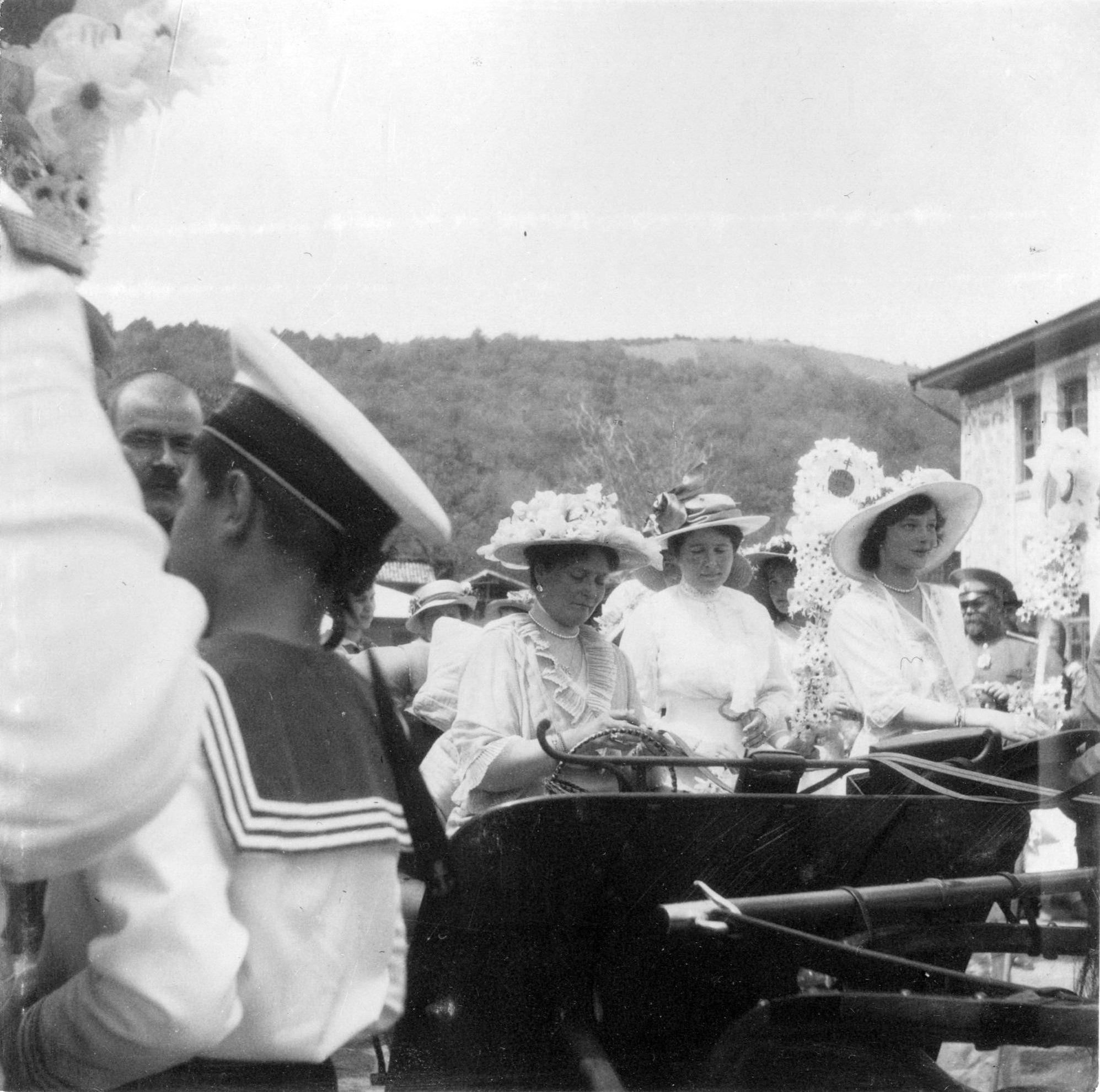
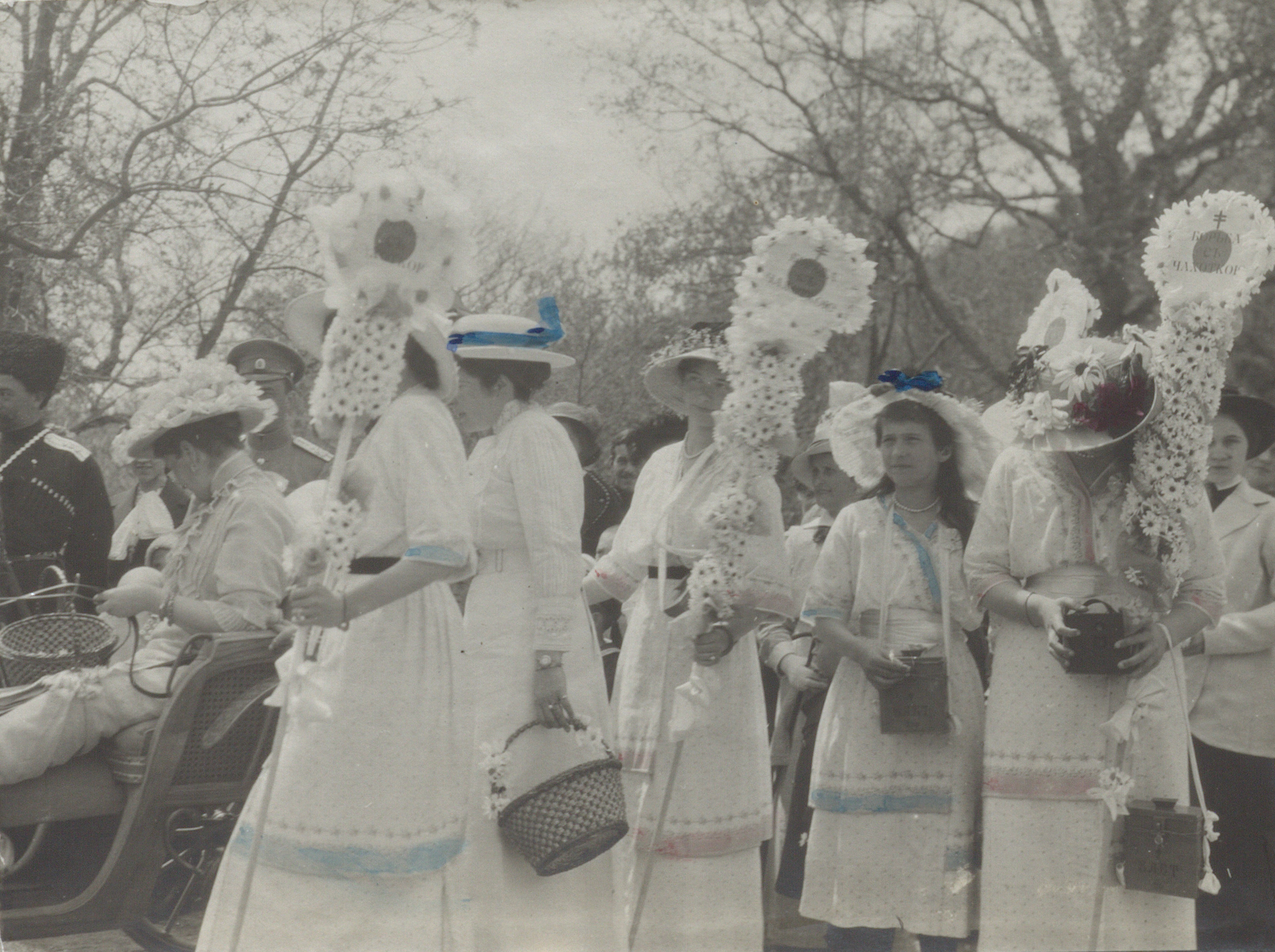
The empress Alexandra and her children during the 1914 White Flower Day charity event, selling white flowers to the people in Livadiya and Yalta in order to help people with tuberculosis. The tsarina particularly loved this ceremony that took place every spring time from 1911 to 1917.

Alexandra was closest to her second daughter, Tatiana. Tatiana resembled Alexandra the most in terms of appearance and personality. She was described by her paternal aunt Xenia: "[Tatiana] and her mother are like as two peas in a pod!.... so pretty." She was cautious and reserved, and she was unquestioningly devoted to Alexandra. During the family's final months, she helped her mother by pushing her about the house in a wheelchair.

Maria felt insecure about her role in the family, and Alexandra frequently assured Maria that she was as loved as her siblings: "Sweet child you must promise me never again to think that nobody loves you. How did such an extraordinary idea get into your little head? Get it quickly out again." Maria worried that Alexandra favored Anastasia over her, and Alexandra reassured her that "I have no secrets with Anastasia."

Anastasia physically resembled Alexandra, but her boisterous, mischievous personality was very different from her mother's. She was dubbed the shvibzik, Russian for "imp." During the family's last months, Anastasia was the only one who could make the melancholic Alexandra laugh.

Alexandra doted on Alexei because he was her only son and the heir to the Russian Empire. The children's tutor Pierre Gilliard wrote, "Alexei was the centre of a united family, the focus of all its hopes and affections. His sisters worshipped him. He was his parents' pride and joy. When he was well, the palace was transformed. Everyone and everything in it seemed bathed in sunshine." Alexandra was obsessed with trying to protect him from his disease of hemophilia. According to Gilliard, she "press[ed] the little boy to her with the convulsive movement of a mother who always seems in fear of her child's life." She sat at Alexei's bedside for days as he suffered through his attacks. She feared that he would injure himself in tantrums, so she spoiled him and never punished him.

Despite her fears of never bearing a son, Alexandra loved her daughters and called them her "little four-leaved clover". She wrote that "our girlies are our joy and happiness" and "the apostles of God".

=== Health ===
Alexandra's health was never robust and her frequent pregnancies, with four daughters in six years and her son three years after, drew from her energy. Her biographers, including Robert K. Massie, Carolly Erickson, Greg King, and Peter Kurth, attribute the semi-invalidism of her later years to nervous exhaustion from obsessive worry over the fragile tsarevich, who suffered from hemophilia. She spent most of her time in bed or reclining on a chaise in her boudoir or on a veranda. This immobility enabled her to avoid the social occasions that she found distasteful. Alexandra regularly took a herbal medicine known as adonis vernalis in order to regulate her pulse. She was constantly tired, slept badly, and complained of swollen feet. She ate little, but never lost weight (except for the last year of her life). She may have suffered from Graves disease (hyperthyroidism), a condition resulting in high levels of the thyroid hormone, which can also result in atrial fibrillation, poor heartbeat and lack of energy.

=== Hemophilia and Rasputin ===
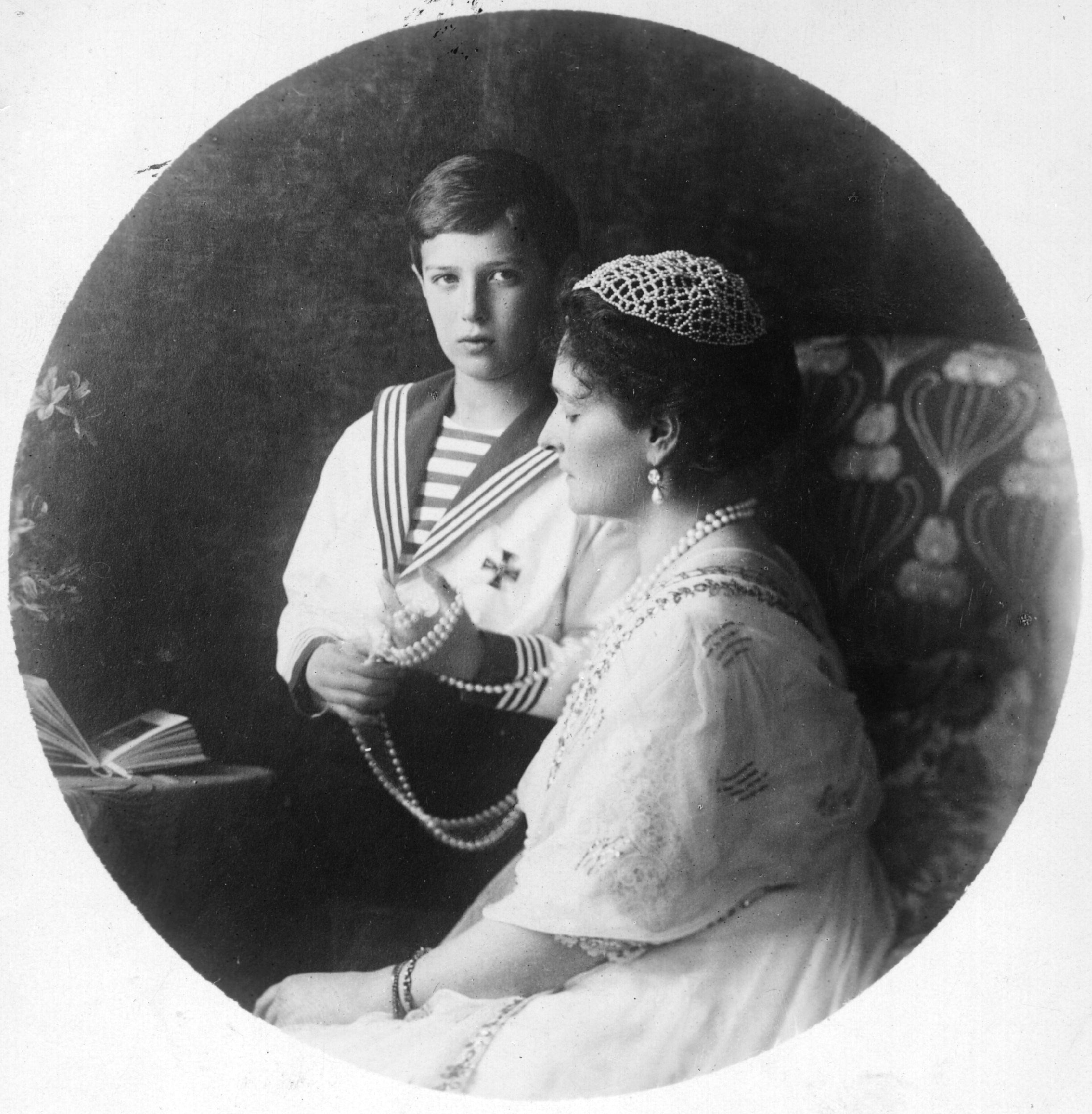
Alexandra with her son, Alexei, 1913

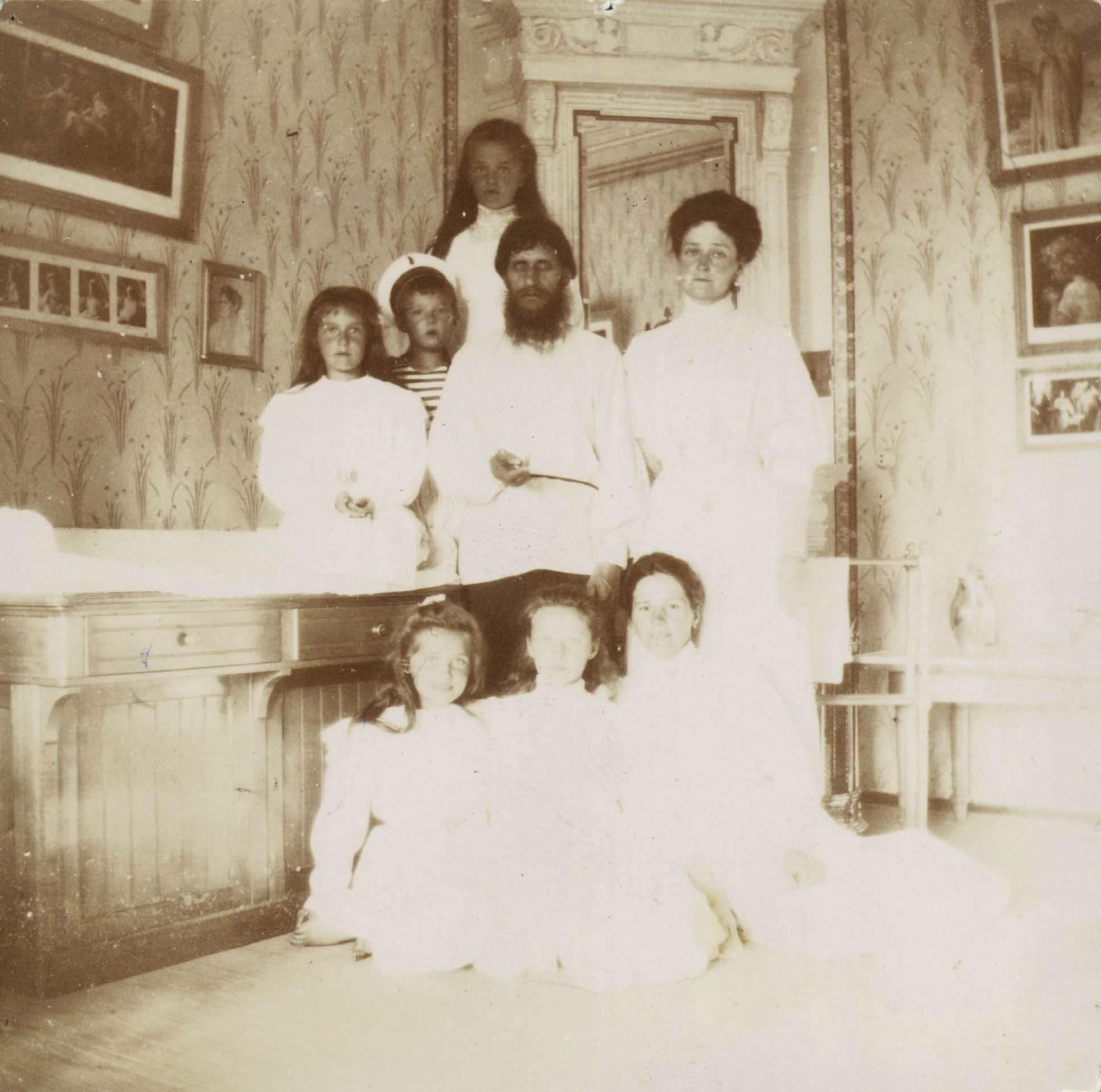
Alexandra Feodorovna with Rasputin, her children and a governess, 1908

Tsarevich Alexei Nikolaevich of Russia was heir apparent to the throne of Russia and the only son of Nicholas and Alexandra. Shortly after his birth, the court doctors realized that he had hemophilia. After his umbilical cord was cut, his stomach bled for days, and his blood did not clot. Nicholas wrote that Alexei lost "1/8 to 1/9 of the total quantity" of his blood in 48 hours. Hemophilia had entered the royal houses of Europe via the daughters of Queen Victoria, including Alexandra's mother, Princess Alice. In the early 20th century, hemophilia was often fatal, and the average life expectancy of hemophiliacs was 13. Alexandra's brother, Friedrich, and maternal uncle Prince Leopold, Duke of Albany, had died young of hemophilia. Alexandra's sister Princess Irene of Hesse and by Rhine and first cousin Princess Victoria Eugenie of Battenberg were also carriers of the hemophilia gene and had hemophiliac sons.

Alexandra felt immense guilt that she had passed down the disease to her son. Shortly after Alexei's diagnosis, she wept and told the nurse, "If only you knew how fervently I've prayed for God to protect my son from our inherited curse." Nicholas's sister Xenia called hemophilia "the terrible disease of the English family", and members of the imperial family blamed Alexandra for "contaminating the Romanovs with the diseases of her own race."

As the incurable illness threatened the sole son and heir of the emperor, the imperial family decided to keep his condition secret from the Russian people. They wanted to limit social instability because of uncertainty. At first, Alexandra turned to Russian doctors to treat Alexei. Their treatments generally failed. Burdened with the threats to her son from any fall or cut, Alexandra turned toward faith for comfort. She studied the Orthodox faith and saints and spent hours daily praying in her private chapel for deliverance.

Grigori Rasputin, a peasant from Siberia, appeared to have a cure for her son by praying for him and became powerful in court as a result. Over time, Alexandra grew to believe that Rasputin was the only man who could save her son's life. Rasputin was straightforward with Alexandra and told her, "Neither the Emperor nor you can do without me. If I am not there to protect you, you will lose your son... within six months." Alexandra blinded herself to evidence of Rasputin's debauchery and the harm his presence did to imperial prestige. The director of the national police told Alexandra that a drunk Rasputin had exposed himself at a popular Moscow restaurant and bragged that Nicholas gave him sexual access to her, but she blamed the account on malicious gossip. "Saints are always calumniated," she once wrote. "He is hated because we love him." Nicholas recognized Rasputin's faults, but he felt powerless to do anything about the man who seemingly saved his only son's life. Pierre Gilliard wrote, "He did not like to send Rasputin away, for if Alexei died, in the eyes of the mother, he would have been the murderer of his own son."

From the start, members of the court exchanged gossip about Rasputin. Although some of St Petersburg's top clergy accepted him as a living prophet, others angrily denounced him as a fraud and a heretic. Made-up stories from his life in Siberia were heard in St. Petersburg. For instance, he was said to conduct weddings for villagers in exchange for sleeping on the first night with the bride. He lived in St Petersburg with his two daughters and two housekeepers and was often visited by persons seeking his blessing, a healing, or a favour from the tsarina. Women, enchanted by the healer, also came to Rasputin for advice and individual blessings and received a private audience in his apartment, jokingly called the "Holy of Holies". Rasputin liked to preach a unique theology that one must become familiar with sin before having a chance to overcome it. No one believed that Rasputin could heal Alexei, so court officials were confused as to why Alexandra was so dependent on him.

In 1912, Alexei suffered a life-threatening haemorrhage in the thigh while the family was at Spała in Poland. Alexandra sat for days at his bedside, and she rarely ate or slept. She cried helplessly when Alexei begged for death and asked her to bury him in a forest instead of the mausoleum with his Romanov ancestors. The doctors expected Alexei to die, and a priest performed his last rites. The court officials prepared an official telegram to announce the death of the tsarevich. In desperation, Alexandra sent a telegram to Rasputin, who replied: "God has seen your tears and heard your prayers. Do not grieve. The Little One will not die. Do not allow the doctors to bother him too much." To the shock of his doctors, Alexei recovered his health and survived. From 1912, Alexandra came to rely increasingly on Rasputin and to believe in his ability to ease Alexei's suffering. It looked as if this reliance enhanced Rasputin's political power, but it is hard to detach gossip from the truth. His role in the court seriously undermined Romanov rule during the First World War.

Rasputin was assassinated to end his perceived interference in political matters on 30 December 1916. Among the conspirators were the nobleman Prince Felix Yusupov, who was married to Nicholas II's niece, Princess Irina of Russia, and Grand Duke Dmitri Pavlovich, who had once been close to Nicholas and Alexandra's family.

=== World War I ===
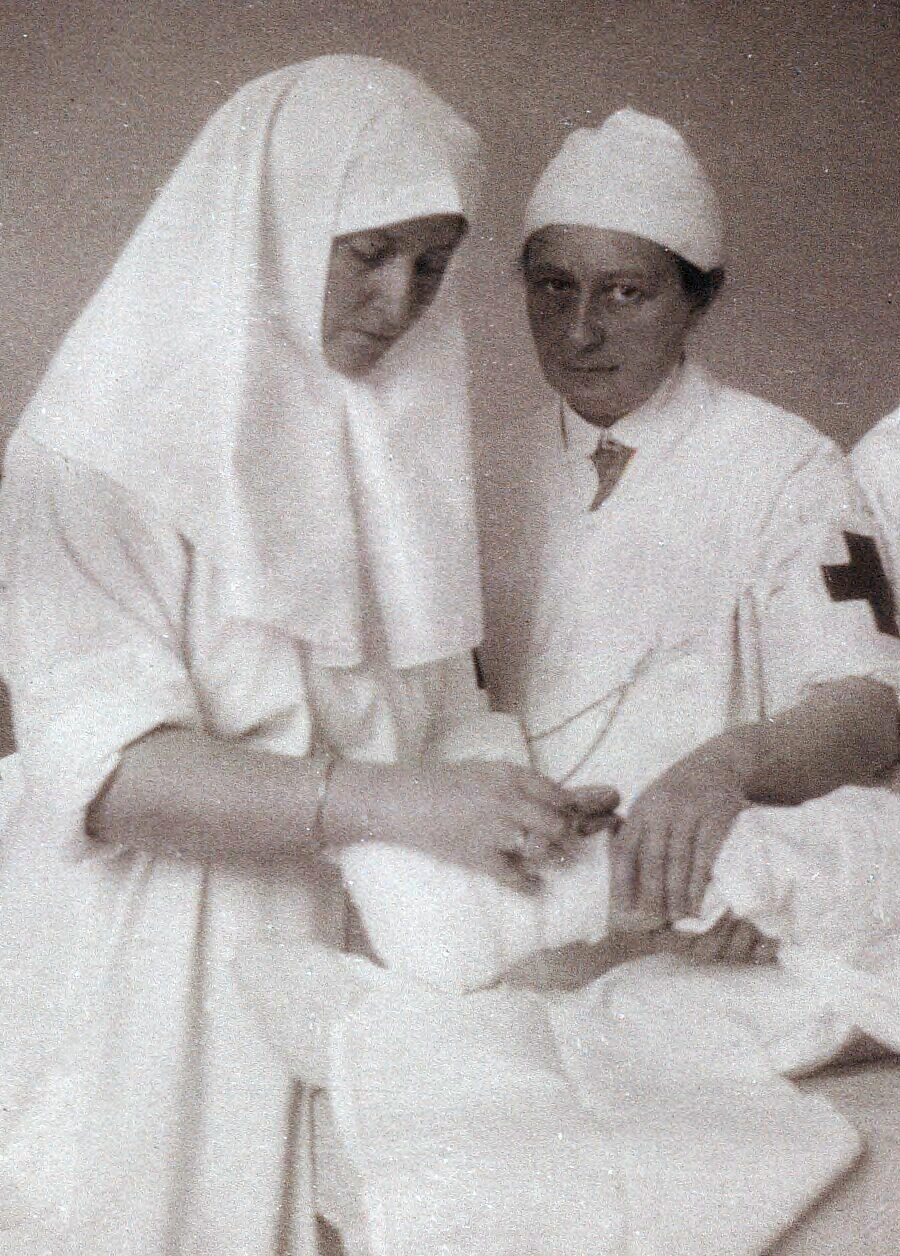
Alexandra Fyodorovna in her nursing uniform during World War I together with Vera Gedroits, 1916.

The outbreak of World War I was a pivotal moment for Russia and Alexandra. The war pitted the Russian Empire of the Romanov dynasty against the German Empire of the Hohenzollern dynasty. When Alexandra learned of the Russian mobilization, she stormed into her husband's study and said: "War! And I knew nothing of it! This is the end of everything." During the first World War, Alexandra and Nicholas exchanged around 1,700 letters.

Alexandra's ties to Germany made her more unpopular among some societies in Russia. Her brother Ernest Louis ruled the Grand Duchy of Hesse and by Rhine, so he fought with the Germans. The German Emperor, Wilhelm II, was Alexandra's first cousin. Alexandra's sister, Irene, was married to Wilhelm's brother, Henry. Ironically, Alexandra was an ardent Russian patriot and disliked the German Emperor. She privately wrote that Wilhelm II "is really nothing but a clown. He has no real worth. His only virtues are his strict morals and his conjugal fidelity."

High society in St Petersburg, renamed the Russified Petrograd, accused her of collaboration with the Germans. In Petrograd there was a rumor that Alexandra was hiding her brother Ernest in Russia. In 1916 Alexandra's lady-in-waiting wrote that she was asked "in all seriousness whether the Grand Duke of Hesse was not hidden in the cellars of the palace." Alexandra worked as a nurse to wounded soldiers but her efforts went unappreciated. There were also rumors that Alexandra and Rasputin were carrying on nightly conversations with Wilhelm II in Berlin to negotiate a dishonorable peace.

When Nicholas travelled to the front line in 1915 to take personal command of the army he left Alexandra in charge as regent in the capital. Her brother-in-law, Grand Duke Alexander Mikhailovich, recorded, "When the Emperor went to war of course his wife governed instead of him."

It looked as if Alexandra appointed and dismissed ministers based on Rasputin's self-serving advice but those close to the imperial family circle denied it. In only sixteen months she appointed three prime ministers, five ministers of the interior and three ministers of war. "After the middle of 1915," wrote Florinsky, "the fairly honorable and efficient group who formed the top of the bureaucratic pyramid degenerated into a rapidly changing succession of the appointees of Rasputin." Alexei Polivanov was an excellent official, credited with revitalizing the Imperial Russian Army, but Alexandra declared, "I don't like the choice of Minister of War Polivanov. Is he not our Friend's [Rasputin's] enemy?" The general Grand Duke Nicholas Nikolaevich disliked Rasputin because Rasputin saw and told Alexandra that the grand duke was deliberately currying favor in the army and overshadowing Nicholas so that he could claim the throne. On 16 June Alexandra wrote to the tsar, "I have absolutely no faith in N.... [he has] gone against a Man of God [Rasputin], his work can't be blessed or his advice good... Russia will not be blessed if her sovereign lets a Man of God sent to help him be persecuted, I am sure." She insisted to Nicholas that "[Rasputin] has your interest and Russia's at heart. It is not for nothing God sent him to us, only we must pay more attention to what He says. His words are not lightly spoken and the importance of having not only his prayers but his advice is great."

Ever a believer in autocracy, Alexandra persuaded Nicholas that he must never relinquish his absolute power as Emperor. She wrote to him: "You are master and sovereign of Russia. Almighty God set you in place, and they should all bow down before your wisdom and steadfastness." She advised him to "Be Peter the Great, Ivan the Terrible, Emperor Paul-- crush them all." She criticized the Duma and declared "they want to discuss things not concerning them and bring more discontent—they must be kept away.... We are not ready for constitutional government."

During the war there was great concern within the imperial house about the influence Empress Alexandra had upon state affairs through the Tsar and the influence Rasputin was believed to have upon her, since it was considered to provoke the public and endanger the safety of the imperial throne and the survival of the monarchy. On behalf of the imperial relatives of the Tsar, Grand Duchesses Elizabeth Feodorovna and Victoria Feodorovna had been selected to mediate and ask Empress Alexandra to banish Rasputin from court to protect her and the throne's reputation, the former twice, but without success. In parallel, several of the grand dukes had tried to intervene with the Tsar but with no more success.

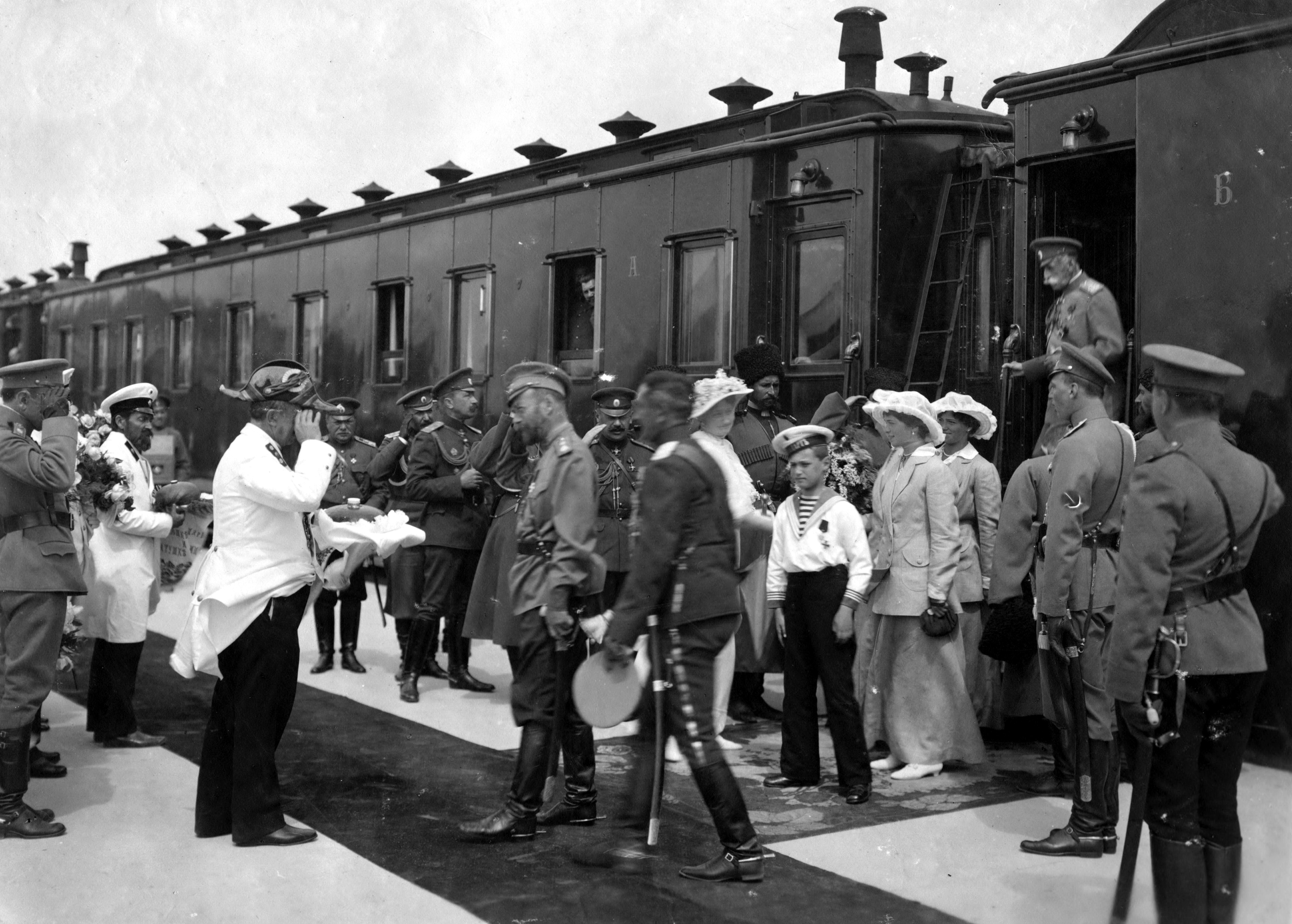
Nicholas, Alexandra and their children in Yevpatoria, Crimea, May 1916

During this conflict of 1916–1917 Grand Duchess Maria Pavlovna reportedly planned a coup d'état to depose the Tsar with the help of four regiments of the Russian Imperial Guard, which were to invade the Alexander Palace, force the tsar to abdicate and replace him with his underage son under the regency of her son Grand Duke Kirill Vladimirovich.

There are documents that support the fact that, in this critical situation, the Empress Dowager Maria Feodorovna was involved in a planned coup d'état to depose her son from the throne in order to save the monarchy. The plan was reportedly for Maria to make a final ultimatum to the Tsar to banish Rasputin unless he wished her to leave the capital, which would be the signal to unleash the coup. Exactly how she planned to replace her son is unconfirmed but two versions are available: first, that Grand Duke Paul Alexandrovich would take power in her name and that she herself would thereafter become ruling empress; the other version claims that she and Grand Duke Paul would replace the Tsar with his son, the heir to the throne, Maria's grandson Alexei, whereupon Maria and Paul would share power as regents during his minority. Reportedly, Empress Alexandra was informed about the planned coup and when Maria Feodorovna made the ultimatum to the Tsar the empress persuaded him to order his mother to leave the capital. Consequently, the dowager empress left Petrograd to live in the Mariinskyi Palace in Kiev the same year. She never again returned to the capital of Russia.

== Revolution (1917) ==
World War I put what proved to be an unbearable burden on Imperial Russia's government and economy, both of which were dangerously weak. Mass shortages and hunger became the daily situation for tens of millions of Russians owing to the disruptions of the war economy. Fifteen million men were diverted from agricultural production to fight in the war and the transport infrastructure (primarily railroads) was diverted towards war use, exacerbating food shortages in the cities since available agricultural products could not be brought to urban areas. Inflation was rampant. This, combined with the food shortages and the poor performance by the Russian military in the war, generated a great deal of anger and unrest among the people in Petrograd and other cities.

The decision of the Tsar to take personal command of the military was disastrous, since he was blamed personally for all losses. His relocation to the front, leaving the Empress in charge of the government, helped undermine the Romanov dynasty. The poor performance of the military led to rumours, believed by the people, that the German-born Empress was part of a conspiracy to help Germany win the war. Moreover, within several months of taking personal command of the army, the Tsar replaced several capable ministers with less able men at the Empress's and Rasputin's behest; most notable among these replacements was replacing N. B. Shcherbatov with Alexei Khvostov as minister of the interior. The severe winter of 1916–17 essentially doomed Imperial Russia. Food shortages worsened and famine gripped the cities. The mismanagement and failures of the war turned the soldiers against the Tsar. By 1917 the Tsar had realized that Russia could not fight the war much longer, and as railroads carried troops to the front there was little capacity left to bring food to the cities.

By March 1917 conditions had become even worse. Steelworkers went on strike on 7 March and the following day crowds hungry for bread began rioting on the streets of Petrograd to protest against food shortages and the war. After two days of rioting the Tsar ordered the army to restore order and on 11 March they fired on the crowd. That very same day the Duma, the elected legislature, urged the Tsar to take action to ameliorate the concerns of the people. The Tsar responded by dissolving the Duma.

On 12 March soldiers sent to suppress the rioting crowds mutinied and joined the rebellion, thus providing the spark to ignite the February Revolution. (Like the later October Revolution of November 1917, the Russian Revolutions of 1917 are named according to the Old-Style calendar.) Soldiers and workers set up the 'Petrograd Soviet" of 2,500 elected deputies whilst the Duma declared a Provisional Government on 13 March. Alexander Kerensky was a key player in the new regime. The Duma informed the Tsar that day that he must abdicate.

In an effort to put an end to the uprising in the capital, Nicholas tried to get to Petrograd by train from army headquarters at Mogilev. The route was blocked so he tried another way. His train was stopped at Pskov where, after receiving advice from his generals, he first abdicated the throne for himself and later, on seeking medical advice, for himself and his son, the Tsarevich Alexei.

Alexandra was now in a perilous position as the wife of the deposed Tsar, hated by the Russian people. Attempts were made by the mutinous Tsarskoye Selo garrison to storm the Alexander Palace but it was successfully defended by the palace guards. The palace guards and other troops gradually left for the capital after being informed about the abdication and Alexandra asked the Duma to put in place security measures for her and her household in view of the riots and violence in the nearby capital. On 18 March Mikhail Rodzianko sent the newly appointed Minister of War, Alexander Guchkov, and General Lavr Kornilov to Alexandra to inspect the security of the palace, which resulted in an officer being appointed to maintain the security of the palace as well as to act as a channel of communication between the palace and the Duma. After this Alexandra noticed that the guards defending the palace gradually began to wear handkerchiefs around their wrists, signalling that they supported the Duma, which also meant that she and her children, while being defended from immediate harm, were nevertheless under de facto house arrest from that moment on. Alexandra and her children and household were not molested in any way and the household was left to continue its everyday life as before, with the exception of occasional power cuts. On 21 March Kornilov informed Alexandra that she was formally under house arrest and the members of the household were informed that they were free to leave if they wished but if they chose to stay they would have to obey the same rules as pertained to the house arrest of Alexandra.

The following day, on 22 March, Nicholas was finally allowed to return to the Alexander Palace at Tsarskoe Selo, where he was placed under arrest with his family. Alexandra told him that "the husband and father was of more value in her eyes than the Emperor whose throne she had shared."

== Imprisonment (1917–1918) ==
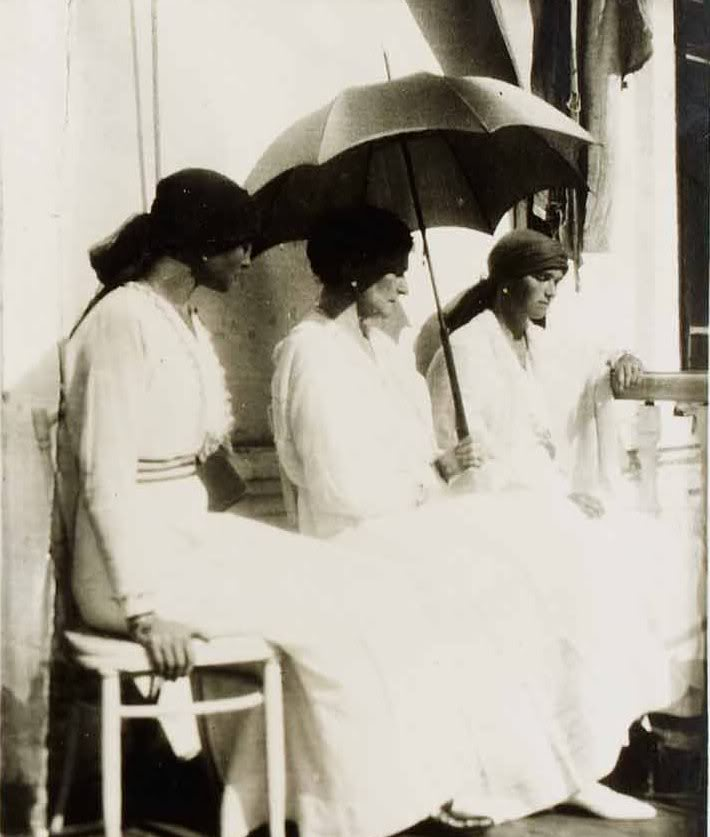
The last photograph ever taken of Alexandra. With her are her daughters Olga (right) and Tatiana (left). They are sitting on the balcony of the Governor's Mansion, Tobolsk, in Siberia in spring of 1918.

The Provisional Government formed after the revolution kept Nicholas, Alexandra and their children confined under house arrest in their home, the Alexander Palace at Tsarskoye Selo. They were visited by Alexander Kerensky from the government, who interviewed Alexandra regarding her involvement in state affairs and Rasputin's involvement in them through his influence over her. She answered that as she and her spouse kept no secrets from each other they often discussed politics and she naturally gave him advice to support him; as for Rasputin, he had been a true holy man of God and his advice had been only in the interest of the good of Russia and the imperial family. After the interview Kerensky told the Tsar that he believed that Alexandra had told him the truth and was not lying.

The Provisional Government did not wish to keep the family in Russia, particularly as both the family and the government were under threat from the Bolsheviks; they trusted that the former Tsar and his family would be received in Great Britain and ensured that inquiries were being made. Despite the fact he was a first cousin of both Nicholas and Alexandra, George V refused to allow them and their family permission to evacuate to the United Kingdom, since he was alarmed by their unpopularity in his country and the potential repercussions to his own throne. After this it was suggested they be moved to France. However, although the French government was never asked, British diplomats in France reported that the family was not likely to be welcome there, since anti-German sentiments were strong in France during the war and Alexandra was widely unpopular because she was believed to be a sympathizer of Germany. The Provisional Government was reportedly very disappointed that no foreign state seemed to be willing to receive the family and was forced to relocate them within Russia, since the security situation was becoming more and more difficult.

In August 1917 the family were moved to Tobolsk in Siberia, a step by the Kerensky government designed to remove them from the capital and possible harm. Nicholas and Alexandra had themselves suggested that they be moved to the Livadia Palace in the Crimea, but Kerensky deemed it to be too dangerous: to get to the Crimea they would have to travel through Central Russia, an area at that time affected by widespread revolutionary violence and riots where the upper classes and aristocracy were attacked by the public and their mansions burned. Tobolsk in Siberia was, in contrast to Central and Southern Russia, a calm and peaceful place with greater security and more sympathy for the former Tsar. There were indications that the Provisional Government were actually attempting to transport them out of Russia by the Trans-Siberian Railway, thus fulfilling the government's wish to have them expelled, but now via a different route, after the first attempt to exile them to Europe had failed. However this plan was not revealed to the family, and if it had indeed been the intent of the government it had to be cancelled because of a strong Bolshevik presence in Yekaterinburg and other cities along the Trans-Siberian Railway east of Tobolsk, and the family therefore continued to their official destination.

From Tobolsk Alexandra managed to send a letter to her sister-in-law, Xenia Alexandrovna, in Crimea:

My darling Xenia,

My thoughts are with you, how magically good and beautiful everything must be with you – you are the flowers. But it is indescribably painful for the kind motherland, I cannot explain. I am glad for you that you are finally with all your family as you have been apart. I would like to see Olga in all her new big happiness. Everybody is healthy, but myself, during the last 6 weeks I experience nerve pains in my face with toothache. Very tormenting ...

We live quietly, have established ourselves well [in Tobolsk] although it is far, far away from everybody, But God is merciful. He gives us strength and consolation ...

Alexandra and her family remained in Tobolsk until after the Bolshevik Revolution in November 1917. The fall of the Provisional Government and the Bolshevik's accession to power greatly worsened their position.

In 1918 they were moved to Bolshevik-controlled Yekaterinburg. Nicholas, Alexandra and their daughter Maria arrived at the Ipatiev House on 30 April 1918. On entering their new prison they were ordered to open all their luggage. Alexandra immediately objected. Nicholas tried to come to her defence saying, "So far we have had polite treatment and men who were gentlemen but now -" The former Tsar was quickly cut off. The guards informed him he was no longer at Tsarskoye Selo and that refusal to comply with their request would result in his removal from the rest of his family; a second offence would be rewarded with hard labour. Fearing for her husband's safety, Alexandra quickly gave in and allowed the search. On the window frame of what was to be her last bedroom in the Ipatiev House, Alexandra scrawled a swastika, her favourite good-luck symbol, and pencilled the date 17/30 April 1918. In May the rest of the family arrived in Yekaterinburg. They had not been able to travel earlier owing to the illness of Alexei. Alexandra was pleased to be reunited with her family once more.

Seventy-five men did guard duty at the Ipatiev House. Many of them were factory workers from the local Zlokazovsky Factory and the Verkh-Isetsk Factory. The commandant of the Ipatiev House, Alexander Avadeyev, was described as "a real Bolshevik". The majority of witnesses recall him as coarse, brutish and a heavy drinker. If a request for a favour on behalf of the family reached Avadeyev, he always gave the same response, "Let them go to hell!" The guards in the house often heard him refer to the deposed Tsar as "Nicholas the Blood-Drinker" and to Alexandra as "The German Bitch".

For the Romanovs life at the Ipatiev House was a nightmare of uncertainty and fear. The imperial family never knew if they would still be in the Ipatiev House from one day to the next or if they might be separated or killed. The privileges allowed to them were few. For an hour each afternoon they could exercise in the rear garden under the watchful eye of the guards. Alexei could still not walk and his sailor Nagorny had to carry him. Alexandra rarely joined her family in these daily activities. Instead she spent most of her time sitting in a wheelchair, reading the Bible or the works of St Seraphim. At night the Romanovs played cards or read; they received little mail from the outside world and the only newspapers they were allowed were outdated editions.

Dmitri Volkogonov and other Soviet historians believe that indirect evidence indicates that Vladimir Lenin personally ordered the execution of the imperial family, although official Soviet accounts place the responsibility for the decision with the Ural Regional Soviet. Leon Trotsky, in his diary, makes it quite clear that the execution took place on the authority of Lenin. Trotsky wrote:

My next visit to Moscow took place after the fall of Ekaterinburg. Talking to Sverdlov I asked in passing, "Oh yes, and where is the tsar?" "It's all over," he answered. "He has been shot." "And where is his family?" "And the family with him." "All of them?" I asked, apparently with a touch of surprise. "All of them," replied Sverdlov. "What about it?" He was waiting to see my reaction. I made no reply. "And who made the decision?" I asked. "We decided it here. Ilyich (Lenin) believed that we shouldn't leave The Whites a live banner to rally around, especially under the present difficult circumstances."

On 4 July 1918 Yakov Yurovsky, the chief of the Yekaterinburg Cheka, was appointed commandant of the Ipatiev House. Yurovsky was a loyal Bolshevik, a man Moscow could rely on to carry out its orders regarding the imperial family. Yurovsky quickly tightened security. From the imperial family he collected all of their jewellery and valuables. These he placed in a box which he sealed and left with the prisoners. Alexandra kept only two bracelets, which her uncle Prince Leopold, Duke of Albany had given her as a child and which she could not take off. He did not know that the former tsarina and her daughters wore concealed on their person diamonds, emeralds, rubies and ropes of pearls. These would be discovered only after the executions. Yurovsky had been given the order for the execution on 13 July.

On Sunday 14 July 1918 two priests came to the Ipatiev House to celebrate the Divine Liturgy. One of them, Father Storozhev, later recalled:

I went into the living room first, then the deacon and Yurovsky. At the same time Nicholas and Alexandra entered through the doors leading into the inner room. Two of his daughters were with him. I did not have a chance to see exactly which ones. I believe Yurovsky asked Nicholas Alexandrovich, "Well, are you all here?" Nicholas Alexandrovich answered firmly, "Yes, all of us." Ahead beyond the archway, Alexandra Feodorovna was already in place with two daughters and Alexei Nicolaievich. He was sitting in a wheelchair and wore a jacket, as it seemed to me, with a sailor's collar. He was pale, but not so much as at the time of my first service. In general he looked more healthy. Alexandra Feodorovna also had a healthier appearance. ...According to the liturgy of the service it is customary at a certain point to read the prayer, "Who Resteth with the Saints." On this occasion for some reason the deacon, instead of reading the prayer began to sing it, and I as well, somewhat embarrassed by this departure from the ritual. But we had scarcely begun to sing when I heard the members of the Romanov family, standing behind me, fall on their knees ...

== Captivity and murder ==
Tuesday 16 July 1918 passed normally for the former imperial family. At four o'clock in the afternoon, Nicholas and his daughters took their usual walk in the small garden. Early in the evening, Yurovsky sent away the fifteen-year-old kitchen boy, Leonid Sednev, saying that his uncle wished to see him. At 7 pm, Yurovsky summoned all the Cheka men into his room and ordered them to collect all the revolvers from the outside guards. With twelve heavy military revolvers lying before him on the table he said, "Tonight, we shoot the entire family, everybody." Upstairs Nicholas and Alexandra passed the evening playing bezique; at ten thirty they went to bed.

The former tsar, tsarina and all of their family, including the gravely ill Alexei, along with several family servants, were killed by firing squad and bayonets in the basement of the Ipatiev House, where they had been imprisoned, early in the morning of 17 July 1918, by a detachment of Bolsheviks led by Yakov Yurovsky. In the basement room of the Ipatiev House, Alexandra complained that there were no chairs for them to sit on, whereupon Nicholas asked for and received three chairs from the guards. Minutes later, at about 2:15 am, a squad of soldiers, each armed with a revolver, entered the room. Their leader Yurovsky ordered the entire party to stand; Alexandra complied "with a flash of anger" and Yurovsky then casually pronounced, "Your relations have tried to save you. They have failed and we must now shoot you." Nicholas rose from his chair and had time to utter only "What...?" before he was shot several times, not (as is usually said) in the head but in the chest; his skull bears no bullet wounds but his ribs were shattered by at least three fatal bullet wounds. Standing about six feet from the gunmen and facing them, Alexandra watched the killing of her husband and two manservants before military commissar Peter Ermakov took aim at her. She instinctively turned away from him and began to make the sign of the cross, but before she could finish the gesture Ermakov killed her with a single gunshot which, as she had partly turned away, entered her head just above the left ear and exited at the same spot above her right ear. After all the victims had been killed, Ermakov in a drunken haze stabbed Alexandra's body and that of her husband, shattering both their rib cages and chipping some of Alexandra's vertebrae.

=== Identification of remains ===
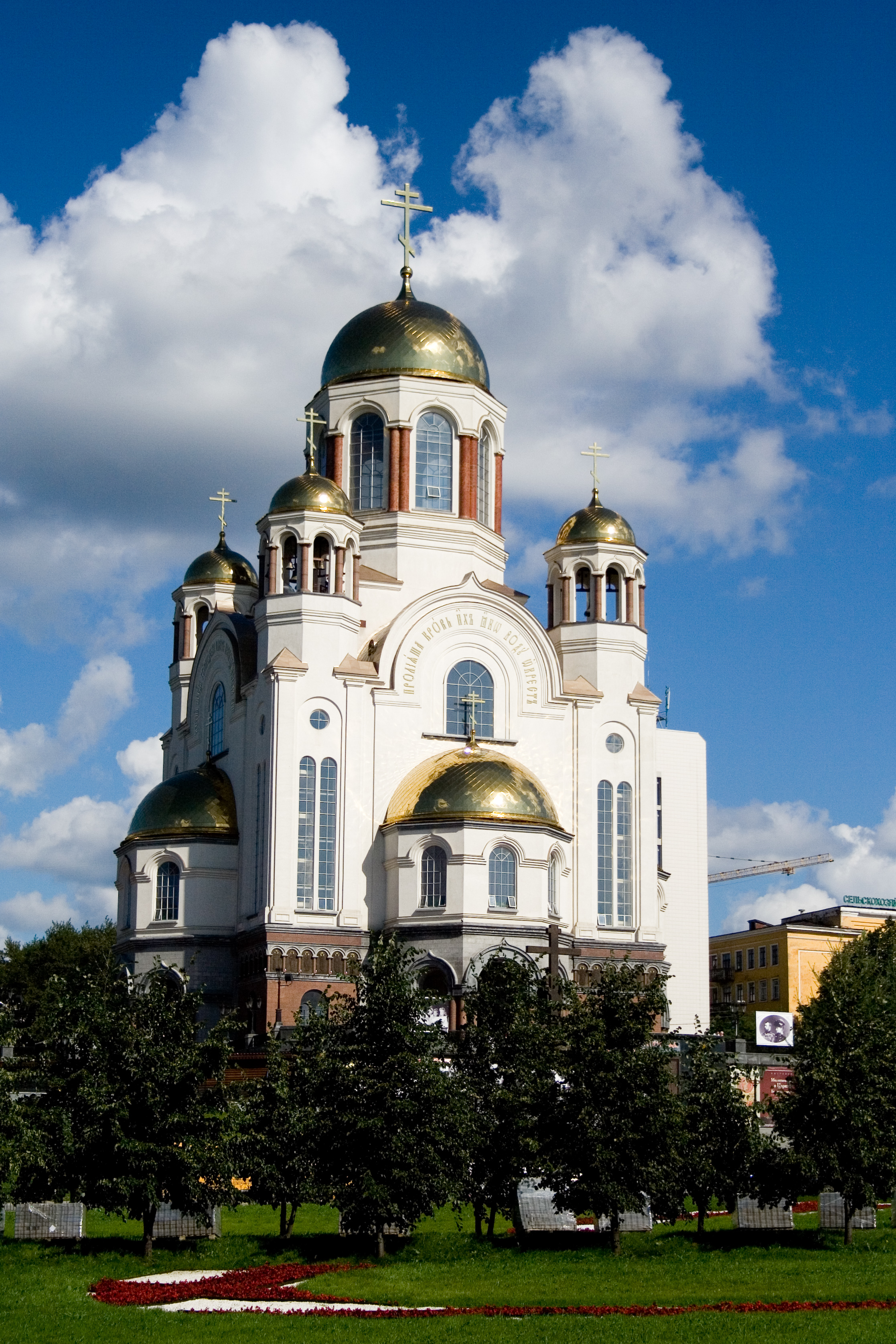
Yekaterinburg's "Church on the Blood", built on the spot where the Ipatiev House once stood

After the murder of the Romanov family in the Ipatiev House, Alexandra's body, along with those of Nicholas, their children and some faithful retainers who died with them, was stripped and the clothing burnt according to the Yurovsky Note, a secret report by Yurovsky, which came to light in the late 1970s but did not become public knowledge until the 1990s. Initially the bodies were thrown down a disused mine-shaft at Ganina Yama, 12 miles (19 km) north of Yekaterinburg. A short time later the bodies were retrieved. Their faces were smashed and the bodies, dismembered and disfigured with sulphuric acid, were hurriedly buried under railway sleepers with the exception of two of the children, whose bodies were not discovered until 2007. The Yurovsky Note helped the authorities to locate the bodies. The missing bodies were those of a daughter—Maria or Anastasia—and Alexei. In the early 1990s, following the fall of the Soviet Union, the bodies of the majority of the Romanovs were located along with their loyal servants, exhumed and formally identified. Preliminary results of genetic analysis carried out on the remains of a boy and a young woman believed to belong to Nicholas II's son and heir Alexei and daughter Anastasia or Maria were revealed on 22 January 2008. The Ekaterinburg region's chief forensic expert said, "Tests conducted in Yekaterinburg and Moscow allowed DNA to be extracted from the bones, which proved positive," Nikolai Nevolin said. "Once the genetic analysis has been completed in Russia, its results will be compared with test results from foreign experts." Nevolin said the final results would be published in April or May 2008. Certainty about the remains definitively put an end to the claim that Anna Anderson could be connected with the Romanovs, since all remaining bodies would be accounted for.

DNA analysis represented a key means of identifying the bodies. A blood sample from Prince Philip, Duke of Edinburgh (a grandson of Alexandra's oldest sister, Princess Victoria of Hesse and by Rhine), was used to identify Alexandra and her daughters through their mitochondrial DNA. They belonged to Haplogroup H (mtDNA). Nicholas was identified using DNA obtained from, among others, his late brother Grand Duke George Alexandrovich of Russia. Grand Duke George had died of tuberculosis in the late 1890s and was buried in the Peter and Paul Fortress in St Petersburg.

=== Burial ===
Alexandra, Nicholas and three daughters plus the servants who were killed with them were reinterred in the St Catherine Chapel of the Peter and Paul Cathedral at the Peter and Paul Fortress in Saint Petersburg in 1998, with much ceremony, on the eightieth anniversary of the execution.

== Personality and appearance ==
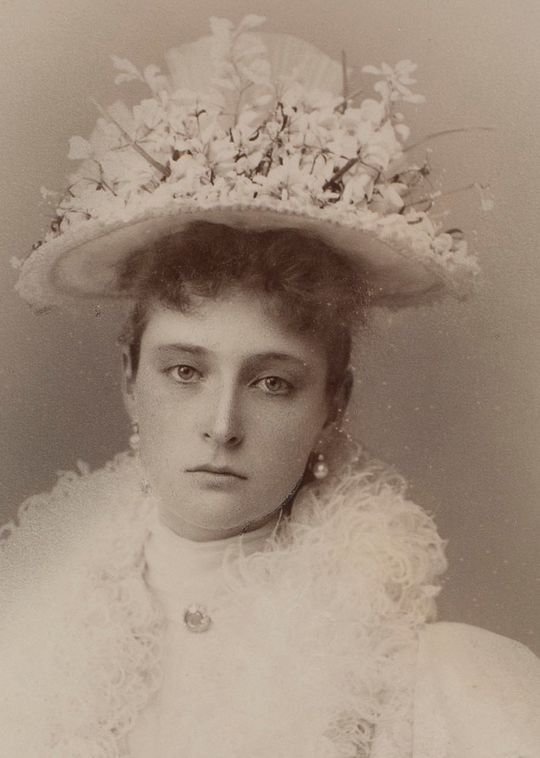
Alexandra, 1890

Alexandra had dark hair, which was highly esteemed as beautiful by several contemporary authors, but the exact color of her hair is uncertain. She was variously described as having "reddish-brown", "brown-gold" or "dark auburn" hair, by various authors. She had a sallow (yellowish) skin tone in her youth, and a tall nose.

An imperial courtier spoke favorably about her "dark blue eyes" and "wonderful hair", while noting that there was something "cold, even repellent" about her appearance.

In 1905, her daughters' tutor Pierre Gilliard wrote that "the Tsarina was still a beautiful woman at that time. She was tall and slender and carried herself superbly. But all this ceased the moment one looked into her eyes—those speaking, grey-blue eyes which mirrored the emotions of a sensitive soul."

Alexandra was shy. When her grandmother Queen Victoria insisted that she play the piano for others, she felt that her "clammy hands... [were] literally glued to the keys" and later described the experience as "one of the worst ordeals" of her life. When she was empress, a page in the imperial household described her as "so obviously nervous of conversation" and claimed that "at moments when she needed to show some social graces or a charming smile, her face would become suffused with little red spots and she would look intensely serious." Grand Duke Konstantin Konstantinovich of Russia noted that she "is terribly shy... It's noticeable that she does not have her mother-in-law's charm, and still does not, therefore, inspire general adulation." Nadine Wonar-Larsky, her lady-in-waiting, noted that she was "extremely shy even at such an informal affair as receiving" Wonlar-Larsky and her mother to tea. An imperial courtier noted that "when she was conversing or grew tired, her face became covered in red blotches [and] her hands were red and fleshy." She herself admitted that during social functions, she "long[ed] to disappear into the ground." She told her friend Marie Bariatinsky that "I am not made to shine before an assembly—I have not got the easy nor the witty talk one needs for that." This was often mistaken as haughtiness. Her brother Ernest Louis reflected that "she would unsmilingly tilt her head to one side if something displeased her, with the result that people often thought that she was unhappy, or bored, or simply capricious." Her daughters' tutor Pierre Gilliard reflected that "the reserve which so many people had taken as an affront and had made her so many enemies was rather the effect of a natural timidity, as it were—a mask covering her sensitiveness."

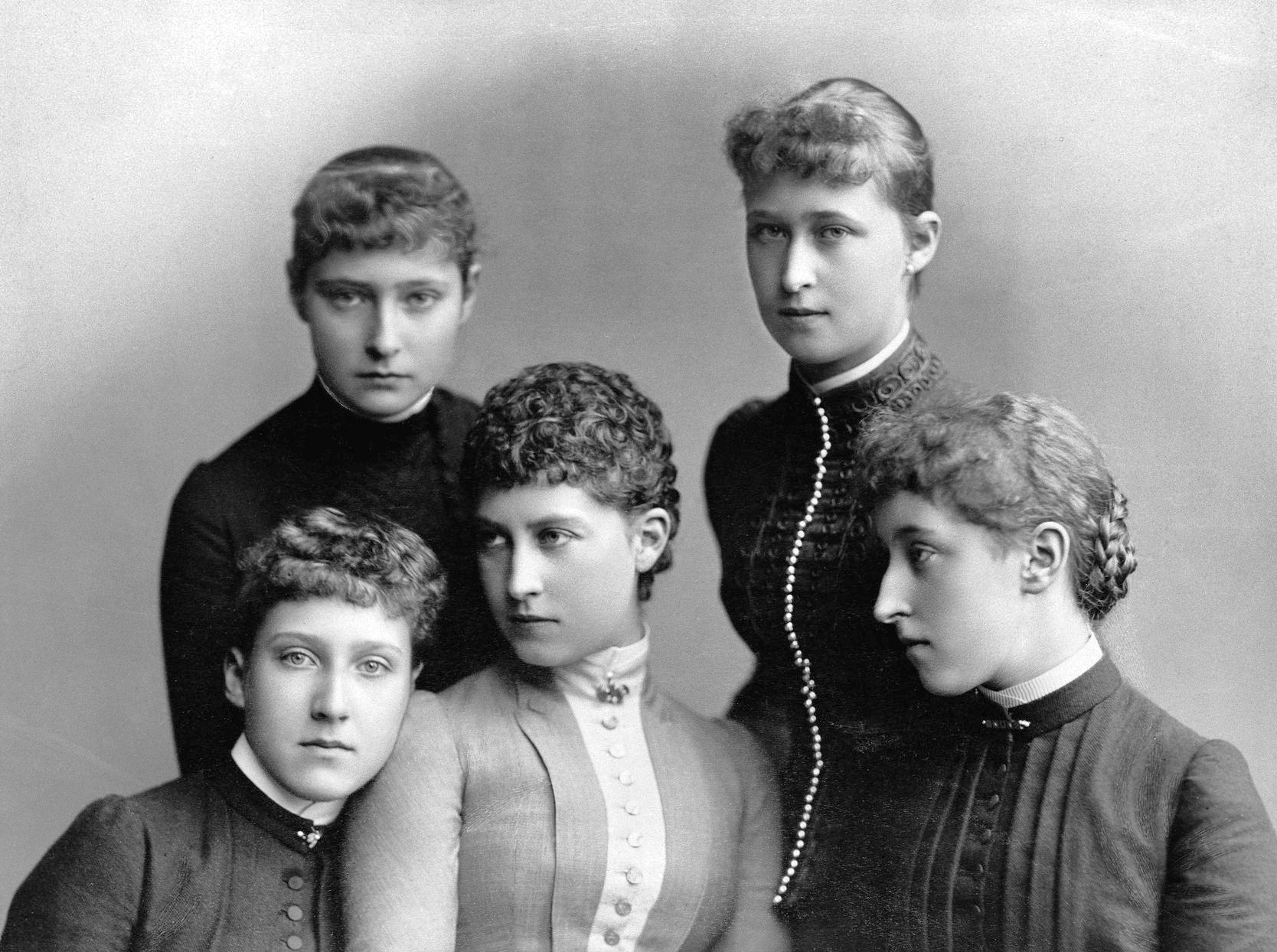
Left to right (back row): Princess Alix of Hesse; Princess Irene of Hesse; (front row): Princess Marie Louise of Schleswig-Holstein; Charlotte, Princess Bernhard of Saxe-Meiningen; Princess Helena Victoria of Schleswig-Holstein.

Even from a young age, Alexandra was serious and melancholic. Her first cousin and childhood friend Princess Marie Louise said that she had "a curious atmosphere of fatality." Princess Marie Louise allegedly asked her, "Alix, you always play at being sorrowful; one day the Almighty will send you some real crushing sorrows, and then what are you going to do?" Sir George William Buchanan, who was a diplomat for Alexandra's grandmother Queen Victoria, reflected that Alexandra had a "sad and pathetic expression."

Alexandra was devoutly religious. Although she loved Nicholas, she initially refused his proposal because she refused to convert from Lutheranism and join the Russian Orthodox Church, as was expected of all wives of Russian emperors. She told Nicholas that even though "it grieves me terribly and makes me very unhappy" not to marry him, leaving the Lutheran church would be "a wrongful thing." Generous to her friends, she would try to help others: her lady-in-waiting Sophie Buxhoeveden wrote that she was "ready to do literally anything for her friends" and that "she would take up things and people with violent enthusiasm." Alexandra admitted that "I am of the preacher type. I want to help others in life, to help them to fight their battles and bear their crosses.". Such feelings give a clue to her friendship with the plain, naïve Anna Vyrubova whom she consoled after a brief and disastrous marriage.

Princess Alice had encouraged in her children the importance of and potential learning from literature and Alexandra grew up well-read in English and German. In her first years as empress, she translated Russian writings and studied Russian music to improve her command of the language. She read Leo Tolstoy's novels and discussed them with her husband.

Alexandra enjoyed music. When she was young, she played the banjo and sang duets for hours with Queen Victoria's lady-in-waiting Minnie Cochrane. She enjoyed playing the piano with her daughter Olga, who inherited her musical talent.

== Sainthood ==
Saint Alexandra Romanova of Russia

Tsaritsa, Passion-Bearer or Martyr
- Venerated in: Eastern Orthodox Church
- Canonized: 1981 by Russian Orthodox Church Abroad; 2000 by the Russian Orthodox Church
- Major shrine: Church on Blood, Yekaterinburg, Russia
- Feast: 17 July

In 1981 Alexandra and her immediate family were recognised as martyrs by the Russian Orthodox Church Outside Russia. In 2000 Alexandra was canonized as a saint and passion bearer by the Russian Orthodox Church, together with her husband, their children and others including her sister Grand Duchess Elisabeth Feodorovna and the Grand Duchess's fellow nun Varvara.

== In popular culture ==
- The best-selling 1895 American novel The Princess Aline by Richard Harding Davis was based on his infatuation with Alexandra.
- Rasputin and the Empress (1932), a fictionalized film less famous than the lawsuit it spawned. Alexandra was portrayed by Ethel Barrymore.
- The highly fictionalized 1966 film Rasputin, the Mad Monk, in which Renée Asherson portrayed the Empress.
- A rather romanticised version of Alexandra's life was dramatized in the 1971 movie Nicholas and Alexandra, based on the book by the same title written by Robert Massie, in which the tsaritsa/Empress was played by Janet Suzman.
- The song "Rasputin" is a 1978 Euro-disco hit single by the Germany-based group Boney M. It tells of Alexandra's alleged affair with Rasputin.
- 1974's Fall of Eagles, a BBC series dramatizing the demise of the ruling families of Germany, Austria-Hungary and Russia. Alexandra, portrayed by American actress Gayle Hunnicutt, is a prominent character in the series.
- In Edward the Seventh, a 1975 television series dramatising the life of King Edward VII, Tsarina Alexandra is portrayed by actress Meriel Brooke in episodes 10 and 13.
- Rasputin: Dark Servant of Destiny is a 1996 HBO TV film for which Greta Scacchi won an Emmy for her portrayal of Empress Alexandra.
- Rasputin: The Mad Monk (1997), a biographical documentary.
- Anastasia (1997), an American animated musical fantasy drama film produced by 20th Century Fox, where Empress Alexandra appears in flashbacks.
- The Romanovs: An Imperial Family (2000), a Russian film that explores the last year of the Imperial family after Nicholas's abdication, the house arrest of the family and eventual execution. Lynda Bellingham plays Empress Alexandra.
- The Lost Prince, a BBC mini-series made in 2003 about Prince John of the United Kingdom, the youngest son of King George V, in which Alexandra is played by Lithuanian actress Ingeborga Dapkūnaitė.
- The episode "Love and Revolution" devoted to the fall of the Romanov dynasty is featured in the Danish television A Royal Family, a series about the descendants of King Christian IX of Denmark.
- Alexandra Feodorovna is a main character in the stage play Ekaterinburg by David Logan.
- The 2019 Netflix docudrama The Last Czars explores the reign, and eventual demise, of Tsar Nicholas II. Alexandra was portrayed by Susanna Herbert.
- The 2021 spy film The King's Man (which took creative liberties with historical facts) featured Serbian actress Branka Katić as Empress Alexandra.
- The execution of the Romanov family is depicted in Season 5, Episode 6 of Netflix docudrama The Crown, which is titled "Ipatiev House."

== Honours ==
=== National decorations ===
- Grand Duchy of Hesse: Dame of the Grand Ducal Hessian Order of the Golden Lion, 28 March 1888
- Russian Empire: Dame Grand Cross of the Imperial Order of Saint Catherine, April 1894

=== Foreign decorations ===
- Sovereign Military Order of Malta: Bailiff Grand Cross of Honour and Devotion
- Empire of Japan: Dame Grand Cordon of the Order of the Precious Crown, 7 March 1896
- Kingdom of Portugal: Dame of the Order of Queen Saint Isabel, 9 April 1896
- Kingdom of Prussia: Dame of the Order of Louise, 1st Division, 5 September 1896
- Ottoman Empire: Dame Grand Cordon of the Order of the Chefakat, 1 July 1902
- Spain: Dame of the Royal Order of Noble Ladies of Queen Maria Luisa, 23 April 1896
- United Kingdom:
  - Queen Victoria Golden Jubilee Medal, 1887
  - Member of the Royal Order of Victoria and Albert, 1st Class, 1896
- Persian Empire: Member of the Imperial Order of the Sun for Ladies, 1st Class, 1900

== Archives ==
Alexandra Feodorovna's letters to Anna Vyrubova and Lili Dehn, written in the years 1916–1918, are preserved in the 'Romanov collection' in the Beinecke Rare Book and Manuscript Library, Yale University (New Haven, Connecticut, USA).

Documents about Alexandra and her family (including photographs and correspondence) can also be found in the Archive of the House of Hesse, which is kept in Fasanerie Palace in Eichenzell, Germany.

Alexandra Feodorovna (Alix of Hesse) House of Hesse-Darmstadt Cadet branch of the House of Hesse Born: 6 June 1872 Died: 17 July 1918
Russian royalty
Vacant Title last held by Maria Feodorovna (Dagmar of Denmark)	Empress consort of Russia; 26 November 1894 – 15 March 1917	Empire abolished in 1917
