= Wedding of Nicholas II and Alexandra Feodorovna =

1894 royal wedding

Wedding of Nicholas II of Russia and Princess Alix of Hesse and by Rhine
- Engagement photograph of Nicholas and Alexandra
- Date: 26 November 1894; 131 years ago
- Location: Grand Church of the Winter Palace, St Petersburg
- Participants: Nicholas II of Russia; Grand Duchess Alexandra Feodorovna (Alix of Hesse)

The wedding of Nicholas II of Russia to Alexandra Feodorovna (Alix of Hesse) occurred on 26 November [O.S. 14 November] 1894 at the Grand Church of the Winter Palace.

== Engagement ==
On 19 April 1894, Tsarevich Nicholas was at the wedding of Ernest Louis, Grand Duke of Hesse, to their mutual cousin, Victoria Melita of Saxe-Coburg and Gotha. Nicholas had also obtained permission from his parents, Tsar Alexander III and Empress Maria Feodorovna, to propose to Ernst's younger sister, Princess Alix of Hesse and by Rhine, one of the favorite granddaughters of Queen Victoria. The Emperor and Empress had initially been opposed to the match. However, Nicholas, who had first met Alix a decade earlier in St. Petersburg when Alix's sister, Princess Elisabeth of Hesse and by Rhine, married Nicholas's uncle, Grand Duke Sergei Alexandrovich, was not to be dissuaded. Furthermore, Tsar Alexander's health was beginning to fail.

Shortly after arriving in Coburg, Nicholas proposed to Alix. However, Alix, who was a devout Lutheran, rejected Nicholas's proposal, as in order to marry the heir to the throne, she would have to convert to Russian Orthodoxy. Nonetheless, Alix's cousin, Kaiser Wilhelm II, who had been at the wedding along with their grandmother, Queen Victoria, came to speak to her, insisting that it was her duty to marry Nicholas, despite her religious scruples. Elizabeth also spoke with her, insisting that there were not that many differences between Lutheranism and Orthodoxy. At the prompting of the kaiser, Nicholas proposed for the second time, and she accepted.

On 1 November 1894, Alexander III died at Maley Palace, Livadia, aged forty-nine, leaving twenty-six-year-old Nicholas as tsar of Russia. The following day, Alix, who had arrived at Livadia several days earlier in order to receive the dying tsar's blessing, was received into the Russian Orthodox Church as Grand Duchess Alexandra Feodorovna. Alix had apparently expressed her wish to take the name Catherine, but decided to take the name Alexandra on Nicholas's request.

On 18 November, after nearly two weeks of Orthodox liturgies, and a procession from Crimea to St. Petersburg, via Moscow, Nicholas's father was interred at the Peter and Paul Fortress.

== Marriage ==
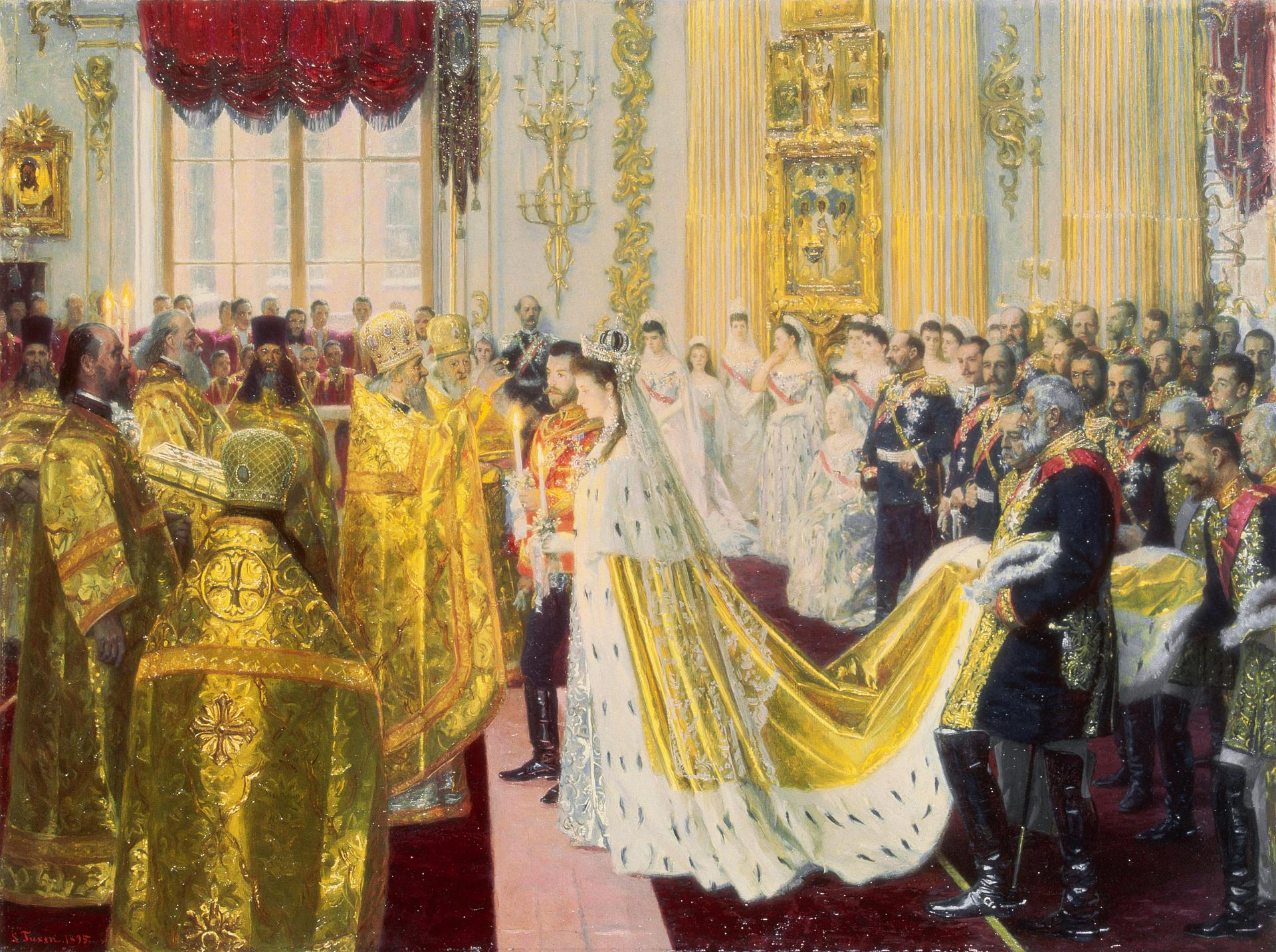
Wedding ceremony of Nicholas & Alexandra

Plans for the wedding, which had been set for the spring of 1895, had been in the works since Nicholas's engagement, and it ordinarily would have included a week of public celebrations and parades. However, the death of Alexander III put an end to such extravagant plans. Nicholas had initially expressed his wish to be married at Livadia before his father's funeral, which Nicholas's mother had agreed with. However, his uncles, Grand Dukes Vladimir, Alexei, Sergei and Paul argued that, as Nicholas was tsar, the wedding should be held in St. Petersburg with some pomp. With Nicholas unwilling to wait until the end of official mourning to marry, it was decided to hold the wedding on his mother's birthday, which would have allowed for court mourning to be somewhat relaxed. Nicholas had also intended to keep the wedding a private family affair, but his uncles had persuaded their nephew to invite the diplomatic corps to watch the procession to and from the cathedral.

Invitations had been sent out, along with a dress code: Russian gentlemen were to wear full regimental dress, bureaucrats were to wear the appropriate uniforms as stipulated in Peter the Great's Great Table of Ranks; Russian ladies were to come in full court dress, foreign women in evening dresses, with full jewels and awards.

At 11:30 am, on the morning of the wedding, Nicholas departed the Anichkov Palace in an open landau to the Winter Palace, in the company of his sixteen-year-old brother, Grand Duke Michael. Soon after, Nicholas's mother departed in a closed coach for the Sergeivsky Palace, the St. Petersburg residence of Grand Duke Sergei and Grand Duchess Elizabeth, to bring Alexandra to the Winter Palace.

At the Winter Palace, Alexandra was dressed in her wedding dress and imperial mantle. Her Honiton lace veil had been designed by her maternal grandfather Prince Albert and had been worn at the weddings of her mother, Princess Alice (who died in 1878 when Alexandra was six), and her sisters. She also wore the traditional Romanov Imperial Nuptial Crown, a 475 carat necklace and matching earrings that had belonged to Catherine the Great. Across her body, she wore the star and sash of the Order of St. Andrei.

At 12:10, the procession into the Great Church began, with canons of the Peter and Paul Fortress announcing the beginning of the ceremonies. Marie Feodorovna led the procession, accompanying her daughter-in-law to be, with Nicholas walking behind them in his Hussar's uniform, complete with his medals and the orange sash of the Order of Hesse und Bei Rhein. Along with the Romanov Grand Dukes and Duchess, foreign royal relatives processed into the church, headed up by Nicholas's maternal grandfather, King Christian IX of Denmark. Other relatives included King George I and Queen Olga of Greece (uncle and aunt of Nicholas), and their son, George, the Prince and Princess of Wales (uncle and aunt to both Nicholas and Alexandra), and their eldest surviving son, George, the Duke of York, the Duke and Duchess of Saxe-Coburg-Gotha (uncle and aunt of both Nicholas and Alexandra). Alexandra's brother, Ernest Louis, had come from Germany, as had one of her sisters, Princess Irene, and her husband, Prince Heinrich of Prussia.

The service was presided over by the Archpriest Ioann Yanyshev, the private imperial confessor and chief of the Palace clergy, along with other clergymen. After Nicholas mounted the dais, Marie Feodorovna led Alexandra to the dais, and the priest brought rings on a tray. After blessing them, Yanyshev announced the betrothal of Nicholas to Alexandra to the congregation, and then handed them their rings. After exchanging them three times, Nicholas and Alexandra knelt and exchanged formal wedding vows, with Nicholas's best men, Grand Dukes Michael, Cyril Vladimirovich, Sergei Mikhailovich and Prince George of Greece holding the nuptial crowns above their heads. Following being led around the lectern, they knelt and kissed a gold cross, and following a final prayer, Nicholas and Alexandra were pronounced man and wife, at which point the church bells across St. Petersburg rang and guns were fired from the Peter and Paul Fortress.

Due to court mourning, there was no reception, nor honeymoon, with Nicholas and Alexandra going to reside with his mother and brother at the Anichkov Palace. In time, however, Nicholas and Alexandra would move to the Alexander Palace at Tsarskoye Selo. Their "lifelong passion" began at their wedding, despite the mourning of Nicholas's father, which changed the tone and nature of the celebration.

After her wedding on 10 December 1894, Alexandra wrote a letter to her sister saying, "Here we get out but little, as Nicky sees people almost all day and then has to read through his papers and to write. Only tea we have together, all the other meals upstairs with the rest. I cannot yet realize that I am married, living here with the others, it seems like being on a visit". However, she goes on to say, "For my Nicky's sake I must be good, so as to cheer him up. If I only could find words to tell you of my happiness daily it grows more and my love greater. Never can I thank God enough for having given me such a treasure. He is too good, dear, loving and kind, and his affection for his mother is touching, and how he looks after her, so quietly and tenderly".

Similar sentiments of appreciation and devotion can be continually observed in both Nicholas and Alexandra's letters for the remainder of their lives, long after the wedding. In fact, historian Robert Service, author of The Last of the Tsars : Nicholas II and the Russian Revolution, writes that "Nicky and Alix had been united by a profound, romantic, and unwavering love".

== Guests ==
=== The groom's family ===
- (Russian Empire) The Empress Dowager of Russia, the groom's mother
  - (Russian Empire) Grand Duchess Xenia Alexandrovna and Grand Duke Alexander Mikhailovich of Russia, the groom's sister and her husband (also the groom's first cousin once removed)
  - (Russian Empire) Grand Duke Michael Alexandrovich of Russia, the groom's brother
  - (Russian Empire) Grand Duchess Olga Alexandrovna of Russia, the groom's sister
- (Russian Empire) Grand Duke Vladimir Alexandrovich and Grand Duchess Marie Pavlovna of Russia, the groom's paternal uncle and aunt
  - (Russian Empire) Grand Duke Cyril Vladimirovich of Russia, the groom's first cousin
  - (Russian Empire) Grand Duke Boris Vladimirovich of Russia, the groom's first cousin
  - (Russian Empire) Grand Duke Andrei Vladimirovich of Russia, the groom's first cousin
  - (Russian Empire) Grand Duchess Elena Vladimirovna of Russia, the groom's first cousin
- (Russian Empire) Grand Duke Alexei Alexandrovich of Russia, the groom's paternal uncle
- (Russian Empire) Grand Duke Paul Alexandrovich of Russia, the groom's paternal uncle
- (Russian Empire) Grand Duchess Alexandra Iosifovna of Russia, the groom's paternal grandaunt by marriage
  - (Russian Empire) Grand Duke Konstantin Konstantinovich and Grand Duchess Elizabeth Mavrikievna of Russia, the groom's first cousin once removed and his wife
  - (Russian Empire) Grand Duke Dmitri Konstantinovich of Russia, the groom's first cousin once removed
  - (Kingdom of Württemberg) Duchess Vera of Württemberg, the groom's first cousin once removed (representing the King of Württemberg)
- (Russian Empire) Grand Duke Michael Nikolaevich of Russia, the groom's paternal granduncle
  - (Russian Empire) Grand Duke Nicholas Mikhailovich of Russia, the groom's first cousin once removed
  - (Russian Empire) Grand Duke George Mikhailovich of Russia, the groom's first cousin once removed
  - (Russian Empire) Grand Duke Sergei Mikhailovich of Russia, the groom's first cousin once removed
- The King of Denmark, the groom's maternal grandfather
  - (Kingdom of Greece) The King and Queen of the Hellenes, the groom's maternal uncle and aunt (also the groom's first cousin once removed)
    - (Kingdom of Greece) Prince George of Greece and Denmark, the groom's first cousin
  - Prince Valdemar of Denmark, the groom's maternal uncle

=== The bride's family ===
- The Grand Duke of Hesse and by Rhine, the bride's brother
- (Kingdom of Prussia) Princess and Prince Henry of Prussia, the bride's sister and brother-in-law (also the bride's first cousin) (representing the German Emperor)
- (Russian Empire) Grand Duchess Elisabeth Feodorovna and Grand Duke Sergei Alexandrovich of Russia, the bride's sister and brother-in-law (also the groom's aunt and uncle)
- The Prince and Princess of Wales, the bride and groom's mutual uncle and aunt (representing the Queen of the United Kingdom)
  - (United Kingdom) The Duke of York, the bride and groom's mutual first cousin
- The Duke and Duchess of Saxe-Coburg and Gotha, the bride and groom's mutual uncle and aunt
  - (Kingdom of Romania) The Crown Prince of Romania, husband of the bride and groom's mutual first cousin (representing the King of the Romanians)

=== Foreign royalty ===
- (Grand Duchy of Mecklenburg-Schwerin) Duke John Albert of Mecklenburg, the groom's second cousin once removed (representing the Grand Duke of Mecklenburg-Schwerin)
- (Grand Duchy of Baden) Prince and Princess Wilhelm of Baden, the bride and groom's mutual second cousin once removed and the groom's first cousin once removed (representing the Grand Duke of Baden)
- (Bavaria) The Duke of Leuchtenberg, the groom's first cousin once removed
- (Bavaria) Prince George Maximilianovich and Princess Anastasia of Leuchtenberg, the groom's first cousin once removed and his wife
- (Grand Duchy of Oldenburg) Duke and Duchess Alexander of Oldenburg, the groom's second cousin once removed and first cousin once removed of Nicholas II (cousin of the Grand Duke of Oldenburg)
  - (Grand Duchy of Oldenburg) Duke Peter Alexandrovich of Oldenburg, the groom's second cousin
- (Grand Duchy of Oldenburg) Duke Constantine Petrovich of Oldenburg, the groom's second cousin once removed
- (Grand Duchy of Mecklenburg-Strelitz) Duke Georg Alexander of Mecklenburg-Strelitz, the groom's second cousin once removed (nephew of the Grand Duke of Mecklenburg-Strelitz)
- (Grand Duchy of Mecklenburg-Strelitz) Duke Karl Michael of Mecklenburg-Strelitz, the groom's second cousin once removed
- (Duchy of Saxe-Altenburg) Prince and Princess Albert of Saxe-Altenburg, the bride and groom's mutual third cousin once removed and the groom's second cousin once removed (representing the Duke of Saxe-Altenburg)
