= Dmitry Ott =

Russian and Soviet obstetrician

In Eastern Slavic naming cultures, the patronym would be Oskarovich and the surname would be Ott.

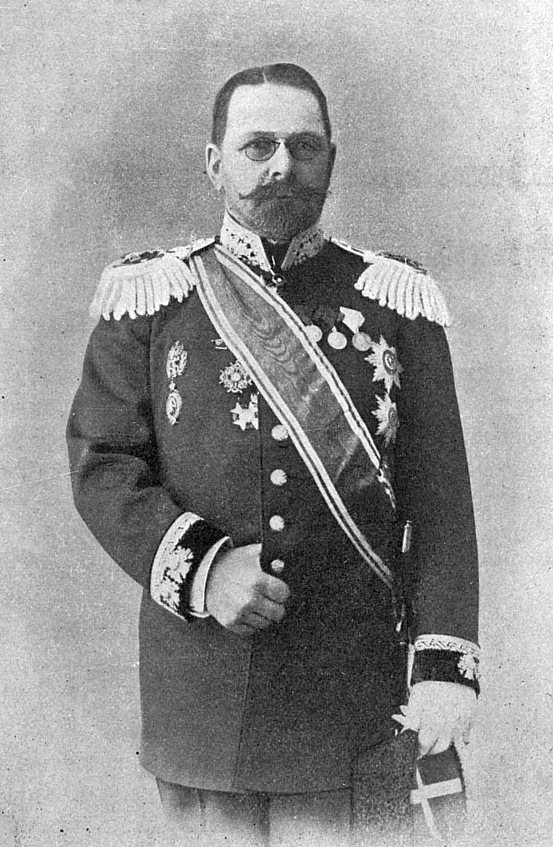

Dmitry Oskarovich Ott (Russian: Дми́трий Оска́рович Отт; b. February 23, 1855 in Plokhino, Zhizdrinsky Uyezd, Kaluga Governorate (now in Ulyanovsky District, Kaluga Oblast) - June 17, 1929, Leningrad) was a Russian and Soviet life obstetrician during the reign of Emperor Nicholas II.

== Biography ==
Dmitry was the first son of Oskar Fyodorovich Ott (1828-1883), the vice-governor of the Novgorod province.

In 1874 he graduated from the Novgorod school and entered the St. Petersburg Medical-Surgical Academy, from which he graduated in 1879.

Dmitry served as Professor of Clinical Institute for Grand Duchess Elena Pavlovna, since 1893 director of clinical obstetrics Imperial Institute (which now bears his name), and until 1906 Women's Medical Institute in St. Petersburg. For the first time, he almost proved and theoretically substantiated the efficacy of intravenous infusions of saline bloodless childbirth. His efforts in 1913 began to be used in gynecology radium. The founder of a new direction in operative gynecology, he played for laparotomy vaginal way, actively introduced asepsis, and developed methods of surgical treatment of prolapse and loss of sexual organs. Dmitry also constructed a number of new medical instruments (lighting Mirrors vaginal operations, etc.).

== Personal life ==
He was buried at the Novodevichy Cemetery in St. Petersburg, Russia.

Dmitry had a wife named Olga Nikolayevna. Their daughter Alexandra was born on 4 May 1880.
