= Prince Waldemar of Prussia (1889–1945) =

German prince

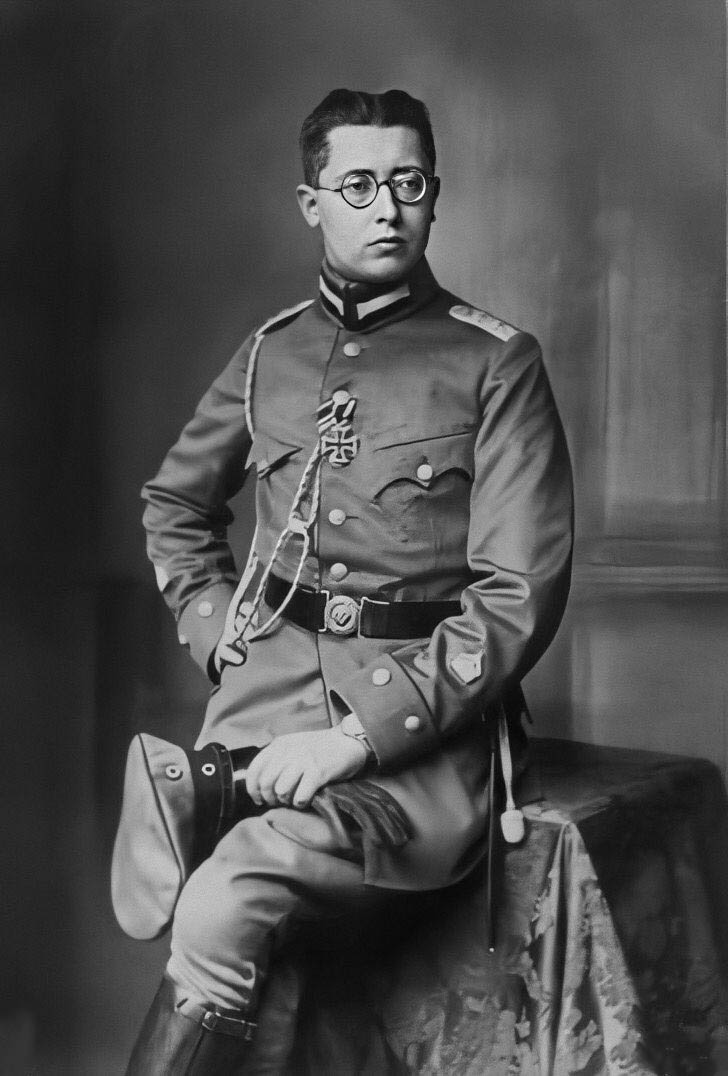
- Waldemar in 1915
- Born: 20 March 1889; Kiel, Schleswig-Holstein, German Empire
- Died: 2 May 1945 (aged 56); Tutzing, Bavaria, Nazi Germany
- Burial: 5 May 1945; Erbach, Hesse, Germany
- Spouse: Princess Calixta of Lippe (m. 1919)
Names
- German: Waldemar Wilhelm Ludwig Friedrich Viktor; English: Waldemar William Louis Frederick Victor
- House: Hohenzollern
- Father: Prince Henry of Prussia
- Mother: Princess Irene of Hesse and by Rhine

Prince Waldemar William Louis Frederick Victor of Prussia (German: Waldemar Wilhelm Ludwig Friedrich Viktor Heinrich; 20 March 1889 at Kiel – 2 May 1945 at Tutzing, Bavaria) was the eldest son of Prince Henry of Prussia and Princess Irene of Hesse and by Rhine. He was known as Toddy to his friends and family.

== Biography ==
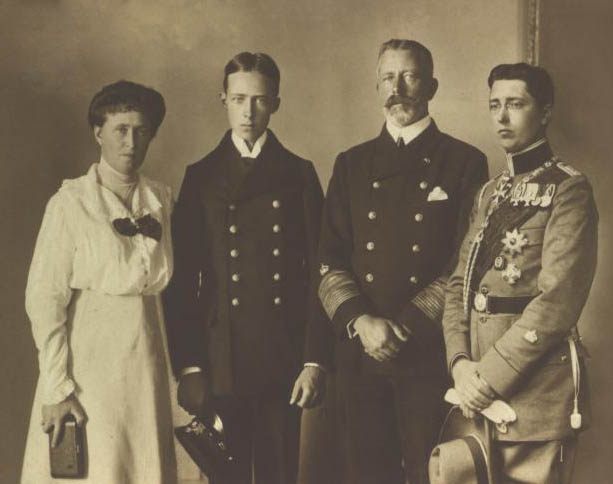
Prince Waldemar with his parents and younger brother, Sigismund

=== Marriage ===
Waldemar married Princess Calixta of Lippe (14 October 1895 – 15 December 1982) on 14 August 1919 at Hemmelmark.

=== Haemophilia and death ===
Waldemar, like his maternal first cousin, Tsarevich Alexei Nikolaevich of Russia; maternal uncle Prince Friedrich of Hesse and by Rhine; and youngest brother Henry, had haemophilia. He died in a clinic in Tutzing, Bavaria because of a lack of blood transfusion facilities. He and his wife fled their home in light of the Russian advance, arriving in Tutzing, where Waldemar was able to receive his last blood transfusion. The U.S. Army overran the area the next day, on 1 May 1945, and diverted all medical resources to treat nearby concentration camp victims, preventing Waldemar's doctor from treating him. Waldemar died the following day, on 2 May.

== Honours and awards ==
Prince Waldemar received the following awards:

- Knight of the Black Eagle, with Collar (Kingdom of Prussia)
- Grand Cross of the Red Eagle, with Crown (Kingdom of Prussia)
- Knight of the Prussian Crown, 1st Class (Kingdom of Prussia)
- Grand Commander of the Royal House Order of Hohenzollern (Kingdom of Prussia)
- Cross of Honour of the Princely House Order of Hohenzollern, 1st Class (House of Hohenzollern-Sigmaringen)
- Knight of the House Order of Fidelity, 1909 (Grand Duchy of Baden)
- Grand Cross of the Ludwig Order, 19 March 1910 (Grand Duchy of Hesse and by Rhine)
- Knight of the Rue Crown (Kingdom of Saxony)
- Grand Cordon of the Order of the Chrysanthemum, 6 May 1912 (Empire of Japan)
- Grand Cross of St. Alexander, with Swords, 1916 (Kingdom of Bulgaria)

== Ancestry ==
Ancestors of Prince Waldemar of Prussia (1889–1945)

8. William I, German Emperor
4. Frederick III, German Emperor
9. Princess Augusta of Saxe-Weimar-Eisenach
2. Prince Henry of Prussia
10. Prince Albert of Saxe-Coburg and Gotha
5. Victoria, Princess Royal
11. Victoria of the United Kingdom
1. Prince Waldemar of Prussia
12. Prince Charles of Hesse and by Rhine
6. Louis IV, Grand Duke of Hesse and by Rhine
13. Princess Elisabeth of Prussia
3. Princess Irene of Hesse and by Rhine
14. Prince Albert of Saxe-Coburg and Gotha (= 10)
7. Princess Alice of the United Kingdom
15. Victoria of the United Kingdom (= 11)
