= Prince Heinrich of Prussia (disambiguation) =

Prince Heinrich of Prussia may refer to:

- Prince Henry of Prussia (1726–1802); third surviving son of Frederick William I of Prussia and Sophia Dorothea of Hanover, and the younger brother of Frederick the Great.
- Prince Henry of Prussia (1747–1767); second son of Prince Augustus William of Prussia and Duchess Luise of Brunswick-Wolfenbüttel, and the younger brother of Frederick William II of Prussia.
- Prince Henry of Prussia (1781–1846); third son of Frederick William II of Prussia and Frederica Louisa of Hesse-Darmstadt, and the younger brother of Frederick William III of Prussia.
- Prince Henry of Prussia (1862–1929); second son of Frederick III, German Emperor and Victoria, Princess Royal, and the younger brother of Wilhelm II, German Emperor.
- Prince Henry of Prussia (1900–1904); third son of Prince Henry of Prussia and Princess Irene of Hesse and by Rhine.
