= Princess Henry =

Princess Henry may refer to:

- Princess Beatrice of the United Kingdom (1857–1944), wife of Prince Henry of Battenberg
- Princess Irene of Hesse and by Rhine (1866–1953), wife of Prince Henry of Prussia
- Princess Alice, Duchess of Gloucester (1901–2004), wife of Prince Henry, Duke of Gloucester
- Meghan, Duchess of Sussex (1981–Present), wife of Prince Henry (Harry), Duke of Sussex
