= Prince Henry of Prussia (born 1900) =

German prince (1900–1904)

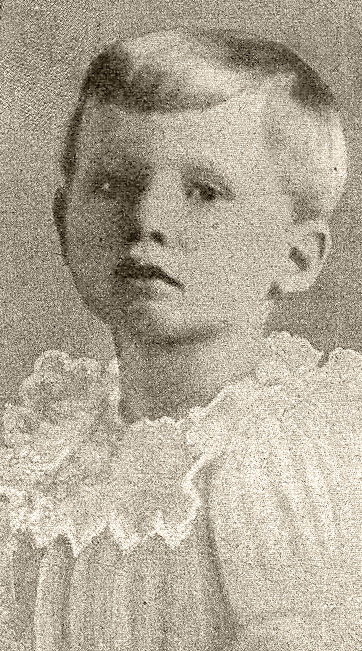
- Prince Henry c. 1903
- Born: 9 January 1900; Kiel, Schleswig-Holstein, German Empire
- Died: 26 February 1904 (aged 4); Kiel, Schleswig-Holstein, German Empire
- Burial: 29 February 1904; Schloss Hemmelmark, Barkelsby, Schleswig-Holstein, German Empire
Names
- English: Henry Victor Louis Frederick; German: Heinrich Viktor Ludwig Friedrich
- House: Hohenzollern
- Father: Prince Henry of Prussia
- Mother: Princess Irene of Hesse and by Rhine
- Religion: Evangelical Christian

Prince Henry Victor Louis Frederick of Prussia (German: Heinrich Viktor Ludwig Friedrich; 9 January 1900 – 26 February 1904), was the third son and youngest child of Prince Henry of Prussia and Princess Irene of Hesse and by Rhine. He was a grandson of Frederick III, German Emperor, through his father and a great-grandson of Queen Victoria. He died at the age of four after his hemophilia exacerbated a head injury.

== Life ==
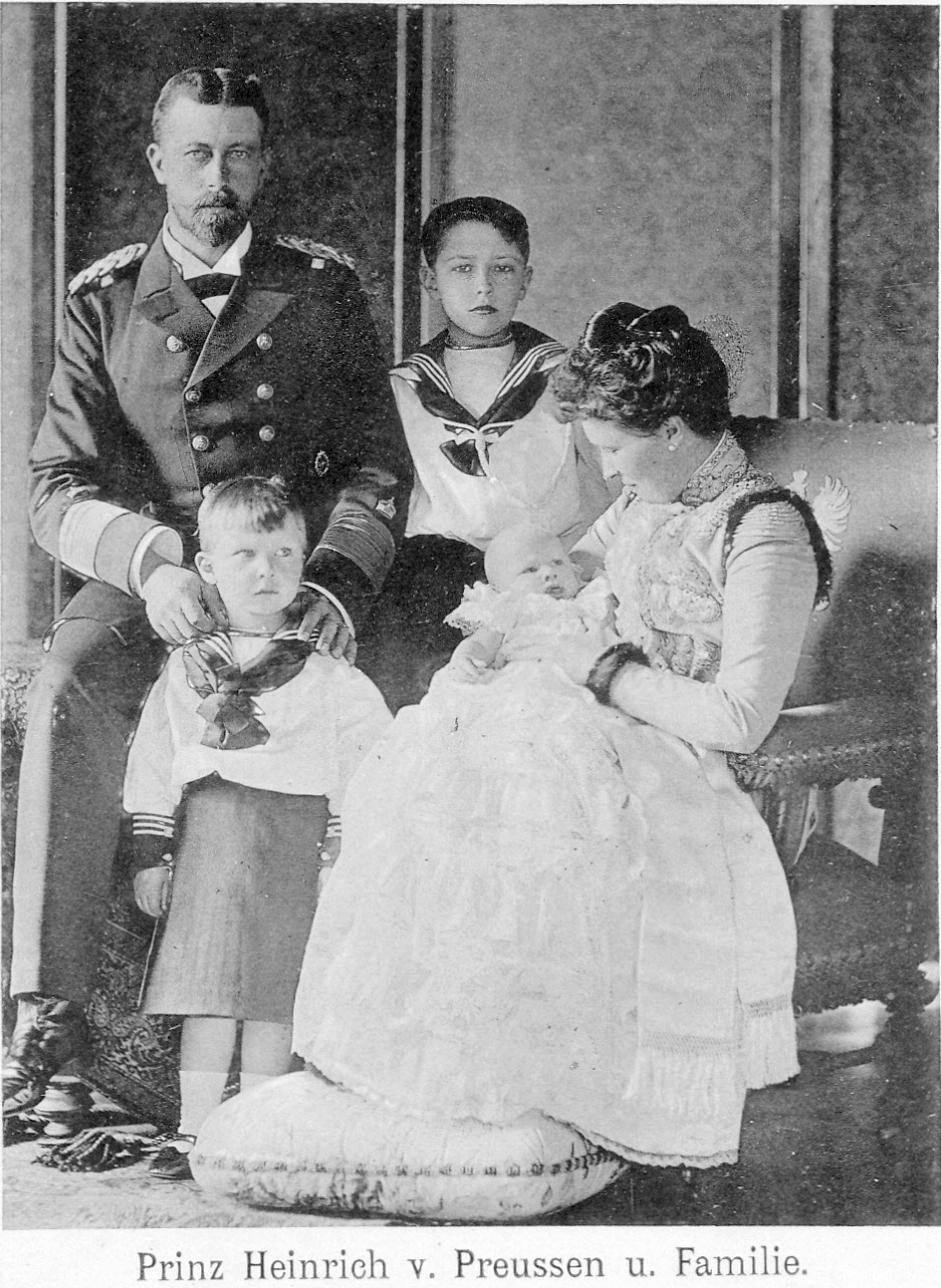
Prince Heinrich with his family in 1900

Prince Heinrich was born on 9 January 1900, in Kiel. He immediately received the title Prince of Prussia upon birth with the style Royal Highness, and was baptised Heinrich Viktor Ludwig Friedrich in Kiel Castle on 15 March 1900. His older brothers were Prince Waldemar, a namesake of his uncle, and Prince Sigismund, a namesake of his other deceased uncle. Heinrich was named in honour of his father. The Prince was diagnosed with haemophilia as a young child, but, despite this, was a very cheerful and lively boy who liked to play a lot. As Henry grew older he became more aware of his condition.

== Death ==
On 25 February, Princess Irene left Heinrich unsupervised for a few minutes while she went to fetch something. The playful Prince climbed a chair, and then he climbed onto the table. As he heard his mother approaching, he attempted to quickly come down but stumbled while attempting to climb down the chair and fell on the floor headfirst. He started to scream, which immediately attracted the Princess' attention. By the time she reached him, the child was almost unconscious. The doctor said the fall had not been that bad and the child would have survived had he not been a haemophiliac. However, experiencing this condition, it was certain the young Prince would die. He was experiencing a brain haemorrhage. He lingered for a couple of hours, but died the following day, on 26 February. He was four years old.

== Aftermath ==
Prince Heinrich's premature death would later very much affect the Princess, who would withdraw into herself. One of his older brothers, Prince Waldemar, also had haemophilia. He lived up to the age of 56 and was married, without children. The middle sibling, Prince Sigismund, was unaffected by the disease.

== Ancestry ==
Ancestors of Prince Henry of Prussia (born 1900)

8. Wilhelm I, German Emperor
4. Frederick III, German Emperor
9. Princess Augusta of Saxe-Weimar-Eisenach
2. Prince Henry of Prussia
10. Prince Albert of Saxe-Coburg and Gotha
5. Victoria, Princess Royal
11. Queen Victoria of the United Kingdom
1. Prince Henry of Prussia
12. Prince Charles of Hesse and by Rhine
6. Louis IV, Grand Duke of Hesse and by Rhine
13. Princess Elisabeth of Prussia
3. Princess Irene of Hesse and by Rhine
14. Prince Albert of Saxe-Coburg and Gotha (= 10)
7. Princess Alice of the United Kingdom
15. Queen Victoria of the United Kingdom (= 11)

== Notes ==
Haemophilia in European royalty

Queen Victoria; Xx	Albert; XY
Victoria; X?	Edward VII; XY	Alice; Xx	Louis IV; XY	Alfred; XY	Helena; X?	Louise; X?	Arthur; XY	Leopold xY	Helen; XX	Beatrice; Xx	Henry; XY
Victoria; X?	Elisabeth; X?	Irene; Xx	Henry; XY	Ernest Louis; XY	Frederick xY	Alix; Xx	Nicholas II; XY	Alice; Xx	Alexander; XY
Waldemar xY	Sigismund; XY	Henry xY	Olga; XX?	Tatiana; XX?	Maria; Xx?	Anastasia; Xx?	Alexei xY
May; X?	Rupert xY	Maurice; XY
Alexander; XY	Victoria Eugenie; Xx	Alfonso XIII; XY	Leopold xY	Maurice; XY
Alfonso xY	Jaime; XY	Beatriz; X?	Maria Cristina; X?	Juan; XY	Gonzalo xY

Legend: X – unaffected X chromosome; x – affected X chromosome; Y – Y chromosome; ? - unknown carrier status
Source: Aronova-Tiuntseva, Yelena; Herreid, Clyde Freeman (20 September 2003). "Hemophilia: 'The Royal Disease'" (PDF). SciLinks. National Science Teachers Association. p. 7. Archived from the original (PDF) on 10 January 2018.
