= Princess Alice of the United Kingdom =

British princess (1843–1878)

Princess Alice
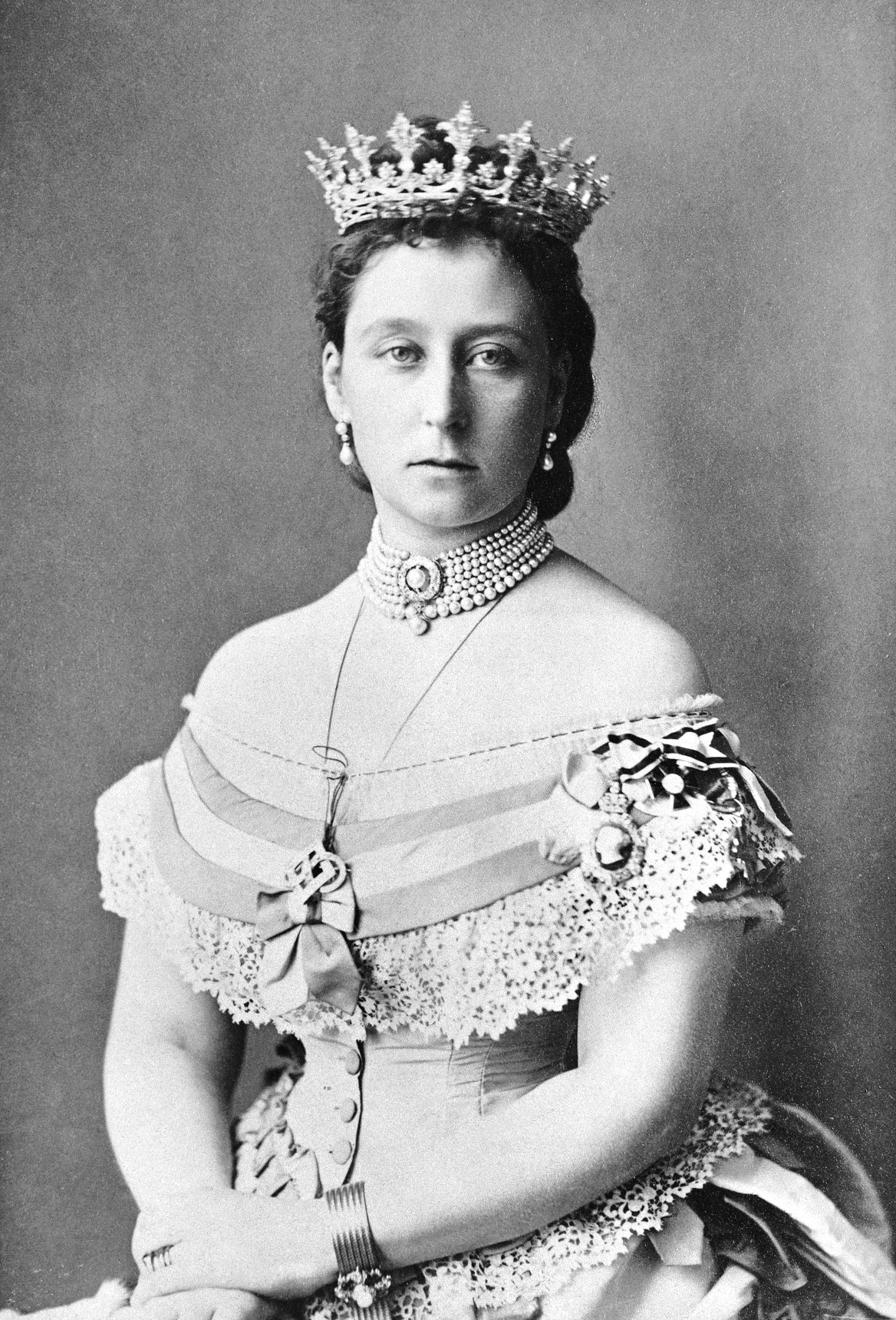
- Photograph by Franz Backofen, 1871

Grand Duchess consort of Hesse and by Rhine
- Tenure: 13 June 1877 – 14 December 1878
- Born: 25 April 1843; Buckingham Palace, London, England
- Died: 14 December 1878 (aged 35); New Palace, Darmstadt, Grand Duchy of Hesse, German Empire
- Burial: 18 December 1878; New Mausoleum, Rosenhöhe Park, Darmstadt, Grand Duchy of Hesse, German Empire
- Spouse: Louis IV, Grand Duke of Hesse and by Rhine (m. 1862)
- Issue: Victoria Mountbatten, Marchioness of Milford Haven; Grand Duchess Elizabeth Feodorovna of Russia; Irene, Princess Henry of Prussia; Ernest Louis, Grand Duke of Hesse and by Rhine; Prince Friedrich; Alexandra Feodorovna, Empress of Russia; Princess Marie
Names
- Alice Maud Mary
- House: Saxe-Coburg and Gotha
- Father: Prince Albert of Saxe-Coburg and Gotha
- Mother: Queen Victoria

Princess Alice (Alice Maud Mary; 25 April 1843 – 14 December 1878) was Grand Duchess of Hesse and by Rhine from 13 June 1877 until her death in 1878 as the wife of Grand Duke Louis IV. She was the third child and second daughter of Queen Victoria and Prince Albert of Saxe-Coburg and Gotha. Alice was the first of Queen Victoria's nine children to die and one of three to predecease their mother.

Alice spent her early childhood in the company of her parents and siblings, travelling between the British royal residences. Her education was devised by Prince Albert's close friend and adviser, Christian Friedrich, Baron Stockmar, and included practical activities such as needlework and woodwork and languages such as French and German. When her father became fatally ill in December 1861, Alice nursed him until his death. Following his death, Queen Victoria entered a period of intense mourning and Alice spent the next six months acting as her mother's unofficial secretary. On 1 July 1862, while the court was still at the height of mourning, Alice married a minor German prince, Louis of Hesse. The ceremony—conducted privately and with unrelieved gloom at Osborne House—was described by the Queen as "more of a funeral than a wedding". Alice's life in Darmstadt was unhappy as a result of impoverishment, family tragedy and worsening relations with her husband and mother.

Alice showed an interest in nursing, especially the work of Florence Nightingale. When Hesse became involved in the Austro-Prussian War, Darmstadt filled with the injured; the heavily pregnant Alice devoted much of her time to the management of field hospitals. One of her organisations, the Princess Alice Women's Guild, took over much of the day-to-day running of the state's military hospitals. As a result of this activity, Queen Victoria became concerned about Alice's directness about medical and, in particular, gynaecological, matters. In 1871, she wrote to Alice's younger sister, Princess Louise, who had recently married: "Don't let Alice pump you. Be very silent and cautious about your 'interior'". In 1877, Alice became grand duchess upon the accession of her husband, her increased duties putting further strains on her health. In late 1878, diphtheria infected the Hessian court. Alice nursed her family for over a month before falling ill herself, dying later that year.

Alice was the sister of King Edward VII and German Empress Victoria (wife of Frederick III), mother of Empress Alexandra Feodorovna of Russia (wife of Nicholas II), and maternal grandmother of Queen Louise of Sweden (second wife of Gustaf VI Adolf) and Louis Mountbatten, 1st Earl Mountbatten of Burma (the last Viceroy of India). Another daughter, Elisabeth, who married Grand Duke Sergei Alexandrovich of Russia, was, like Alexandra and her family, killed by the Bolsheviks in 1918.

== Early life ==
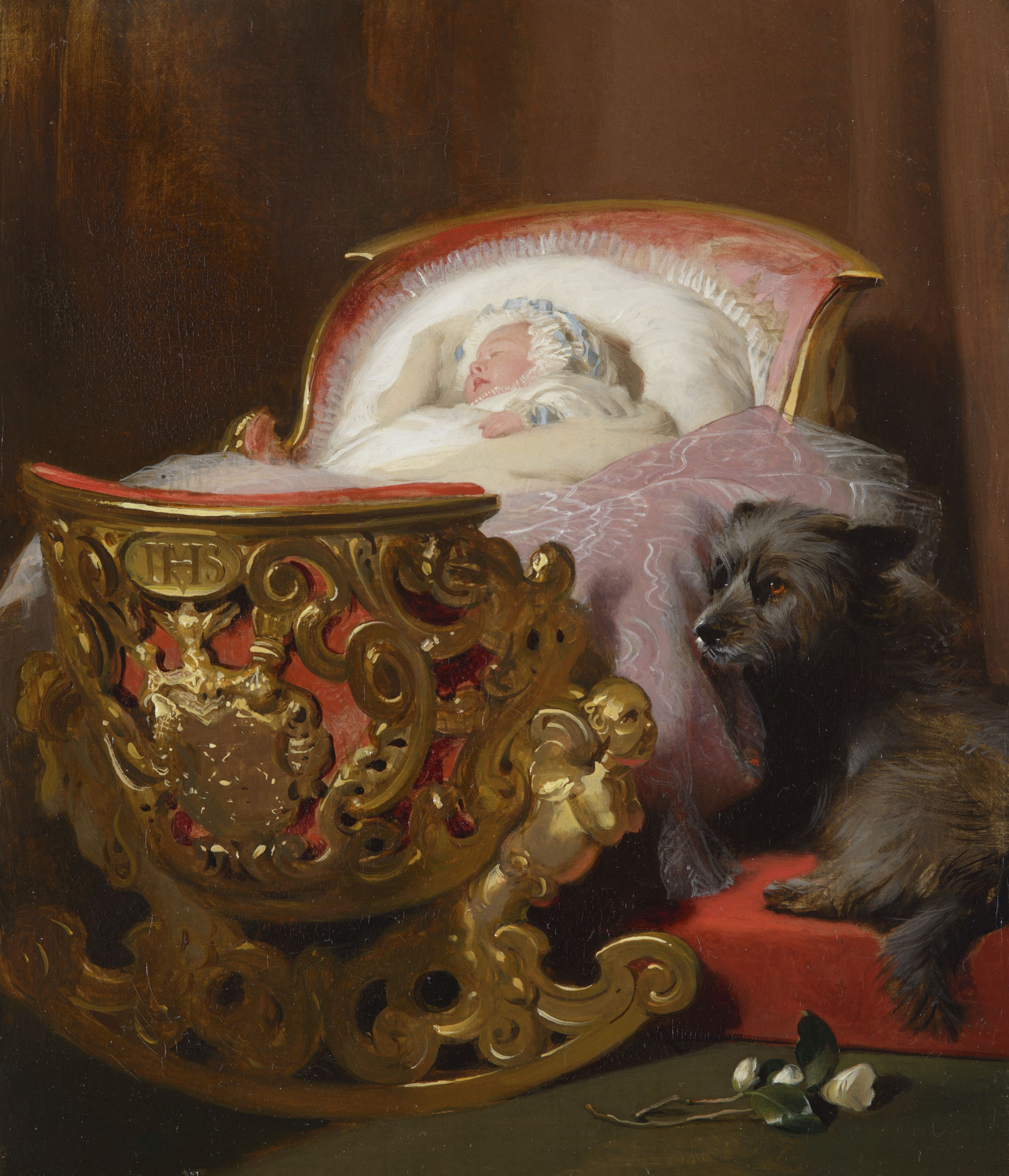
Painting of baby Princess Alice by Edwin Landseer, 1843. Prince Albert ordered this painting as a surprise gift to his wife.

Alice was born at 4:00 am on 25 April 1843 at Buckingham Palace in London. She was christened "Alice Maud Mary" in the private chapel at Buckingham Palace by the Archbishop of Canterbury, William Howley, on 2 June. Her sex was greeted with mixed feelings from the public, and even the Privy Council sent a message to Albert expressing its "congratulation and condolence" on the birth of a second daughter. Her godparents were Ernest Augustus, King of Hanover (her great-uncle; for whom the Duke of Cambridge stood proxy), the Princess of Hohenlohe-Langenburg (her aunt; for whom the Duchess of Kent stood proxy), the Hereditary Prince of Saxe-Coburg and Gotha (her uncle; for whom the Hereditary Grand Duke of Mecklenburg-Strelitz stood proxy) and Princess Sophia of Gloucester (her cousin).

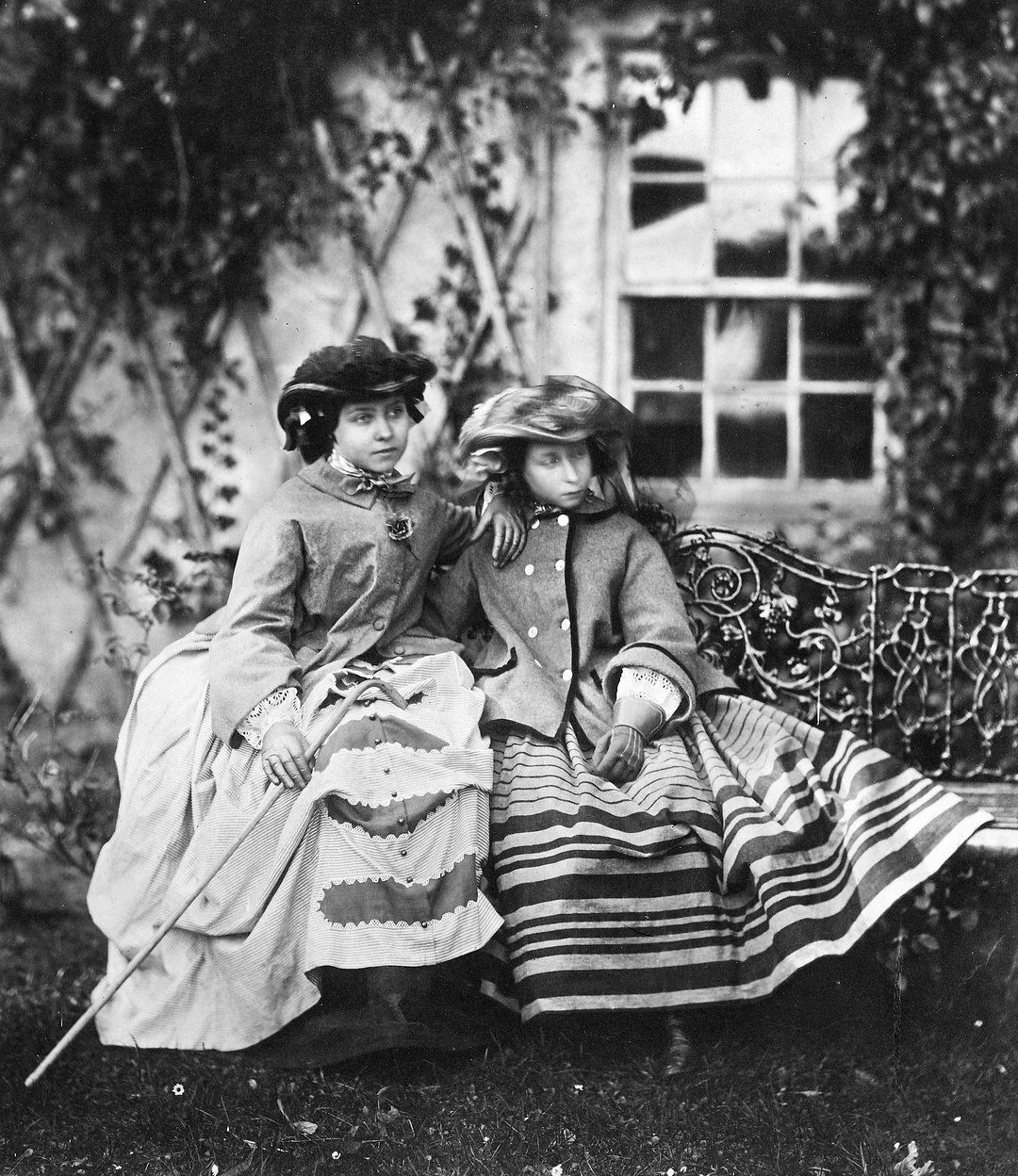
Alice (right) and her sister Victoria in the 1850s

Alice's birth prompted her parents to find a larger family home. Buckingham Palace was not equipped with the private apartments that Victoria's growing family needed, including suitable nurseries. Therefore, in 1844, Victoria and Albert purchased Osborne House on the Isle of Wight as a family holiday home. Alice's education was devised by her father and his close friend, Baron Stockmar. At Osborne, Alice and her siblings were taught practical skills such as housekeeping, cooking, gardening and carpentry, as well as daily lessons in English, French and German.

Victoria and Albert favoured a monarchy based on family values; Alice and her siblings, who wore middle class clothing on a daily basis, slept in sparsely furnished bedrooms with little heating. Alice was fascinated with the world outside the Royal Household; at Balmoral, where she seemed happiest, she visited the tenants living and working on the estate. On one occasion, she escaped from her governess at the chapel at Windsor Castle and sat in a public pew, so she could better understand people who were not strict adherents to royal protocol. In 1854, during the Crimean War, the eleven-year-old Alice toured London hospitals for wounded soldiers with her mother and her eldest sister. She was the most emotionally sensitive of her siblings and was sympathetic to other people's burdens, possessing a sharp tongue and an easily triggered temper.

Alice was considered to be one of the most beautiful of Queen Victoria's daughters. When she was a year old, her father mentioned her as 'the beauty of the family.' Her sister Vicky was convinced that Alice was a beauty and sent her mother a picture of the two of them with their babies in the autumn of 1864 with the comment, "the ugly sister & the pretty one (the 1st of course myself)." Vicky's father-in-law preferred Alice for her beauty, as her sister said, he was never "so amiably disposed" toward her as when her prettier sister was around. In her childhood, Alice formed a close relationship with her brother, the Prince of Wales, and her eldest sister, the Princess Royal. Victoria's marriage to Prince Frederick William of Prussia in 1858 greatly upset her.

=== Family caregiver ===
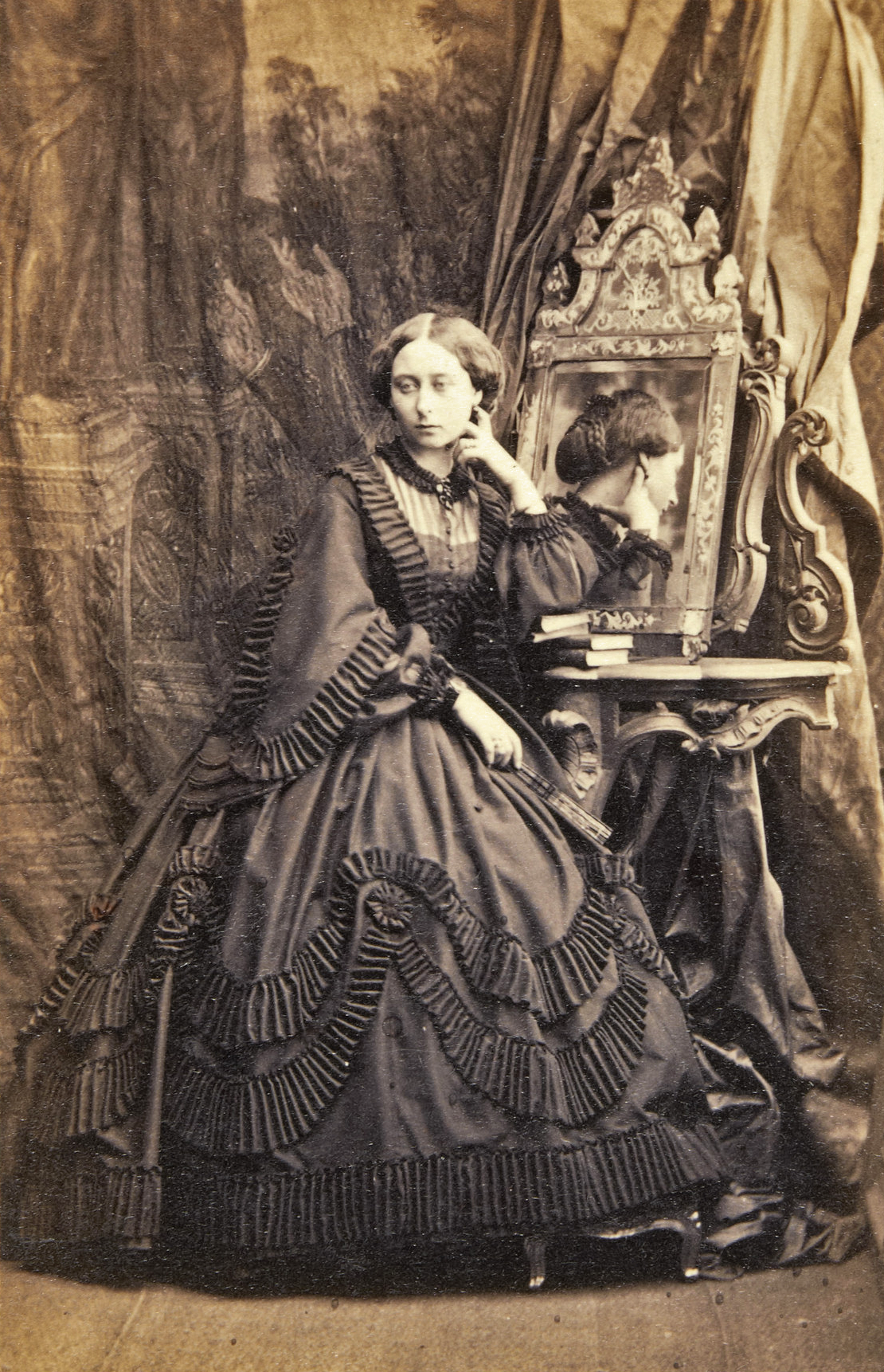
Photograph by Camille Silvy, June 1861

Alice's compassion for other people's suffering established her role as the family caregiver in 1861. Her maternal grandmother Victoria, Duchess of Kent, died at Frogmore on 16 March 1861. Alice had spent much of her time at her grandmother's side, often played the piano for her in Frogmore's drawing room, and nursed her through the final stages of illness. Following her mother's death, the Queen broke down with grief and relied heavily on Alice, to whom Albert had given the instruction: "Go and comfort Mama." The Queen wrote to her uncle, King Leopold I of Belgium, that "dear good Alice was full of intense tenderness, affection and distress for me".

Only a few months later, on 14 December 1861, Albert died at Windsor Castle. During his final illness, Alice remained at his bedside. Alice sent for the Prince of Wales by telegram, without the knowledge of the Queen, who refused to notify him because she blamed him for Albert's death. The Queen was distraught by her husband's death, and the court entered a period of intense mourning. Alice became her mother's unofficial secretary, and for the next six months, the physical representation of the monarch. Through her passed the Queen's official papers to and from her government ministers, while the Queen secluded herself from all public life. Alice was aided in this task by her younger sister Princess Louise. Although Princess Helena, Louise's elder sister, would normally have been selected to assist, her inability to go long without crying was held against her.

== Marriage ==
=== Suitors ===
Alice's matrimonial plans were begun in 1860 by her mother. Queen Victoria had expressed her wish that her children should marry for love, but this did not mean that her choice of suitors would necessarily be extended to anybody outside the royal houses of Europe. Raising a British subject to royalty, however high their rank, was politically objectionable, and also wasted any opportunity for a useful foreign alliance. The Queen instructed her daughter Victoria, recently married to Prince Frederick William of Prussia, to produce a list of eligible princes in Europe. Her search produced only two suitable candidates: William, Prince of Orange; and Prince Albert of Prussia, cousin to Victoria's husband Frederick William. The Prince of Orange was soon discounted. He journeyed to Windsor Castle so that Queen Victoria could look him over in person, but he proved unpalatable to Alice. The prince too showed little interest in Alice, despite strong pressure from his pro-British mother, Queen Sophie of the Netherlands. Prince Albert, too, was spurned, with Prince Frederick William remarking that his cousin would not do for "one who deserves the very best".

With both of the leading candidates now discounted, Princess Victoria suggested Prince Louis of Hesse, a minor German royal, the nephew of the Grand Duke of Hesse. Princess Victoria had gone to the court of Hesse to inspect Louis's sister, Princess Anna, as a potential bride for her brother, the Prince of Wales. Although not favourably impressed with Princess Anna, she was impressed with Louis and his brother Prince Henry. Both were invited to Windsor Castle in 1860, ostensibly so they could watch the Ascot Races in the company of the royal family, but in reality, the visit was a chance for the Queen to inspect her potential son-in-law. The Queen admired both Louis and Henry, but noted how well Louis and Alice got along together. When the Hessian family departed, Louis requested Alice's photograph, and Alice made it clear that she was attracted to him.

=== Engagement and wedding ===
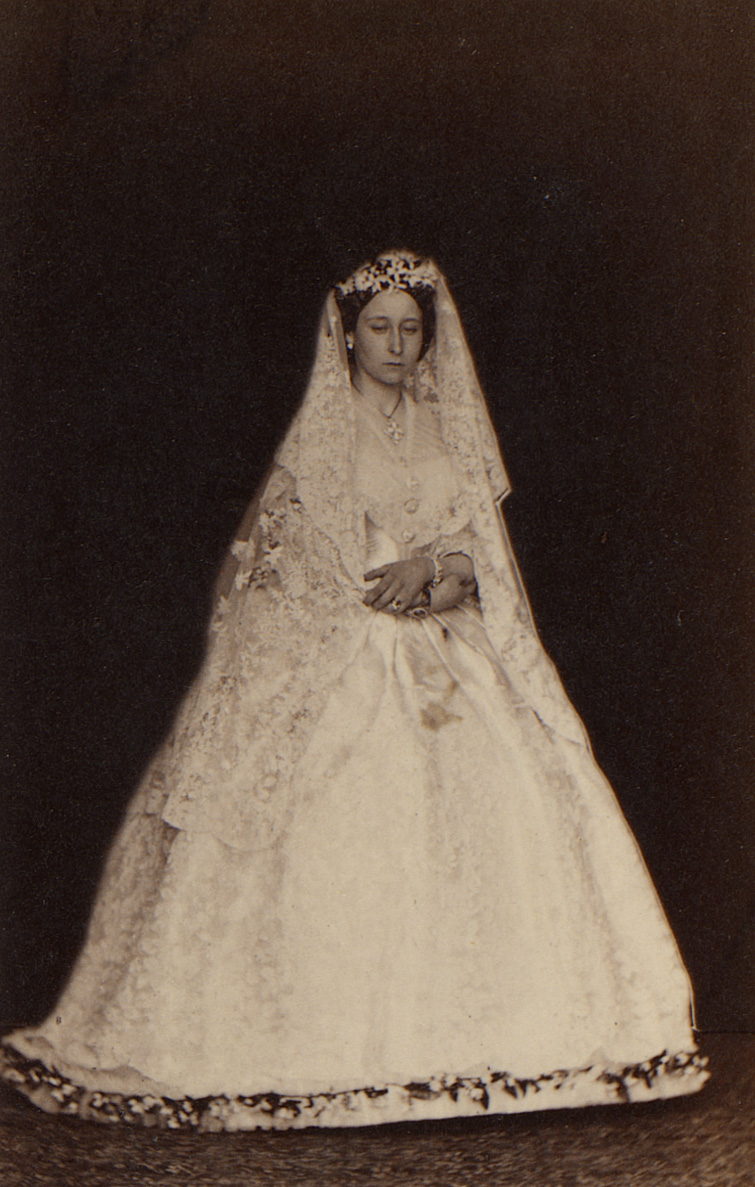
Alice in her wedding dress, 1862

Alice was engaged to Prince Louis of Hesse on 30 April 1861, following the Queen's consent. The Queen persuaded the Prime Minister, Lord Palmerston, to secure the agreement of Parliament for Alice to receive a dowry of £30,000 (£3.09 million as of 2025). Although the amount was considered generous at the time, Prince Albert remarked that "she will not be able to do great things with it" in the little realm of Hesse, compared to the riches that her sister Victoria would inherit as future Queen of Prussia and German Empress. Furthermore, the couple's future home in Darmstadt, the Grand Ducal seat, was uncertain. Although Queen Victoria expected that a new palace would be built, the people of Darmstadt did not want to meet that expense, and the resulting controversy caused resentment there. This meant that Alice was unpopular in Darmstadt before she even arrived.

Between the engagement and the wedding, Alice's father died on 14 December 1861. Despite the Queen's grief, she ordered that the wedding should continue as planned. On 1 July 1862, Alice and Louis were married privately in the dining room of Osborne House, which was converted into a temporary chapel. The Queen was ushered in by her four sons, acting as a living screen blocking her from view, and took her place in an armchair near the altar. Alice was given away by her uncle, Albert's brother Ernest II, Duke of Saxe-Coburg and Gotha, and was flanked by four bridesmaids: her younger sisters, Princesses Helena, Louise and Beatrice, as well as Louis's sister Princess Anna. For the ceremony, Alice wore a simple white dress, with a veil of Honiton lace and a wreath of orange blossom and myrtle, but was required to wear black mourning clothes before and after the ceremony. The Queen, sitting in an armchair, struggled to hold back her tears, and was shielded from view by the Prince of Wales and Prince Alfred, her second son, who cried throughout the service. The weather at Osborne was dreary, with winds blowing up from the Channel. The Queen wrote to her eldest daughter, Victoria, that the ceremony was "more of a funeral than a wedding", and remarked to Alfred, Lord Tennyson that it was "the saddest day I can remember". The ceremony—described by Gerard Noel as "the saddest royal wedding in modern times"—was over by 4 pm, and the couple set off for their honeymoon at St Claire in Ryde, a house lent to them by the Vernon Harcourt family. Alice's entourage consisted of Lady Churchill, General Seymour and Baron Westerweller (a Hessian courtier). Alice was careful not to displease the Queen after her marriage. When the Queen visited the couple at St Claire, Alice tried not to appear "too happy". Despite this, Alice's displays of romantic bliss made the Queen jealous of her daughter's happiness.

== Prince Louis of Hesse ==
=== Settling in Darmstadt ===
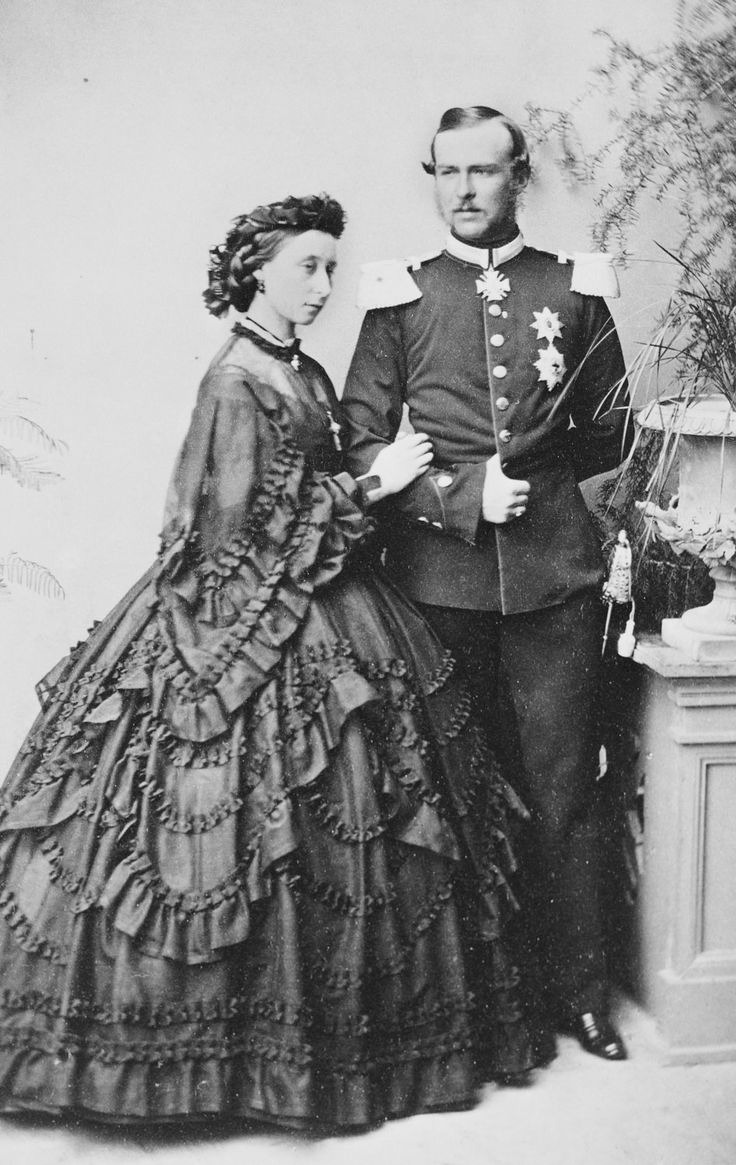
Alice with her husband Louis, 1860s

Alice and Louis arrived at Bingen on 12 July 1862 and were greeted by cheering crowds gathered in spite of pouring rain. After being introduced to town officials, they took a train to Mainz, where they had breakfast, before taking a steamer along the Rhine to Gustavsburg. From there, they took a train to Darmstadt, where they were greeted with great enthusiasm. Alice wrote back to her mother that "I believe the people never gave so hearty a welcome", while her sister Helena wrote that "nothing could have been more enthusiastic than her entry into Darmstadt was". Alice did not adapt immediately to her new surroundings. She was homesick, and could not believe that while she was so far away from England, her father was not still alive and comforting her mother. The Queen confided to her journal:

Already nearly a fortnight since our dear Alice has left and strange to say – much as she has been to me – and dear and precious as a comfort and an assistance, I hardly miss her at all, or felt her going – so utterly alone am I – by that one dreadful loss – that one thought, that everything passed by unheeded!

The question of Alice's residence became an issue after her arrival, with the Grand Duke unwilling to fund a residence befitting a daughter of Queen Victoria with the low Hessian funds. The pair were given a house in Darmstadt's "Old Quarter", which overlooked the street. The carts rumbling past could easily be heard through the house's thin walls. However, it seemed to suit Alice well, and she spent as much time in Hesse as possible to familiarise herself with her new surroundings. She took art lessons from the court painter Paul Weber.

In 1863, she travelled to England for the marriage of her brother, the Prince of Wales, and Princess Alexandra of Denmark. Alice delivered her first child, Victoria, on 5 April in the presence of Queen Victoria. The Darmstadt court chaplain was called over to England especially for the christening. Alice's relationship with her mother became difficult, which would continue until her death. After returning to Darmstadt in May, Alice and Louis were given a new residence, Kranichstein, north-east of Darmstadt. Alice gave birth to her second daughter Elisabeth, nicknamed "Ella", on 1 November 1864; Alice's decision to breastfeed her newborn daughter upset her mother, who was against breastfeeding. The Queen was further upset at the realisation that Alice, having found true happiness, would be visiting England less and less.

=== Austro-Prussian War ===
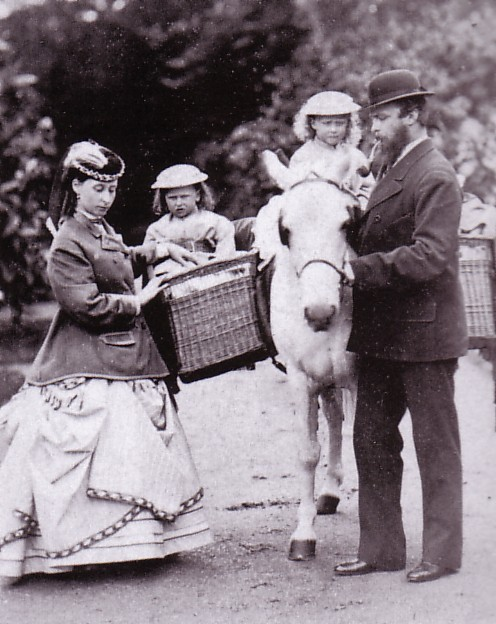
Alice with Louis and two of their children – Princess Victoria and Princess Elizabeth in 1866–67

In 1866, Austria called for Prussia to hand over administration of Schleswig-Holstein, which had until that point been jointly administered by the two powers, to the Duke of Augustenberg. Prussia refused, and Otto von Bismarck sent troops into Austrian-administered Holstein. This provoked war between Austria and Prussia, with Hesse siding with the Austrians, technically making Alice and her sister Victoria enemies.

Alice, heavily pregnant with her third child, saw Louis depart to command the Hessian cavalry against the Prussians, and sent her children to stay with Queen Victoria in England. Despite her pregnancy, she performed the royal duties expected of her sex and station, making bandages for troops and preparing hospitals. On 11 July, she gave birth to Princess Irene; Prussian troops were on the verge of entering Darmstadt, she begged the Grand Duke to surrender on Prussia's terms. This provoked fury from the fiercely anti-Prussian Prince Alexander, but Alice realised that the conquered German states would likely form a union which she, like her sister Victoria, supported.

Alice and Louis communicated extensively during the war, with Alice urging Louis not to take too many risks, and Louis urging her not to worry. Panic ensued in Darmstadt, with the youth corps fleeing their posts, leaving only the palace sentries to defend the city. Eventually an armistice between Prussia and Hesse was concluded, and Louis wrote that they were now "safe". He was reunited with Alice after the two met unexpectedly in the street, and they visited the wounded together. The Prussians entered Darmstadt, and Alice devoted much of her time to the sick and wounded. She was a friend of Florence Nightingale, who was able to collect and send money from England, and Alice used Nightingale's advice as to cleanliness and ventilation in hospitals.

Despite being relieved that war was over, Alice was appalled by the behaviour of Prussian troops in Hesse; Berlin took the grand duchy's railways and telegraph systems, and assessed Hesse for three million florins in indemnity. Alice wrote to her mother, who in turn wrote to Princess Victoria, who responded that there was nothing she could do to relieve the "painful and distressing position darling Alice was in", as it was "one of the unavoidable results of this dreadful war". Influence came from Emperor Alexander II of Russia, who urged the King Wilhelm I of Prussia to allow the Grand Duke to keep his throne. The facts that the Emperor's wife was the Grand Duke's aunt, and Alice's sister being also the Prussian Crown Princess are likely to have influenced Prussia's generosity. However, Alice was angered by an untactful visit by Princess Victoria to the conquered region of Homburg, originally part of Hesse, shortly after it became Prussian territory.

=== Religious beliefs ===
Alice developed a friendship with the theologian David Friedrich Strauss. He was a controversial figure at the time; in 1835, he published The Life of Jesus, which argued that the miracles of Jesus were nonfactual myths and that the Bible could not be literally interpreted as God's word, a view akin to heresy in orthodox circles. Alice's view was similar to Strauss's, and she believed that contemporary Victorian society was presenting God in a way that would be "unrecognisable to early Christians". Strauss also offered Alice an intellectual companionship that her husband was not equipped to provide, and he was regularly invited to the New Palace to read to Alice privately. The friendship flourished; Strauss was introduced to Alice's sister Victoria and her brother-in-law Frederick William, and he was invited by them to Berlin. In 1870, Strauss wanted to dedicate his new work Lectures on Voltaire to Alice, but he was too afraid to ask her; she spared him the need by asking him to dedicate them to her. However, Alice's relationship with Strauss angered Empress Augusta, who labelled Alice a "complete atheist" after hearing about his promotion.

== Later life ==
Tragedy befell Alice on 29 May 1873, when her youngest and favourite son, Friedrich, called "Frittie", died after falling 20 feet (6.1 m) from a window. The child suffered from haemophilia, and although he regained consciousness, the internal bleeding could not be stopped. Alice never recovered from Frittie's death, writing to her mother two months later: "I am glad you have a little coloured picture of my darling. I feel lower and sadder than ever and miss him so much, so continually." However, the Queen's attention was more focused on the engagement of her son Prince Alfred to the Grand Duchess Marie Alexandrovna of Russia, the only surviving daughter of Tsar Alexander II and his first wife, Empress Maria Alexandrovna. The Tsar had refused to present his daughter for pre-marriage inspection in England, and instead invited the Queen to meet the family in Germany. Alice supported this suggestion, and on the same day she wrote to the Queen about how much she missed Frittie, the Queen wrote to Alice in scathing terms: "You have entirely taken the Russian side, and I do not think, dear child, that you should tell me...what I ought to do."

After Frittie's death, Alice attached herself more closely to her only surviving son, Ernest, and her newborn daughter Marie. In 1875 she resumed her public duties, including fund-raising, medical and social work, which had always held her interest. She maintained active correspondence with the social reformer Octavia Hill. However, in these years, relations with her husband deteriorated. In late 1876, she travelled to Britain for treatment due to an internal complaint caused by a backward curvature of the uterus, and remained at Balmoral while she recovered. From Balmoral, she wrote to her husband criticising the childishness of his letters: "[i]f my children wrote me such childish letters – only short accounts – of where and what they had eaten or where they had been etc., and no opinions, observations and remarks, I should be surprised – and how much more so when you write like that!" On 3 October 1876, she wrote another despairing letter to Louis:

I longed for real companionship, for apart from that life had nothing to offer me in Darmstadt...So naturally I am bitterly disappointed with myself when I look back, and see that in spite of great ambitions, good intentions, and real effort, my hopes have nevertheless been completely ship-wrecked...You say, darling, that you would never have caused me hardship intentionally...I only regret the lack of any intention or desire – or rather insight – to be more to me, and that does not mean spending all your time with me, without wishing to share anything with me at the same time. But I am wrong to talk of these things. Your letters are so dear and kind – but so empty and bare – I feel myself through them that I have less to say to you than any other person. Rain – fine weather – things that have happened – that is all I ever have to tell you about – so utterly cut off is my real self, my innermost life, from yours...I have tried again and again to talk to you about more serious things, when I felt the need to do so – but we never meet each other – we have developed separately...and that is why I feel true companionship is an impossibility for us – because our thoughts will never meet...I love you too so very much, my darling husband, and that is why it is so sad to feel that our life is nevertheless so incomplete...But you are never intentionally to blame for this – I never think that, never...

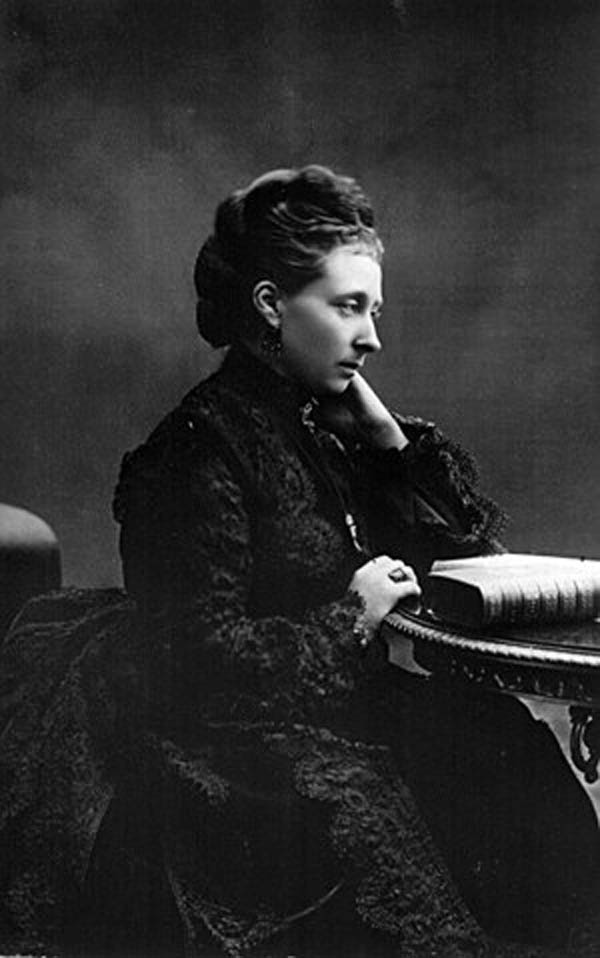
Alice in the 1870s

The following day, Alice wrote a much shorter letter to Louis in which she looked forward to their meeting, and hoped that "my letter did not distress you – but it is better to be quite honest about all one's feelings". Despite marital problems, Alice remained a strong supporter of her husband, being highly critical when his abilities or talents were not fully recognised. On 20 March 1877, Louis's father Prince Charles died, making Louis heir presumptive. On 13 June the same year, Charles's older brother Grand Duke Louis III died, and Louis and Alice became the grand duke and duchess of Hesse. Her continued unpopularity in Darmstadt, however, coupled with her mother not wanting her in England, caused strain, and she and her children spent July and August in Houlgate, Normandy, where Louis often visited them. She was hurt by her reputation in Darmstadt, and she became increasingly bitter towards it; Louis wrote in August 1877 expressing the hope that "bitterness of the salt water will drive away the bitterness that you still feel against Darmstadt. Please my darling, don't speak so harshly of it when I come to join you – it would quite spoil my happiness at seeing you again." Alice took Louis's letter to heart, responding: "I shall certainly say nothing to you about Darmstadt when you come...I have no intention of saying anything unpleasant, least of all to you. You shake off anything unpleasant like a poodle shaking off the water when it comes to the sea – natures like yours are the happiest in themselves, but they are not made to help, comfort and advise others, nor to share with others the heat of life's noon-day or the cool of the evening, with insight, understanding and sympathy." In response, Louis sent a letter that "made [Alice] cry", and after this letter, Alice's letters to Louis were more encouraging, assuring him of his ability to make decisions by himself.

Alice and Louis's return to Darmstadt as grand duke and duchess was met with celebration that Alice did not expect. However, she found her duties overwhelming, writing to her mother that she "dreaded everything". Alice used her new role to reform the social conditions of Darmstadt, but found the responsibility of being Landesmutter (mother of her people) strenuous. In another letter to her mother, she wrote that her duties were "more than she could stand in the long run". She was distressed by a rumour that she was once unkind to Louis's aunt, Grand Duchess Mathilde Caroline, and she was hurt by an unkind letter from Queen Victoria. Alice complained to Louis that the letter "made me cry with anger...I wish I were dead and it probably will not be too long before I give Mama that pleasure." However, no mention is made of what provoked this angry outburst.

While she tried to involve herself in the arts and sciences and distance herself from society protocols, she continued to feel the burden of her duties. Christmas 1877 provided respite for Alice, as all the family gathered together again, and she doted on her youngest daughters Alix and Marie. She was too exhausted to attend the wedding of her niece, Princess Charlotte of Prussia, in Berlin, in January 1878. In the Autumn of 1878, Queen Victoria paid for the Grand Ducal family to holiday in Eastbourne, where they stayed in a house on the Grand Parade. Alice performed various royal duties on this trip and visited her mother at Osborne before returning to the New Palace at Darmstadt in late 1878.

== Final illness and death ==
In November 1878, the grand ducal household fell ill with diphtheria. Alice's eldest daughter Victoria was the first to fall ill, complaining of a stiff neck in the evening of 5 November. Diphtheria was diagnosed the following morning, and soon the disease spread to Alice's children Alix, Marie, Irene, and Ernest. Her husband Louis became infected shortly thereafter. Elisabeth was the only child to not fall ill, having been sent away by Alice to the palace of Louis's mother, Princess Charles of Hesse.

Marie became seriously ill on 15 November, and Alice was called to her bedside, but by the time she arrived, Marie had choked to death. A distraught Alice wrote to Queen Victoria that the "pain is beyond words". Alice kept the news of Marie's death secret from her children for several weeks, but she finally told Ernest in early December. His reaction was even worse than she had anticipated; at first he refused to believe it. As he sat up crying, Alice broke her rule about physical contact with the ill and gave him a kiss. At first, however, Alice did not fall ill. She met her sister Victoria as the latter was passing through Darmstadt on the way to England, and wrote to her mother with "a hint of resumed cheerfulness" on the same day. However, by Saturday, 14 December, the anniversary of her father's death, she became seriously ill with the diphtheria caught from her son. Her last words were "dear Papa", and she fell unconscious at 2:30 am. Just after 8:30 am, she died. Alice was buried on 18 December 1878 at the Grand Ducal mausoleum at Rosenhöhe outside Darmstadt, with the Union Flag draped over her coffin. A special monument of Alice and her daughter Marie was erected there by Joseph Boehm.

She was the first child of Queen Victoria to die, with her mother outliving her by more than 20 years. Victoria noted the coincidence of the dates of Albert and Alice's deaths as "almost incredible and most mysterious". Writing in her journal on the day of Alice's death, Queen Victoria referred to the recent sufferings of the family: "This terrible day come round again!" Shocked by grief, she wrote to her daughter Princess Victoria: "My precious child, who stood by me and upheld me seventeen years ago on the same day taken, and by such an awful and fearful disease...She had darling Papa's nature, and much of his self-sacrificing character and fearless and entire devotion to duty!" The animosity that Victoria had towards Alice seemed no longer present. Princess Victoria expressed her grief to her mother in a 39-page letter, and deeply mourned Alice, the sister to whom she was closest. However, both she and her husband were forbidden from attending the funeral by the German Emperor, who was worried about their safety.

Alice's death was felt in both Britain and Hesse. The Times wrote: "The humblest of people felt that they had the kinship of nature with a Princess who was the model of family virtue as a daughter, a sister, a wife and a mother...Her abundant sympathies sought for objects of help in the great unknown waste of human distress". The Illustrated London News wrote that the "lesson of the late Princess's life is as noble as it is obvious. Moral worth is far more important than high position". The death was also heavily felt by the royal family, especially by Alice's brother and sister-in-law, the Prince and Princess of Wales. The Princess of Wales, upon meeting the Queen after Alice's death, exclaimed "I wish I had died instead of her". The Prince, meanwhile, wrote to Earl Granville that Alice "was my favourite sister. So good, so kind, so clever! We had gone through so much together..."

== Legacy ==
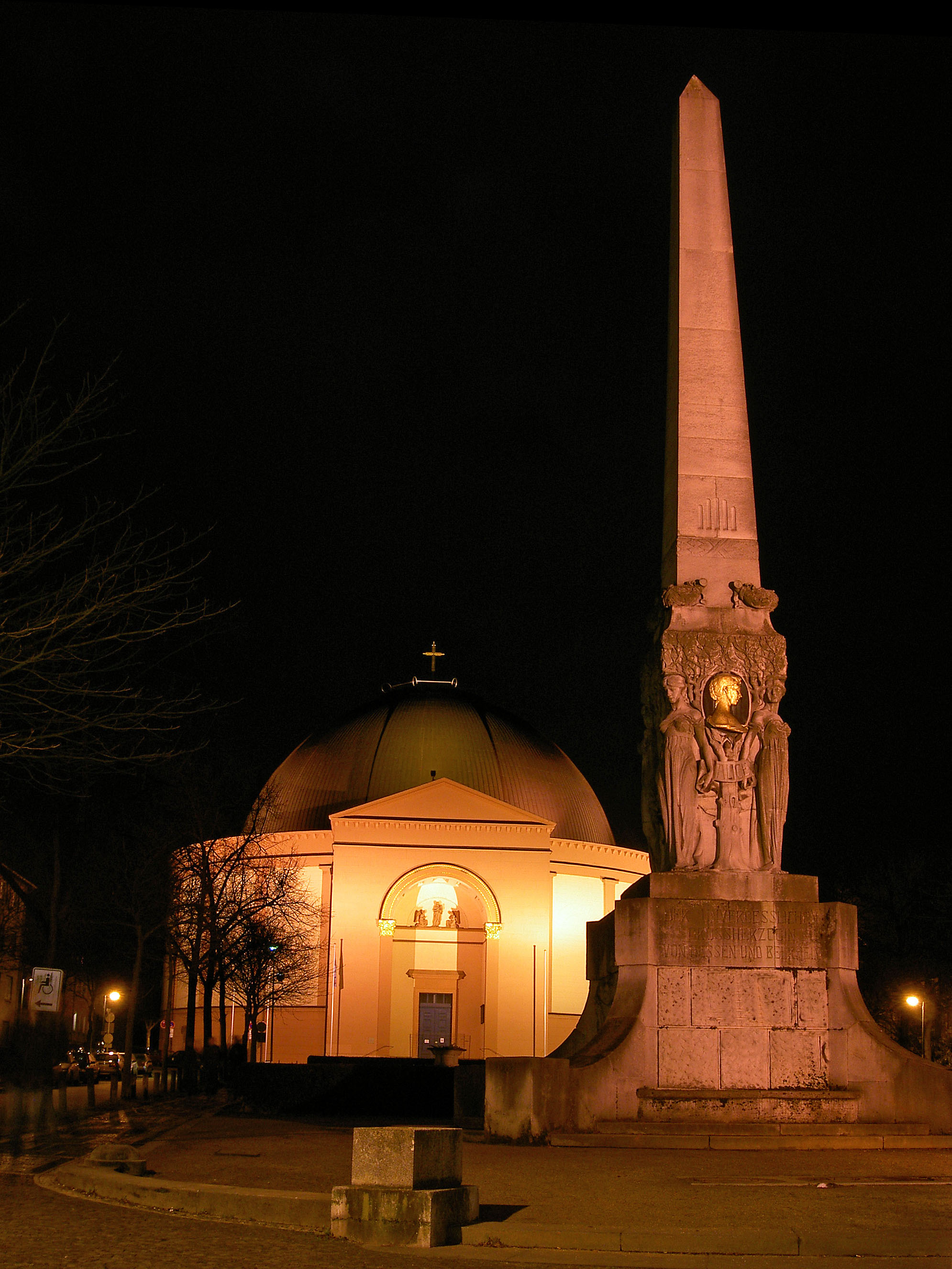
Alice memorial at the Sankt-Ludwigs-Kirche, Darmstadt

Alice founded the Alice-Hospital in Darmstadt in 1869, to treat the city's sick and wounded. The organisation continued to flourish long after Alice's death, and in 1953, her grandson Louis, Earl Mountbatten of Burma gave a lecture on the hospital. He spoke highly of Alice, saying "[for her] the point of departure always remained a human being who was ill and needed help, and his needs in war and peace. At his side stood the person willing to give help, wishing to ameliorate his needs and for this purpose could make use of an organisation which was becoming more and more streamlined." Among Alice's other establishments were the Alice Society for Women's Training and Industry, for the purpose of educating women, and the Princess Alice Women's Guild, an organisation devoted to training nurses. These organisations were especially active and important during the Austro-Prussian war, but the time Alice dedicated to them annoyed her husband, who saw them as consuming his wife's time at his expense.

There are memorials to Alice in Darmstadt, Germany; Whippingham, Isle of Wight; and in the Frogmore Royal Mausoleum, Windsor. In 1879, Queen Victoria erected a memorial to Alice in the form of a Celtic cross, situated in the grounds of Balmoral Castle. It is inscribed 'Her name shall live though now she is no more'.

=== Descendants ===
Alice's descendants went on to play significant roles in world history. Her fourth daughter, Alix, married Tsar Nicholas II of Russia, passing her mother's gene for haemophilia on to her only son, the Tsarevich Alexei. Alix, her husband, and her children were killed by the Bolsheviks in the city of Ekaterinburg in the summer of 1918, sixteen months after the February Revolution forced Nicholas to abdicate. Alice's second daughter, Elizabeth, who had married Grand Duke Sergei Alexandrovich of Russia, and had become a nun after his assassination in 1905, met a similar fate, being killed by the Bolsheviks the day after the former tsar and tsaritsa. Louis Mountbatten, son of Alice's eldest daughter, Victoria, was the last Viceroy of India. He was assassinated by the IRA in 1979. Prince Philip of Greece and Denmark, her great-grandson through Victoria's daughter Princess Alice of Battenberg, married Elizabeth II of the United Kingdom.

== Honours ==
- 1 January 1878: Companion of the Order of the Crown of India
- 26 June 1871: Cross of Merit for Women and Girls
- Dame of the Order of Louise, 1st Division
- (Russian Empire) 1864: Grand Cross of the Imperial Order of Saint Catherine

=== Arms ===
In 1858, Alice and the three younger of her sisters were granted use of the royal arms, with an inescutcheon of the shield of Saxony, representing her father. The shield is differenced by a label argent of three points, demonstrating that she is the child of a monarch; the outer points bore an ermine spot each, and the centre bore a rose gules, to differentiate her from other members of the royal family.

Complete arms of Alice as a princess of the United Kingdom

Shield of Alice as a princess of the United Kingdom

== Issue ==
Name	Birth	Death	Notes	Ref(s)
Victoria Alberta Elisabeth Mathilde Marie	5 April 1863	24 September 1950	m. 30 April 1884 Prince Louis of Battenberg, later Marquess of Milford Haven (24 May 1854 – 11 September 1921); 2 sons, 2 daughters (including Queen Louise of Sweden).	
Elisabeth Alexandra Luise Alix	1 November 1864	18 July 1918 †	Took the name Elizabeth Feodorovna upon her baptism into the Russian Orthodox Church, m. 15 June 1884 Grand Duke Sergei Alexandrovich of Russia (11 May 1857 – 17 February 1905), the seventh child and fifth son of Tsar Alexander II of Russia; had no issue.	
Irene Louise Marie Anne	11 July 1866	11 November 1953	m. 24 May 1888, her first cousin Prince Henry of Prussia, (14 August 1862 – 20 April 1929), son of Frederick III, German Emperor; 3 sons. Irene passed haemophilia on to two of her three sons: Prince Waldemar of Prussia and Prince Henry of Prussia.	
Ernest Louis Charles Albert William	25 November 1868	9 October 1937	Succeeded as Grand Duke of Hesse and by Rhine, 13 March 1892; ousted by revolution, 9 November 1918; m. (1), 9 April 1894 his first cousin HRH Princess Victoria Melita of Saxe-Coburg and Gotha (25 November 1876 – 2 March 1936); 1 son (stillborn) and 1 daughter, div. 21 December 1901. m. (2), 2 February 1905, HH Princess Eleonore of Solms-Hohensolms-Lich (17 September 1871 – 16 November 1937); 2 sons.	
Friedrich William Augustus Victor Leopold Louis	7 October 1870	29 May 1873	Suffered from haemophilia and died from internal bleeding after a fall from a window at the age of two and a half.	
Alix Viktoria Helene Luise Beatrix	6 June 1872	17 July 1918 †	Took the name Alexandra Feodorovna on her baptism into the Russian Orthodox Church, m. 26 November 1894 Tsar Nicholas II of Russia (18 May 1868 – 17 July 1918 †); 1 son and 4 daughters. Their only son, Tsarevich Alexei Nikolaevich of Russia, suffered from haemophilia.	
Marie Victoria Feodore Leopoldine	24 May 1874	16 November 1878	Died from diphtheria at age four.	
† murdered by Bolshevik revolutionaries				

== Ancestors ==
Ancestors of Princess Alice of the United Kingdom

8. Francis, Duke of Saxe-Coburg-Saalfeld (= 14)
4. Ernest I, Duke of Saxe-Coburg and Gotha
9. Countess Augusta Reuss of Ebersdorf (= 15)
2. Prince Albert of Saxe-Coburg and Gotha
10. Augustus, Duke of Saxe-Gotha-Altenburg
5. Princess Louise of Saxe-Gotha-Altenburg
11. Duchess Louise Charlotte of Mecklenburg-Schwerin
1. Alice, Grand Duchess of Hesse and by Rhine
12. George III
6. Prince Edward, Duke of Kent and Strathearn
13. Charlotte of Mecklenburg-Strelitz
3. Victoria of the United Kingdom
14. Francis, Duke of Saxe-Coburg-Saalfeld (= 8)
7. Princess Victoria of Saxe-Coburg-Saalfeld
15. Countess Augusta Reuss of Ebersdorf (= 9)

== Citations and references ==
=== References ===
- Alice, Grand Duchess of Hesse (1885). Letters to Her Majesty the Queen. London: John Murray.
- Longford, Elizabeth (1964). Victoria R.I.. London: Weidenfeld & Nicolson. ISBN 0-297-17001-5.
- Mager, Hugo (1998). Elizabeth: Grand Duchess of Russia. New York, USA: Carroll and Graf Publishers, Inc. ISBN 0-7867-0678-3.
- Noel, Gerard (1985). Princess Alice: Queen Victoria's forgotten daughter. London: Constable and Company Limited. ISBN 0-09-465980-X.
- Packard, Jerrold M. (1998). Victoria's Daughters. New York: St. Martin's Griffin. ISBN 0-312-24496-7.
- Martin, Theodore (1908). Queen Victoria as I knew her. W. Blackwood.
- Pakula, Hannah (1995). An Uncommon Woman: The Empress Frederick. London: Phoenix Press. ISBN 1-84212-623-7.
- Van der Kiste, John (2003) [1986]. Queen Victoria's Children. Gloucestershire, England: Sutton Publishing Limited. ISBN 0-7509-3476-X.

Princess Alice of the United Kingdom House of Saxe-Coburg and Gotha Cadet branch of the House of Wettin Born: 25 April 1843 Died: 14 December 1878
German royalty
Vacant Title last held by Mathilde Caroline of Bavaria	Grand Duchess consort of Hesse and by Rhine; 13 June 1877 – 14 December 1878	Vacant Title next held by Victoria Melita of Saxe-Coburg and Gotha
