= Prince Friedrich of Hesse and by Rhine =

German prince (1870–1873)

Prince Friedrich
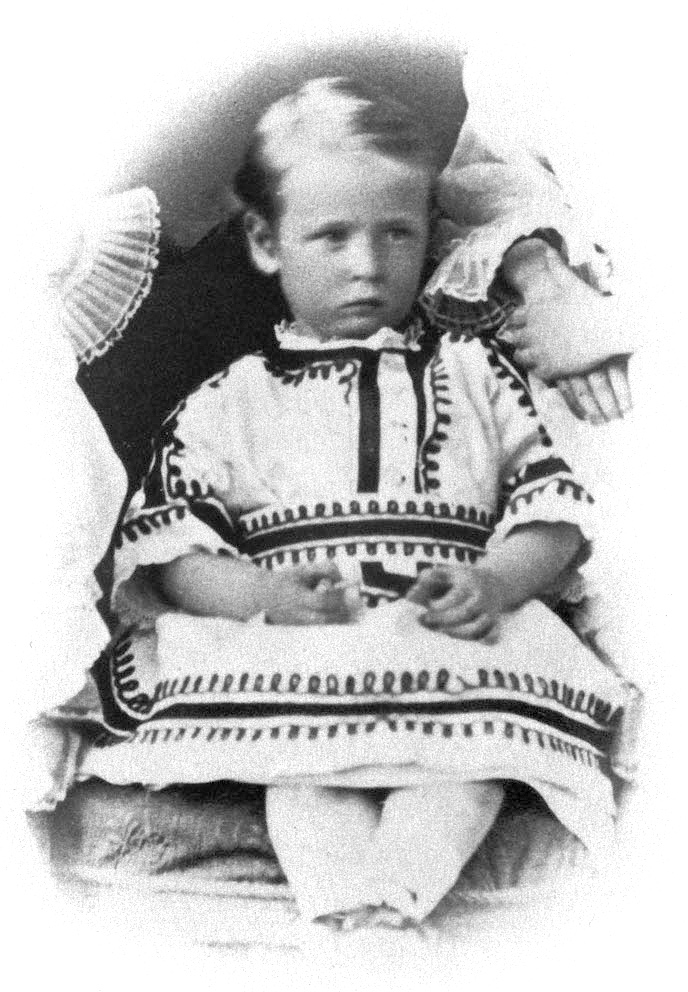
- Prince Friedrich, April 1873.
- Born: 7 October 1870; New Palace, Darmstadt, Grand Duchy of Hesse and by Rhine
- Died: 29 May 1873 (aged 2); New Palace, Darmstadt, Grand Duchy of Hesse and by Rhine, German Empire
Names
- Friedrich Wilhelm August Victor Leopold Ludwig
- House: Hesse-Darmstadt
- Father: Louis IV, Grand Duke of Hesse
- Mother: Princess Alice of the United Kingdom
- Religion: Lutheran

Prince Friedrich of Hesse and by Rhine (Friedrich Wilhelm August Victor Leopold Ludwig; 7 October 1870 – 29 May 1873) was a son of Louis IV, Grand Duke of Hesse, and Princess Alice of the United Kingdom, and was the grandson of Queen Victoria. He was the maternal great-uncle of Prince Philip, Duke of Edinburgh, through his eldest sister, Princess Victoria of Hesse and by Rhine.

== Life ==
Friedrich was born on 7 October, 1870 at New Palace in Darmstadt. He was the second son and fifth child of Louis IV, Grand Duke of Hesse and Princess Alice of the United Kingdom, then Prince and Princess Louis of Hesse and by Rhine. Friedrich was a maternal grandchild of Queen Victoria and Prince Albert of Saxe-Coburg and Gotha.

Friedrich, called Frittie by his family, was a cheerful and lively child, and loved especially by his mother. He was named Friedrich Wilhelm August Victor Leopold Ludwig, with homages including to his maternal grandmother and father. Leopold was added as one of his names in honour of his maternal uncle, Prince Leopold, Duke of Albany. Prince Leopold, who was Friedrich's godfather, had the blood disorder haemophilia.

His siblings included Viktoria, Elisabeth, Irene, Ernst Ludwig, Alix and Marie of Hesse and by Rhine. Through his eldest sister Victoria, Friedrich was the maternal grand-uncle of Prince Philip, Duke of Edinburgh and through his younger sister Alix, he was the maternal uncle of the last four Grand Duchesses Olga, Tatiana, Maria, Anastasia and Alexei Nikolaevich, Tsarevich of Russia.

Friedrich was diagnosed with haemophilia in February 1873. He had fallen while playing and cut his ear, which led to three days of bleeding. Bandages could not stanch the flow of blood, and the diagnosis came shortly after. His namesake and godfather, Prince Leopold, also had haemophilia.

== Death ==
On 29 May 1873, Friedrich and his older brother, Ernst, were playing together in their mother's bedroom. Ernst ran to another room, which was set at right angles to Alice's bedroom and peered through the window at his younger brother. Alice ran to get Ernst away from the window. When she was out of the room, Friedrich climbed onto a chair next to an open window in his mother's bedroom to get a closer look at his brother. The chair tipped over and Friedrich tumbled through the window, falling 20 feet (6.1 m) to the balustrade below. He survived the fall and might have lived had he not had haemophilia. He died hours later of a brain hemorrhage.

== Aftermath ==
Following Friedrich's death, his distraught mother often prayed at his grave and marked anniversaries of small events in his life. His brother, Ernst, told his mother that he wanted all of the family to die together, not alone "like Frittie". Two of Friedrich's sisters, Irene and Alix, also had sons with haemophilia. Irene's son, Prince Henry of Prussia (1900-1904), whom was Friedrich’s nephew, also died of complications from a fall relating to haemophilia, aged four.
