= Schloss Hemmelmark =

Historic house in Barkelsby, Germany

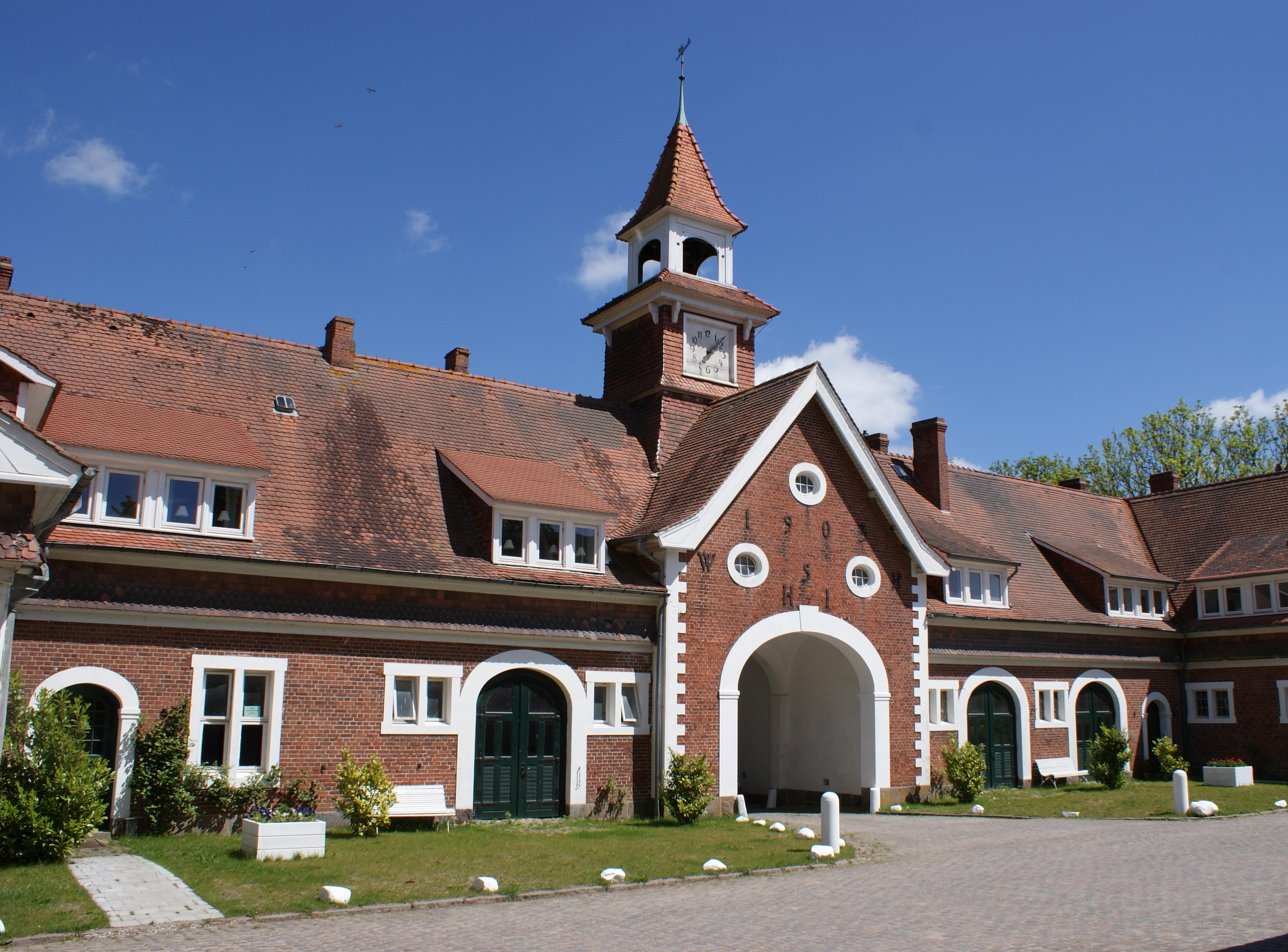
- Gatehouse of Schloss Hemmelmark

- Location within Schleswig-Holstein

General information
- Type: Manor house (Gut)
- Location: Barkelsby, Schleswig-Holstein, Germany
- Coordinates: 54.4950°N 10.0005°E
- Construction started: 1903
- Completed: 1904

Schloss Hemmelmark (also known as Gut Hemmelmark) is a historic manor house and former noble estate in the Municipality of Barkelsby near Eckernförde in Schleswig-Holstein, Germany. The estate is situated near the Hemmelmarker See, part of a Natura 2000 protected area.

== History ==
The estate of Hemmelmark originally belonged to the Schleswig-Holstein noble family of Sehestedt in the Middle Ages. In 1527, it was temporarily confiscated by the Danish Crown before later being restored to the family.

In 1894, the property was purchased by Prince Heinrich of Prussia as a private country residence. Between 1903 and 1904, the old manor was replaced with a new building designed in the English country house style by court architect Ernst von Ihne.

After Prince Heinrich's death in 1929, his widow Princess Irene of Hesse continued to live at Schloss Hemmelmark until her death in 1953.

From 1959 to 1972, the mansion served as a boarding school operated by the Johanniterorden (Order of Saint John).

== Architecture ==
The manor house, built in 1904, reflects early 20th-century country-house architecture and forms the centre of a large rural estate with parkland, woodland, and agricultural outbuildings.

Several structures on the estate including the manor house, the gatehouse, and the "Victoria House" (Meierei) are listed as protected cultural monuments in the heritage register of Kreis Rendsburg-Eckernförde.

== Surroundings ==
The nearby Hemmelmarker See covers approximately 82 hectares and reaches a depth of around 6.2 metres. It formed when a former coastal bay was cut off from the Baltic Sea.

The surrounding landscape including wetlands, woodland, and dune habitats has been part of the FFH (Natura 2000) protected area "Hemmelmarker See" since 2004.

== Later use ==
In the late 20th and early 21st centuries, the estate remained in private ownership and has occasionally been used as a film location.
