= Princess Irene of Hesse and by Rhine =

Princess Henry of Prussia (1866–1953)

Irene of Hesse and by Rhine
- Princess Henry of Prussia
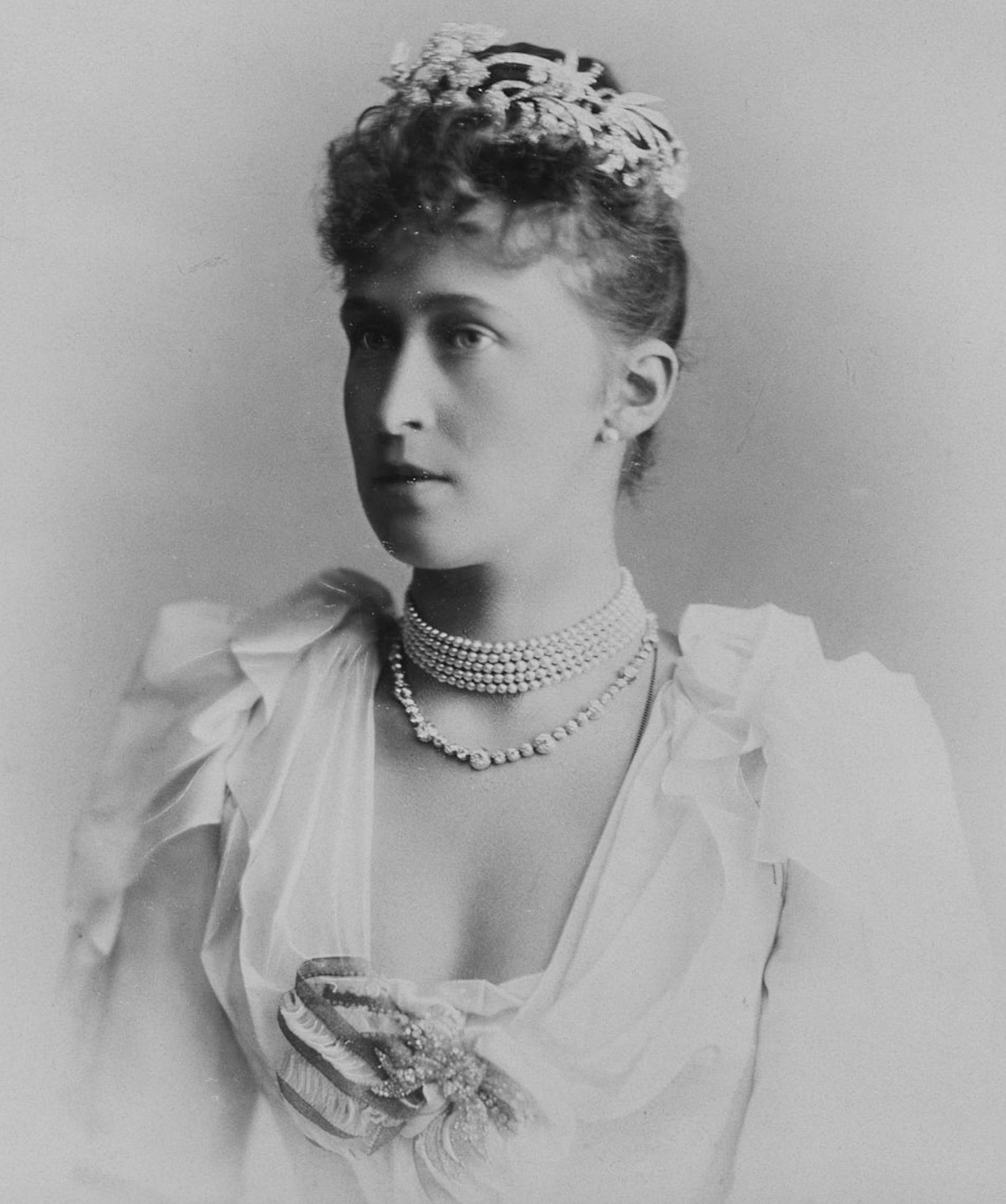
- Born: 11 July 1866; New Palace, Darmstadt, Grand Duchy of Hesse, German Empire
- Died: 11 November 1953 (aged 87); Schloss Hemmelmark, Barkelsby, Schleswig-Holstein, West Germany
- Burial: 15 November 1953; Schloss Hemmelmark, Barkelsby, Schleswig-Holstein, Germany
- Spouse: Prince Henry of Prussia (m. 1888; died 1929)
- Issue: Prince Waldemar; Prince Sigismund; Prince Henry
Names
- Irène Luise Marie Anne
- House: Hesse-Darmstadt
- Father: Louis IV, Grand Duke of Hesse and by Rhine
- Mother: Princess Alice of the United Kingdom

Princess Irene of Hesse and by Rhine (Irène Luise Marie Anne; 11 July 1866 – 11 November 1953), later Princess Henry of Prussia, was the third child and third daughter of Princess Alice of the United Kingdom and Louis IV, Grand Duke of Hesse and by Rhine. Her maternal grandparents were Queen Victoria and Prince Albert of Saxe-Coburg and Gotha. Her paternal grandparents were Prince Charles of Hesse and by Rhine and Princess Elisabeth of Prussia. She was the wife of Prince Henry of Prussia, a younger brother of Wilhelm II, German Emperor and her first cousin. The SS Prinzessin Irene, a liner of the North German Lloyd was named after her.

Her siblings included Princess Victoria of Hesse and by Rhine, wife of Prince Louis of Battenberg, Grand Duchess Elizabeth Feodorovna of Russia, wife of Grand Duke Sergei Alexandrovich of Russia, Ernest Louis, Grand Duke of Hesse and by Rhine, and Empress Alexandra Feodorovna of Russia, wife of Tsar Nicholas II of Russia. Like her younger sister, the empress, Irene was a carrier of the hemophilia gene, and Irene would lose her sisters Alix and Elisabeth in Russia to the Bolsheviks.

== Early life ==
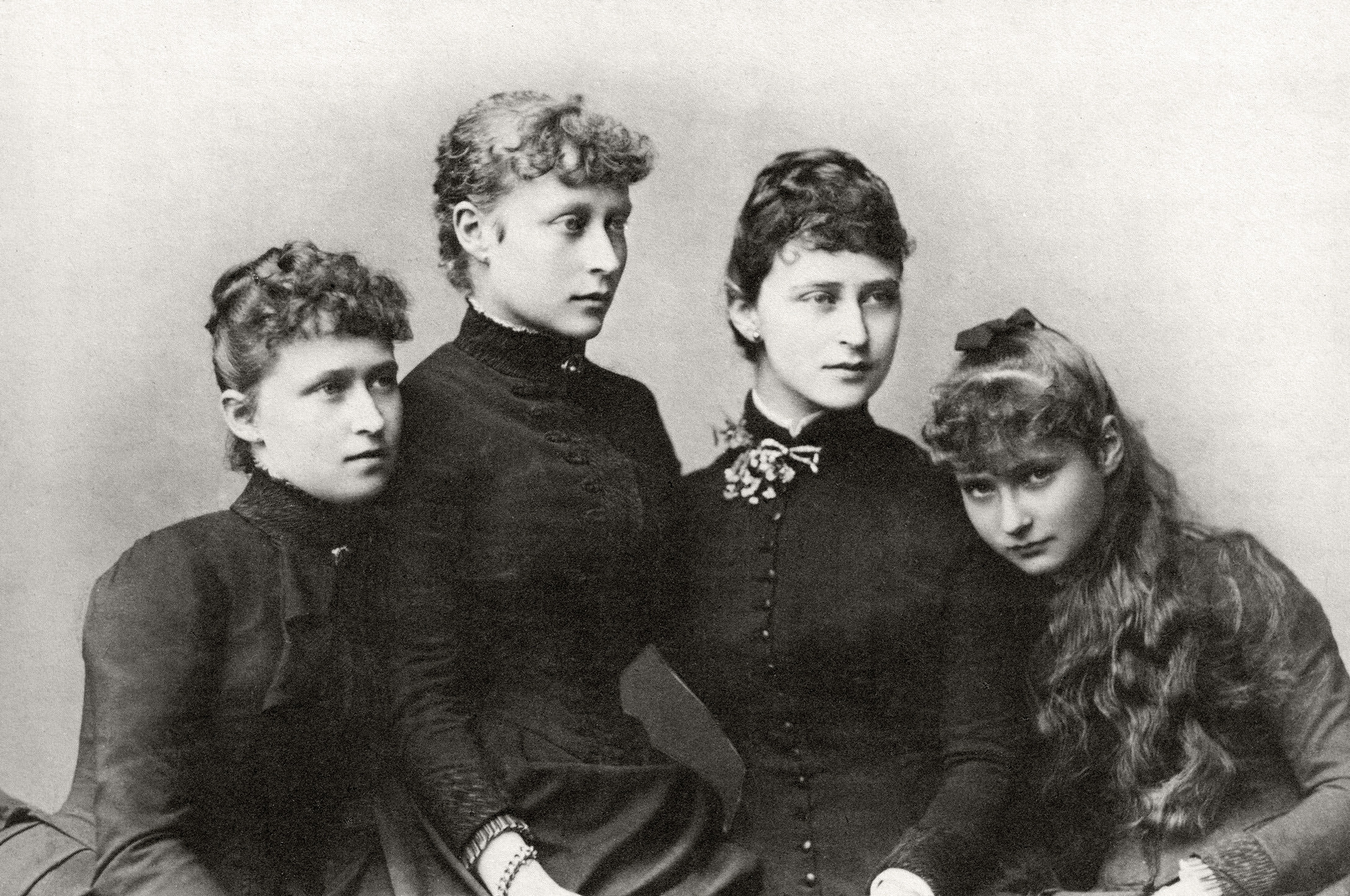
Princesses Irene, Victoria, Elisabeth and Alix of Hesse in 1885

She received her first name, which was taken from the Greek word for "peace", because she was born at the end of the Austro-Prussian War. She was nicknamed "Nin" by her family. Queen Victoria considered Irene an unattractive child and once wrote to her daughter Victoria that Irene was "not pretty". She would never be considered a great beauty like her sisters Elisabeth and Alix, but she did have a pleasant, even disposition. Princess Alice brought up her daughters simply. An English nanny presided over the nursery and the children ate plain meals of rice puddings and baked apples and wore plain dresses. Her daughters were taught how to do housework, such as baking cakes, making their own beds, laying fires and sweeping and dusting their rooms. Princess Alice also emphasised the need to give to the poor and often took her daughters on visits to hospitals and charities.

The family was devastated in 1873 when Irene's haemophiliac younger brother Friedrich, nicknamed "Frittie", fell through an open window, struck his head on the balustrade and died hours later of a brain hemorrhage. In the months following the toddler's death, Alice frequently took her children to his grave to pray and was melancholy on anniversaries associated with him. In the autumn of 1878 Irene, her siblings (except for Elisabeth) and her father became ill with diphtheria. Her younger sister Princess Marie, nicknamed "May", died of the disease. Her mother, exhausted from nursing the children, also became infected. Knowing she was in danger of dying, Princess Alice dictated her will, including instructions about how to bring up her daughters and how to run the household. She died of diphtheria on 14 December 1878.

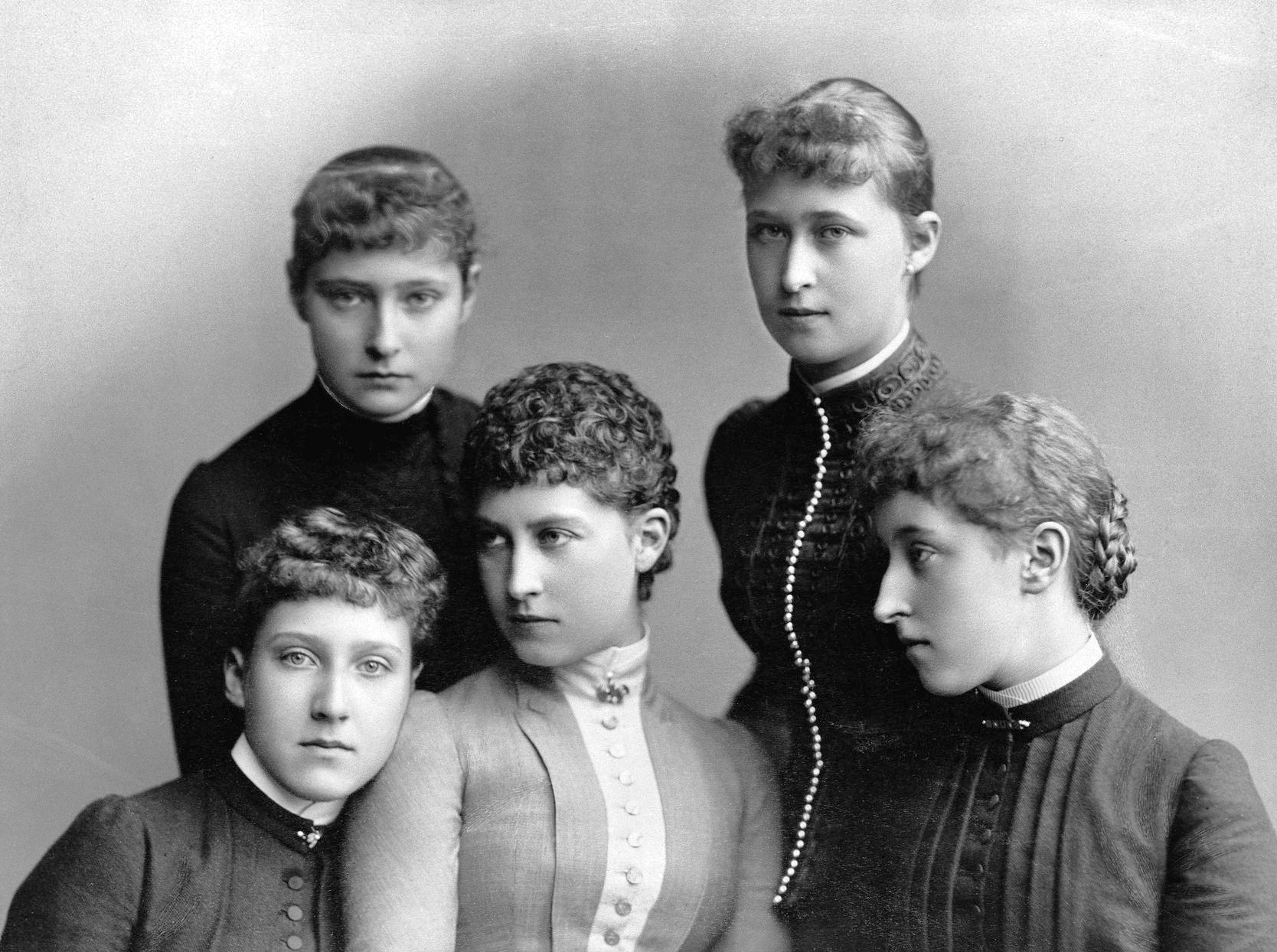
From left to right (back row): Irene's sister Alix, and Irene (front row), Irene's cousins Marie Louise, Charlotte, and Helena Victoria in 1885

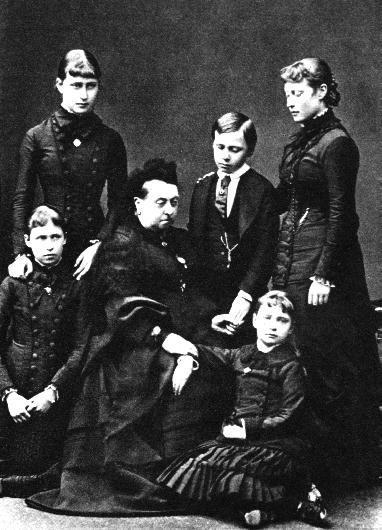
Princess Irene of Hesse and by Rhine, kneeling at left, with her grandmother Queen Victoria and, from left to right, her sister Elisabeth, brother Ernest Louis, sister Victoria and, sitting, her sister Alix in February 1879, two months after the deaths of her mother and sister Marie

Following Alice's death, Queen Victoria resolved to act as a mother to her Hessian grandchildren. Princess Irene and her surviving siblings spent annual holidays in England and their grandmother sent instructions to their governess regarding their education and approving the pattern of their dresses. With her sister Alix, Irene was a bridesmaid at the 1885 wedding of their maternal aunt, Princess Beatrice, to Prince Henry of Battenberg.

== Marriage ==
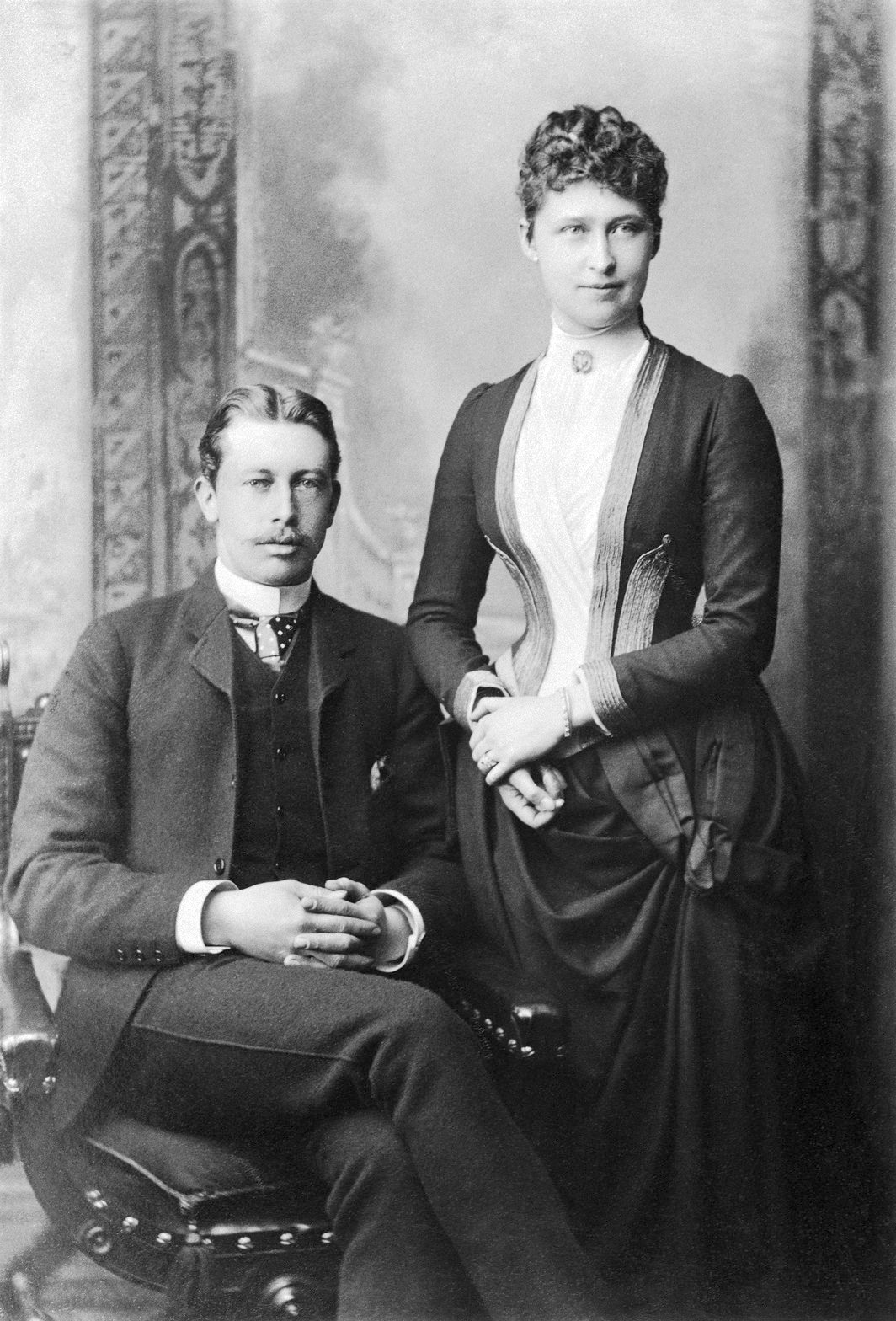
Irene of Hesse and Henry of Prussia, 1887

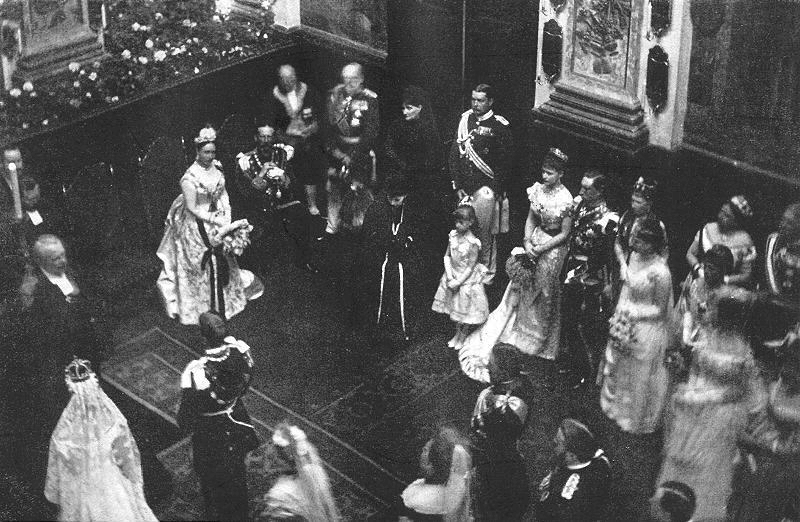
Wedding, 1888

Irene married her first cousin Prince Henry of Prussia, the third child and second son of Frederick III, German Emperor and Victoria, Princess Royal, on 24 May 1888 at the chapel of the Charlottenburg Palace in Berlin. As their mothers were sisters, Irene and Henry were first cousins. Their marriage displeased Queen Victoria because she had not been told about the courtship until they had already decided to marry. At the time of the ceremony, Irene's uncle and father-in-law, the German emperor, was dying of throat cancer, and less than a month after the ceremony, Irene's cousin and brother-in-law ascended the throne as Kaiser Wilhelm II. Heinrich's mother, Empress Victoria, was fond of Irene. However, Empress Victoria was shocked because Irene did not wear a shawl or scarf to disguise her pregnancy when she was pregnant with her first son, the haemophiliac Prince Waldemar, in 1889. Empress Victoria, who was fascinated by politics and current events, also couldn't understand why Heinrich and Irene never read a newspaper. However, the couple were happily married and they were known as "The Very Amiables" by their relatives because of their pleasant natures. The marriage produced three sons.

=== Children ===
Name	Birth	Death
Prince Waldemar Wilhelm Ludwig Friedrich Viktor Heinrich of Prussia	20 March 1889	2 May 1945
Prince Wilhelm Viktor Karl August Heinrich Sigismund of Prussia	27 November 1896	14 November 1978
Prince Heinrich Viktor Ludwig Friedrich of Prussia	9 January 1900	26 February 1904

== Family relationships ==
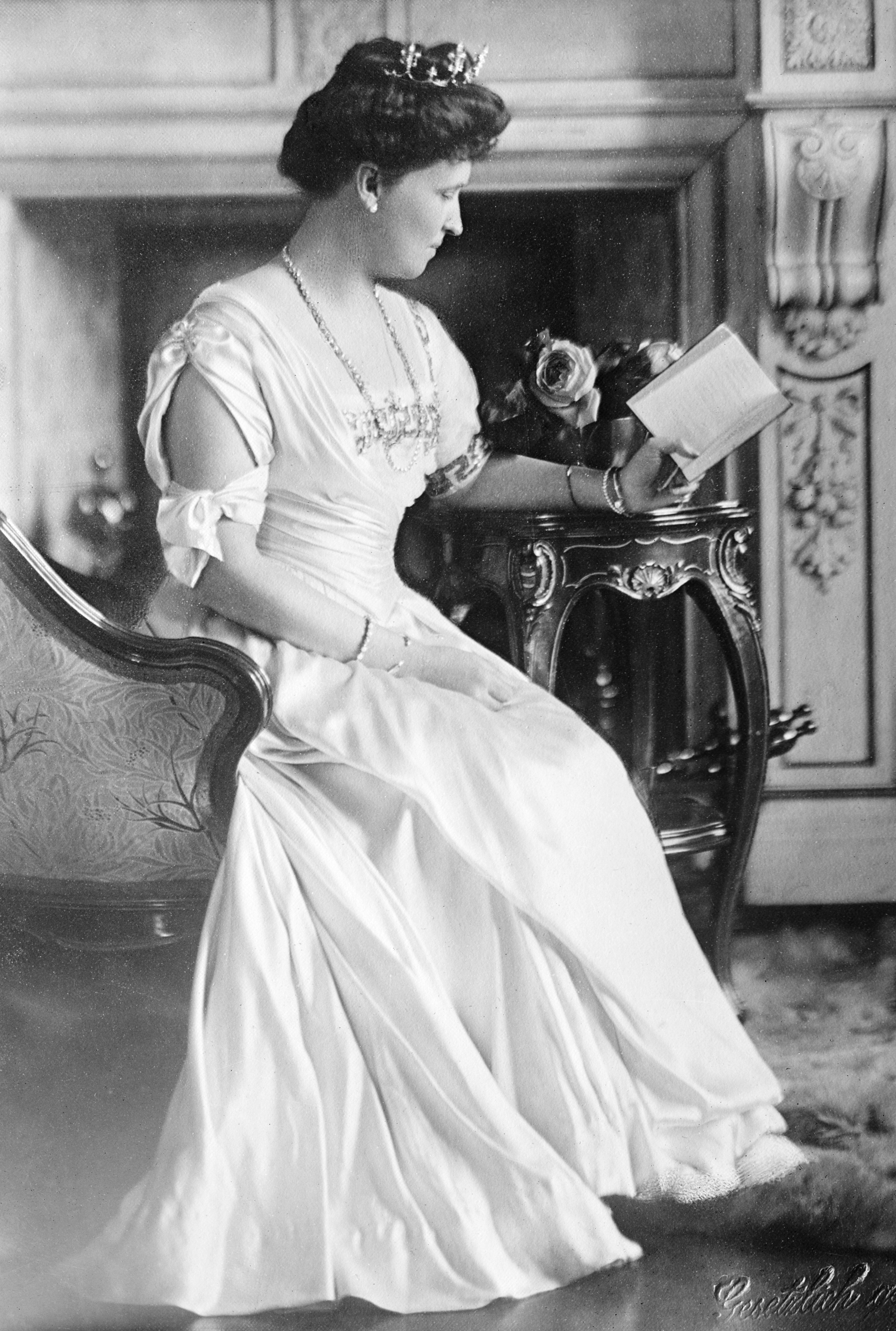
Princess Irene of Prussia, ca. 1902

Irene transmitted the haemophilia gene to her eldest and youngest sons, Waldemar and Heinrich. Waldemar's health worried her from early childhood. She was later devastated when the youngest child, four-year-old Heinrich, died after he fell and bumped his head in February 1904. Six months after little Heinrich's death, Irene became an aunt to Tsarevich Alexei of Russia, son of her youngest sister, Tsarina Alexandra, who also had hemophilia.

Irene, raised to believe in a proper Victorian code of behaviour, was easily shocked by what she saw as immorality. In 1884, the same year that her elder sister Victoria married Prince Louis of Battenberg, another sister, Elisabeth, married Grand Duke Sergei Alexandrovich of Russia, and when Elisabeth converted from Lutheranism to Russian Orthodoxy, in 1891, Irene was deeply upset. She wrote to her father that she "cried terribly" over Elisabeth’s decision. In 1892, Irene's father, Grand Duke Louis IV, died, and her brother, Ernest, succeeded him as Grand Duke of Hesse. Two years later, in May 1894, Ernest Louis was married off by Queen Victoria to a first cousin, Victoria Melita of Saxe-Coburg-Gotha. It was amidst the wedding festivities that Irene's youngest surviving sister, Alix, accepted the marriage proposal of Tsarevich Nicholas, a second cousin, and when Nicholas' father died prematurely in November 1894, Irene and her husband travelled to St. Petersburg to be present at both his funeral and the wedding of Alix, who had taken the name Alexandra Feodorovna upon her conversion to Orthodoxy, to the new tsar, Nicholas II. Despite the disagreement that she had over the conversion of two of her sisters to Russian Orthodoxy, she remained close with all of her siblings. In 1907, Irene helped arrange what later turned out to be a disastrous marriage between Elisabeth’s ward, Grand Duchess Maria Pavlovna of Russia, to Prince Vilhelm, Duke of Södermanland. Wilhelm's mother, the Queen of Sweden, was an old friend of both Irene and Elisabeth. Grand Duchess Maria later wrote that Irene pressured her to go through with the marriage when she had doubts. She told Maria that ending the engagement would "kill" Elisabeth. In 1912, Irene was a source of support to her sister Alix when Alexei nearly died of complications of haemophilia at the Imperial Family's hunting lodge in Poland.

== Later life ==
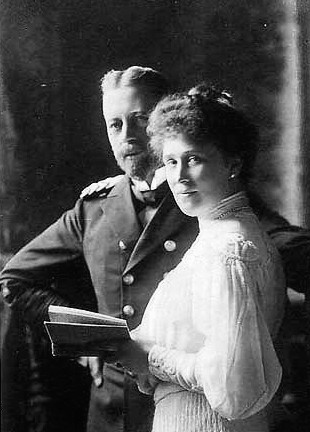
Prince Henry and Princess Irene of Prussia

Irene's ties to her sisters were disrupted by the advent of World War I, which put them on opposing sides of the war. When the war ended, she received word that Alix, her husband and children and her sister Elizabeth had been killed by the Bolsheviks.

When Anna Anderson surfaced in Berlin in the early 1920s, claiming to be the surviving Grand Duchess Anastasia Nikolaevna of Russia, Irene visited the woman, but decided that Anderson could not be the niece she had last seen in 1913. Princess Irene was not impressed.

"I saw immediately that she could not be one of my nieces. Even though I had not seen them for nine years, the fundamental facial characteristics could not have altered to that degree, in particular the position of the eyes, the ear, etc. .. At first sight one could perhaps detect a resemblance to Grand Duchess Tatiana."

Grand Duchess Olga Alexandrovna, sister of the murdered tsar, commented on the visit of Princess Irene,

"It was an unsatisfactory meeting, but the woman's supporters said that Princess Irene had not known her niece very well and all the rest of it."

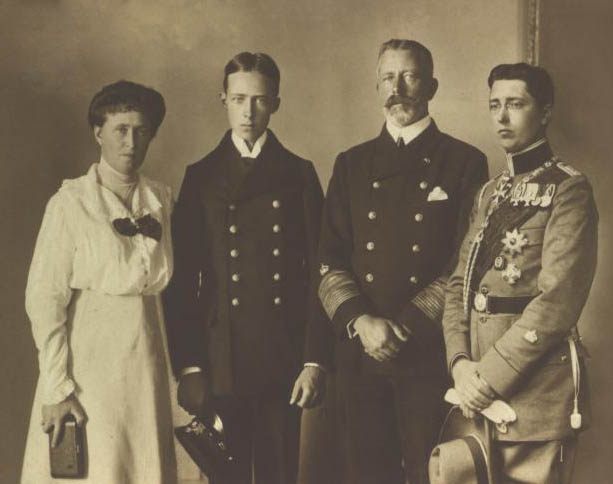
Princess Irene with her husband, Prince Heinrich of Prussia, and their two surviving sons, Prince Sigismund, left, and Prince Waldemar

Irene's husband, Heinrich, said that the mention of Anderson upset Irene too much and ordered that no one was to discuss Anderson in his presence. Heinrich died in 1929. Anna Anderson biographer Peter Kurth wrote that several years later, Irene's son (Prince Sigismund) posed questions to Anderson through an intermediary about their shared childhood and declared that her answers were all accurate. Irene later adopted Sigismund's daughter, Barbara, born in 1920, as her heir after Sigismund left Germany to live in Costa Rica during the 1930s. Sigismund declined to return to Germany to live after World War II.

At the time of her death, Irene was the last surviving child of Princess Alice and Prince Louis of Hesse. Irene died on November 11, 1953 in Gut Hemmelmark Her granddaughter, Barbara was at her grandmother's bedside when she died. Irene was officially buried on 15 November in the chapel of Schloss Hemmelmark, next to her husband and youngest son.

== Honours ==
- Grand Duchy of Hesse: Dame of the Grand Ducal Hessian Order of the Golden Lion, 21 March 1883
- Kingdom of Prussia:
  - Dame of the Order of Louise, 1st Division
  - Dame of the Wilhelm-Orden
  - Red Cross Medal, 1st Class, 22 October 1898
- Kingdom of Bavaria: Merit Cross for Volunteer Nurses
- (Austrian Empire) (Kingdom of Hungary) Austria-Hungary: Grand Cross of the Imperial Austrian Order of Elizabeth, 1900
- Russian Empire: Grand Cross of the Imperial Order of Saint Catherine
- United Kingdom:
  - Queen Victoria Golden Jubilee Medal, 1887
  - Royal Order of Victoria and Albert, 2nd Class

== Ancestry ==
Ancestors of Princess Irene of Hesse and by Rhine

8. Louis II, Grand Duke of Hesse
4. Prince Karl of Hesse and by Rhine
9. Princess Wilhelmine of Baden
2. Louis IV, Grand Duke of Hesse
10. Prince Wilhelm of Prussia (1783–1851)
5. Princess Elizabeth of Prussia
11. Princess Maria Anna of Hesse-Homburg
1. Princess Irene of Hesse and by Rhine
12. Ernest I, Duke of Saxe-Coburg and Gotha
6. Prince Albert of Saxe-Coburg and Gotha
13. Princess Louise of Saxe-Gotha-Altenburg
3. Princess Alice of the United Kingdom
14. Prince Edward Augustus, Duke of Kent and Strathearn
7. Queen Victoria
15. Princess Victoria of Saxe-Coburg-Saalfeld

== Books and articles ==
- Kurth, Peter (1983). Anastasia: The Riddle of Anna Anderson. Little, Brown, and Company. ISBN 0-316-50717-2.
- Grand Duchess Marie (1930). Education of a Princess: A Memoir. Viking Press.
- Mager, Hugo (1998). Elizabeth: Grand Duchess of Russia. Carroll and Graf Publishers, Inc. ISBN 0-7867-0678-3
- Massie, Robert K. (1995). The Romanovs: The Final Chapter. Random House. ISBN 0-394-58048-6
- Mironenko, Sergei, and Maylunas, Andrei (1997). A Lifelong Passion: Nicholas and Alexandra: Their Own Story. Doubleday. ISBN 0-385-48673-1.
- Pakula, Hannah (1995). An Uncommon Woman: The Empress Frederick: Daughter of Queen Victoria, Wife of the Crown Prince of Prussia, Mother of Kaiser Wilhelm. Simon and Schuster. ISBN 0-684-84216-5.
- Queen Victoria (1975). Advice to my granddaughter: Letters from Queen Victoria to Princess Victoria of Hesse. Simon and Schuster. ISBN 0-671-22242-2
- Vorres, I, The Last Grand Duchess: Her Imperial Highness Grand Duchess Olga Alexandrovna, Charles Scribner's Sonss, New York, 1964.
