= Prince Henry of Prussia (born 1862) =

Prussian prince and admiral

Prince Heinrich of Prussia
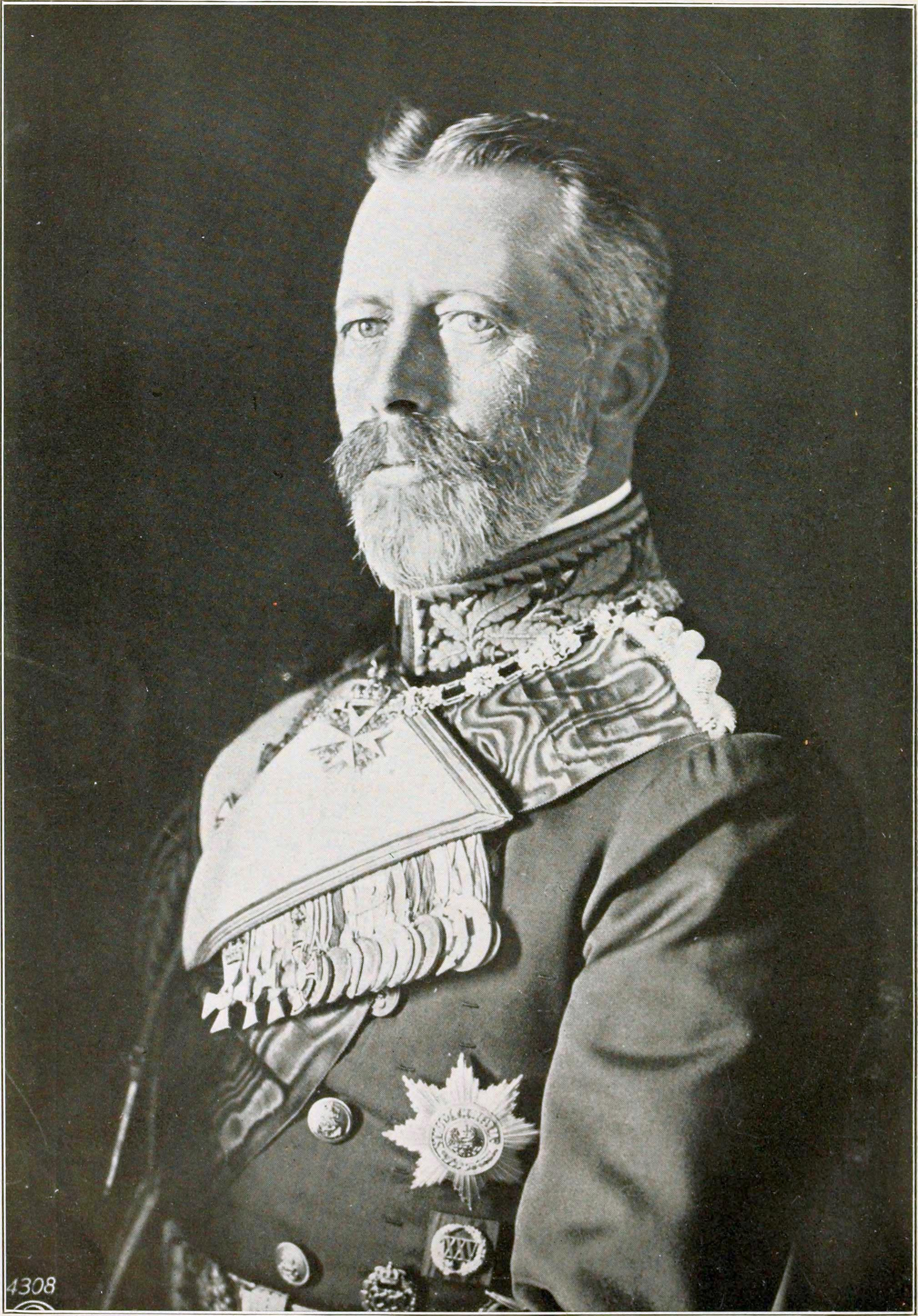
- Photograph by Ernest Flagg, 1914
- Born: 14 August 1862; Berlin, Kingdom of Prussia, German Confederation
- Died: 20 April 1929 (aged 66); Schloss Hemmelmark, Barkelsby, Schleswig-Holstein, Weimar Republic
- Burial: 24 April 1929; Schloss Hemmelmark, Barkelsby, Schleswig-Holstein, Germany
- Spouse: Princess Irene of Hesse and by Rhine (m. 1888)
- Issue: Prince Waldemar: Prince Sigismund; Prince Henry
Names
- German: Albert Wilhelm Heinrich; English: Albert William Henry
- House: Hohenzollern
- Father: Frederick III, German Emperor
- Mother: Victoria, Princess Royal
- Military career
- Allegiance: Kingdom of Prussia; German Empire
- Branch: Imperial German Navy
- Service years: 1872–1919
- Rank: Großadmiral (grand admiral)
- Commands: 1st Torpedo Boat Division; SMY Hohenzollern; SMS Irene; SMS Beowulf; SMS Sachsen; SMS Wörth; 2nd Divsion, 1st Battle Squadron; 2nd Division, Cruiser Squadron; Cruiser Squadron; 1st Battle Squadron; Baltic Naval Station; High Seas Fleet; Inspector General of the Navy; Baltic Fleet
- Awards: Order of the Black Eagle; Pour le Merite with Oak leaves

Prince Heinrich of Prussia (German: Albert Wilhelm Heinrich; 14 August 1862 – 20 April 1929) was a younger brother of German Emperor and King of Prussia Wilhelm II and a Prince of Prussia. Through his mother, he was also a grandson of Queen Victoria. A career naval officer, he held various commands in the Imperial German Navy and eventually rose to the rank of Grand Admiral and the office of Inspector General of the Navy.

== Biography ==
Born in Berlin, Prince Heinrich was the third child and second son of eight children born to Crown Prince Frederick William (later Emperor Frederick III), and Victoria, Princess Royal (later Empress Victoria and in widowhood Empress Frederick), eldest daughter of the British Queen Victoria. Henry was three years younger than his brother, the future Emperor William II (born 27 January 1859). He was born on the same day as King Frederick William I "Soldier-King" of Prussia.

After attending the gymnasium in Kassel, which he left in the middle grades in 1877, the 15-year-old Heinrich entered the Imperial Navy cadet program. His naval education included a two-year voyage around the world (1878–1880), the naval officer examination (Seeoffizierhauptprüfung) in October 1880, and attending the German naval academy (1884–1886).

=== Early commands ===
As a Prussian prince, Henry quickly achieved command. In 1887, he commanded a torpedo boat and simultaneously the First Torpedo Boat Division; in 1888 the Imperial yacht SMY Hohenzollern; from 1889 to 1890 the protected cruiser SMS Irene, the coastal defense ship Beowulf, the ironclad Sachsen and the pre-dreadnought battleship Wörth.

=== Squadron commands ===
From 1897, Prince Henry commanded several naval task forces; these included an improvised squadron that took part with the East Asia Squadron in consolidating and securing the German hold on the region of Kiaochow and the port of Tsingtao in 1898. The prince's success was more of the diplomatic than the military variety; he became the first European potentate ever to be received at the Chinese imperial court. In 1899 he became officially the commander of the East Asia Squadron, later of a capital-ship squadron and in 1903 commander of the Baltic Sea naval station. From 1906 to 1909, Henry was commander of the High Seas Fleet. In 1909, he was promoted to Grand Admiral.

=== World War I ===
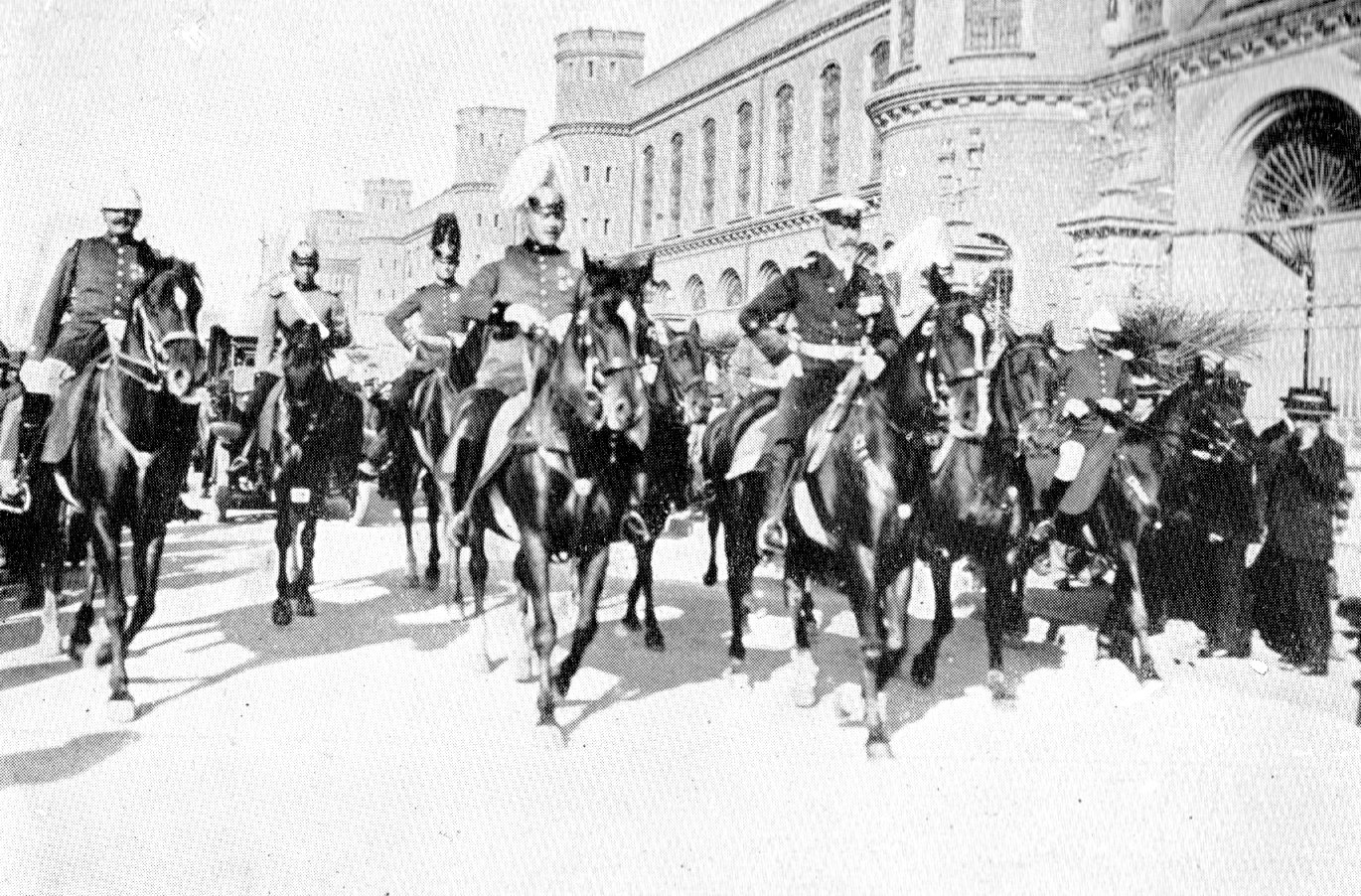
Prince Henry of Prussia in Santiago de Chile, early April 1914, on the occasion of the visit of the Detached Division of the Imperial Navy to Chile

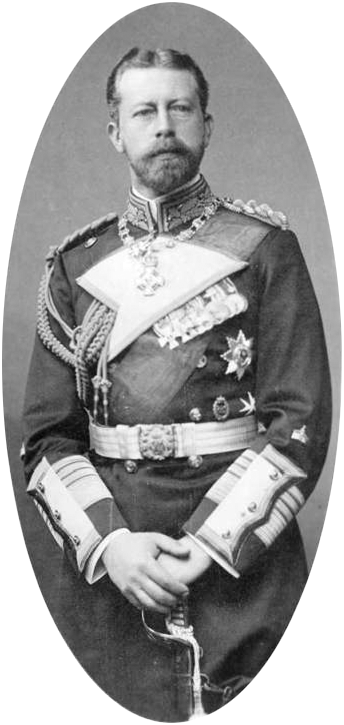
A portrait of Prince Henry of Prussia

At the beginning of World War I, Prince Henry was named as Commander-in-Chief of the Baltic Fleet. Although the means provided to him were far inferior to Russia's Baltic Fleet, he succeeded, until the 1917 Revolution, in putting Russian naval forces far on the defensive and hindered them from making attacks on the German coast. After the end of hostilities with Russia, his mission was ended, and Prince Henry simply left active duty. With the war's end and the dissolution of the monarchy in Germany, Prince Henry left the navy.

== Family ==
On 24 May 1888, Henry married Princess Irene of Hesse and by Rhine, his first cousin. His dying father, German Emperor Frederick III and his mother Empress Victoria were in attendance. The marriage produced three children:

Name	Picture	Birth	Death	Notes
Waldemar William Louis Frederick Victor Henry		20 March 1889	2 May 1945	Married Princess Calixta of Lippe, but had no issue.
William Victor Charles Augustus Henry Sigismund		27 November 1896	14 November 1978	Married Princess Charlotte of Saxe-Altenburg, had issue.
Henry Victor Louis Frederick		9 January 1900	26 February 1904	Was a haemophiliac and died aged four after bumping his head

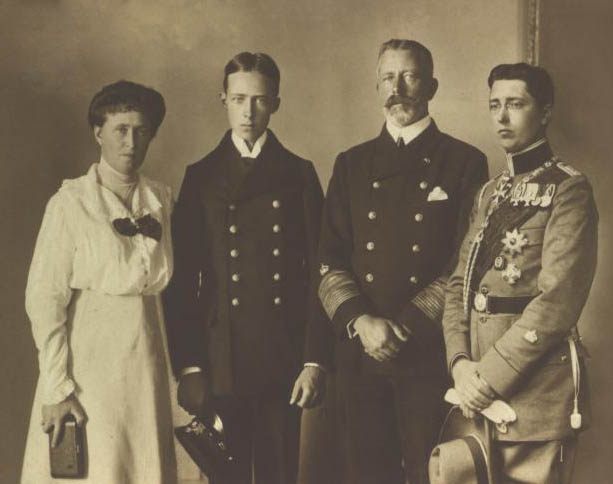
Prince Henry with his wife, Princess Irene, and their sons Waldemar and Sigismund

Their sons Waldemar and Heinrich were both hemophiliacs, a disease which they inherited through Irene from the maternal grandmother of both of their parents, Queen Victoria, who was a carrier.

== Personality and private life ==
Henry received one of the first pilot's licenses in Germany, and was judged a spirited and excellent seaman. He was dedicated to modern technology and was able to understand quickly the practical value of technical innovations. A yachting enthusiast, Prince Henry became one of the first members of the Yacht Club of Kiel, established by a group of naval officers in 1887, and quickly became the club's patron.

Henry was interested in motor cars as well and supposedly invented a windshield wiper and, according to other sources, the car horn.

In his honor, the Prinz-Heinrich-Fahrt (Prince Heinrich Tour) was established in 1908, like the earlier Kaiserpreis a precursor to the German Grand Prix. Henry and his brother William gave patronage to the Kaiserlicher Automobilclub (Imperial Automobile Club). From 1911 to 1914 the British car makers Vauxhall Motors produced a model, the C-10, which was called the "Vauxhall Prince Henry" in his honour after initially being built for participation in the 1911 race.

After the German Revolution, Henry lived with his family in Hemmelmark near Eckernförde, in Schleswig-Holstein. He continued with motor sports and sailing and even in old age was a very successful participant in regattas. He popularized the Prince Henry cap, which is still worn, especially by older sailors.

In 1899, Henry received an honorary doctorate (Doctor of Engineering honoris causa) from the Technische Hochschule in Charlottenburg (now Technische Universität Berlin) . Also in foreign countries he received numerous similar honors, including an honorary doctorate (LL.D.) from Harvard University in March 1902, during his visit to the United States.

Prince Henry died of throat cancer on 20 April 1929 in Hemmelmark.

George Burroughs Torrey painted a portrait of him.

== Naval career and advancement ==
- Unterleutnant zur See, 14 August 1872; Basic Training and Naval Academy 1877-1878
- Leutnant zur See, 18 October 1881; Training Cruises and Naval Academy 1878-1882
- Kapitänleutnant, 18 October 1884; Executive Officer, ironclad corvette SMS Oldenburg, 1886
- Korvettenkapitän, 18 October 1887; Commander, 1st Torpedo Boat Division, 1887; Commander, Imperial Yacht SMY Hohenzollern, 1888
- Kapitän zur See, 27 January 1889; Commander, protected cruiser SMS Irene, 1889–1890; Commander, Armored Coastal Defense Ship SMS Beowulf, 1892; Commander, ironclad corvette SMS Sachsen, 1892–1894; Commander, pre-dreadnought battleship SMS Wörth, 1894–1895
- Konteradmiral, 15 September 1895; Commander, 2nd Division, 1st Battle Squadron, 1896–1897; Commander, 2nd Division, Cruiser Squadron, 1897–1899
- Vizeadmiral, 5 December 1899; Commander, Cruiser Squadron, 1899–1900; Commander, 1st Battle Squadron, 1900–1903
- Admiral, 13 September 1901; Commanding Admiral, Baltic Sea Naval Command, 1903–1906, Commander, High Seas Fleet, 1906–1909
- Großadmiral, 4 September 1909; Inspector General of the Imperial Navy, 1909–1918; Commander-in-Chief, Baltic Fleet, 1914–1918

== Regimental commissions and honorary ranks ==
=== German ===
- 1. Garde-Regiment zu Fuß (Royal Prussian 1st Regiment of Foot Guards) – Leutnant (Second Lieutenant) through Generaloberst im Range eines Generalfeldmarschalls (Colonel-General in the Rank of Field Marshal), 1871–1918
- Kgl. Sächs. 2. Grenadier-Regiment Kaiser Wilhelm, König von Preußen Nr. 101 (Royal Saxon 2nd Grenadier Regiment)
- Kgl. Bayerisches Artillerie-Regiment Nr. 8 (Royal Bavarian 8th Artillery Regiment) – Generaloberst im Range eines Generalfeldmarschalls and Chef (Colonel in Chief)
- 1. Großherzogl. Hessisches Feldartilleree-Regiment 25 (Grand Duchy of Hesse 2nd Artillery Regiment)
- Fußilier-Regiment "Prinz Heinrich von Preußen" (Brandenburgisches) Nr 35 (The Brandenburg Fusilier Regiment) – Generaloberst im Range eines Generalfeldmarschalls and Chef (Colonel in Chief)

=== Foreign ===
- Austria-Hungary: K.u.K. Infantry Regiment Nr. 20 – Oberstinhaber (Colonel in Chief)
- Austria-Hungary: K.u.K. Kriegsmarine (Navy) – Admiral (Honorary)
  - Vizeadmiral (vice admiral)
  - Konteradmiral (rear-admiral) 1899
- United Kingdom: Royal Navy – Admiral of the Fleet (Honorary) 27 January 1910.
  - Admiral (Honorary) 13 September 1901
  - Vice-Admiral (Honorary) 5 February 1901.
- Russian Empire: Imperial Dragoon Regiment Nr. 33 – Colonel

== Honours ==
National

- Prussia:
  - Knight of the Black Eagle, 14 August 1872; with Collar, 1881
  - Grand Cross of the Red Eagle, 1872
  - Knight of the Royal Crown Order, 1st Class, 14 August 1872
  - Grand Commander's Cross of the Royal House Order of Hohenzollern, 14 August 1872
  - Knight of Justice of the Johanniter Order
  - Long Service Award
  - Pour le Mérite (military), 1 August 1916; with Oak Leaves, 24 January 1918
- (Hohenzollern-Sigmaringen) Hohenzollern: Cross of Honour of the Princely House Order of Hohenzollern, 1st Class
- Anhalt: Grand Cross of the Order of Albert the Bear, 1884
- Baden:
  - Knight of the House Order of Fidelity, 1881
  - Knight of the Order of Berthold the First, 1881
- (Kingdom of Bavaria) Bavaria: Knight of St. Hubert, 1886
- Brunswick: Grand Cross of the Order of Henry the Lion, 1888
- (Saxe-Coburg and Gotha) (Duchy of Saxe-Altenburg) (Saxe-Meiningen) Ernestine duchies: Grand Cross of the Saxe-Ernestine House Order, 1885
- (Bremen (state)) (Hamburg) Free Hanseatic Cities: Hanseatic Crosses
- (Grand Duchy of Hesse) Hesse and by Rhine:
  - Grand Cross of the Ludwig Order, 1 April 1875
  - Knight of the Golden Lion, with Collar, 24 May 1888
  - Medal of Bravery
- Mecklenburg: Grand Cross of the Wendish Crown, with Crown in Ore and Diamonds
- Oldenburg: Grand Cross of the Order of Duke Peter Friedrich Ludwig, with Golden Crown, 18 February 1878
- Saxe-Weimar-Eisenach: Grand Cross of the White Falcon, 1882
- Saxony:
  - Knight of the Rue Crown, 1882
  - Grand Cross of the Albert Order, with Crown and Swords
- Württemberg: Grand Cross of the Württemberg Crown, 1882

Foreign

- (Austrian Empire) (Kingdom of Hungary) Austria-Hungary: Grand Cross of the Royal Hungarian Order of St. Stephen, 1872
- Belgium: Grand Cordon of the Order of Leopold
- Brazil: Grand Cross of the Southern Cross
- Bulgaria: Grand Cross of St. Alexander
- China: Order of the Double Dragon, Class I Grade II
- Denmark: Knight of the Elephant, 30 July 1888
- Finland: Grand Cross of the Cross of Liberty, 1918
- Greece: Grand Cross of the Redeemer
- Hawaii: Grand Cross of the Order of Kalākaua
- Italy:
  - Knight of the Annunciation, 18 October 1875
  - Grand Cross of Saints Maurice and Lazarus, 18 October 1875
  - (Tuscany) Tuscan Grand Ducal family: Grand Cross of St. Joseph
- Holy See: Knight of the Supreme Order of Christ
- Japan: Grand Cordon of the Order of the Chrysanthemum, 10 June 1879
- Korea: Grand Cordon of the Order of the Golden Ruler, 1904
- Montenegro: Grand Cross of the Order of Prince Danilo I
- Netherlands: Grand Cross of the Netherlands Lion
- Ottoman Empire: Order of Osmanieh, 1st Class with Diamonds
- Portugal:
  - Grand Cross of the Sash of the Two Orders
  - Grand Cross of the Tower and Sword
- Romania: Grand Cross of the Star of Romania
- Russia:
  - Knight of St. Andrew
  - Knight of St. Alexander Nevsky
  - Knight of the White Eagle
  - Knight of St. Anna, 1st Class
  - Knight of St. Stanislaus, 1st Class
- Serbia: Grand Cross of the White Eagle
- Johor: First Class of the Royal Family Order of Johor, 24 February 1898
- (Thailand) Siam: Knight of the Order of the Royal House of Chakri, 24 December 1899
- Spain:
  - Knight of the Golden Fleece, 3 October 1883
  - Grand Cross of Naval Merit, with White Decoration, 1903
- Sweden-Norway:
  - Knight of the Seraphim, 17 October 1887
  - Grand Cross of St. Olav, with Collar, 1 August 1888
- United Kingdom:
  - Honorary Grand Cross of the Bath (civil), 13 August 1881 (expelled in 1915)
  - Stranger Knight Companion of the Garter, 8 August 1889 (expelled in 1915)
  - Recipient of the Royal Victorian Chain, 9 August 1902 (revoked in 1915)
- Venezuela: Collar of the Order of the Liberator

=== Honorary degrees and offices ===
- Freedom of the City of New York, 25 February 1902, during his visit to the city.
- Freedom of the City of Philadelphia, 10 March 1902, during his visit to the city.
- Honorary doctorate (LL.D.) from Harvard University, 6 March 1902.

== Ancestry ==
Ancestors of Prince Henry of Prussia (born 1862)

8. Frederick William III of Prussia
4. William I, German Emperor
9. Duchess Louise of Mecklenburg-Strelitz
2. Frederick III, German Emperor
10. Charles Frederick, Grand Duke of Saxe-Weimar-Eisenach
5. Princess Augusta of Saxe-Weimar-Eisenach
11. Grand Duchess Maria Pavlovna of Russia
1. Prince Henry of Prussia
12. Ernest I, Duke of Saxe-Coburg and Gotha
6. Prince Albert of Saxe-Coburg and Gotha
13. Princess Louise of Saxe-Gotha-Altenburg
3. Victoria, Princess Royal
14. Prince Edward, Duke of Kent and Strathearn
7. Victoria of the United Kingdom
15. Princess Victoria of Saxe-Coburg-Saalfeld

Political offices
Preceded by New post	Commander-in-Chief of High Seas Fleet of the Imperial German Navy; 1907–1909	Succeeded by Henning von Holtzendorff
