= The Marriage of Princess Alice =

Painting by George Housman Thomas

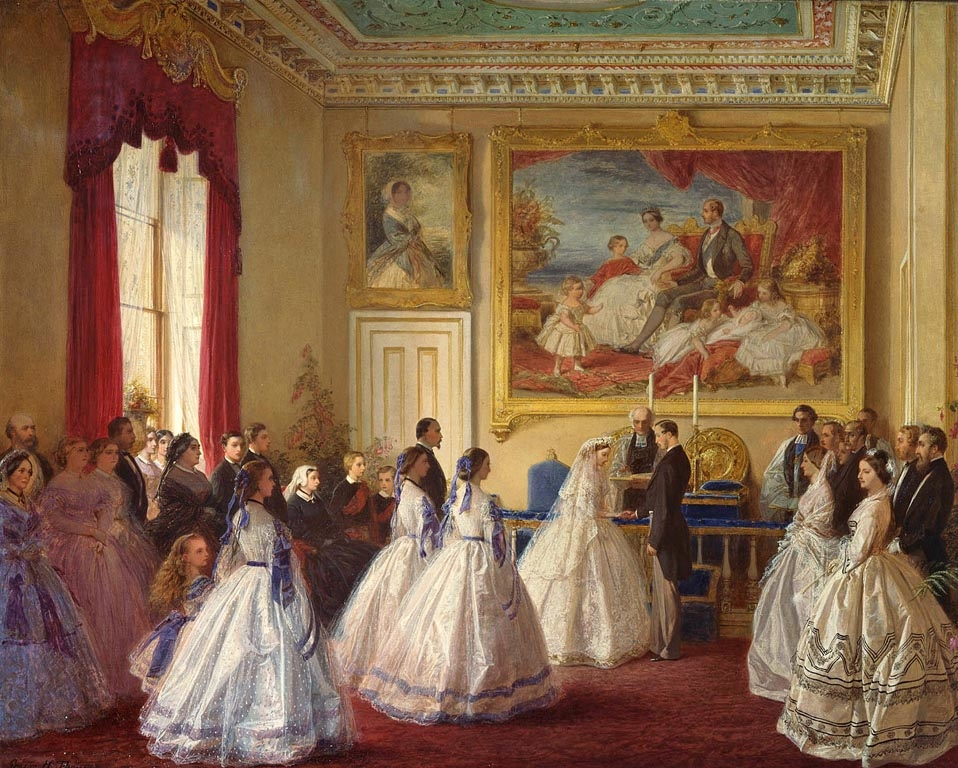
- Artist: George Housman Thomas
- Year: 1862–63
- Type: Oil on canvas, historical painting
- Dimensions: 53.8 cm × 67.0 cm (21.2 in × 26.4 in)
- Location: Royal Collection

The Marriage of Princess Alice is an oil on canvas history painting by the British artist George Housman Thomas, from 1862–63.

== History and description ==
It depicts the wedding of Princess Alice of the United Kingdom and Prince Louis of Hesse and by Rhine in the Dining Room at Osborne House on 1 July 1862.

Alice was the second daughter of Queen Victoria and Prince Albert. Louis, a minor German prince, was a nephew of Louis III, Grand Duke of Hesse. The work was commissioned by Queen Victoria from Thomas. In the background of the painting and on the wall of the dining room are shown Franz Xaver Winterhalter's portraits of the Royal Family and of the Duchess of Kent and Strathearn. Queen Victoria is depicted sitting across the room near the window and opposite the groom's parents, Prince Charles and Princess Elisabeth. Also depicted are the bridesmaids: the bride's sisters Princess Louise, Princess Helena and Princess Beatrice, and the groom's sister Princess Anna of Hesse and by Rhine.

The painting went on display at the Royal Academy Summer Exhibition in 1863.
