= Otto, King of Bavaria =

King of Bavaria from 1886 to 1913

Otto
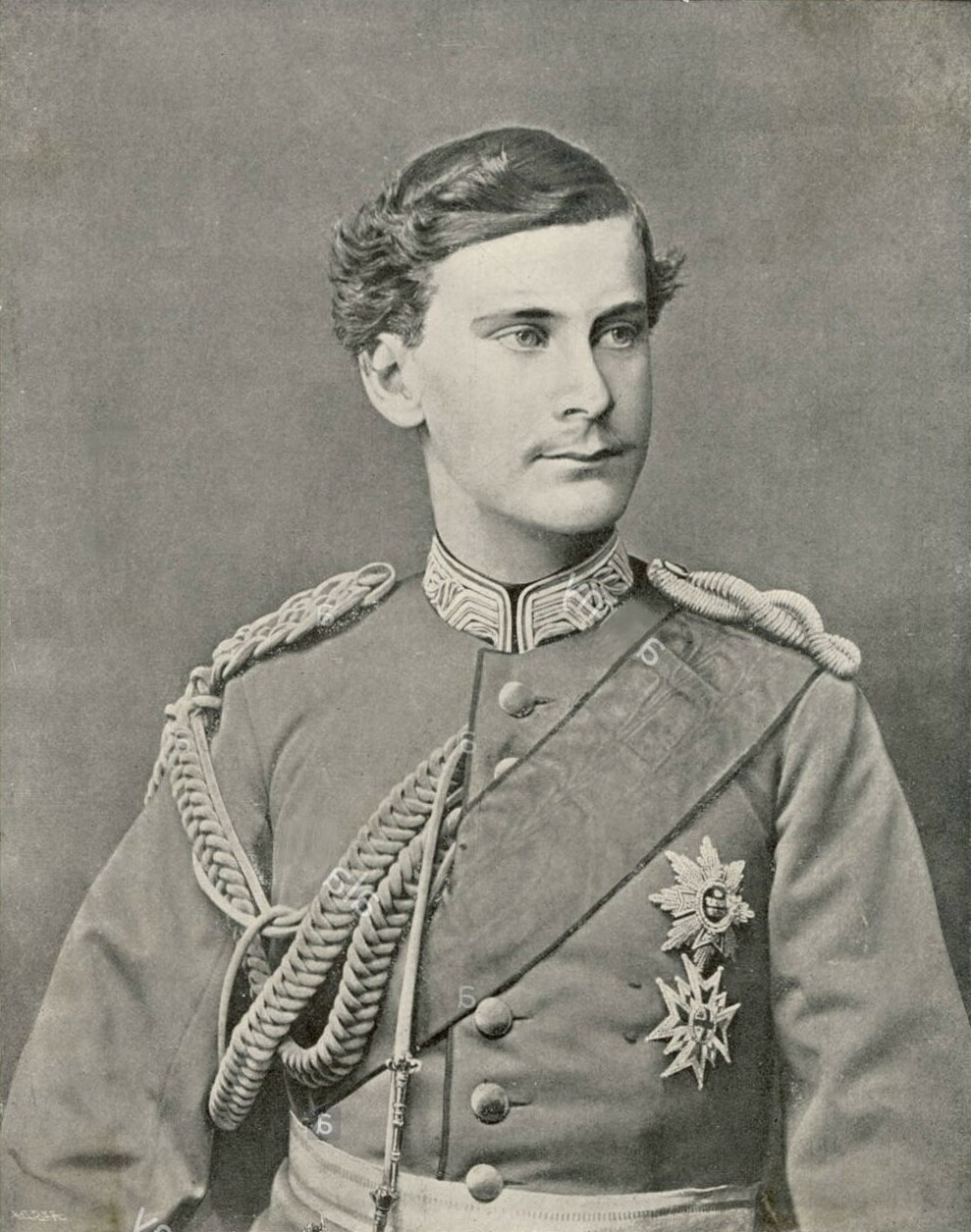

King of Bavaria
- Reign: 13 June 1886 – 5 November 1913
- Predecessor: Ludwig II
- Successor: Ludwig III
- Regents: Prince Luitpold (1886–1912); Prince Ludwig (1912–1913)
- Prime Ministers: See list: Johann von Lutz Friedrich Krafft von Crailsheim Clemens von Podewils-Dürniz Georg von Hertling
- Born: 27 April 1848; The Residence, Munich, Kingdom of Bavaria
- Died: 11 October 1916 (aged 68); Fürstenried Palace, Munich, Kingdom of Bavaria, German Empire
- Burial: St. Michael's Church, Munich, Kingdom of Bavaria
- House: Wittelsbach
- Father: Maximilian II of Bavaria
- Mother: Marie of Prussia
- Religion: Roman Catholicism

Otto (German: Otto Wilhelm Luitpold Adalbert Waldemar; 27 April 1848 – 11 October 1916) was King of Bavaria from 1886 until 1913. However, he never actively ruled because of severe mental illness. His uncle, Luitpold, and his cousin, Ludwig, served as regents. Ludwig deposed him in 1913, a day after the legislature passed a law allowing him to do so, and became king in his own right as Ludwig III.

Otto was the son of Maximilian II and his wife, Marie of Prussia, and the younger brother of Ludwig II.

== Childhood and youth ==
Prince Otto was born on 27 April 1848, two months premature, in the Munich Residenz. His parents were King Maximilian II of Bavaria and Marie of Prussia. His uncle, King Otto I of Greece, served as his godfather.

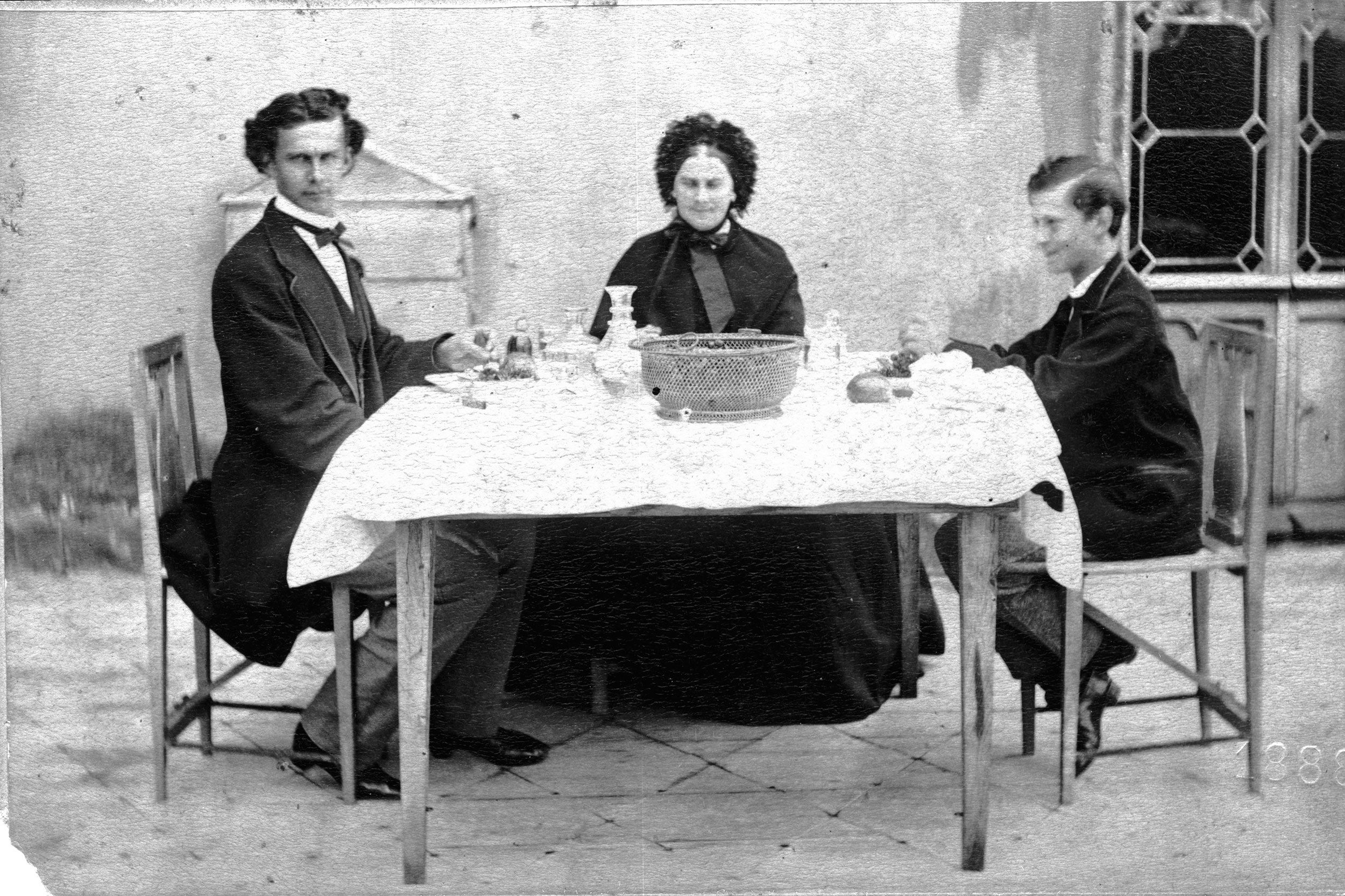
Family photo of Otto (right) with his elder brother Crown Prince Ludwig (left) and mother Queen Maria (center) in 1860

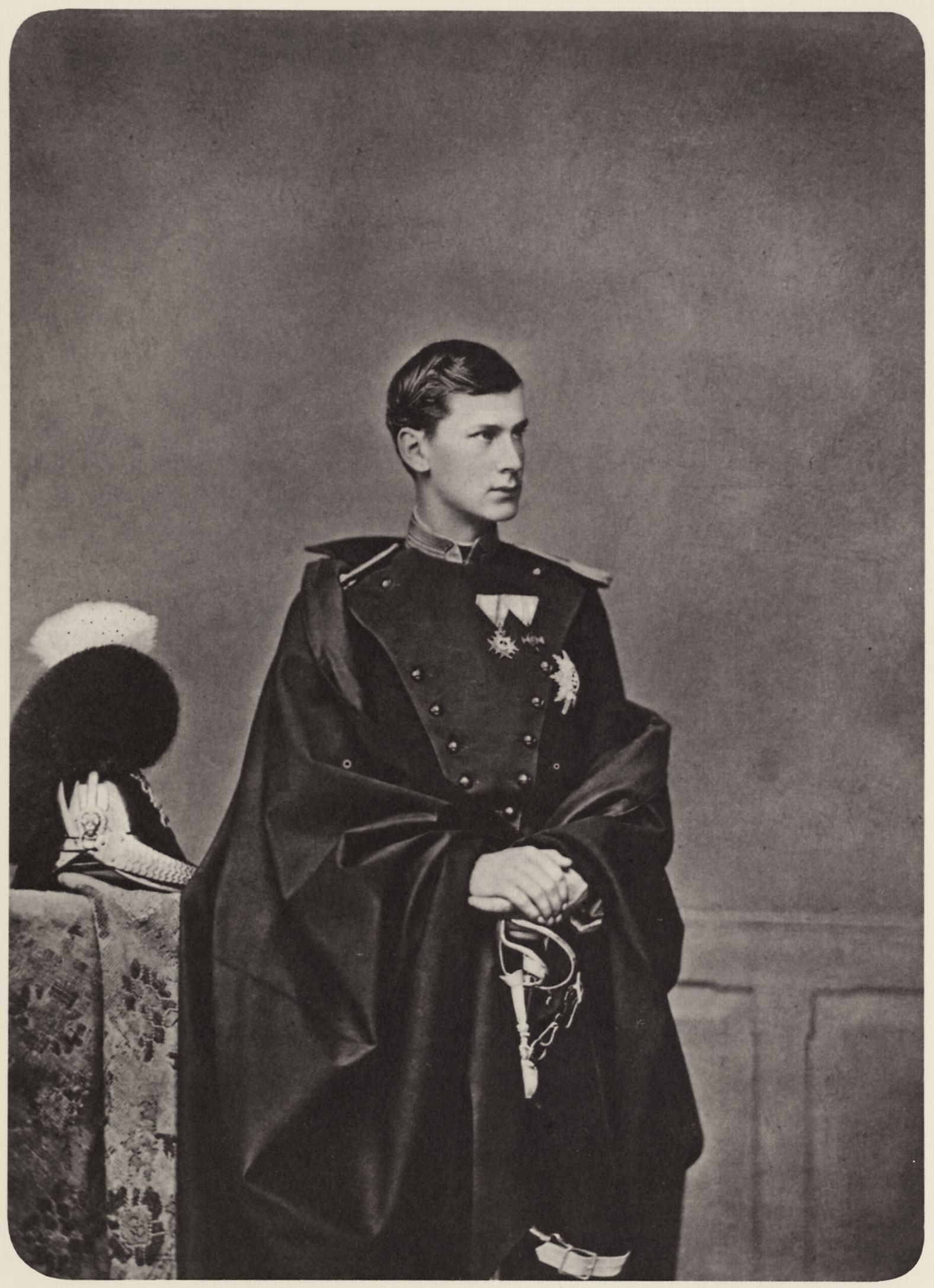
Otto I at a young age in military uniform, circa 1875

Otto had an older brother, Crown Prince Ludwig. They spent most of their childhood with servants and teachers at Hohenschwangau Castle. Their parents were distant and formal, and they were at such a loss about what to say to Otto and Ludwig that they often ignored and even avoided them. Their mother took an interest in what the brothers wore: she ordered for Ludwig to always be dressed in blue and for Otto to always wear red. Their father was strict with the brothers, particularly Ludwig, the heir apparent. Between 1853 and 1863, the brothers spent their summer holidays at the Royal Villa in Berchtesgaden, which had been specially built for their father.

Otto served in the Bavarian army from 1863. He was appointed sub-lieutenant on 27 April 1863 and admitted to the Cadet Corps on 1 March 1864. On 26 May 1864, he was promoted to full lieutenant.

On 10 March 1864, King Maximilian died and Otto's brother, Ludwig, succeeded as King of Bavaria. Between 18 June and 15 July 1864, the two brothers received state visits by the emperors of Austria and Russia.

Otto was promoted to Captain on 27 April 1866 and entered active military service in the Royal Bavarian Infantry Guards. He participated in the Austro-Prussian War of 1866 and as colonel in the Franco-Prussian War of 1870–1871. His experiences on the battlefield traumatized him and caused him to have depression and insomnia. When Wilhelm I was proclaimed German Emperor on 18 January 1871 at the Palace of Versailles, Prince Otto and his uncle, Luitpold, represented King Ludwig II, who refused to participate (despite having offered Wilhelm the Imperial title in a letter). Otto then criticized the celebration as ostentatious and heartless in a letter to his brother. Otto despised his ambitious Prussian relatives and cordially disliked his Prussian mother and so they were appalled by the creation of the new German Empire. His hostility was no secret to the Prussian government.

Otto and Ludwig were often seen together during the early years of Ludwig's reign, but they became estranged over time. Ludwig was shy and introverted and eventually became a recluse. Otto was cheerful, outgoing and extroverted until the Franco-Prussian War. In 1868, Otto received the Royal Order of Saint George for the Defense of the Immaculate Conception, the house order of the House of Wittelsbach. In 1869, he joined the Order of the Holy Sepulchre, on the initiative of Cardinal Karl-August von Reisach.

== Mental incapacity ==
After the Franco-Prussian War, Otto became very depressed and anxious, which worried his family. Otto had spells during which he slept poorly for days and acted out, followed by periods of time during which he was perfectly normal and lucid. His illness progressively grew worse. Ludwig was horrified because he had been counting on Otto to marry and have a son who could eventually inherit the throne. Otto was placed under medical supervision, and reports about his condition were sent by spies working for the Prussian Chancellor, Otto von Bismarck. Doctors reported that Otto was mentally ill in January 1872. From 1873, he was held in isolation in the southern pavilion of Nymphenburg Palace. His attending physician was Dr. Bernhard von Gudden, who later diagnosed Otto's brother, Ludwig, as mentally ill without examining him, which raises questions about his competence and his motives. Both Ludwig and Otto despised Prussia, and their uncle, Luitpold, and Gudden supported Prussia's rise to dominance. Some contemporaries believed that Gudden's diagnoses of Otto and Ludwig were motivated by political considerations and that more could and should have been done to help and treat Otto. Some contemporaries also believed that Bismarck did not want Ludwig nor Otto to remain in power and decided to replace the brothers with their malleable uncle, Luitpold.

During Corpus Christi Mass in 1875 in the Frauenkirche in Munich, Otto, who had not attended the church service, rushed into the church wearing hunting clothes and fell on his knees before the celebrant, Archbishop Gregor von Scherr, to ask forgiveness for his sins. The High Mass was interrupted, and the prince did not resist when he was led away by two church ministers. Otto was then moved to Schleissheim Palace and was effectively held prisoner there, much to his dismay. Gudden made no effort to treat him; it is possible that Otto was heavily drugged. Otto's last public appearance was his presence at the side of his brother at the King's parade on 22 August 1875, at the Marsfeld in Munich. From 1 June 1876, he stayed for a few weeks in the castle at Ludwigsthal in the Bavarian Forest. In the spring of 1880, his condition worsened. In 1883, he was confined under medical supervision in Fürstenried Palace near Munich, where he would remain for the rest of his life. The palace had been specially converted for his confinement. Ludwig occasionally visited him at night and ordered for no violence to be used against him.

In 1886, the senior royal medical officer wrote a statement declaring that Otto was severely mentally ill. Otto may have had schizophrenia. It has also been argued that his illness was the result of syphilis, which would also account for the paralysis he had in later years.

In 1894, Otto had shown signs of recovery and was cleared to attend a fête champêtre at Bamberg where he smashed sixty-five bottles of "high grade champagne".

== King of Bavaria ==
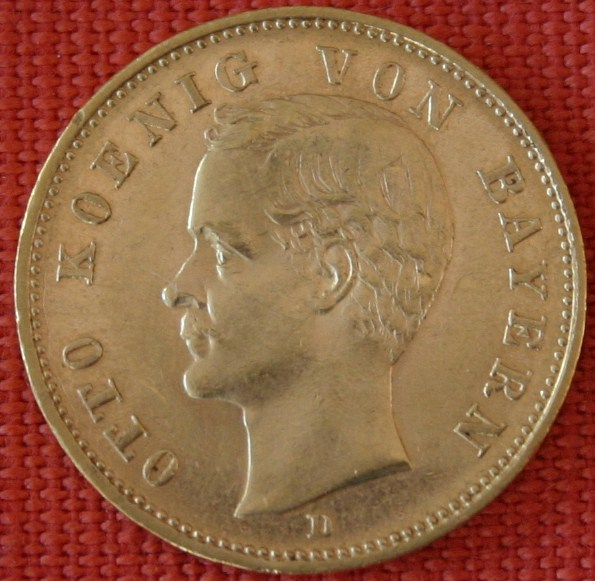
Mark coin from 1905 with portrait of King Otto

When King Ludwig II was deposed by his ministers on 10 June 1886, his uncle Luitpold took over the rule of the Kingdom of Bavaria and led the affairs of state in Ludwig's place as regent. Only three days later Ludwig II died under unknown circumstances, and Prince Otto succeeded him as King of Bavaria on 13 June 1886 in accordance with the Wittelsbach succession law.

Since Otto was unable to lead the government due to his mental illness (officially it was said: "The King is melancholic"), Prince Regent Luitpold also reigned for him. He did not understand the proclamation of his accession to the throne, which was explained to King Otto at Fürstenried Palace the next day after his accession. He thought his uncle Luitpold was the rightful king. Shortly thereafter, the Bavarian Army troops were sworn in the name of King Otto I and coins were minted with his portrait.

== End of reign and death ==
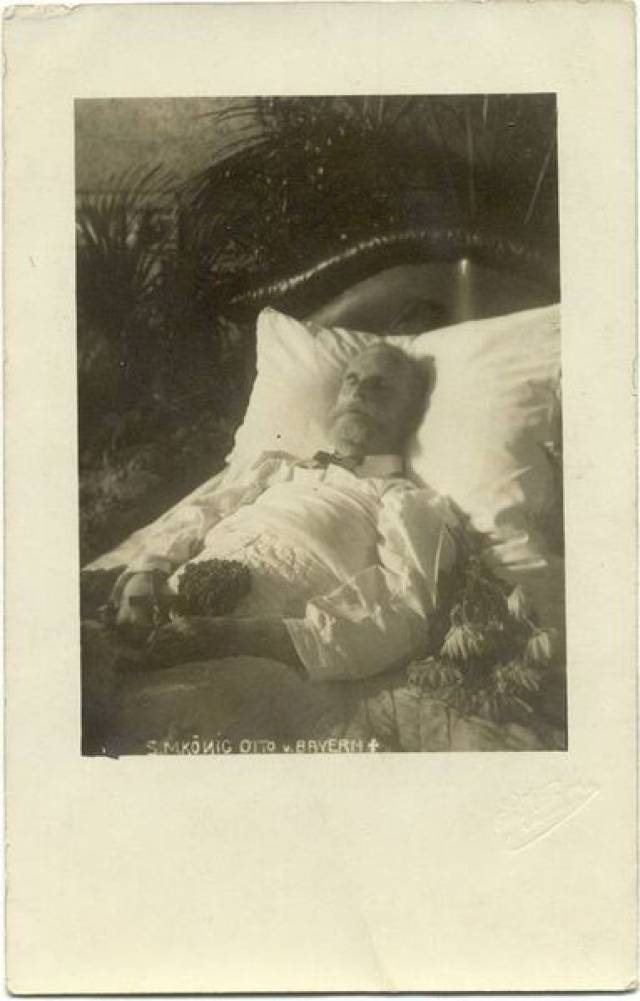
Otto I on his deathbed

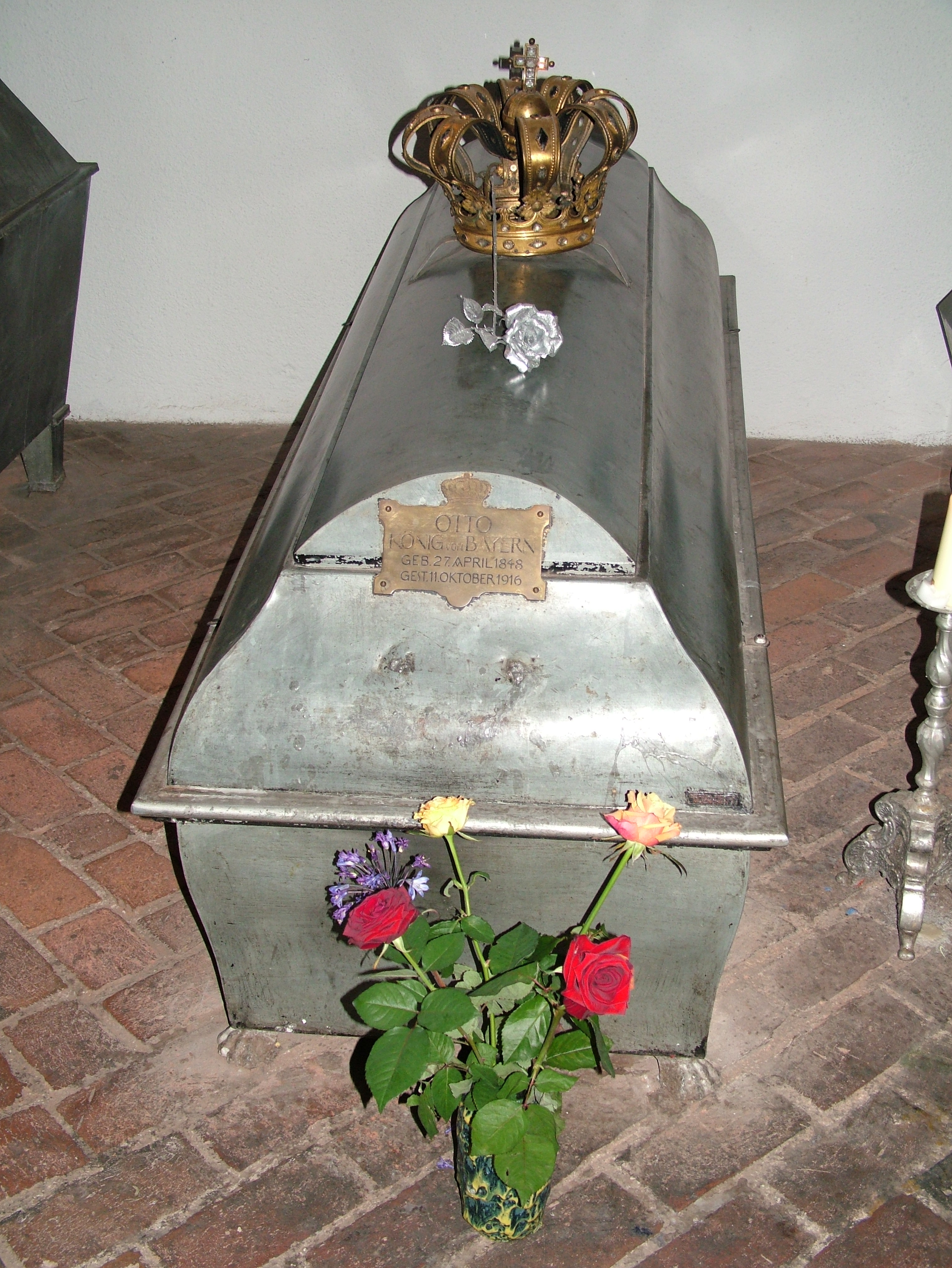
Sarcophagus of King Otto I in the St. Michael's Church in Munich

Luitpold kept his role as Prince Regent until he died in 1912 and was succeeded by his son Ludwig, who was Otto's first cousin. By then, it had been obvious for some time that Otto would never emerge from seclusion or be mentally capable of actively reigning. Almost as soon as Ludwig became regent, elements in the press and larger society clamoured for Ludwig to become King in his own right.

Accordingly, the constitution of Bavaria was amended on 4 November 1913 to include a clause specifying that if a regency for reasons of incapacity lasted for ten years, with no expectation that the King would ever be able to reign, the Regent could end the regency, depose the King and assume the crown himself with the assent of the legislature. The following day, Prince Regent Ludwig ended the regency, cast his cousin down from the throne, and proclaimed his own reign as Ludwig III. The parliament assented on 6 November, and Ludwig III took the constitutional oath on 8 November. King Otto was permitted to retain his title and honours for life.

King Otto died unexpectedly on 11 October 1916 from a volvulus (an obstruction of the bowel). His remains were interred in the crypt of the Michaelskirche in Munich. In accordance with Bavarian royal tradition, the heart of the King was placed in a silver urn and sent to the Gnadenkapelle (Shrine of Our Lady of Altötting) in Altötting, beside those of his brother, father and grandfather.

== Honours ==
Greater Royal Coat of Arms of King Otto of Bavaria

He received the following orders and decorations:

- Kingdom of Bavaria:
  - Knight of St. Hubert
  - Commander of the Military Merit Order
  - Army Memorial Cross (1866)
  - Grand Prior of Upper Bavaria of the Royal Bavarian House Equestrian Order of St. George, 1868
- Austria-Hungary: Knight of the Golden Fleece, 1869
- Kingdom of Greece: Grand Cross of the Redeemer
- Grand Duchy of Hesse: Grand Cross of the Ludwig Order, 27 April 1866
- Holy See: Grand Cross of the Holy Sepulchre of Jerusalem, 1869
- Kingdom of Portugal: Grand Cross of the Tower and Sword
- Kingdom of Prussia:
  - Knight of the Black Eagle, 20 October 1867
  - Iron Cross (1870), 2nd Class, 15 January 1871
- Russian Empire:
  - Knight of St. Andrew, 23 April 1866
  - Knight of St. Alexander Nevsky, in Diamonds
  - Knight of the White Eagle
  - Knight of St. Anna, 1st Class
  - Knight of St. Stanislaus, 1st Class
- Spain: Grand Cross of the Order of Charles III, 26 June 1868
- Beylik of Tunis: Grand Cordon of the Order of Glory

== Ancestors ==
Ancestors of Otto, King of Bavaria

8. Maximilian I Joseph of Bavaria
4. Ludwig I of Bavaria
9. Princess Augusta Wilhelmine of Hesse-Darmstadt
2. Maximilian II of Bavaria
10. Frederick, Duke of Saxe-Altenburg
5. Princess Therese of Saxe-Hildburghausen
11. Duchess Charlotte Georgine of Mecklenburg-Strelitz
1. Otto of Bavaria
12. Frederick William II of Prussia
6. Prince Wilhelm of Prussia
13. Princess Frederica Louisa of Hesse-Darmstadt
3. Princess Marie of Prussia
14. Frederick V, Landgrave of Hesse-Homburg
7. Princess Maria Anna of Hesse-Homburg
15. Princess Caroline of Hesse-Darmstadt

== Portrayals in media ==
- Ludwig II (1922), an Austrian silent film featuring Josef Glücksmann as Otto.
- Ludwig der Zweite, König von Bayern, German with German actor Hans Heinrich von Twardowski as Otto.
- Ludwig II (1955), West German production with German actor Klaus Kinski as Otto.
- Ludwig (1973), with John Moulder-Brown as Otto.
- Ludwig II (2012), German-Austrian production with German actor Tom Schilling portraying Otto.

== Footnotes ==
Otto, King of Bavaria House of Wittelsbach Born: 27 April 1848 Died: 11 October 1916
Regnal titles
Preceded by Ludwig II	King of Bavaria; 13 June 1886 – 5 November 1913	Succeeded by Ludwig III
