= Prince Heinrich of Hesse and by Rhine =

Prince of Hesse and by Rhine (1838–1900)

Prince Heinrich
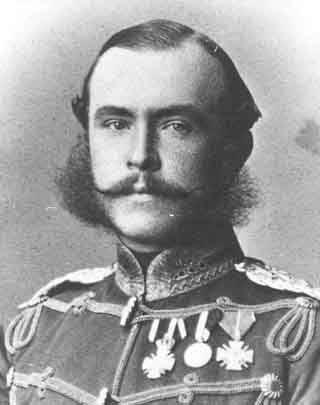
- Prince Heinrich c. 1865
- Born: 28 November 1838; Bessungen, Grand Duchy of Hesse
- Died: 16 September 1900 (aged 61); Munich, German Empire
Names
- Heinrich Ludwig Wilhelm Adalbert Waldemar Alexander
- House: Hesse-Darmstadt
- Father: Prince Charles of Hesse and by Rhine
- Mother: Princess Elisabeth of Prussia

Prince Heinrich of Hesse and by Rhine (Heinrich Ludwig Wilhelm Adalbert Waldemar Alexander; 28 November 1838 – 16 September 1900) was a member of the House of Hesse-Darmstadt and a General of the Cavalry.

== Biography ==
He was the second son of Prince Charles of Hesse and by Rhine and Princess Elisabeth of Prussia and a younger brother of the later Louis IV, Grand Duke of Hesse.
Heinrich studied in Göttingen and Giessen and joined the Hessian army as a lieutenant in 1854. In 1859 he joined the Prussian Army as a captain and fought in the First Schleswig War and the Austro-Prussian War.

On 17 September 1866 Heinrich became commander of the 2nd Guards Uhlan Regiment. He led the regiment during the Franco-Prussian War and received the Iron Cross (2nd class). In 1873, Heinrich was promoted to Generalmajor. In 1879 he became commander of the 25th (Grand Ducal Hessian) Division and shortly afterwards was promoted to Lieutenant General. On 21 August 1884 Heinrich was given the distinction of a Commanding General and two years later, on 18 September 1886, was promoted to General of the Cavalry. On 7 July 1887, Heinrich retired and received the Pour le Mérite; being the final recipient by order of William I as the latter died in the next year.

In retirement he eventually settled in Munich. From 1881 until his death he also was a member of the Hessian Landstände. According to his niece Victoria, Marchioness of Milford Haven, he was a friend and admirer of his cousin Ludwig II of Bavaria, and "never would believe that his cousin was really insane and declared the latter's sad and mysterious death - he and the doctor appointed to watch over him were found drowned together in the Lake which surrounded the castle in which the King was interned - was all due to the machinations of Prince Luitpold."

== Marriage and children ==
Heinrich married morganatically on 25 February 1878, Caroline Willich von Pöllnitz (1848-1879), member of petite nobility of Hesse. Caroline was created Freifrau von Nidda for the occasion. She died after the birth of their only child Karl, Count of Nidda (1879-1920). Heinrich's nephew Ernst Ludwig claimed that the Count of Nidda died in a lunatic asylum.

He married again in 1892 - also morganatically, to Emilie Hrzic de Topuska (1868-1961), member of the minor Croatian nobility. She was elevated to Freifrau von Dornberg. They had also one son: Elimar, Freiherr von Dornberg (1893-1917), who died in an avalanche accident.

== Honours ==
He received the following orders and decorations:

- Hesse-Darmstadt:
  - Grand Cross of the Ludwig Order, 11 April 1854
  - Grand Cross of the Merit Order of Philip the Magnanimous, with Swords, 11 April 1854
  - Military Merit Cross, 30 January 1871
- Hesse-Kassel: Knight of the Golden Lion, 9 January 1857
- (Duchy of Anhalt) Anhalt: Grand Cross of the Order of Albert the Bear, 6 June 1884
- Baden:
  - Knight of the House Order of Fidelity, 1877
  - Knight of the Order of Berthold the First, 1877
- Bavaria: Knight of St. Hubert, 1877
- Brunswick: Grand Cross of the Order of Henry the Lion, 1857
- Mecklenburg:
  - Grand Cross of the Wendish Crown, with Crown in Ore
  - Military Merit Cross, 2nd Class (Schwerin)
- Prussia:
  - Knight's Cross of the Royal House Order of Hohenzollern, with Swords, 1864; Commander's Cross and Star, with Swords, 19 October 1866
  - Iron Cross (1870), 2nd Classes
  - Knight of the Black Eagle, 9 April 1877; with Collar, 1880
  - Grand Cross of the Red Eagle
  - Pour le Mérite (military), 7 July 1887
- Romania: Grand Cross of the Star of Romania, 15 September 1880
- Russia:
  - Knight of St. Andrew, 19 July 1857
  - Knight of St. Alexander Nevsky, 19 July 1857
  - Knight of the White Eagle
  - Knight of St. Anna, 1st Class
  - Knight of St. George, 4th Class, 2 February 1871
- United Kingdom: Honorary Grand Cross of the Bath (military), 16 May 1892

== Sources ==
- Hessen und bei Rhein, Heinrich Ludwig Prinz von. Hessische Biografie. In: Landesgeschichtliches Informationssystem Hessen (LAGIS). (Stand: 15 March 2020)
