= Prince Charles of Hesse and by Rhine =

German prince, military officer and politician

Prince Charles
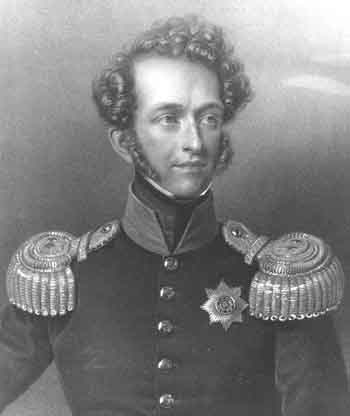
- Portrait, 1820s
- Born: 23 April 1809; Darmstadt, Grand Duchy of Hesse
- Died: 20 March 1877 (aged 67); Darmstadt, Grand Duchy of Hesse
- Burial: Altes Mausoleum in Park Rosenhöhe, Darmstadt
- Spouse: Princess Elisabeth of Prussia (m. 1836)
- Issue more...: Louis IV, Grand Duke of Hesse; Prince Heinrich of Hesse and by Rhine; Anne, Grand Duchess of Mecklenburg-Schwerin; Prince William of Hesse and by Rhine
Names
- Karl Wilhelm Ludewig
- House: Hesse-Darmstadt
- Father: Louis II, Grand Duke of Hesse
- Mother: Wilhelmine of Baden

Prince Charles of Hesse and by Rhine (German: Karl) (23 April 1809 – 20 March 1877) was a German prince, officer and politician. He was the second surviving son of Louis II, Grand Duke of Hesse and Wilhelmine of Baden. The prince had a military career and became a general in the infantry of the army of the Grand Duchy of Hesse. He was also a member of the Landtag of Hesse.

As his brother Grand Duke Louis III did not have children, he was succeeded by Prince Charles' eldest son, Grand Duke Louis IV.

== Early life ==
Prince Charles of Hesse was born on 23 April 1809 in the city of Darmstadt, capital of the newly created Grand Duchy of Hesse, established as the successor state of the Landgraviate of Hesse-Darmstadt in 1806. He was the second surviving son of Louis, Hereditary Prince of Hesse (later Grand Duke Louis II) and his wife Wilhelmine of Baden, a daughter of Karl Ludwig, Hereditary Prince of Baden. He was educated together with his older brother Prince Louis (later Grand Duke Louis III), and also made extensive educational journeys through Europe with his brother.

As a younger son, he was expected to have a military career. Initially, he joined the Imperial Austrian Army. In 1830, Prince Charles' grandfather, Grand Duke Louis I, died, and Charles' father became Grand Duke as Louis II. Shortly afterwards, in 1832, Prince Charles returned to Hesse, where he joined his father's army and became a general in the infantry.

== Marriage ==
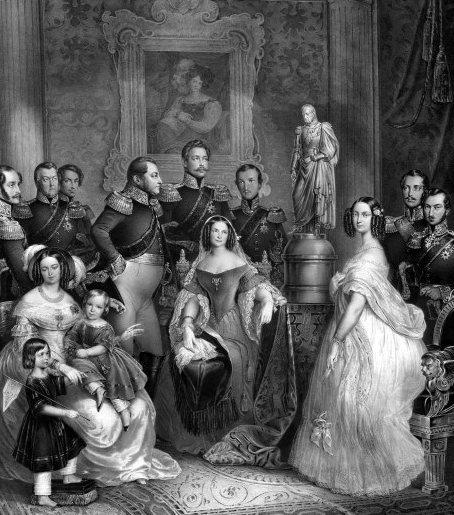
The Grand Ducal Family of Hesse in the 1840s. Prince Charles, Princess Elisabeth and their children, Prince Louis and Prince Heinrich are to the far left.

In December 1835 at Fischbach Castle in Silesia, Prince Charles was engaged to his second cousin Princess Elisabeth of Prussia. The engagement was conceived by Charles' mother, who was however to die a few weeks later. Princess Elisabeth was a daughter of Prince Wilhelm of Prussia, general of cavalry and governor of the Federal Fortress at Mainz, and his spouse Princess Maria Anna of Hesse-Homburg. She was also a niece of King Frederick William III of Prussia and her sister was the future Queen Marie of Bavaria. The wedding was celebrated on 22 October 1836 in Berlin.

The couple moved into the Prinz-Carl-Palais at Wilhelminenstraße 34 in Darmstadt, a residence they had built in Neoclassical style by the architect Georg Moller from 1834 to 1836. The couple had four children, Prince Louis, Prince Heinrich, Princess Anne, and Prince William, but they were unhappy together, as Prince Charles preferred life in the military to spending time with his family.

== Later life ==
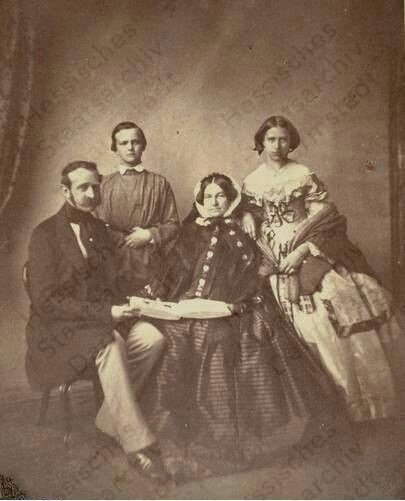
Prince Charles and Princess Elisabeth with their two youngest children, Princess Anne and Prince William in the 1860s.

From 1836 until his death in 1877, Prince Charles was colonel-in-chief of the 4. Infantry Regiment, later named "Prinz Carl" after him. In accordance with the Constitution of the Grand Duchy of Hesse, Prince Charles was a member of the First Chamber of the Landtag of the Grand Duchy of Hesse from 1834 until a reform of the electoral law in 1849. As a liberal, the prince was long an advocate of giving the Grand Duchy of Hesse a free constitution. At the March Revolution of 1848, Prince Charles' father, Grand Duke Louis II, was forced to abdicate and handed over the throne to his son, Prince Charles' older brother, who became Grand Duke Louis III. As a consequence of the reactionism, Prince Charles was again a member of the First Chamber from 1856 to 1877.

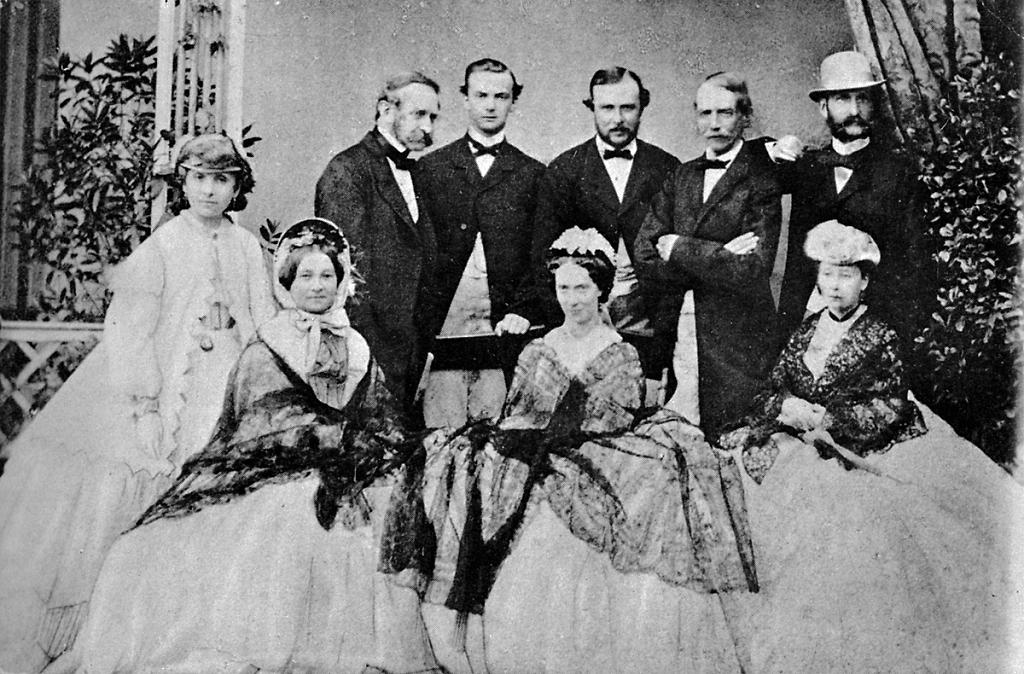
The Grand Ducal Family of Hesse at Heiligenberg Castle in 1864. 1st row from left: Countess Julia Hauke, Princess of Battenberg; Princess Elisabeth, Marie Alexandrovna, Tsarina of Russia; Princess Alice. 2nd row from left: Prince Charles, Prince Wilhelm; Prince Louis; Prince Gustav of Vasa; Prince Alexander.

As Prince Charles' elder brother, Grand Duke Louis III, and his wife Princess Mathilde of Bavaria, did not have children, Prince Charles was his heir presumptive. However, Prince Charles never became Grand Duke, partly because he died before his brother, partly because his eldest son, Prince Louis, had already been appointed successor to the throne. In 1862 the son concluded a brilliant marriage, as he married Princess Alice of the United Kingdom, second daughter of Queen Victoria of the United Kingdom and Prince Albert of Saxe-Coburg and Gotha. Two years later, his daughter Anna, who had been a confident of her cousin, the young King Ludwig II of Bavaria, married Frederick Francis II, Grand Duke of Mecklenburg-Schwerin. She died the following year, however, at the age of just 22 years.

== Death and burial ==
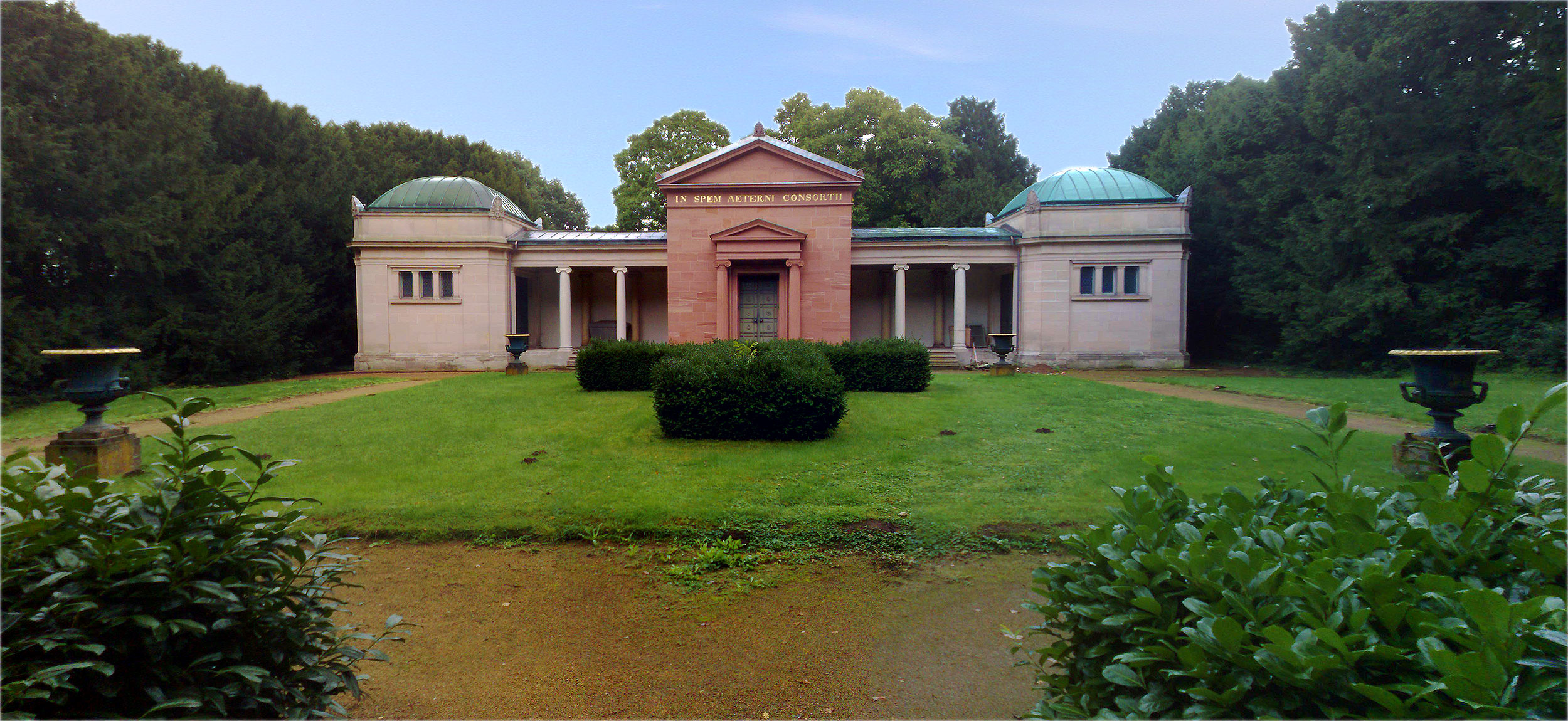
Altes Mausoleum in Park Rosenhöhe in Darmstadt

On 19 March 1877, Queen Victoria received a telegram from her daughter Alice, wife of Charles' son Louis, saying that they "feared the worst". The following evening, news reached the Queen from Alice that Charles had "passed away quite peacefully after 6." The Queen appears to have been affected by Charles' death, referring to him in her journal upon his death as "dear excellent Prince Charles of Hesse", later repeating, "So grieved and feel deeply for poor Prince Charles." From 25 March, The Court went into mourning until 5 April. Prince Charles was buried at the Altes Mausoleum at Park Rosenhöhe in Darmstadt, one of the burial sites of the House of Hesse-Darmstadt.

Charles's eldest son, Louis, would become Grand Duke of Hesse and by the Rhine upon the death of Charles's childless brother, Louis III, three months later in 1877.

== Legacy ==
In 1916, his granddaughter Victoria described him in her memoirs:

My grandfather, Prince Charles, had always been delicate, suffering all his life from bronchitis and frequent migraines. He was very much of an invalid when I knew him and my grandmother took the greatest of care of him. They were a very devoted couple. He was a gentle person, lived a retired life and was very old fashioned in his habits. He was a good-looking man with a clean shaven face framed by side whiskers. He wore high cravats like stocks and fancy waistcoats and generally a frock coat. Out of doors in winter he always wore a black silk "respirator" over his mouth. He had a passion for collecting all kinds of odds and ends. [...] He was very kind to us little girls and we were fond of him.

== Issue ==
- Louis IV, Grand Duke of Hesse (12 September 1837 – 13 March 1892); Grand Duke of Hesse and by Rhine (13 June 1877 – 13 March 1892); married, firstly, Princess Alice of the United Kingdom and had issue. Married, secondly, Alexandrine von Hutten-Czapska; annulled.
- Prince Heinrich of Hesse and by Rhine (1838–1900); married, firstly morganatically, Baroness Caroline of Nidda and had issue. Married, secondly, also morganatically, Baroness Emilie of Dornberg and had issue.
- Princess Anna of Hesse and by the Rhine (1843–1865); married Friedrich Franz II, Grand Duke of Mecklenburg-Schwerin and had issue.
- Prince Wilhelm of Hesse and by Rhine (1845–1900); married Baroness Josephine of Lichtenberg and had issue.

== Ancestry ==
Ancestors of Prince Charles of Hesse and by Rhine

8. Louis IX, Landgrave of Hesse-Darmstadt (= 14)
4. Louis I, Grand Duke of Hesse and by Rhine
9. Countess Palatine Caroline of Zweibrücken (= 15)
2. Louis II, Grand Duke of Hesse and by Rhine
10. Prince George William of Hesse-Darmstadt
5. Princess Louise of Hesse-Darmstadt
11. Countess Maria Louise Albertine of Leiningen-Falkenburg-Dagsburg
1. Prince Charles of Hesse and by Rhine
12. Charles Frederick, Grand Duke of Baden
6. Charles Louis, Hereditary Prince of Baden
13. Princess Caroline Louise of Hesse-Darmstadt
3. Princess Wilhelmine of Baden
14. Louis IX, Landgrave of Hesse-Darmstadt (= 8)
7. Princess Amalie of Hesse-Darmstadt
15. Countess Palatine Caroline of Zweibrücken (= 9)
