= Princess Elisabeth of Prussia =

Elisabeth of Prussia
- Princess Charles of Hesse and by Rhine
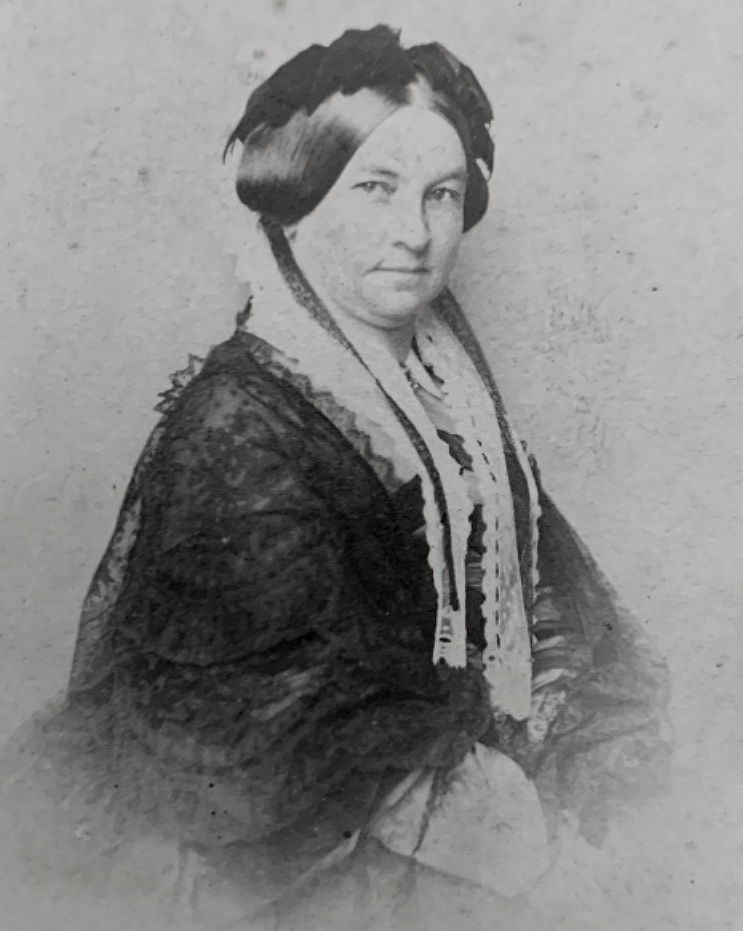
- Born: 18 June 1815; Berlin Palace, Kingdom of Prussia
- Died: 21 March 1885 (aged 69); Bessungen, Grand Duchy of Hesse, German Empire
- Spouse: Prince Charles of Hesse and by Rhine (m. 1836; died 1877)
- Issue: Louis IV, Grand Duke of Hesse and by Rhine; Prince Henry; Anna, Grand Duchess of Mecklenburg-Schwerin; Prince William
Names
- German: Marie Elisabeth Karoline Viktoria
- House: Hohenzollern
- Father: Prince Wilhelm of Prussia
- Mother: Princess Maria Anna of Hesse-Homburg

Princess Elisabeth of Prussia (18 June 1815 – 21 March 1885) was the second daughter of Prince Wilhelm of Prussia and Princess Maria Anna of Hesse-Homburg and a granddaughter of Frederick William II of Prussia. Through her eldest son Louis IV, Prince Philip, Duke of Edinburgh was her great-great-grandson, and she is consequently an ancestor of Charles III.

== Biography ==
Portrait of young Elisabeth, by Friedrich Jentzen, late 1830s.

Elisabeth was born in Berlin to Prince Wilhelm of Prussia and Princess Maria Anna of Hesse-Homburg, on the day of the Battle of Waterloo. Through her father, she was a granddaughter of Frederick William II of Prussia. Through her mother, she was a granddaughter of Frederick V, Landgrave of Hesse-Homburg. She was the fifth of seven surviving children. One of her sisters, Marie, became Queen of Bavaria. The family was relatively poor. Her dowry was only 3000 Thalers or £450.

Elisabeth had good relationship with her daughter-in-law, Alice. She lived to see her son ascend the throne as Grand Duke of Hesse and by Rhine on 13 June 1877 and to see Louis and Alice's two eldest daughters marry. Elisabeth and Charles' first great-grandchild, Princess Alice of Battenberg, was also born during her lifetime. In her later years, Elisabeth gained more weight and became obese. She died in Bessungen at the age of 69, outliving her husband by eight years.

Her granddaughter Victoria described her in her memoirs thirty years after her death:

My grandmother, Grossmama, we were rather in awe of when we were small, as she was always afraid our behaviour would be too uproarious for our grandfather. I only learned to appreciate her when I grew older, after my mother's death. She was very good to us, and we saw her often but she never interfered in our education carried on on the lines laid down by my mother. She was even shyer than my grandfather, very reserved, and deeply religious. Old fashioned in her views, she could be tolerant with young people's ideas. I can remember her listening with an amused smile at my lecture on Home Rule for Ireland and the advantages of socialism when I was about 16!

== Issue ==
Elisabeth married Prince Charles of Hesse and by Rhine, second son of Louis II, Grand Duke of Hesse, on 22 October 1836 in Berlin. She had four children:

- Louis IV, Grand Duke of Hesse and by Rhine (12 September 1837 – 13 March 1892); reigned from 13 June 1877 until his death; married, firstly, Princess Alice of the United Kingdom and had issue. Married, secondly, Alexandrine von Hutten-Czapska; annulled.
- Prince Henry of Hesse and by Rhine (28 November 1838 – 16 September 1900); married, firstly, Baroness Karoline of Nidda; had one son. Married, secondly, Baroness Emily of Dornberg; had one son.
- Princess Anna of Hesse and by Rhine (25 May 1843 – 16 April 1865); married Frederick Francis II, Grand Duke of Mecklenburg-Schwerin and had one daughter, Duchess Anna.
- Prince William of Hesse and by Rhine (16 November 1845 – 24 May 1900); married Baroness Josephine von Lichtenberg; had one son.

== Ancestry ==
Ancestors of Princess Elisabeth of Prussia

8. Prince Augustus William of Prussia
4. Frederick William II of Prussia
9. Duchess Luise of Brunswick-Wolfenbüttel
2. Prince Wilhelm of Prussia
10. Louis IX, Landgrave of Hesse-Darmstadt
5. Frederica Louisa of Hesse-Darmstadt
11. Countess Palatine Caroline of Zweibrücken
1. Princess Elisabeth of Prussia
12. Frederick IV, Landgrave of Hesse-Homburg
6. Frederick V, Landgrave of Hesse-Homburg
13. Princess Ulrike Louise of Solms-Braunfels
3. Princess Maria Anna of Hesse-Homburg
14. Louis IX, Landgrave of Hesse-Darmstadt (= 10)
7. Princess Caroline of Hesse-Darmstadt
15. Countess Palatine Caroline of Zweibrücken (= 11)
