= Prince Adalbert of Prussia (1811–1873) =

Prussian prince and admiral

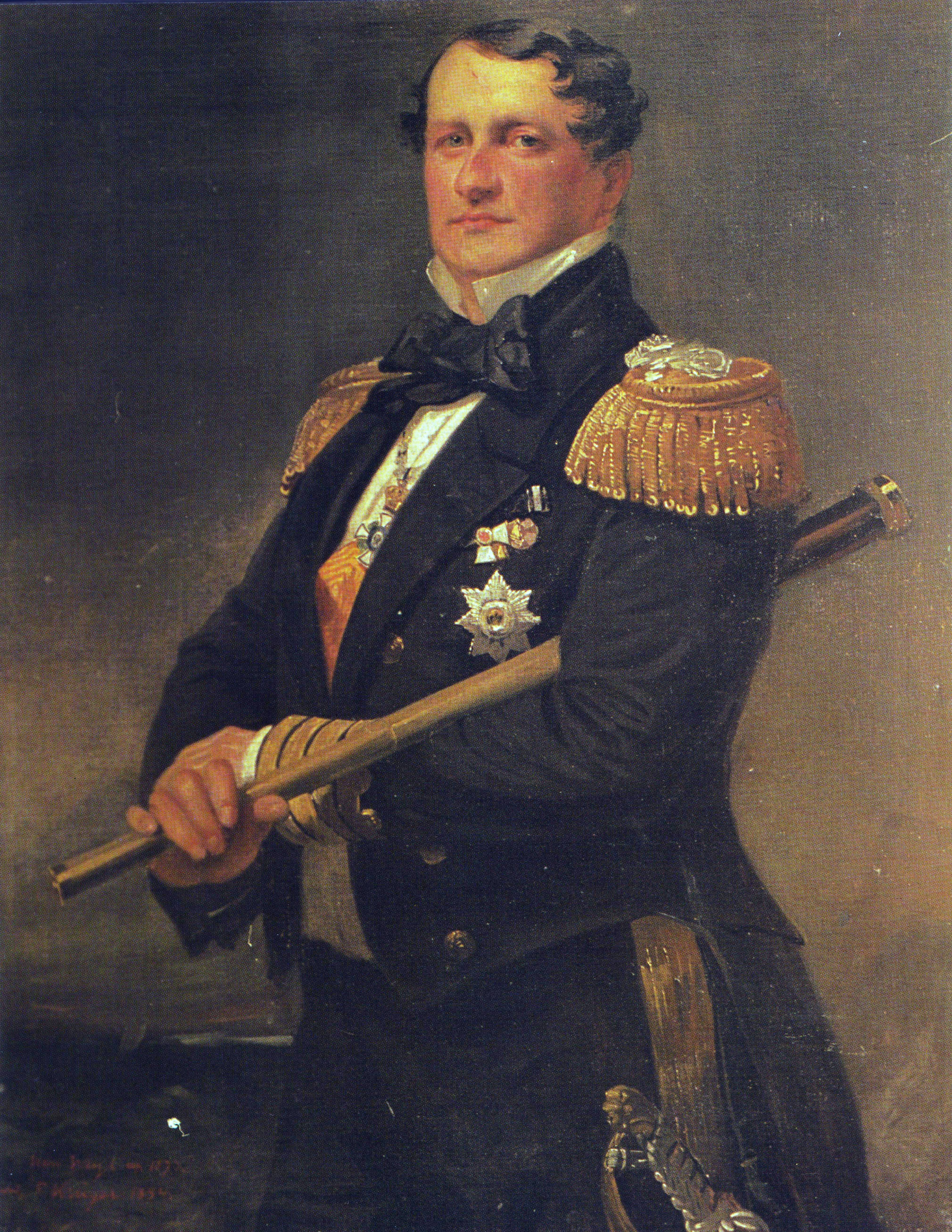
- Born: 29 October 1811; Berlin, Kingdom of Prussia
- Died: 6 June 1873 (aged 61); Karlsbad, Grand Duchy of Baden
- Spouse: Therese Elssler, Frau von Barnim (m. 1850)
- Issue: Adalbert, Freiherr von Barnim
Names
- English: Henry William Adalbert; German: Heinrich Wilhelm Adalbert
- House: Hohenzollern
- Father: Prince Wilhelm of Prussia
- Mother: Landgravine Marie Anna of Hesse-Homburg

Prince Heinrich Wilhelm Adalbert of Prussia (29 October 1811 – 6 June 1873) was the son of Prince Wilhelm of Prussia and Landgravine Marie Anna of Hesse-Homburg. He was a naval theorist and admiral. He was instrumental during the Revolutions of 1848 in founding the first unified German fleet, the Reichsflotte. During the 1850s, he helped to establish the Prussian Navy.

== Biography ==
Adalbert was born in Berlin, the son of Prince William, the youngest brother of King Frederick William III.

As a young man, Adalbert entered the Prussian army and by 1839, had become commander of the Guards Artillery brigade, a position he held until 1842. Several journeys led him between 1826 and 1842 to the Netherlands, Britain, Russia, the Ottoman Empire, Greece, and Brazil. He recognized during his many sea voyages the importance that sea power had for a modern commercial and industrial nation. He studied carefully the theory of naval warfare and in 1836 wrote a plan for the construction of a Prussian fleet, which would be centered on three 1,000-tonne (980-long-ton; 1,100-short-ton) paddle steamers. The cost of the ships meant that it had no chance of being enacted. Prussia at that time was a land power focused on Continental Europe, possessing practically no navy of its own; rather, it relied on the allied powers of Britain, the Netherlands, and Denmark. During the First Schleswig War of 1848–1851, however, the failure of this strategy became apparent: Britain and the Netherlands remained neutral and Denmark became the enemy. Within a few days, the Danish navy had destroyed German maritime commerce in the North Sea and the Baltic.

In 1843, upon returning from the cruise to Brazil, Adalbert was made the General Inspector of Artillery. He recruited then-Major Albrecht von Stosch as his adjutant in 1847; Stosch would go on to become the first chief of the German Imperial Admiralty in 1871.

During the Revolutions of 1848, and contemporaneously during the First Schleswig War against Denmark, the German National Assembly embarked on a project to establish a unified German fleet to combat the Danish blockade of the northern German states. The assembly named Prince Adalbert to lead the Technische-Marine-Commission (Naval Technical Commission), along with Karl Rudolf Brommy, Jan Schröder, among others; he was also placed in charge of Prussia's own initiative to build a fleet. He presented his recommendations in a "Memorandum on the Construction of a German Fleet" (Denkschrift über die Bildung einer deutschen Flotte) (Potsdam, 1848). In this memorandum, still regarded highly for its insights on naval strategy, Adalbert distinguished between three fleet models:

- A naval force intended solely for defensive actions in relation to coastal defense;
- An offensive naval force intended for national defense, and for the most necessary protection of commerce; or
- An independent naval power.

Adalbert favored the middle solution, because it would not provoke the great sea powers (such as Britain), but would provide the German navy with significant value as an ally.

In 1849 his cousin, King Frederick William IV, ordered Adalbert to resign his office in the fledgling Imperial Navy. The reactionary king mistrusted the National Assembly because of its revolutionary nature, and had already turned down its offer to assume the German Imperial crown. Despite the setback, Adalbert continued to give active support to the construction of a fleet.

In 1852 Adalbert argued that Prussia needed to build a naval base on the North Sea. He arranged the Jade Treaty of 20 July 1853, in which Prussia and the Grand Duchy of Oldenburg jointly withdrew from a region on the west bank of the Jade bay, where from 1854 onward Prussia established the fortress, naval base and city of Wilhelmshaven.

On 30 March 1854, Adalbert was named Admiral of the Prussian Coast and Commander-in-Chief of the Navy. In the summer of 1856, while on a training cruise of Prussian warships, he led Prussian forces at the Battle of Tres Forcas. He was shot by Riffians during the fighting.

During the Second Schleswig War of 1864 (also known as the "Danish-Prussian War") he commanded the Prussian Navy, though operational command of its main unit, the Baltic Squadron, fell to Eduard von Jachmann. He spent time aboard the aviso SMS Grille, and on 14 April he conducted a sweep into the Bay of Pomerania that resulted in an encounter with the Danish ship of the line Skjold and the steam frigate Sjælland. Grille opened fire at long range, leading to an indecisive two-and-a-half-hour battle in which Grille easily outran the more powerful Danish vessels and escaped back to Swinemünde.

After the Franco-Prussian War of 1870–1871, which led to the creation of the German Empire, Adalbert laid down his title of "Prince-Admiral" and retired from the now-renamed Imperial Navy. He died two years later of liver disease, aged 62, in Karlsbad.

Adalbert was married to the dancer Therese Elssler (Frau von Barnim); their only son, Adalbert v. Barnim (born 22 April 1841), died in July 1860 during an expedition on the Nile.

== Honours ==
He received the following orders and decorations:

- Kingdom of Prussia:
  - Knight of the Black Eagle, 29 October 1821; with Collar, 1829
  - Pour le Mérite (military), 31 July 1866
  - Grand Cross of the Red Eagle, with Oak Leaves and Swords on Ring
  - Knight of the Prussian Crown, 1st Class with Swords
  - Grand Commander's Cross of the Royal House Order of Hohenzollern
  - Iron Cross, 1st Class
  - Service Award Cross
- Hohenzollern: Cross of Honour of the Princely House Order of Hohenzollern, 1st Class with Swords
- Kingdom of Hanover:
  - Grand Cross of the Royal Guelphic Order, 1832
  - Knight of St. George, 1847
- Electorate of Hesse: Knight of the Golden Lion
- Ascanian duchies: Grand Cross of Albert the Bear, 29 November 1854
- Baden:
  - Knight of the House Order of Fidelity, 1852
  - Grand Cross of the Zähringer Lion, 1852
- Belgium: Grand Cordon of the Order of Leopold (military), 25 April 1867
- Kingdom of Bavaria:
  - Knight of St. Hubert, 1849
  - Grand Cross of the Military Merit Order
- Empire of Brazil: Grand Cross of the Southern Cross
- Kingdom of Greece: Grand Cross of the Redeemer
- Grand Duchy of Hesse:
  - Grand Cross of the Ludwig Order, 8 April 1841
  - Military Merit Cross
- Principality of Lippe: Military Merit Medal
- Mecklenburg:
  - Grand Cross of the Wendish Crown, with Crown in Ore
  - Military Merit Cross, 1st Class (Schwerin)
  - Cross for Distinction in War (Strelitz)
- Netherlands: Grand Cross of the Netherlands Lion
- Austrian Empire:
  - Military Merit Cross, with War Decoration
  - Grand Cross of St. Stephen
- Oldenburg: Grand Cross of the Order of Duke Peter Friedrich Ludwig, with Golden Crown, 21 August 1854
- Kingdom of Portugal: Grand Cross of the Tower and Sword
- Russian Empire:
  - Knight of St. Andrew
  - Knight of St. Alexander Nevsky
  - Knight of the White Eagle
  - Knight of St. Anna, 1st Class
  - Knight of St. Stanislaus, 1st Class
  - Knight of St. George, 4th Class
- Saxe-Weimar-Eisenach: Grand Cross of the White Falcon
- Württemberg: Grand Cross of the Württemberg Crown, 1864

== Ancestry ==
Ancestors of Prince Adalbert of Prussia (1811–1873)

8. Prince Augustus William of Prussia
4. Frederick William II of Prussia
9. Duchess Louise Amalie of Brunswick-Wolfenbüttel
2. Prince William of Prussia
10. Louis IX, Landgrave of Hesse-Darmstadt
5. Princess Frederika Louisa of Hesse-Darmstadt
11. Countess Palatine Caroline of Zweibrücken
1. Prince Adalbert of Prussia
12. Frederick IV, Landgrave of Hesse-Homburg
6. Frederick V, Landgrave of Hesse-Homburg
13. Princess Ulrike Louise of Solms-Braunfels
3. Landgravine Marie Anna of Hesse-Homburg
14. Louis IX, Landgrave of Hesse-Darmstadt (= 10)
7. Princess Caroline of Hesse-Darmstadt
15. Countess Palatine Caroline of Zweibrücken (= 11)
