= Princess Anna of Hesse and by Rhine =

Grand Duchess of Mecklenburg-Schwerin from 1864 to 1865

Anna of Hesse and by Rhine
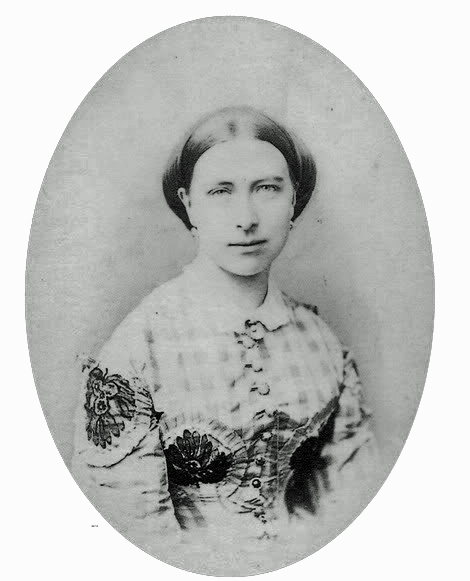
- Princess Anna c. 1860–1865

Grand Duchess consort of Mecklenburg-Schwerin
- Tenure: 4 July 1864 – 16 April 1865
- Born: 25 May 1843; Bessungen, Grand Duchy of Hesse
- Died: 16 April 1865 (aged 21); Schwerin, Mecklenburg-Schwerin
- Spouse: Frederick Francis II, Grand Duke of Mecklenburg (m. 1864)
- Issue: Duchess Anna of Mecklenburg-Schwerin
Names
- Maria Anna Wilhelmine Elisabeth Mathilde
- House: Hesse-Darmstadt
- Father: Prince Karl of Hesse and by Rhine
- Mother: Princess Elizabeth of Prussia

Princess Anna of Hesse and by Rhine (German: Prinzessin Anna von Hessen und bei Rhein; 25 May 1843 – 16 April 1865) was the consort and second wife of Friedrich Franz II, Grand Duke of Mecklenburg-Schwerin.

== Early life ==
Anna, the third child and only daughter of Prince Charles of Hesse and by Rhine, and Princess Elizabeth of Prussia, was born at Bessungen, Grand Duchy of Hesse. Her paternal grandfather was Louis II, Grand Duke of Hesse. Her mother was the granddaughter of King Frederick William II of Prussia.

Her eldest brother, Louis, married in 1862 to Princess Alice of the United Kingdom, third child and second daughter of Queen Victoria.

== Marriage ==
As a young girl, Anna was considered as a possible bride for the future Edward VII (known as 'Bertie' to his family). While his mother, Victoria, was in favor of Anna, Bertie's elder sister was opposed to the match, as she believed Anna had a "disturbing twitch". As time went by however, Victoria grew increasingly impatient, and tried to ignore her daughter's hints that Anna was not suitable, declaring, "I am much pleased with the account of Princess Anna, (minus the twitching)". In the end, Alexandra of Denmark was chosen instead.

On 4 July 1864 in Darmstadt, Anna married Frederick Francis son of Paul Frederick, Grand Duke of Mecklenburg-Schwerin, who was her second cousin (Friedrich Franz's first wife, Princess Augusta Reuss of Köstritz, had died in 1862). Together, they had one daughter:

- HH Duchess Anna Elisabeth Auguste Alexandrine of Mecklenburg-Schwerin (7 April 1865 – 8 February 1882).

Her niece wrote about her and her daughter:

They had only one little girl, Annchen, who died at 16. This was a very delicate and nervous child. We used to play with her when she paid her yearly visit to my grandparents but we were so much more robust than she and so wild that my grandmother used always to forbid us exciting her.

== Death ==
Anna died of puerperal fever a week after giving birth to her only child. She was buried at the Schwerin Cathedral. Her husband remarried to Princess Marie of Schwarzburg-Rudolstadt.

== Sources ==
- Pakula, Hannah (1995). An Uncommon Woman: The Empress Frederick, Daughter of Queen Victoria, Wife of the Crown Prince of Prussia, Mother of Kaiser Wilhelm. New York: Simon and Schuster. ISBN 0-684-84216-5.
- thePeerage.com Anne Prinzessin von Hessen und bei Rhein

Princess Anna of Hesse and by Rhine House of Hesse-Darmstadt Cadet branch of the House of Hesse Born: 25 May 1843 Died: 16 April 1865
German royalty
Vacant Title last held by Princess Augusta Reuss of Köstritz	Grand Duchess consort of Mecklenburg-Schwerin; 4 July 1864 – 16 April 1865	Vacant Title next held by Princess Marie of Schwarzburg-Rudolstadt
