= Prince Wilhelm of Prussia (1783–1851) =

Son of Frederick William II of Prussia (1783–1851)

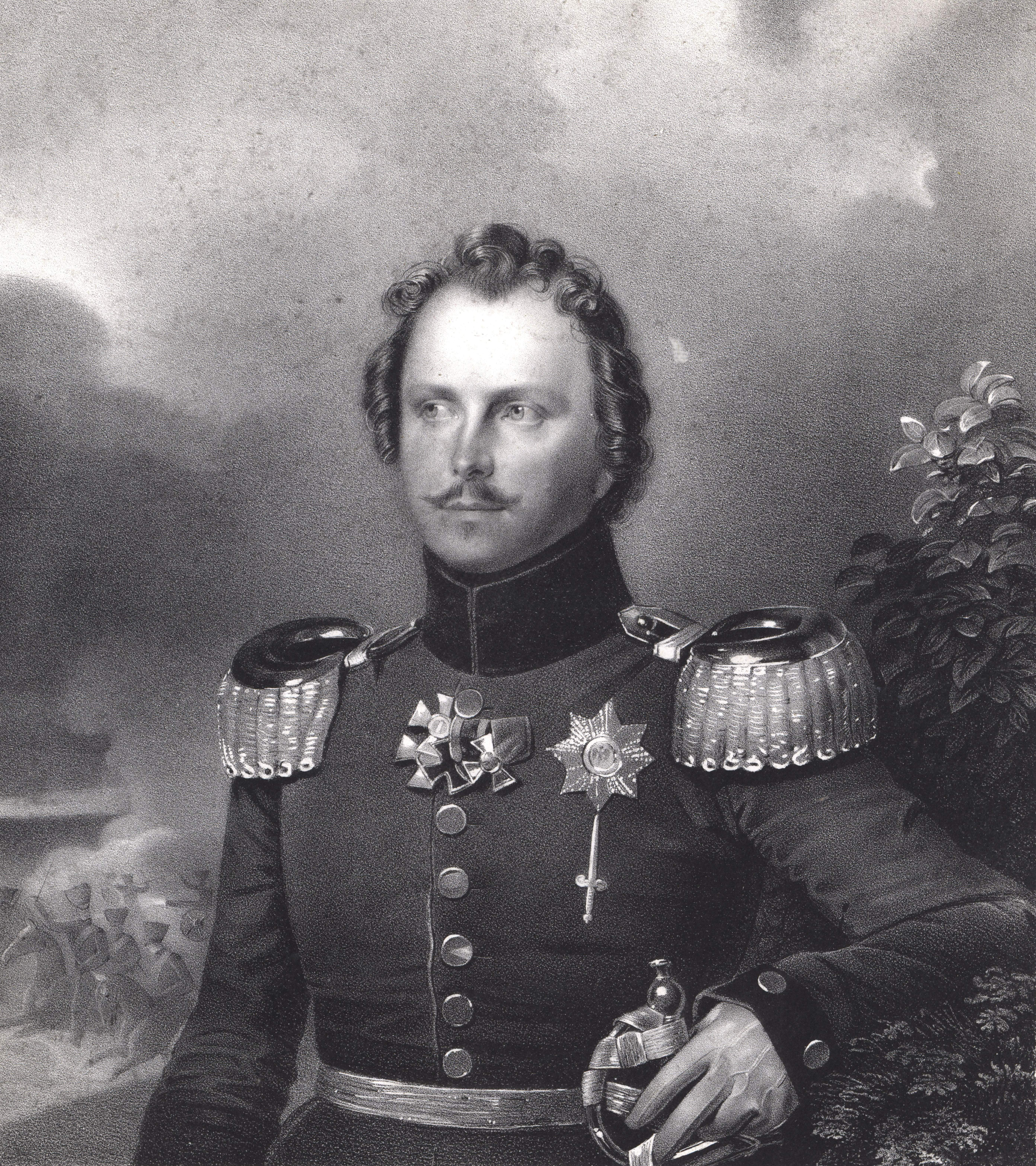
- Born: 3 July 1783; Berlin
- Died: 28 September 1851 (aged 68); Berlin
- Spouse: Marie Anna of Hesse-Homburg (m. 1804; died 1846)
- Issue among others...: Prince Adalbert; Elisabeth, Princess Karl of Hesse and by Rhine; Prince Waldemar; Marie, Queen of Bavaria
Names
- German: Friedrich Wilhelm Karl; English: Frederick William Charles
- House: Hohenzollern
- Father: Frederick William II of Prussia
- Mother: Frederika Louisa of Hesse-Darmstadt
- Religion: Calvinism (1783–1817); Evangelical Christian Church (1817–1851)

Prince Friedrich Wilhelm Karl of Prussia (3 July 1783 – 28 September 1851) was the son of Frederick William II of Prussia and Frederika Louisa of Hesse-Darmstadt.

== Life ==
Prince William was the fourth and youngest son of King Frederick William II of Prussia and Princess Frederika Louisa of Hesse-Darmstadt. He served in the Guards from 1799 and fought in 1806 at the head of a cavalry brigade at Battle of Jena and Auerstedt. In December 1807, he traveled to Paris, to try to reduce the war burdens imposed on Prussia by Napoléon Bonaparte; he only managed to obtain a modest reduction. In 1808, he represented Prussia at the Congress of Erfurt. At the end of 1808, he accompanied his brother, King Frederick William III to St. Petersburg. Later, he had a prominent role in the transformation of Prussia and its army.

During the War of the Sixth Coalition of 1813, he was stationed in Blücher's headquarters. In the Battle of Lützen (1813) on 2 May, he commanded the reserve cavalry in the left wing of the army and during the Battle of Leipzig, he negotiated the union of the Northern army with Blucher's. Later he led the 8th Brigade of the Yorck's army corps on the Rhine and distinguished himself by bravery and military skills at the battles of Château-Thierry, Laon and outside Paris.

After the Treaty of Paris (1814), the Prince accompanied the king to London and then attended the negotiations of the Congress of Vienna. In 1815 during the Waterloo Campaign he commanded the reserve cavalry of the Prussian IV Corps (Bülow's). After the second Treaty of Paris, he lived mostly in Paris and sometimes at his Fischbach Castle in Kowary in the Riesengebirge mountains.

From 1824 to 1829 he was governor of the Confederate Fortress at Mainz; from 1830 to 1831 he was governor-general of the Rhine Province and Westphalia. In this capacity, on 20 September 1831 he opened the first rail line on German soil from Hinsbeck via the Deilbach valley to Nierenhof. Until then, the line had been called Deilthaler Eisenbahn ("Deil Valley Railway"); after its opening it was allowed to call itself Prinz-Wilhelm-Eisenbahn-Gesellschaft.

In March 1834 he was appointed general of cavalry and re-appointed as governor of the federal fortress at Mainz. He should not be confused with his nephew of the same name, the future emperor William I, who was governor of the same fortress in 1854.

After the death of his wife, Marie Anna, on 14 April 1846, he withdrew from public life to his Fischbach castle.

== Marriage and issue ==
He married his first cousin Landgravine Marie Anna of Hesse-Homburg, daughter of Frederick V, Landgrave of Hesse-Homburg, and Caroline of Hesse-Darmstadt (his mother's sister). Together they had nine children:

- Princess Amalie Friederike Luise Karoline Wilhelmine of Prussia (4 July 1805 – 23 November 1805); died in infancy.
- Princess Irene of Prussia (born and died 3 November 1806); stillborn.
- Unnamed son (born and died 30 August 1809); stillborn.
- Prince Friedrich Tassilo Wilhelm of Prussia (29 October 1811 – 9 January 1813); died in infancy.
- Prince Heinrich Wilhelm Adalbert of Prussia (29 October 1811 – 6 June 1873); married morganatically, in 1850, Therese Elssler and had issue.
- Prince Friedrich Wilhelm Tassilo of Prussia (15 November 1813 – 9 January 1814); died in infancy.
- Princess Marie Elisabeth Karoline Viktoria of Prussia (18 June 1815 – 21 March 1885); married, in 1836, Prince Karl of Hesse and by Rhine and had issue.
- Prince Friedrich Wilhelm Waldemar of Prussia (2 August 1817 – 17 February 1849), never married.
- Princess Marie Friederike Franziska Hedwig of Prussia (15 October 1825 – 17 May 1889); married, in 1842, King Maximilian II of Bavaria and had issue.

== Honours ==
He received the following orders and decorations:

- Kingdom of Prussia:
  - Knight of the Black Eagle, 31 December 1793; with Collar, 1801
  - Pour le Mérite (military), with Oak Leaves, 18 December 1846
  - Iron Cross (1813) "Honour Senior", 2nd Class
  - Service Award Cross
- Austrian Empire:
  - Commander of the Military Order of Maria Theresa, 1814
  - Grand Cross of St. Stephen, 1829
- Kingdom of Bavaria: Knight of St. Hubert, 1842
- Belgium: Grand Cordon of the Order of Leopold, 17 December 1841
- (Saxe-Coburg and Gotha) (Duchy of Saxe-Altenburg) (Saxe-Meiningen) Ernestine duchies: Grand Cross of the Saxe-Ernestine House Order
- Kingdom of Hanover: Knight of St. George, 1840
- Electorate of Hesse: Grand Cross of the Golden Lion
- Grand Duchy of Hesse: Grand Cross of the Ludwig Order
- Hohenzollern: Cross of Honour of the Princely House Order of Hohenzollern, 1st Class
- Netherlands: Grand Cross of the Military William Order, 8 July 1815
- Russian Empire:
  - Knight of St. George, 3rd Class, 20 May 1813
  - Knight of St. Andrew
  - Knight of St. Vladimir, 2nd Class
- Saxe-Weimar-Eisenach: Grand Cross of the White Falcon, 11 June 1829
- Sweden: Grand Cross of the Sword, 1st Class, 24 April 1814
- United Kingdom: Honorary Grand Cross of the Bath (military), 18 August 1843
- Württemberg: Grand Cross of the Württemberg Crown

== Ancestors ==
Ancestors of Prince Wilhelm of Prussia (1783–1851)

8. Frederick William I of Prussia
4. Prince Augustus William of Prussia
9. Princess Sophia Dorothea of Hanover
2. Frederick William II of Prussia
10. Ferdinand Albert II, Duke of Brunswick-Wolfenbüttel
5. Duchess Luise of Brunswick-Wolfenbüttel
11. Princess Antoinette of Brunswick-Wolfenbüttel
1. Prince Wilhelm of Prussia
12. Louis VIII, Landgrave of Hesse-Darmstadt
6. Louis IX, Landgrave of Hesse-Darmstadt
13. Countess Charlotte of Hanau-Lichtenberg
3. Princess Frederica Louisa of Hesse-Darmstadt
14. Christian III, Count Palatine of Zweibrücken
7. Countess Palatine Caroline of Zweibrücken
15. Countess Caroline of Nassau-Saarbrücken

== Siblings ==
- Frederica Charlotte (1767–1820), who became Duchess of York by her marriage to Frederick, Duke of York
- Frederick William III of Prussia (1770–1840)
- Christine (1772–73)
- Louis Charles (1773–96)
- Frederica Louisa Wilhelmina (1774–1837), wife of William of Orange, afterwards King William I of the Netherlands
- Augusta (1780–1841), wife of William II, Elector of Hesse
- Henry (1781–1846)
