= Princess Maria Anna of Hesse-Homburg =

Princess Maria Anna
- Princess Wilhelm of Prussia
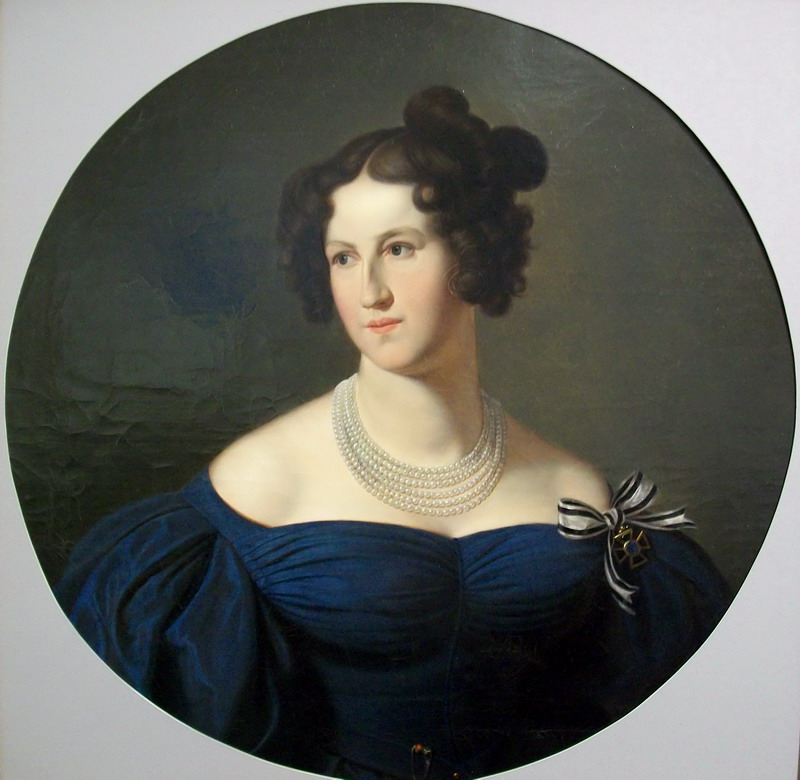
- 1820 oil painting by Wilhelm Schadow
- Born: 13 October 1785; Bad Homburg vor der Höhe
- Died: 14 April 1846 (aged 60); Berlin
- Spouse: Prince Wilhelm of Prussia (m. 1804)
- Issue …Details: Prince Adalbert; Elisabeth, Princess Karl of Hesse and by Rhine; Prince Waldemar; Marie, Queen of Bavaria
- House: Hesse
- Father: Frederick V, Landgrave of Hesse-Homburg
- Mother: Caroline of Hesse-Darmstadt

Princess Maria Anna of Hesse-Homburg (13 October 1785, Bad Homburg vor der Höhe – 14 April 1846, Berlin) was a German noblewoman. She was the most senior woman at the Prussian court from 1810 to 1823. She was styled as "Princess Wilhelm of Prussia".

== Life ==
She was the twelfth child (and sixth daughter) of Frederick V, Landgrave of Hesse-Homburg and Caroline of Hesse-Darmstadt, thus being a granddaughter of Countess Palatine Caroline of Zweibrücken, known as the "great Landgräfin".

Maria Anna belonged to the anti-Napoleon-party around Queen Luise and supported the war against France in 1806. She followed the royal house in its escape from the French occupation.

After the death of Queen Luise in 1810, she acted as first lady on official occasions. In March 1813, she proclaimed the famous "Aufruf der königlichen Prinzessinnen an die Frauen im preußischen Staate" and founded the patriotic women's association "Vaterländischen Frauenverein." She corresponded with Freiherr vom Stein, von Hardenberg and the Humboldt brothers and was an acquaintance of the poet Friedrich de la Motte Fouqué. In 1822, she was in love with Count Anton of Stolberg-Wernigerode, who later became Prussian Minister of State. She was active in prison care at the Berliner Gefängnisinsassen and founded an orphanage in Pankow in Berlin.

== Marriage and issue ==
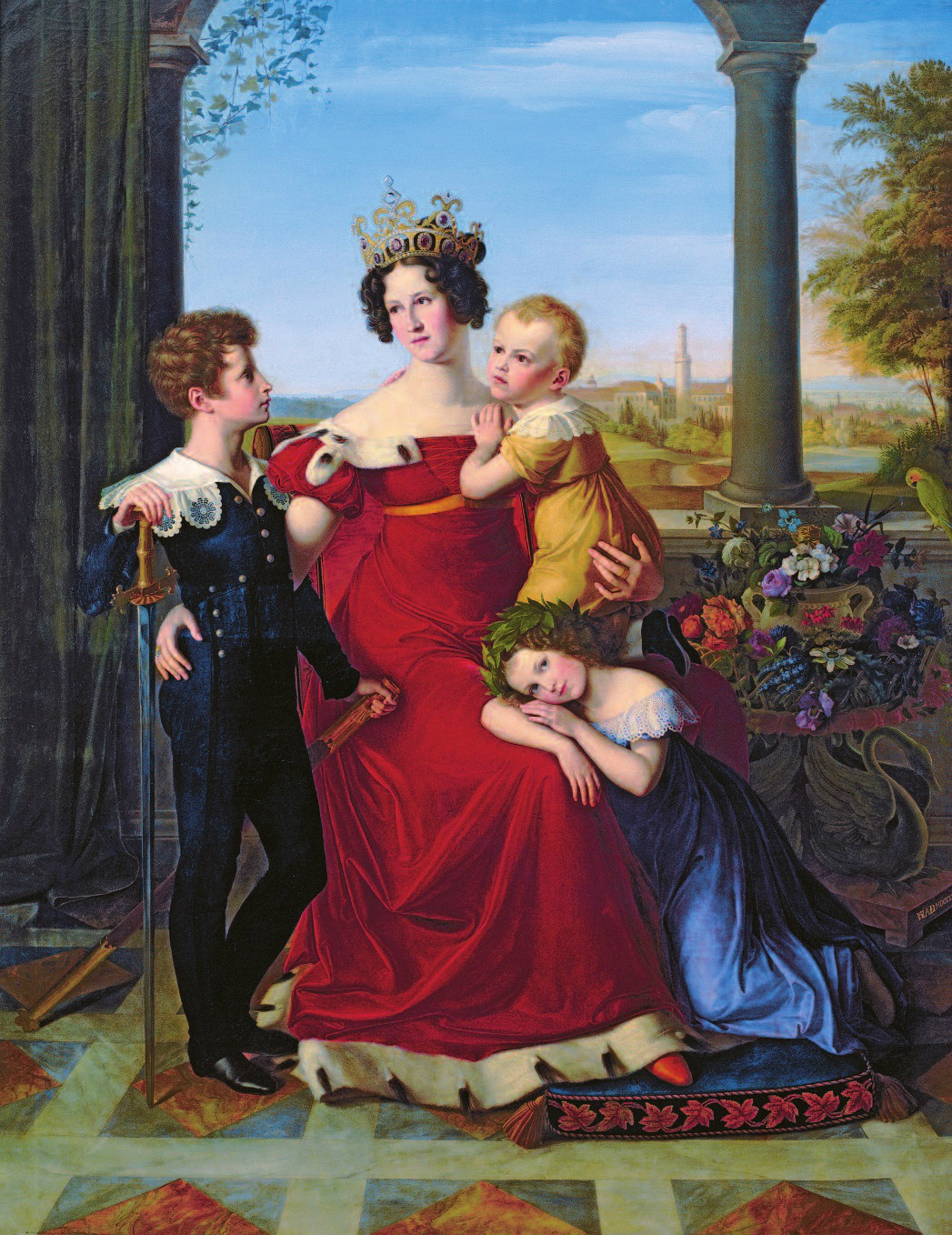
Maria Anna with her children: Adalbert, Elisabeth and Waldemar. By Friedrich Wilhelm Schadow, 1822.

She married in 1804 to Prince Wilhelm of Prussia (1783–1851), her first cousin, and they had nine children:

- Princess Amalie Friederike Luise Karoline Wilhelmine of Prussia (4 July 1805 – 23 November 1805); died in infancy.
- Princess Irene of Prussia (born and died 3 November 1806); stillborn.
- Unnamed son (born and died 30 August 1809); stillborn.
- Prince Friedrich Tassilo Wilhelm of Prussia (29 October 1811 – 9 January 1813); died in infancy.
- Prince Heinrich Wilhelm Adalbert of Prussia (29 October 1811 – 6 June 1873); married morganatically, in 1850, Therese Elssler and had issue.
- Prince Friedrich Wilhelm Tassilo of Prussia (15 November 1813 – 9 January 1814); died in infancy.
- Princess Marie Elisabeth Karoline Viktoria of Prussia (18 June 1815 – 21 March 1885); married, in 1836, Prince Karl of Hesse and by Rhine and had issue.
- Prince Friedrich Wilhelm Waldemar of Prussia (2 August 1817 – 17 February 1849), never married.
- Princess Marie Friederike Franziska Hedwig of Prussia (15 October 1825 – 17 May 1889); married, in 1842, King Maximilian II of Bavaria and had issue.

== Ancestry ==
Ancestors of Princess Maria Anna of Hesse-Homburg

8. Prince Casimir William of Hesse-Homburg
4. Frederick IV, Landgrave of Hesse-Homburg
9. Countess Christine Charlotte of Solms-Braunfels
2. Frederick V, Landgrave of Hesse-Homburg
10. Frederick William, Prince of Solms-Braunfels
5. Princess Ulrike Louise of Solms-Braunfels
11. Countess Sophie Magdalena Benigna of Solms-Laubach-Utphe
1. Princess Maria Anna of Hesse-Homburg
12. Louis VIII, Landgrave of Hesse-Darmstadt
6. Louis IX, Landgrave of Hesse-Darmstadt
13. Countess Charlotte of Hanau-Lichtenberg
3. Princess Caroline of Hesse-Darmstadt
14. Christian III, Count Palatine of Zweibrücken
7. Countess Palatine Caroline of Zweibrücken
15. Countess Caroline of Nassau-Saarbrücken

== Bibliography ==
- Horst Häker (Hrsg.): Tagebuch der Prinzessin Marianne von Preußen. (= Heilbronner Kleist-Editionen; 1). Kleist-Archiv Sembdner, Heilbronn 2006, ISBN 3-931060-97-7
- Stefan Hartmann (1990). "Marianne". Neue Deutsche Biographie (in German). Vol. 16. Berlin: Duncker & Humblot. pp. 210–211. (full text online).
- Hermann von Petersdorff (1906). "Marianne, Prinzessin von Preußen" . Allgemeine Deutsche Biographie (in German). Vol. 52. Leipzig: Duncker & Humblot. pp. 202–210.
- Karl Schwartz: Landgraf Friedrich V. von Hessen-Homburg und seine Familie. Aus Archivalien und Familienpapieren. Rudolstadt 1878
