= Marie of Prussia =

Queen of Bavaria from 1848 to 1864

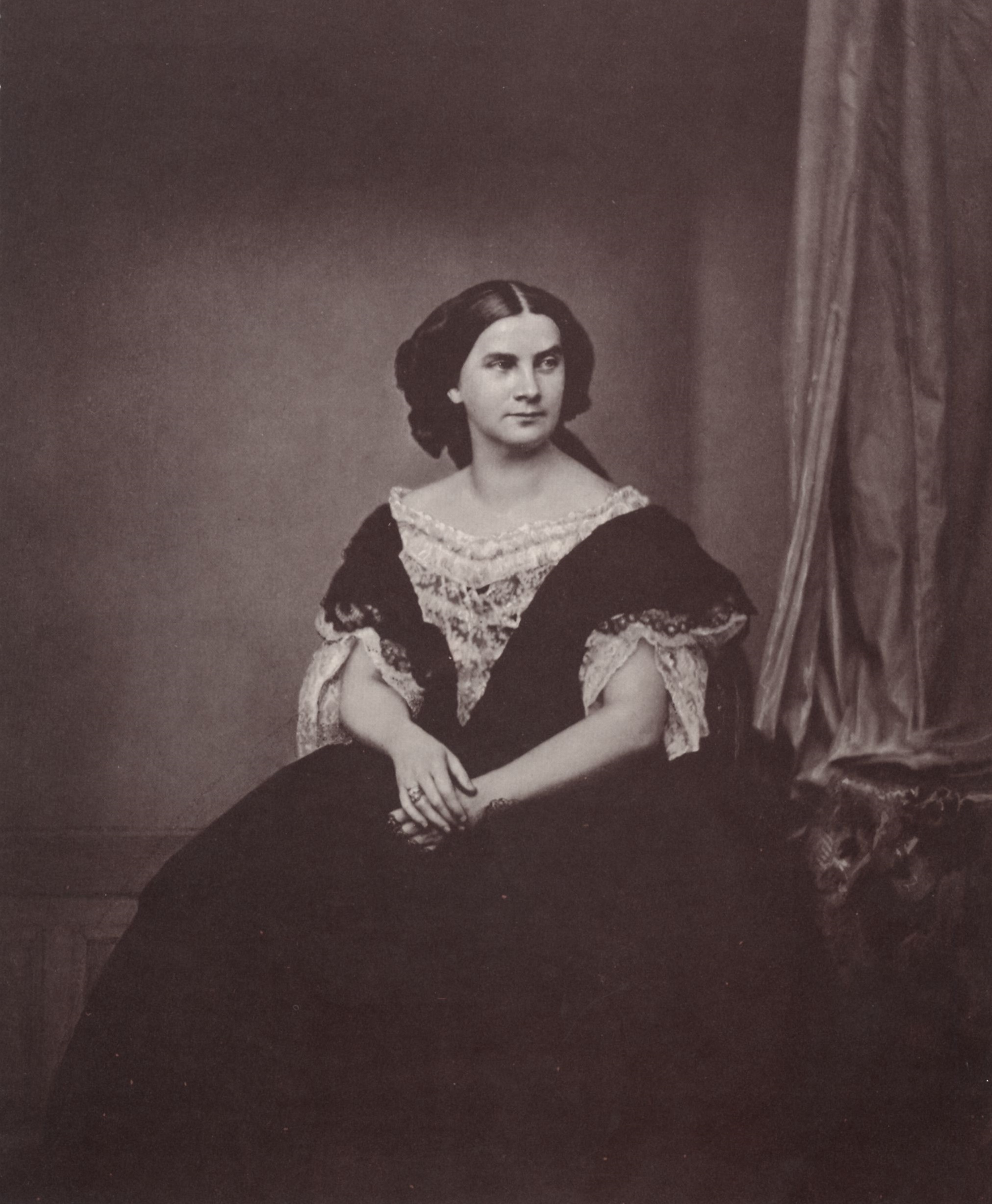
- Queen Marie in middle age, 1860s

Queen consort of Bavaria
- Tenure: 28 March 1848 – 10 March 1864
- Born: 15 October 1825; Berlin City Palace, Prussia
- Died: 17 May 1889 (aged 63); Hohenschwangau Castle, Bavaria
- Burial: Theatine Church
- Spouse: Maximilian II of Bavaria (m. 1842; died 1864)
- Issue: Ludwig II; Otto I
- House: Hohenzollern (by birth); Wittelsbach (by marriage)
- Father: Prince Wilhelm of Prussia
- Mother: Princess Maria Anna of Hesse-Homburg

Marie of Prussia (German: Marie Friederike Franziska Auguste Hedwig von Preußen; 15 October 1825 – 17 May 1889) was Queen of Bavaria by marriage to Maximilian II of Bavaria, and the mother of Kings Ludwig II and Otto of Bavaria.

== Life ==
Born and raised in Berlin, Marie was the daughter of Prince Wilhelm of Prussia and Landgravine Marie Anna of Hesse-Homburg. Her uncle was King Friedrich Wilhelm III of Prussia. The family spent half of the year at Fischbach (today Karpniki) Castle in Silesia, where they loved to hike in the Giant Mountains.

In her youth, Marie was seriously considered as a wife for Ernest II, Duke of Saxe-Coburg and Gotha, until her engagement to Maximilian was announced.

=== Queen ===
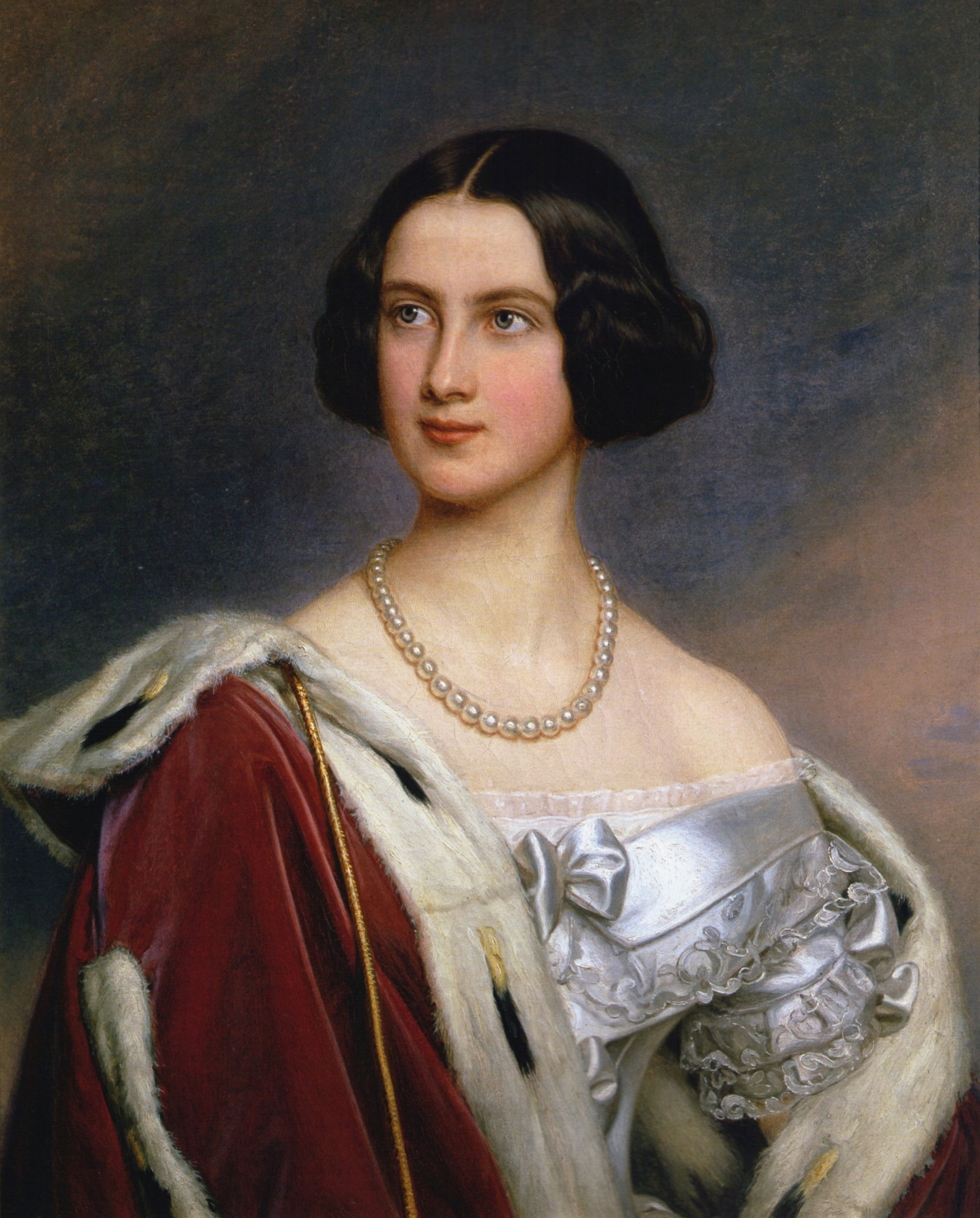
Marie of Prussia as Crown Princess of Bavaria, by Joseph Karl Stieler, 1843, Gallery of Beauties, Nymphenburg Palace

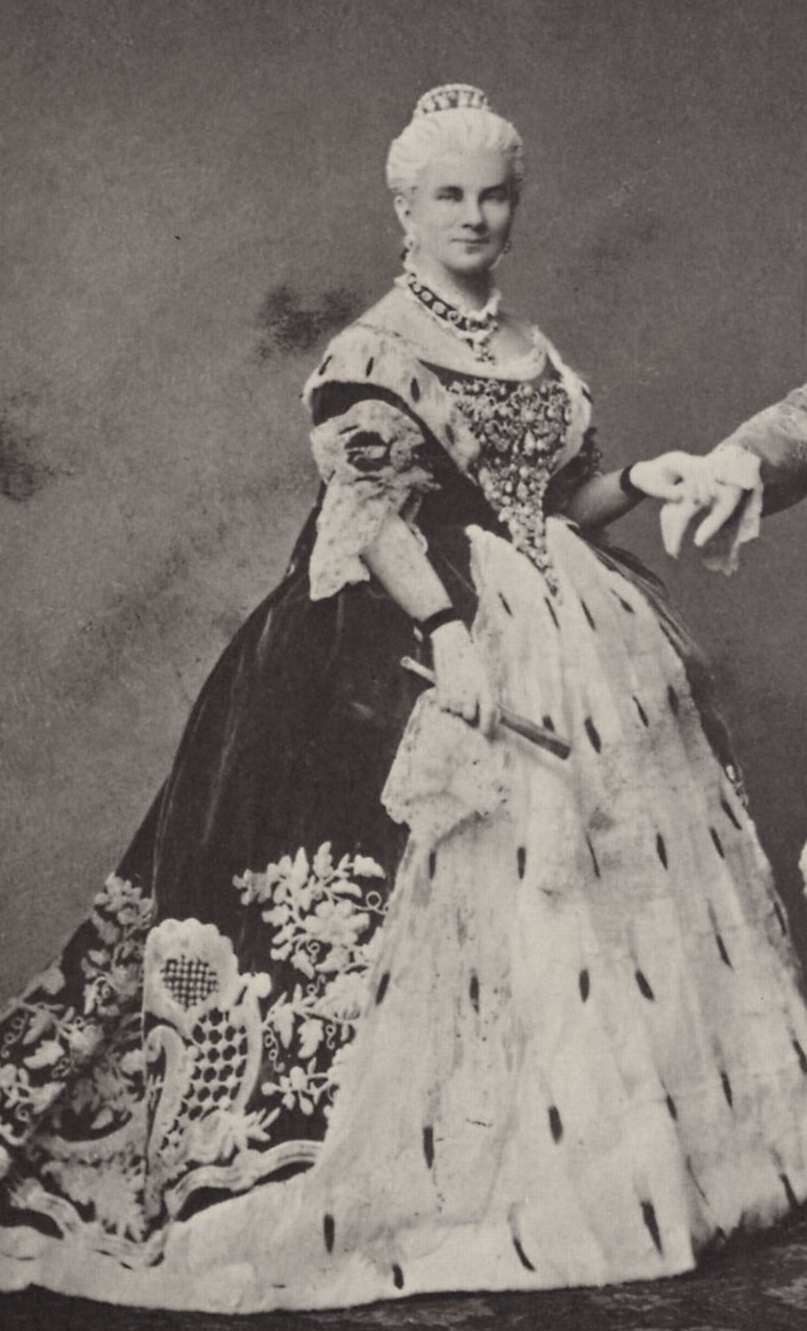
Queen Marie of Bavaria, 1864

On 12 October 1842, she married the Crown Prince, and later King of Bavaria, Maximilian II.

Marie was loved equally by both the Catholic and Protestant populations. (At that time, Bavaria was mostly Catholic, whilst Prussia was mostly Evangelical.) A specific emphasis of her "great social engagement" was a reactivation of the Bavarian Women's Association, which took place on 18 December 1869 with the aid of her son, Ludwig II. Its aim was "Pflege und Unterstützung der im Felde verwundeten und erkrankten Krieger" (Care and support of soldiers wounded and injured in the field). The Bavarian Red Cross was officially founded as a result of the Bavarian Women's Association. The Red Cross eventually took over for the Queen.

=== Queen dowager ===
With the sudden death of Maximilian II on 10 March 1864, Marie became a widow. On 12 October 1874, she converted to Catholicism.

As a widow she lived at Nymphenburg Palace. She spent her summer holidays at Schloss Hohenschwangau near Füssen, a castle her husband had redecorated in Gothic Revival style, and at her country estate in Elbigenalp in the Lechtal Alps. She enjoyed hiking the mountains, which she had often done with her sons when they were young. Marie looked after her second son Otto, who was declared insane. She outlived her elder son, Ludwig II, by nearly three years; his unusual death occurring on 13 June 1886. Marie died 17 May 1889 in Hohenschwangau.

Marie is interred in the Theatine Church in Munich in a side chapel opposite her husband.

== Issue ==
Marie and Maximilian had:

- Ludwig II of Bavaria (25 August 1845 – 13 June 1886); succeeded as King of Bavaria as Ludwig II. Declared mentally incompetent without examination and deposed in a coup in favour of his uncle, Prince Luitpold, on 10 June 1886; died under disputed circumstances.
- Otto I of Bavaria (27 April 1848 – 11 October 1916); succeeded as King of Bavaria as Otto I, but reigned only in name due to the regency of his uncle, Prince Luitpold. Declared mentally incompetent and deposed on 5 November 1913 by his cousin Prince Ludwig, later King Ludwig III of Bavaria.

== Honours ==
- Kingdom of Bavaria: Grand Mistress of the Order of Theresa
- Kingdom of Prussia:
  - Dame of the Order of Louise, 1st Division
  - Cross of Merit for Women and Girls
- Spain: Dame of the Order of Queen Maria Luisa, 17 June 1856
- Kingdom of Saxony: Dame of the Order of Sidonia, 1871

== Sources ==
- Freitag, Sabine; Mösslang, Markus; Wende, Peter, eds. (2002). British Envoys to Germany 1816-1866. Vol. 2, 1830–1847. Cambridge University Press. ISBN 978-0521818681.
- Hamann, Brigitte (1986). The Reluctant Empress: A Biography of Empress Elisabeth of Austria. Alfred A. Knopf. ISBN 0-394-53717-3.
- da Silva, Suriani (2017). Machado De Assis's Philosopher or Dog?: From Serial to Book Form. Routledge. ISBN 9781351559577.

Marie of Prussia House of Hohenzollern Born: 15 October 1825 Died: 17 May 1889
German royalty
Preceded by Therese of Saxe-Hildburghausen	Queen consort of Bavaria; 28 March 1848 – 10 March 1864	Vacant Title next held by Maria Theresa of Austria-Este
