= Louis IV of Hesse =

Grand Duke of Hesse and by Rhine from 1877 to 1892

Louis IV
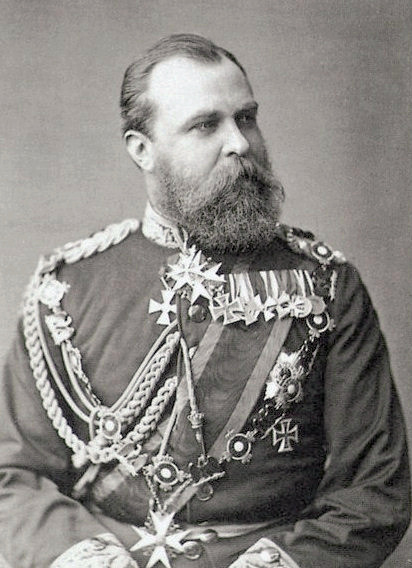
- Ludwig IV, 1878

Grand Duke of Hesse and by Rhine
- Reign: 13 June 1877 – 13 March 1892
- Predecessor: Louis III
- Successor: Ernest Louis
- Born: 12 September 1837; Prinz-Carl-Palais, Darmstadt, Grand Duchy of Hesse, German Confederation
- Died: 13 March 1892 (aged 54); New Palace, Darmstadt, Grand Duchy of Hesse, German Empire
- Burial: 17 March 1892; Rosenhöhe, Darmstadt, Grand Duchy of Hesse, German Empire
- Spouse: Princess Alice of the United Kingdom (m. 1862; died 1878); Countess Alexandrine von Hutten-Czapska (m. 1884; ann. 1884)
- Issue: Victoria Mountbatten, Marchioness of Milford Haven; Grand Duchess Elizabeth Feodorovna of Russia; Irene, Princess Henry of Prussia; Ernest Louis, Grand Duke of Hesse and by Rhine; Prince Friedrich; Alexandra Feodorovna, Empress of Russia; Princess Marie
Names
- German: Friedrich Wilhelm Ludwig Karl; Frederick William Louis Charles
- House: Hesse-Darmstadt
- Father: Prince Charles of Hesse and by Rhine
- Mother: Princess Elisabeth of Prussia

Louis IV (German: Ludwig IV. Großherzog von Hessen und bei Rhein; 12 September 1837 – 13 March 1892) was the Grand Duke of Hesse and by Rhine from 13 June 1877 until his death in 1892. Through his marriage to Queen Victoria's second daughter Alice, he was connected to the British royal family. Two of his daughters married into the House of Romanov.

== Early life ==
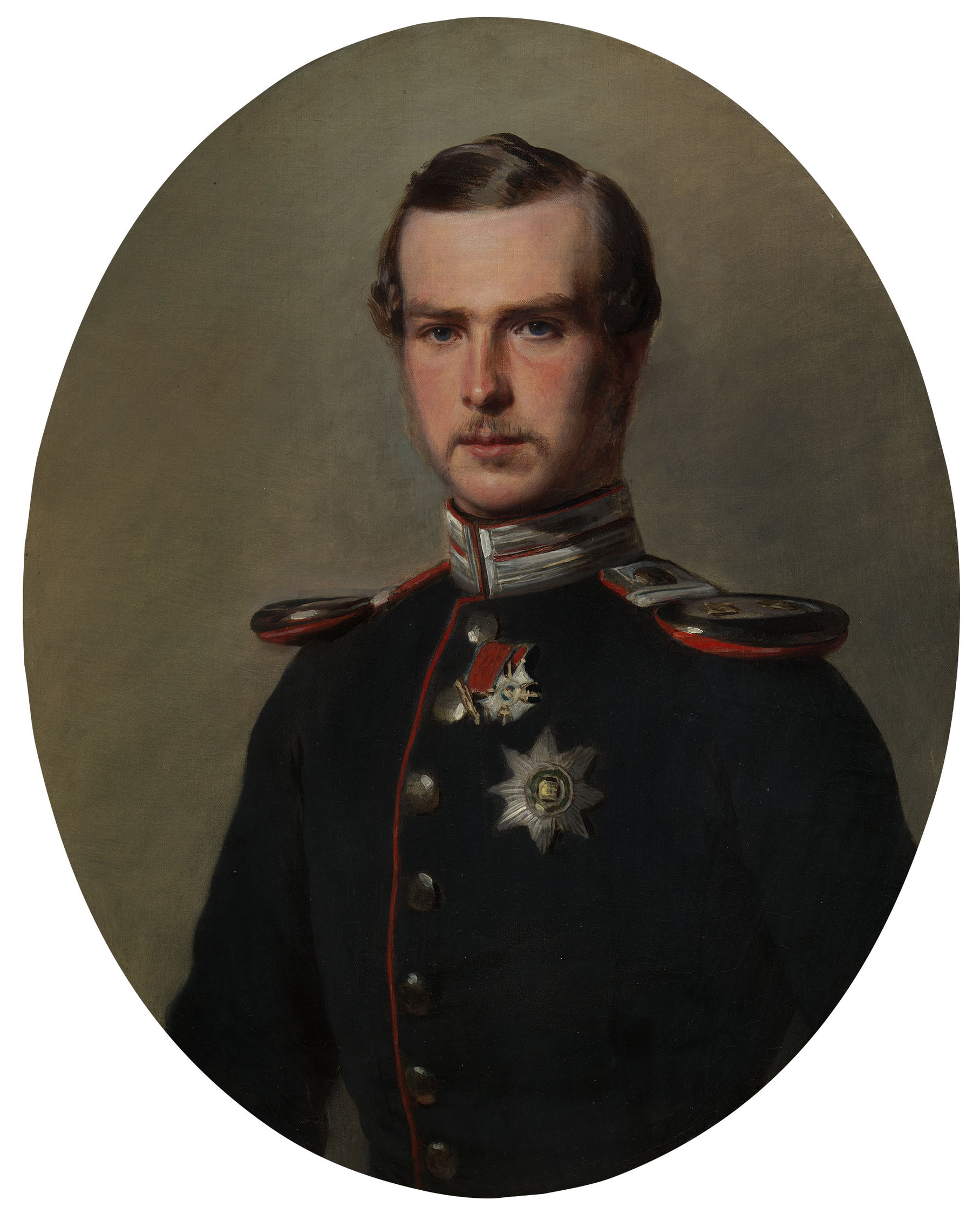
Portrait of Louis IV as Prince Louis of Hesse by Franz Xaver Winterhalter (1861)

Louis was born at the Prinz-Karl-Palais in Darmstadt, the capital of the Grand Duchy of Hesse and by Rhine in the German Confederation, the first son and child of Prince Charles of Hesse and by Rhine and Princess Elisabeth of Prussia, granddaughter of King Frederick William II of Prussia. As his father's elder brother Louis III, the future Grand Duke of Hesse and by Rhine, had been married to his first wife since 1833 without legitimate children and from 1868 was married morganatically, Prince Louis was from birth third-in-line to the grand ducal throne, after his uncle and father.

== First marriage ==
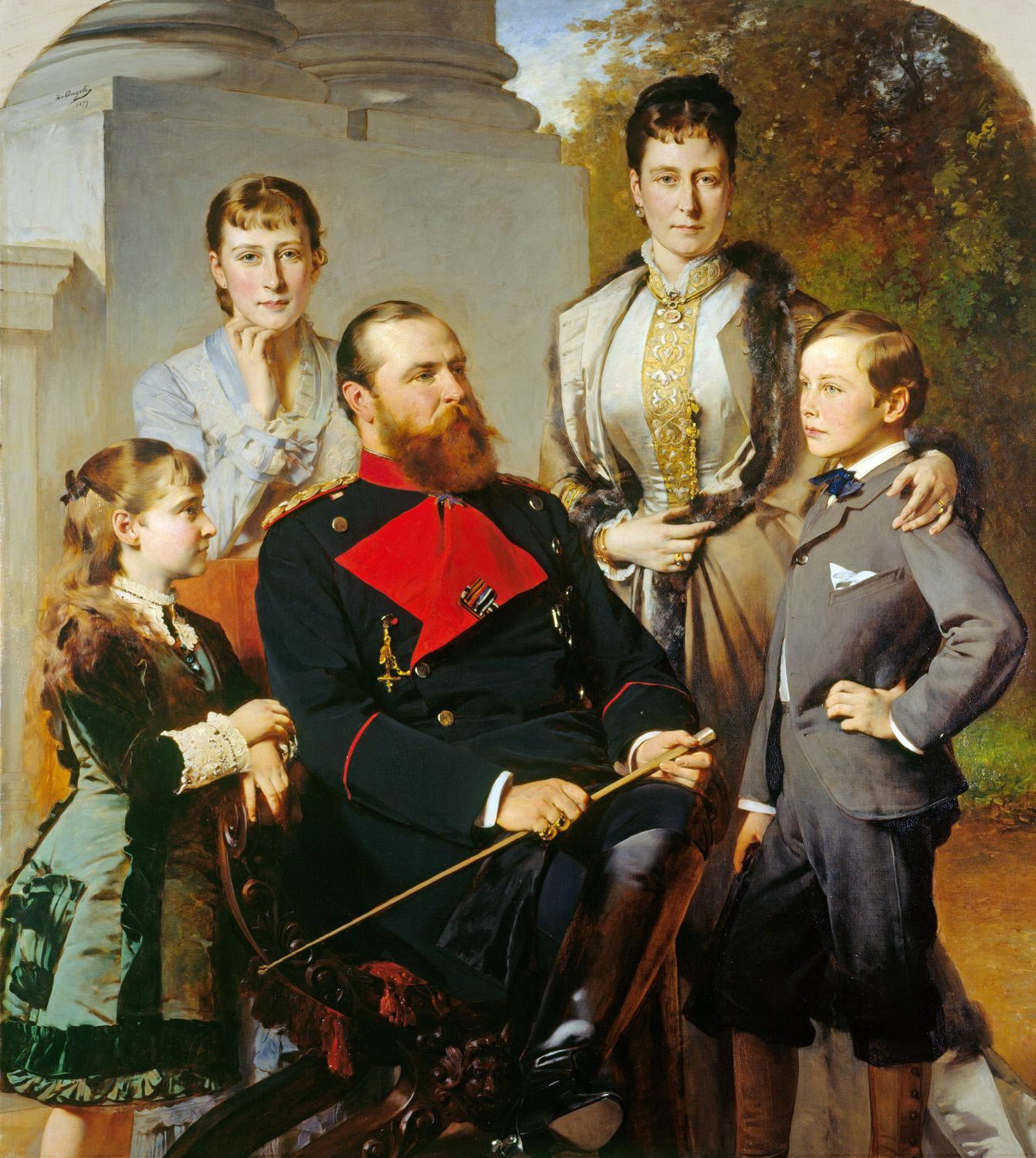
Portrait of Louis surrounded by his family, from left are Princess Alix (Later; Alexandra Feodorovna), Princess Victoria, Grand Duke Louis, Princess Alice, and Prince Ernest, by Heinrich von Angeli, (1879).

On 1 July 1862, Louis married Princess Alice, a daughter of Queen Victoria of the United Kingdom, at Osborne House on the Isle of Wight. On the day of the wedding, the Queen issued a royal warrant granting her new son-in-law the style of Royal Highness in the United Kingdom. The Queen also subsequently made Prince Louis a knight of the Order of the Garter.

Although this was an arranged marriage orchestrated by the bride's father Albert, Prince Consort, the couple did have a brief period of courtship before betrothal and wed willingly, even after the death of the Prince Consort left Queen Victoria in a protracted state of grief that cast a pall over the nuptials. Becoming parents in less than a year following their marriage, the young royal couple found themselves strapped financially to maintain the lifestyle expected of their rank. Princess Alice's interest in social services, scientific development, hands-on child-rearing, charity and intellectual stimulation were not shared by Louis who, although dutiful and benevolent, was bluff in manner and conventional in his pursuits. The death of the younger of their two sons, Frittie, who was afflicted with hemophilia and suffered a fatal fall from a palace window before his third birthday in 1873, combined with the wearying war relief duties Alice had undertaken in 1870, evoked a crisis of spiritual faith for the princess in which her husband does not appear to have shared.

== Military career ==
During the Austro-Prussian War of 1866, Louis commanded the Hessian cavalry in support of the Austrian side.

The Austrians were defeated in the war, and the Hessian grand duchy was in jeopardy of being awarded as the spoils of war to victorious Prussia, which annexed some of Austria's other allies (Hanover, Hesse-Cassel, Nassau). Hesse-Darmstadt appears to have been spared this fate only by a cession of territory and the close dynastic kinship between its ruler and the Emperor of Russia (Alexander II's consort, Empress Maria Alexandrovna, was the sister of Hesse's Grand Duke Louis III and of Prince Charles).

In the Franco-Prussian War Prince Louis fought on the side of Prussia and the North German Confederation; commanding the 25th Division. He was credited with courageous military service, especially at the Battle of Gravelotte, which also afforded him the opportunity of mending the previous war's grievances with the House of Hohenzollern by fighting on the same side as his brother-in-law and future emperor, Crown Prince Frederick William of Prussia. He had a good relationship with Frederick William and his wife Victoria, Princess Royal, for his entire life. He also visited him on his deathbed in 1888.

== Grand Duke of Hesse and by Rhine ==
In March 1877, Louis became heir presumptive to the Hessian throne when his father died and, less than three months later, found himself reigning grand duke upon the demise of his uncle, Louis III.

A year and a half later, however, Grand Duke Louis was stricken with diphtheria along with most of his immediate family. He recovered; but his four-year-old daughter Marie succumbed, along with his wife of 16 years. From then on, he reigned and raised his five surviving children alone. His youngest surviving daughter, Alix, married Tsar Nicholas II two years after his death in 1894.

== Second marriage ==
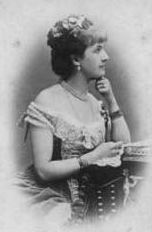
Countess Alexandrine von Hutten-Czapska

Grand Duchess Alice having died in 1878, Louis IV contracted a morganatic marriage on 30 April 1884 in Darmstadt (on the eve of the wedding of his eldest daughter, for which Queen Victoria and other relatives of his first wife were gathered in the Hessian capital) with Countess Alexandrine von Hutten-Czapska, younger daughter of Count Adam von Hutten-Czapski and his wife, Countess Marianna Rzewuska. She was the former wife of Aleksander von Kolemin, the Russian chargé d'affaires in Darmstadt. But the couple, facing objections from the Grand Duke's in-laws, separated within a week and the marriage was annulled within three months. As a compensation, she received the title Countess von Romrod on 31 May 1884 and a financial compensation. Alexandrine later married for the third time to Basil von Bacheracht.

== Death ==
Grand Duke Ludwig IV died of a heart attack in the New Palace in Darmstadt on 13 March 1892. He was succeeded by his son, Ernest Louis.

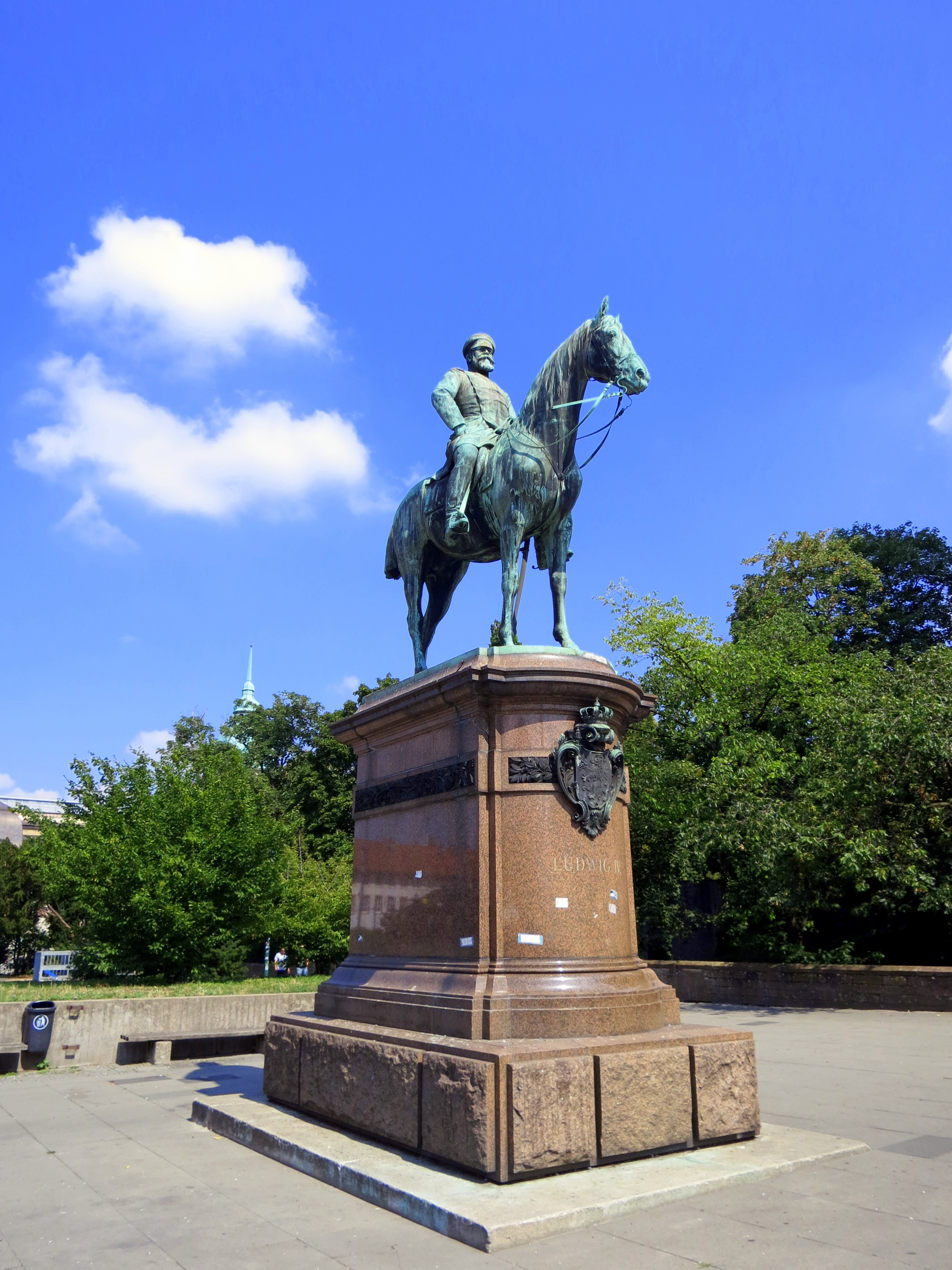
The Equestrian statue of Ludwig IV on the Friedensplatz in Darmstadt

== Honours ==
German orders and decorations

- Hesse-Darmstadt:
  - Grand Cross of the Ludwig Order, 11 April 1854
  - Grand Cross of the Merit Order of Philip the Magnanimous, 11 April 1854
  - Military Merit Cross, 30 January 1871
  - Military Honour Medal for 25 years of Service
  - Field Service Medal
  - War Medal for the Campaign in France (1870-1871)
- Hesse-Kassel: Knight of the Golden Lion, 9 January 1857
- (Duchy of Anhalt) Anhalt: Grand Cross of the Order of Albert the Bear
- Baden:
  - Knight of the House Order of Fidelity, 1862
  - Grand Cross of the Zähringer Lion
- Bavaria: Knight of St. Hubert, 1863
- Brunswick: Grand Cross of the Order of Henry the Lion
- (Saxe-Coburg and Gotha) (Duchy of Saxe-Altenburg) (Saxe-Meiningen) Ernestine duchies: Grand Cross of the Saxe-Ernestine House Order, 1863
- Mecklenburg:
  - Grand Cross of the Wendish Crown, with Crown in Ore and Collar
  - Military Service Cross, 2nd Class (Schwerin)
- Nassau: Knight of the Gold Lion of Nassau, June 1863
- Oldenburg: Grand Cross of the Order of Duke Peter Friedrich Ludwig, with Golden Crown and Collar, 5 July 1877
- Prussia:
  - Knight of the Black Eagle, 4 October 1864; with Collar, 1872
  - Grand Cross of the Red Eagle
  - Iron Cross (1870), 2nd and 1st Classes
  - Pour le Mérite (military), 28 February 1871
  - Grand Commander's Cross of the Royal House Order of Hohenzollern, 5 December 1878
- Saxony: Knight of the Rue Crown, 1877
- Württemberg: Grand Cross of the Württemberg Crown, 1865

Foreign orders and decorations

- (Austrian Empire) (Kingdom of Hungary) Austria-Hungary: Grand Cross of the Royal Hungarian Order of St. Stephen, 1880
- Belgium:
  - Grand Cordon of the Order of Leopold, 9 July 1862
  - Civic Cross, 1st Class
- Principality of Bulgaria:
  - Grand Cross of St. Alexander
  - Order of Bravery, 2nd Class
- Denmark: Knight of the Elephant, 23 September 1878
- Kingdom of Greece: Grand Cross of the Redeemer
- Kingdom of Italy: Grand Cross of Saints Maurice and Lazarus
- Netherlands:
  - Commander of the Military William Order, 1 May 1882
  - Grand Cross of the Netherlands Lion
- Ottoman Empire: Order of Osmanieh, 1st Class
- Kingdom of Portugal: Grand Cross of the Tower and Sword
- Kingdom of Romania: Grand Cross of the Star of Romania
- Spain: Grand Cross of the Order of Charles III, with Collar, 8 October 1883
- Kingdom of Serbia:
  - Grand Cross of the Cross of Takovo
  - Grand Cross of the White Eagle
- Sweden-Norway: Knight of the Seraphim, 21 September 1881
- United Kingdom: Stranger Knight of the Garter, 5 July 1862
- Russian Empire:
  - Knight of St. Andrew
  - Knight of St. Alexander Nevsky
  - Knight of the White Eagle
  - Knight of St. Anna, 1st Class
  - Knight of St. George, 3rd Class

== Issue ==
Issue (by Princess Alice)
Image	Name	Birth	Death	Notes
	Victoria Alberta Elisabeth Mathilde Marie	5 April 1863	24 September 1950	m. 30 April 1884 Prince Louis of Battenberg, later Marquess of Milford-Haven (24 May 1854-11 September 1921); 2 sons, 2 daughters (including Queen Louise of Sweden and Louis Mountbatten, 1st Earl Mountbatten of Burma).
	Elisabeth Alexandra Louise Alice	1 November 1864	18 July 1918	Took the name Yelisaveta Fyodorovna on her baptism into the Russian Orthodox Church; m. 15 June 1884 Grand Duke Sergei Alexandrovich of Russia (11 May 1857-17 February 1905), the seventh child and fifth son of Tsar Alexander II of Russia; had no issue
	Irene Louise Marie Anne	11 July 1866	11 November 1953	m. 24 May 1888 Prince Henry of Prussia (14 August 1862–20 April 1929), son of Frederick III, German Emperor; had 3 sons. Irene passed haemophilia on to two of her three sons: Prince Waldemar of Prussia and Prince Henry of Prussia.
	Ernest Louis Charles Albert William	25 November 1868	9 October 1937	Succeeded as Grand Duke of Hesse and by Rhine, 13 March 1892, abdicated 9 November 1918; m. (1), 9 April 1894 his first cousin Princess Victoria Melita of Saxe-Coburg and Gotha (25 November 1876–2 March 1936); 1 son (stillborn) and 1 daughter, div. 21 December 1901. m. (2), 2 February 1905, Princess Eleonore of Solms-Hohensolms-Lich (17 September 1871–16 November 1937); two sons.
	Frederick William Augustus Victor Leopold Louis	7 October 1870	29 May 1873	Suffered from haemophilia and died from internal bleeding after a fall from a window at age two and a half.
	Alix Victoria Helena Louise Beatrice	6 June 1872	17 July 1918	Took the name Alexandra Feodorovna on her baptism into the Russian Orthodox Church; m. 26 November 1894 Tsar Nicholas II of Russia (18 May 1868-17 July 1918); 1 son and 4 daughters. Their only son, Tsarevich Alexei Nikolaevich of Russia, suffered from haemophilia.
	Marie Victoria Feodore Leopoldine	24 May 1874	16 November 1878	Died of diphtheria at age four.

Louis IV of Hesse House of Hesse-Darmstadt Born: 12 September 1837 Died: 13 March 1892
German royalty
Preceded by Louis III	Grand Duke of Hesse and by Rhine; 1877–1892	Succeeded by Ernest Louis
