= Prince Alexander of Hesse and by Rhine =

Third son and fourth child of Louis II, Grand Duke of Hesse

Prince Alexander
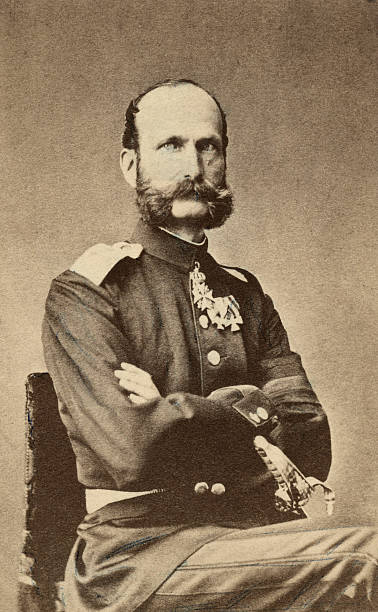
- Prince Alexander c. 1870
- Born: 15 July 1823; Darmstadt, Hesse
- Died: 15 December 1888 (aged 65); Jugenheim, Hesse
- Burial: Rosenhohe, Darmstadt
- Spouse: Julia, Princess of Battenberg (m. 1851)
- Issue: Marie, Princess of Erbach-Schönberg; Louis Mountbatten, 1st Marquess of Milford Haven; Alexander, Prince of Bulgaria; Prince Henry; Prince Francis Joseph
Names
- Alexander Ludwig Georg Friedrich Emil
- House: Hesse-Darmstadt
- Father: Louis II, Grand Duke of Hesse
- Mother: Wilhelmine of Baden

Prince Alexander of Hesse and by Rhine GCB (Alexander Ludwig Georg Friedrich Emil; 15 July 1823 – 15 December 1888), was the third son and fourth child of Louis II, Grand Duke of Hesse, and Wilhelmine of Baden. He was a brother of Tsarina Maria Alexandrovna, wife of Tsar Alexander II of Russia. The Battenberg-Mountbatten family descends from Alexander and his wife Countess Julia von Hauke, a former lady-in-waiting to his sister.

== Family and background ==
It was openly rumoured that Alexander and his sister Marie were not the children of the Grand Duke, but that their father was actually August von Senarclens de Grancy, their mother's chamberlain. His mother, although married to the grand duke, lived apart from her husband, who did not repudiate paternity of any of the four children born during the marriage.

When the future emperor Alexander II of Russia, as tsarevich, chose the sixteen-year-old Marie as consort, his parents consented to the match as worthy due to the Grand Duke's acknowledgement of her as his daughter. Because of her youth, Alexander escorted his sister to Russia for her wedding, remaining at the Russian court and joining the inner circle of his brother-in-law the tsarevich after the rest of Marie's entourage returned to Hesse.

== Alexander's marriage ==
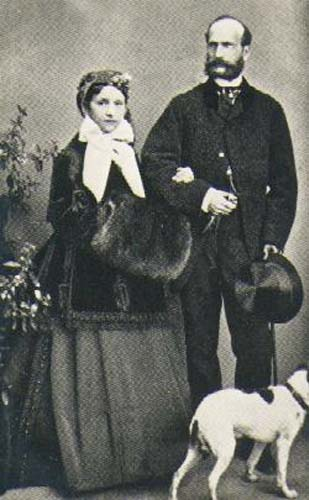
Photograph of Prince Alexander and his morganatic wife Julia

Alexander fell in love with Countess Julia von Hauke, lady-in-waiting to his sister (known, since her conversion to Orthodoxy, as Maria Alexandrovna, ranking only after her mother-in-law the Empress Alexandra Feodorovna). The countess was an orphaned German-Polish ward of the Russian Emperor, and daughter of the Emperor's former minister of war, Count Jan Maurycy Hauke, a Polish general of German descent who was also known as Johann Moritz von Hauke. At that time, the Emperor Nicholas I was considering Alexander as a possible husband for his niece and, when he heard of Alexander's romance, he forbade the couple to marry.

Alexander left for England to contemplate his future, but then returned to Russia and eloped with Julia from St. Petersburg, being stricken by the Emperor's orders from the roll of the Russian imperial army for insubordination. The two were married in Breslau in 1851.

Alexander's older brother Louis III, Grand Duke of Hesse, allowed him to re-patriate to Hesse with his bride, although he did not recognize their marriage as dynastic. He granted her the new, hereditary title of Gräfin von Battenberg (Battenberg was a small town and ruined castle in the north of the grand duchy which, according to the memoirs of their eldest child Marie, the family visited once during her youth, although it never became their residence).

Alexander's wife would deliver their first child barely six months after their elopement. Nonetheless, Julia von Hauke was a countess in her own right, as well as a former ward of the Russian Emperor whose husband retained, despite exile from Russia, the sympathetic support of the tsarevich and tsarevna. Grand Duke Louis III therefore chose to distinguish her from several non-royal wives of other Hessian princes by conferring upon her, along with the Battenberg countship, the style of Erlaucht (Illustrious Highness), usually reserved in Germany for counts of mediatized (i.e., dynastic) rank.

== Career ==
As a cadet of the Hessian grand ducal dynasty, Prince Alexander had followed the martial tradition of his family by offering his sword to the military service of a Great Power while still a teenager, having accompanied his sister to St. Petersburg. He became a respected commander in the Russian army, with the prospect of a distinguished career. He had a regiment of lancers named after him and was awarded the Order of St. George 4th class. His elopement, in sending him abroad AWOL, terminated his military career and made him, initially, a fugitive from Russia.

But once his elder brother recognized his wife, he was able to obtain an appointment in the Austrian army, where he resumed his military career, although remaining sufficiently in disgrace never to be billeted in Vienna. Each of his children would be born in a different city, depending upon where in the Austro-Hungarian empire Prince Alexander was stationed.

After serving Austria with distinction in several battles, he was given a major command in Hesse's small army in its war, as an ally of Austria, with Prussia in 1866. By this time his wife and children had taken up their home at Alexander's small castle, Schloss Heligenberg, at Seeheim-Jugenheim in Hesse, to which he retired after Prussia defeated Austria and Hesse. Although the electorate of Hesse-Kassel, ruled by another branch of Alexander's family, was annexed by Prussia for adhering to the losing side, the fact that Hesse-Darmstadt's grand duke was the brother-in-law of the Russian tsar saved its independence, although not without loss of territory. Henceforth, Alexander and his family alternated between their castle in the grandducal capital of Darmstadt, and their country home a few hours away by carriage.

Alexander was often in attendance at his elder brother's court. But a shift occurred when his sister, now Empress of Russia, began to pay annual visits to her brother in the 1870s along with her husband, children, and a large entourage. Louis III, while benefitting from his kinship to the tsar, preferred to defer entertaining him to Alexander and Marie at Heiligenberg. These annual visits had the twofold effect of enhancing the international prestige of the grandduchy while socially rehabilitating Alexander's morganatic household. The memoirs of his daughter, Marie of Battenberg, document the cordiality between Alexander and his eldest brother, while also recording the growing importance of her own family's household as diplomats who wished to pay court to the Russian emperor would await his annual visit to the Hessian countryside to do so discreetly in the more intimate setting of Alexander's home.

== Children ==
Although Prince Alexander retained his own dynastic rights and appanage, his morganatic wife lived a quiet life. Their family lived primarily at Heiligenberg Castle, in southern Hesse. In 1858, Grand Duke Louis III raised his sister-in-law from "Countess" to "Princess" (Prinzessin) von Battenberg; her children sharing in the princely title, and accorded them the style of Serene Highness (Durchlaucht).

Alexander of Hesse and Julia of Battenberg had five children:

- Princess Marie of Battenberg (15 February 1852 – 20 June 1923)
- Prince Louis of Battenberg (24 May 1854 – 11 September 1921)
- Prince Alexander of Battenberg (5 April 1857 – 17 November 1893)
- Prince Henry of Battenberg (5 October 1858 – 20 January 1896)
- Prince Francis Joseph of Battenberg (24 September 1861 – 31 July 1924)

Prince Alexander of Hesse died of cancer on 15 December 1888; Princess Julia of Battenberg, having converted to Lutheranism in 1875, died at Schloss Heiligenberg in 1895 at the age of 70. They lived to see four of their five children, who had no rights of succession to the Hessian throne, mount a throne or marry dynastically, and to become welcome in-laws to Queen Victoria, whose correspondence reflected a consistent respect and fondness for the Battenberg family.

== Descendants ==
Prince Alexander's children formed marital ties with several reigning families.

- Prince Louis married Princess Victoria (daughter of Queen Victoria's second daughter, Alice). Their children included:
  - Princess Louise became Queen of Sweden through her marriage to Gustaf VI Adolf of Sweden.
  - Princess Alice married Prince Andrew of Greece and Denmark, with whom her children included Prince Philip, Duke of Edinburgh, the husband of Queen Elizabeth II and father of King Charles III of the United Kingdom.
- Prince Henry married Queen Victoria's youngest daughter, Beatrice. Their only daughter:
  - Princess Victoria Eugenie became queen of Spain upon her marriage to King Alfonso XIII of Spain. Their grandson Juan Carlos I was King of Spain until 2014 when he abdicated in favor of his son, Felipe VI.
- Prince Alexander became the first reigning Prince of modern Bulgaria. He obtained the consent of Frederick III, German Emperor, to marry his daughter, Princess Viktoria of Prussia, whose mother and grandmother, Queen Victoria, also supported the marriage as a love match. But even before Alexander was deposed from his throne, the marriage was opposed by Prince Bismarck for political reasons and by his fiancée's brother, Wilhelm II, as a matter of dynastic pride, prompting Queen Victoria to withdraw her support as a concession to diplomacy, and Alexander to lose interest in favor of a morganatic marriage to Johanna Loisinger.

== Honours and awards ==
Prince Alexander received the following awards:

- Hesse-Darmstadt:
  - Grand Cross of the Ludwig Order, 8 November 1839
  - Grand Cross of the Merit Order of Philip the Magnanimous, with Swords, 1 May 1840
  - Military Medical Cross, 2 April 1871
- Hesse-Kassel:
  - Grand Cross of the Golden Lion, 29 December 1847
  - Knight of the Military Merit Order, 20 March 1860
- (Duchy of Anhalt) Anhalt: Grand Cross of the Order of Albert the Bear
- Bavaria: Knight of St. Hubert, 1852
- Baden:
  - Knight of the House Order of Fidelity, 1843
  - Grand Cross of the Zähringer Lion, 1843
- Brunswick: Grand Cross of the Order of Henry the Lion
- Mecklenburg:
  - Grand Cross of the Wendish Crown, with Crown in Ore
  - Military Merit Cross, 2nd Class (Schwerin)
- Nassau:
  - Knight of the Gold Lion of Nassau, June 1863
  - Grand Cross of the Order of Adolphe of Nassau, with Swords, September 1864
- Prussia:
  - Knight of the Black Eagle, 25 September 1847
  - Pour le Mérite (military), 3 November 1859
  - Knight of Honour of the Johanniter Order, 23 May 1884
- Saxony: Knight of the Rue Crown, 1872
- Saxe-Weimar-Eisenach: Grand Cross of the White Falcon, 1 October 1857
- Württemberg: Grand Cross of the Württemberg Crown, 1857
- Austria:
  - Grand Cross of the Imperial Order of Leopold, September 1857
  - Knight of the Military Order of Maria Theresa, 1859
  - Grand Cross of the Royal Hungarian Order of St. Stephen, 1874
- Bulgaria: Grand Cross of St. Alexander
- Denmark: Knight of the Elephant, 20 November 1875
- Greece: Grand Cross of the Redeemer
- Italy: Grand Cross of Saints Maurice and Lazarus
- Monaco: Grand Cross of St. Charles, 23 April 1865
- Ottoman Empire: Order of Osmanieh, 1st Class
- Russia:
  - Knight of St. Andrew, in Diamonds, 15 April 1841
  - Knight of St. Alexander Nevsky, 15 April 1841
  - Knight of the White Eagle, 15 April 1841
  - Knight of St. Anna, 1st Class, 15 April 1841
  - Knight of St. George, 4th Class, 1845; 3rd Class, July 1859
  - Knight of St. Vladimir, 1st Class
- United Kingdom: Honorary Grand Cross of the Bath (military), 22 July 1885
