= August von Senarclens de Grancy =

German noble (1794–1871)

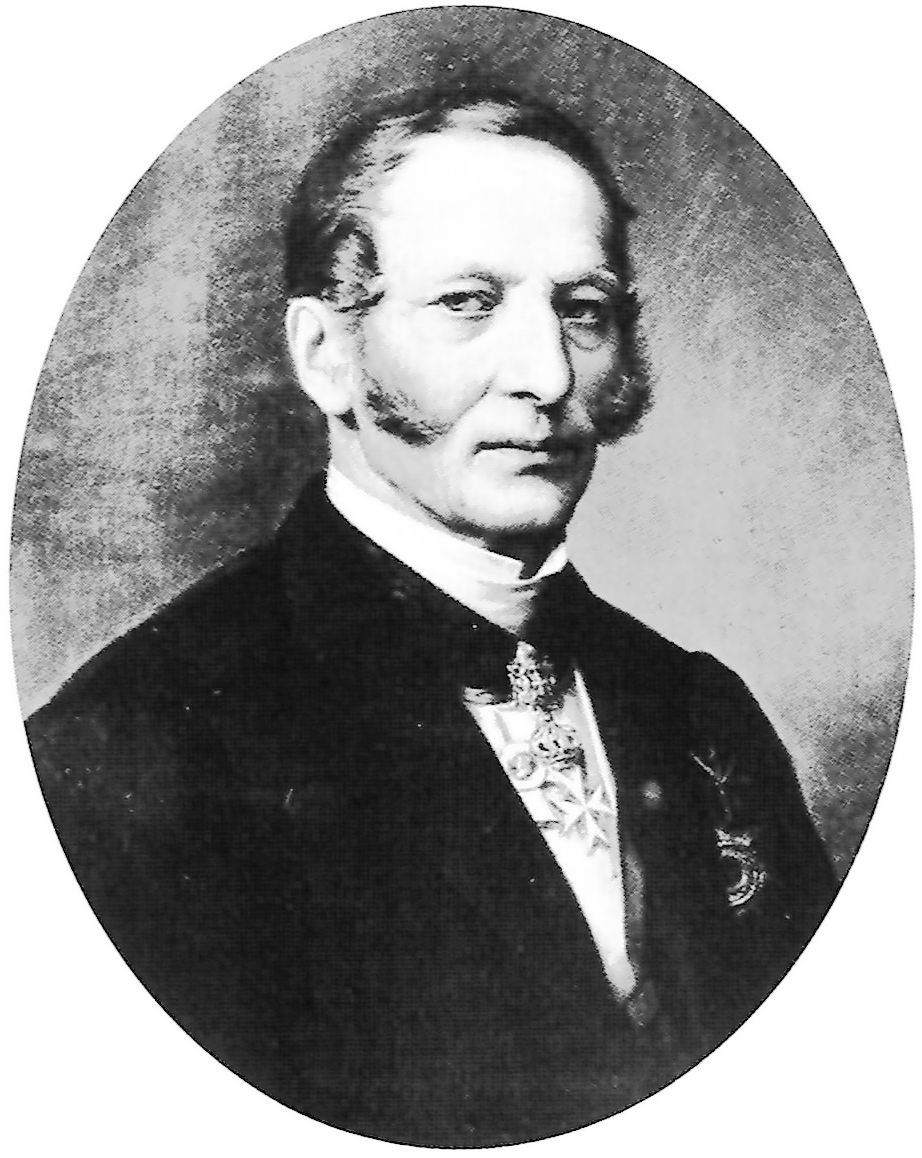
- Born: 19 August 1794; Vaud, Old Swiss Confederacy
- Died: 3 October 1871 (aged 77); Jugenheim, Kingdom of Prussia
- Spouse: Countess Luise von Otting und Fünfstetten (m. 1836)

August Ludwig Freiherr von Senarclens de Grancy (French: Auguste Louis de Senarclens de Grancy; 19 August 1794 – 3 October 1871) was the life partner of Wilhelmine of Baden, the Grand Duchess consort of Hesse, and the alleged father of Empress Maria Alexandrovna of Russia and Prince Alexander of Hesse and by Rhine.

== Life ==
Senarclens-Grancy was the firstborn son of César Auguste de Senarclens de Grancy (1763–1836) and Élisabeth de Loriol (1773–1846). In 1815, he was employed as an aide by Louis II, Grand Duke of Hesse. His first position at court was as Master of the Horse (German: Reise-Oberstallmeister) to Grand Duchess Wilhelmine.

In 1820, Louis II acquired the Heiligenberg estate near Jugenheim, where he installed Senarclens-Grancy as an attendant (German: Major à la suite der Kavallerie). Grand Duchess Wilhelmine summered at Heiligenberg, and travelled to other estates, rarely accompanying her husband to court. She was regularly accompanied by Senarclens-Grancy who is described by one source as her "life parter" (German: Lebensgefährte).

After nine years without pregnancy, Grand Duchess Wilhelmine gave birth to four children from 1821 to 1824. Senarclens-Grancy's paternity of the children was alleged at the time. However, Louis II did not deny paternity nor did he disinherit the children who lived to adulthood.

Senarclens-Grancy married Luise von Otting und Fünfstetten in 1836. His eldest daughter with Luise, Wilhelmine Marie (1837–1912), was appointed a Lady-in-waiting to the Hessian court and later served as chief steward (German: Obersthofmeisterin) to Ernest Louis, Grand Duke of Hesse.

In 1865, Senarclens-Grancy was awarded the Grand Cross of the Ludwig Order (German: Großkreuz des Ludwigsorden) for fifty years of service.

== Marriage and children ==
=== Allegedly with Wilhelmine of Baden ===
Grand Duchess Wilhelmine's children born after 1820 were:

- Princess Amalia Elisabeth Luise Karoline Friederike Wilhelmine (20 May 1821 – 27 May 1826).
- Stillborn daughter (7 June 1822).
- Prince Alexander Ludwig Georg Friedrich Emil (15 July 1823 – 15 December 1888), morganatically married to Countess Julie von Hauke, she and their children being elevated to the title of Princes of Battenberg.
- Princess Maximiliane Wilhelmine Auguste Sophie Marie (8 August 1824 – 3 June 1880); the future Empress consort of Alexander II of Russia.

=== Marriage to Luise von Otting und Fünfstetten ===
On 15 November 1836, Senarclens de Grancy married Countess Luise Wilhelmine Camille von Otting und Fünfstetten (née von Schönfeld; 24 May 1810 – 18 May 1876). She was the daughter of Count Friedrich von Otting und Fünfstetten (1767–1834) and Wilhelmine de Montperny (1788–1874).

- Baroness Wilhelmine Marie (11 August 1837 – 22 November 1912), unmarried.
- Baron Ludwig (9 June 1839 – 2 February 1910), on 27 October 1870, married Amalie Barbara Löw von und zu Steinfurth (1852–1936), daughter of Wilhelm Löw von und zu Steinfurth and Elisabeth Seipel.
- Baroness Marie Wilhelmine (9 June 1840 – 5 July 1908), on 26 September 1871, married Ludwig Heinrich von Hesse (1827–1895), sometimes written Hess, son of Andreas Wilhelm von Hesse.
- Baroness Katharine Karoline Maria Wilhelmine Louise (10 March 1842 – 4 December 1842), died in infancy
- Baron Heinrich Adolph Maximilian Ludwig (31 July 1845 – 17 January 1908), unmarried.
- Baron Albert Ludwig Friedrich (9 February 1847 – 20 January 1901), married Antoinette Wilhelmine de Senarclens de Grancy (1852-1914), a distant cousin.
- Baroness Constance Marie Wilhelmine (11 September 1852 – 9 March 1933), married Karl von Oertzen.

== Ancestry ==
Ancestors of August von Senarclens de Grancy

8. Pierre Daniel de Senarclens
4. Auguste Victor de Senarclens
9. Bénigne de Gingins
2. César Auguste de Senarclens de Grancy
10. Charles Esaïe de Chandieu
5. Madeleine de Chandieu
11. Renée de Chandieu
1. August von Senarclens de Grancy
12. Paul de Loriol
6. Rodolphe de Loriol
13. Madeleine Monnier
3. Élisabeth de Loriol
14. Pierre Tronchin
7. Catherine Tronchin
15. Catherine Armand
