= Maria Alexandrovna (Marie of Hesse) =

Empress of Russia from 1855 to 1880

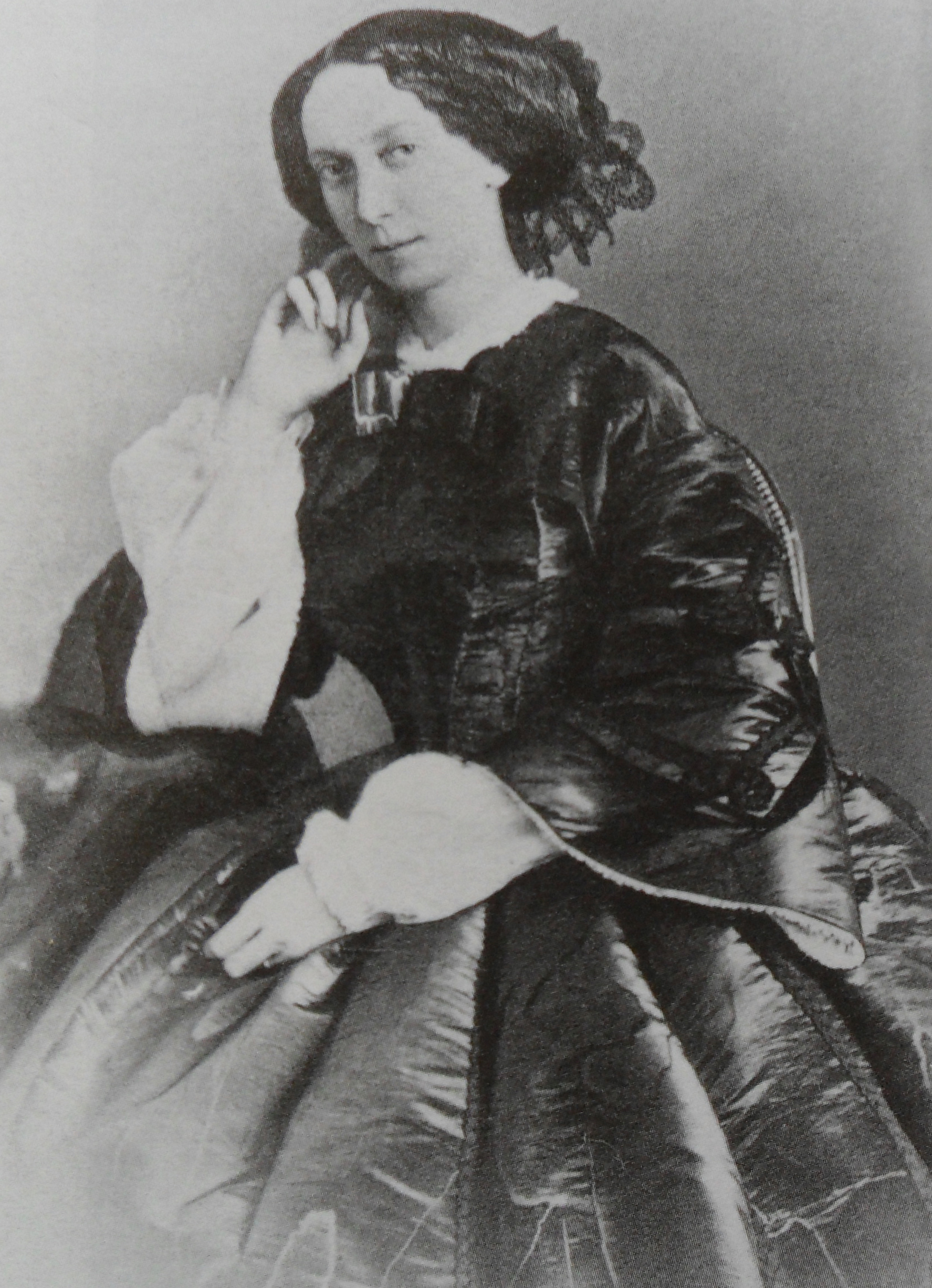
- Photographed in the 1860s

Empress consort of Russia
- Tenure: 2 March 1855 – 3 June 1880
- Coronation: 7 September 1855
- Born: Princess Marie of Hesse and by Rhine; 8 August 1824; Darmstadt, Grand Duchy of Hesse, German Confederation
- Died: 3 June 1880 (aged 55); Winter Palace, St. Petersburg, Russian Empire
- Burial: Peter and Paul Cathedral, St. Petersburg, Russian Empire
- Spouse: Alexander II of Russia (m. 1841)
- Issue: Grand Duchess Alexandra; Nicholas Alexandrovich, Tsesarevich of Russia; Alexander III, Emperor of Russia; Grand Duke Vladimir; Grand Duke Alexei; Maria Alexandrovna, Duchess of Saxe-Coburg and Gotha; Grand Duke Sergei; Grand Duke Paul
Names
- German: Maximilianne Wilhelmine Auguste Sophie Marie; Russian: Maria Alexandrovna Romanova
- House: Hesse-Darmstadt
- Father: Louis II, Grand Duke of Hesse (officially); August von Senarclens de Grancy (rumored)
- Mother: Princess Wilhelmine of Baden

Maria Alexandrovna (Russian: Мария Александровна), born Princess Marie of Hesse and by Rhine (8 August 1824 – 3 June 1880), was Empress of Russia as the first wife of Emperor Alexander II.

She was born to Ludwig II, Grand Duke of Hesse, and his wife Princess Wilhelmine of Baden, she was given a good education and raised in relative austerity, with an emphasis on simplicity, piety and domesticity. Her mother died when Marie was only twelve, and when she was fourteen, she caught the eye of Tsesarevich Alexander Nikolaevich, who was visiting her father's court while making his Grand Tour of Western Europe. The couple were married after Marie turned sixteen. The new tsesarevna did not initially enjoy court life because of her withdrawn nature, and the fact that she found the splendor and extravagance of the Russian court daunting after the frugality that she was accustomed to. Marie soon grew to identify strongly with her adopted country, and her young age at marriage facilitated this adoption.

After the death of her father-in-law, Nicholas I, in 1855, Alexander became emperor and, now known as Maria, she became empress consort of Russia. After the death of her mother-in-law in 1860, Maria took on a greater role in public life. She became one of the founders of the Russian Red Cross Society, part of the International Red Cross Movement which was founded in 1863 to promote nursing and medical care across the world. She also established Russia's first all-female schools. She gave her husband strong moral support as he navigated the legislations to end serfdom. She also interested herself in the arts: The Mariinsky Theatre in Saint Petersburg and the Mariinskyi Palace were built under her patronage and named after her.

Despite identifying strongly with Russia and Russian interests, she visited her native Hesse regularly every year from the early 1860s onward, and kept in touch with her own family, as also with her husband's relatives across Europe. She suffered from tuberculosis from 1863 onwards and spent long periods of time in southern Europe to avoid the harsh winters of Russia. Her health worsened after the death of her eldest son, Nicholas Alexandrovich, who died just before the date of his intended wedding. She was noted for her wisdom and intellect, and her generous devotion to family, including her husband's mistress and her children.

== Childhood ==
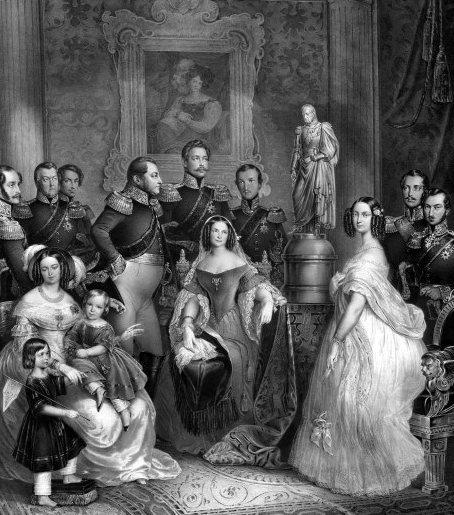
Marie of Hesse with her family in 1841: The statue portrays her grandfather Ludwig I. Her father Ludwig II stands in the left center; her uncle Georg is to the left of Ludwig; her uncle Friderich is between them; and her uncle Emil stands on the extreme right. The portrait shows her mother Wilhelmine. Her eldest brother Ludwig III is the tall man in the center behind her sister-in-law, his wife Mathilde. Her brother Karl is on the extreme left, behind his wife Elisabeth and their children, Ludwig IV and Heinrich. Her brother Alexander is standing between his brother and the statue, while Marie herself stands to the right of the statue. Her husband Alexander is between her and Emil.

Maximiliane Wilhelmine Auguste Sophie Marie was born on 8 August 1824 in Darmstadt, Hesse, Germany, the youngest of seven siblings born to Prince Hereditary Ludwig of Hesse and Princess Wilhelmine of Baden, sister of Russian Empress Elizabeth Alexeievna. Although her parents were double first cousins, they were a mismatched couple: Ludwig was dull, shy and withdrawn, while Wilhelmine, eleven years his junior, was pretty and charming. After the birth of three sons, the couple grew apart during the turbulent years of the Napoleonic Wars while Ludwig was at the battlefields.

After a gap of eleven years, Princess Wilhelmine went on to have four more children, but court rumors attributed the biological paternity of the second set of children to Baron August von Senarclens de Grancy, Grand Master of the stables of the Grand Duke of Hesse. Of those four children, Marie and her brother Alexander, who was a year older, lived to adulthood. While Prince Ludwig officially recognized the children as his, he and his wife became estranged by 1827. Her ancestry chart below assumes her legitimacy. See Grancy's page for her rumored paternal ancestry.

In 1828, Princess Wilhelmine moved with her two younger children and their household to Heiligenberg, a mountainside estate nestled on a hill overlooking the village of Jugenheim that she purchased that same year. Wilhelmine Marie was 4 years old when she moved with 5-year-old Alexander and their mother to Heiligenberg, where the siblings spent most of their childhood. The castle had been previously a nunnery and was located some 20 kilometers from Darmstadt. In 1829, however, their parents celebrated their silver wedding anniversary in apparent harmony. In 1830, their paternal grandfather, Ludwig I of Hesse, died and their father became the new reigning Grand Duke. The ducal couple gradually reconciled and used Heiligenberg in the summer months.

Wilhelmine Marie grew up under the care of her mother, who was responsible for her high education and had preference for French culture. This was evident in her lessons, which had special emphasis on finances, history, and literature. After her mother died of tuberculosis, her lady-in-waiting and possible paternal aunt, Marianne von Senarclens de Grancy, successfully took over the responsibility of 11-years-old Marie's education.

After their mother's death, Marie and Alexander moved permanently to their father's court in Darmstadt. The siblings would remain very close throughout their lives. She became close to her two elder brothers Louis III, Grand Duke of Hesse, and Prince Karl of Hesse. However, the cloud over the birth's legitimacy continued to be cast upon Marie and Alexander since Ludwig II was cold and distant towards the children.

== Engagement ==
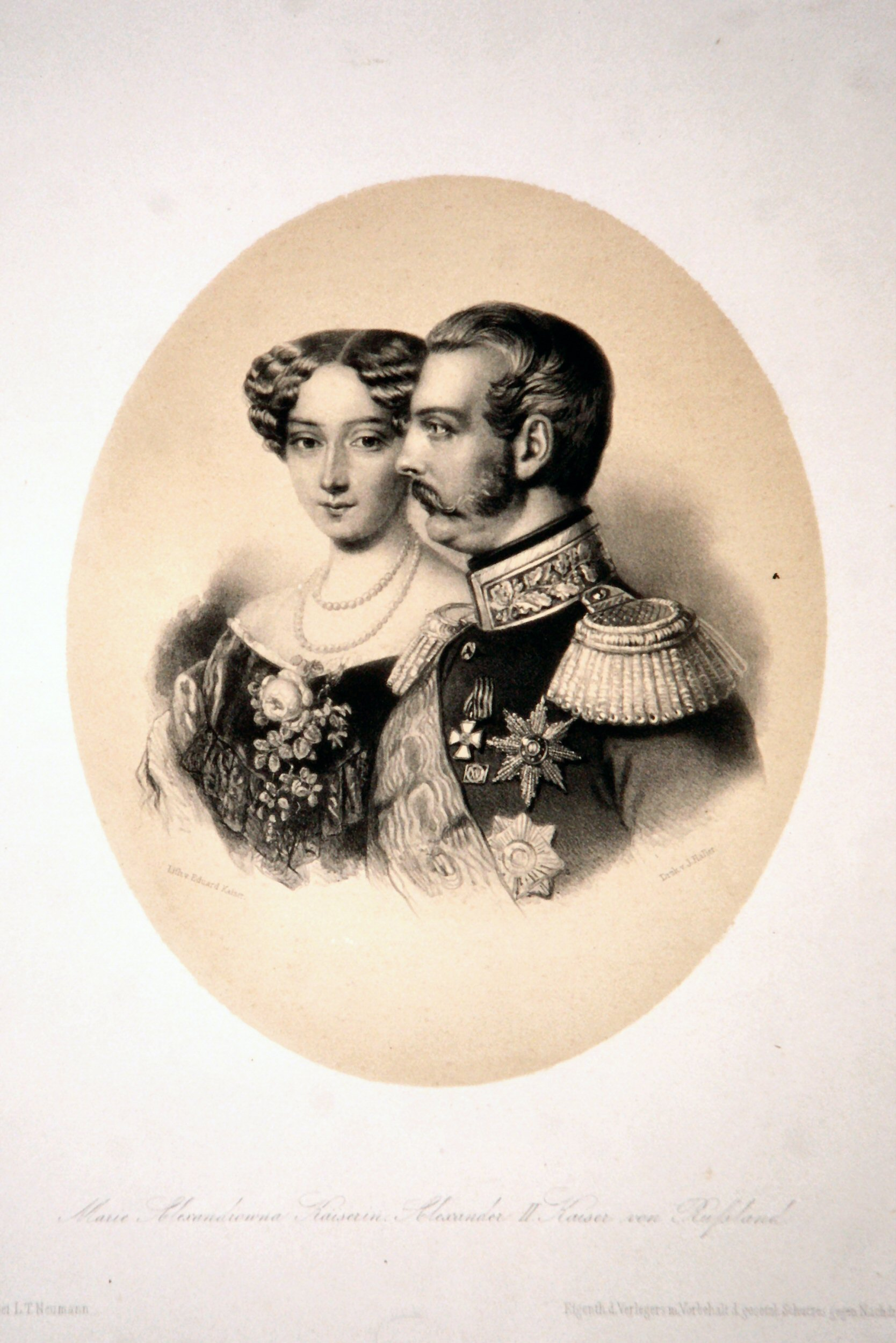
Alexander II and Maria Alexandrovna

In 1839, Tsesarevich Alexander Nikolaevich, son of Tsar Nicholas I of Russia, traveled to western Europe to complete his education and search for a wife. His parents had preselected Princess Alexandrine of Baden, but he was unmoved. On 13 March, after visiting the courts of Prussia, Württemberg and Baden, Alexander's entourage made an unplanned stop at the court of Hesse. Although the Grand Duke's only surviving daughter wasn't on the list of possible brides, they stopped for one day in Darmstadt because it was on their way and they needed some rest.

Invited to a performance of Gaspare Spontini's La vestale by the Grand Duke, Alexander was introduced to 14-year-old Marie, who was slender and tall for her age, but still wore her hair loose. She was eating cherries and had to spit the pits into her hands when she was pushed forward to be introduced to the Tsesarevich. Alexander's tutor, Vasily Zhukovsky, who was traveling with him, described the Princess as: "modest, charming and even intelligent."

Alexander was smitten and stayed to dine with the boring Ludwig II to see Marie again. Before he left Darmstadt, she gave him a locket containing a piece of her hair. That night Alexander wrote to his father: "I liked her terribly at first sight. If you permit it father, I will come back to Darmstadt after England." As his son had carefully planned, Nicholas I received the letter nine days later on the day of the annunciation and saw the timing as a good omen. He gave his approval despite the gossip surrounding her birth: if Ludwig II recognized her as his daughter, that was good enough. In early June, Alexander returned to Darmstadt to propose to Marie, who accepted. As she wasn't yet fifteen, a long engagement period was necessary before the actual marriage would take place. Towards the closing weeks of 1839, he returned to Darmstadt to visit her again. A Russian Orthodox priest came to Darmstadt to give her instruction in the Russian Orthodox religion.

The engagement between the Princess of Hesse and the Russian Tsesarevich was officially announced in April 1840. Two generations earlier, another princess of Hesse-Darmstadt had married a Tsesarevich: Marie's paternal great-aunt, Natalia Alexeievna, was the first wife of Tsar Paul I. In addition, Marie's maternal aunt Louise of Baden (Empress Elizabeth Alexeievna) had married Tsar Alexander I, though she died when Marie was only two years old. However, Alexandra Feodorovna (Charlotte of Prussia) objected to her son's choice of a wife. The Empress wasn't only disturbed by the rumors surrounding Marie's paternity, but ill-disposed towards the Hesse family and concerned that Marie might have inherited her mother's consumption. In a letter to his mother, Alexander wrote: "I love her, and I would rather give up the throne, than not marry her. I will marry only her, that has my decision!" After being persuaded by her husband, Empress Alexandra went to Frankfurt, where she met Marie in June. By then, Marie had quickly learned the Russian language. The Empress liked what she saw and gave her permission for the marriage.

== Tsesarevna ==
=== Wedding ===
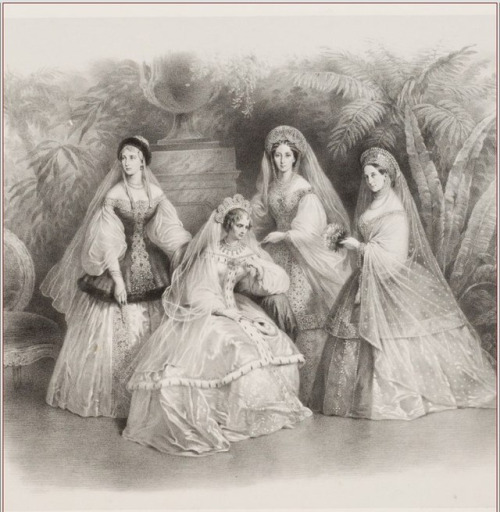
Tsarina Alexandra Feodorovna (Charlotte of Prussia) with her daughter Maria Nikolaevna and her daughters-in-law: Grand Duchesses Maria Alexandrovna and Alexandra Iosifovna, 1853.

A few weeks after her sixteenth birthday in August 1840, Marie's party set out for Russia. She was escorted by her brother Alexander and her governess, Mlle. von Grancy, who remained in Russia. Marie arrived in September and shared her impressions of Saint Petersburg in a letter to her family: "St. Petersburg is much more beautiful than I thought. The Neva River contributes to this. I think it is difficult to find a greater city. The view from the Winter Palace on the Neva is wonderful!" Her arrival in Russia was greeted with great ceremony with a continuous round of amusements. French plays, operas and new ballets were performed in the Chinese theater, and each Sunday her future mother-in-law gave a banquet in the Alexander Palace. However, Marie had a hard time adapting to her new surroundings. Years later, her-lady-in waiting Anna Tiutcheva was to write about this period in the life of her mistress: "Having been raised in seclusion even, one might say, in austerity, in the little castle of Jugenheim, where she saw her father only rarely, she was more frightened than bedazzled when she was suddenly brought to the most opulent and brilliant court of all European nations. She told me that many times. After constant battles of overcoming her awkwardness, later on, under cover of darkness and the stillness of her room, she would give freedom to her muffled cries".

Having been raised in the Lutheran religion, Marie was received into the Russian Orthodox Church on 17 December [O.S. 5 December] 1840 and became Grand Duchess Maria Alexandrovna. On the next day, the official betrothal was held in the presence of the Imperial Family, the whole court, the Russian nobility, many notable foreign guests, and representatives of foreign states. The wedding took place on 28 April [O.S. 16 April] 1841 in the Cathedral Church of the Winter Palace in St. Petersburg, on the eve of Alexander's twenty-third birthday. Maria wore a white dress richly embroidered with silver, a crimson robe with white satin and fine ermine fastened on her shoulders, and diamond jewelry (tiara, earrings, a necklace, and bracelets). Her future mother-in-law decorated her hair with orange blossoms sticking them between the diamonds in her tiara and pinned a small branch on her chest. The wedding was attended by members of the Russian Imperial family, the court and numerous guests and it was followed by a festive dinner ball.

=== First years ===
Marie won the hearts of all those Russians who could get to know her. Sasha [Alexander II] became more attached to her every day, feeling that his choice fell on God-given. Their mutual trust grew as they recognized each other. Papa [Nicholas I] always began his letters to her with the words: "Blessed be Thy Name, Mary." ... Dad joyfully watched the manifestation of the strength of this young character and admired Marie's self-control. This, in his opinion, balanced the lack of Sasha's lack of energy from which he constantly worried about.

— Olga Nikolaevna. A dream of youth. Memories of the Grand Duchess Olga Nikolaevna

After the wedding, the young couple settled in a suite of rooms in the south-west block of the Winter Palace. During the summer, they resided in Tsarskoye Selo. Their apartments were located in the Zubov wing of the Catherine Palace.

Maria Alexandrovna struggled to assimilate herself with the court and make friends. Endless balls and court receptions bored her, but etiquette obliged her to fulfill the duties of representation as the wife of the Tsarevich. She reflected that life at court demanded "daily heroism... I lived like a volunteer fireman, ready to jump up at the alarm. Of course, I wasn't too sure about where to run or what to do." She preferred country life in Tsarskoye Selo, where she enjoyed a more private life.

Maria won the approval of her father-in-law, Nicholas I. Nicholas I forbade anyone from discussing, or even thinking about, any rumors about her.

Like her mother, Maria took great interest in horticulture and imported flowers from her native Germany, such as lilies of the valley and cowslips. In the mornings, she took long walks with her ladies-in-waiting through the parks at the Catherine and Alexander Palace at Tsarskoe Selo.

In this early period of her life in Russia, Maria was guided by her husband's aunt, Grand Duchess Elena Pavlovna. Although seventeen years apart in age, the two women became close friends and frequently ran their salons as a joint venture.

Maria and Alexander made a happy couple, full of tender care for one another. He ordered that banquets of fresh strawberries should be placed on his wife's dining table and enjoyed her company spending his mornings sitting on her bed. There were regular informal gatherings at the young couple's household of loud readings, music, and card playing. Alongside her husband, Maria read Mikhail Lermontov's A Hero of Our Time, Nikolai Gogol's Dead Souls, Fyodor Dostoevsky's Poor Folk, and later, Ivan Turgenev's A Sportsman's Sketches, sharing Alexander's sympathies for the plight of the serfs and becoming an ardent abolitionist. The Tsarevich and the Tsarevna charmed their guests with their manners. She gave useful advice to her husband, who in turn gave her confidence to guide herself into society.

Sixteen months after her wedding, Maria Alexandrovna gave birth to her first child, Alexandra, born in August 1842, two years after her arrival in Russia. In September 1843, she gave birth to a son, Nicholas. Two more sons, Alexander and Vladimir, were born in 1845 and 1847. Shortly after having her third son, her health began to fail and she had to go to Bad Kissingen in Bavaria to recuperate. To mark each birth, Alexander and Maria planted oak trees in their private garden at Tsarskoye Selo, where skittles, swings and slides were provided for the children. Indoors, she played the piano and created tapestries with her family. In July 1849, both parents were devastated when their daughter Alexandra died from infant meningitis at the age of six and a half. Grief-stricken by her loss, Maria had to go to the sea town of Revel in Estonia to recuperate. Even many years later, she would still cry over the death of her eldest child. In January 1850, she gave birth to a fourth son, Grand Duke Alexei.

During her first decade in Russia, Maria Alexandrovna enjoyed the company and support of her brother Alexander, who had accompanied her to Russia to follow a military career there. In 1851, he contracted a morganatic marriage with Julia von Hauke, one of his sister's ladies-in-waiting. As a consequence, he fell from grace and had to resign his Russian commission. He left the country, returning to Heiligenberg, the siblings' childhood home. In October 1853, Maria had a much-awaited second daughter, Grand Duchess Maria Alexandrovna.

== Empress ==
The first time I set eyes on the Grand Duchess, she was already twenty-eight years old, but still looked very young. She retained that youthful appearance all her life; when she was forty, she could have been taken for a woman of thirty. Although she was tall and slender, the Empress was so thin and fragile that at first glance she gave no impression of a 'belle dame'. However, she was unusually elegant, with that special kind of grace only found in old German paintings or Madonnas by Albert Dürer. Although her facial features were regular, her beauty lay in the delicate color of her skin and her large blue eyes, which looked at you with both perception and timidity... She seemed almost out of place and uneasy in her role as mother, wife, and empress. She was tenderly attached to her family and conscientiously fulfilled the duties which her exalted rank demanded. Her mind was like her soul: refined, subtle, penetrating and extremely ironic, but lacking in breadth and initiative.

— Anna Tiutcheva. At the court of two Emperors, pages 78–80.

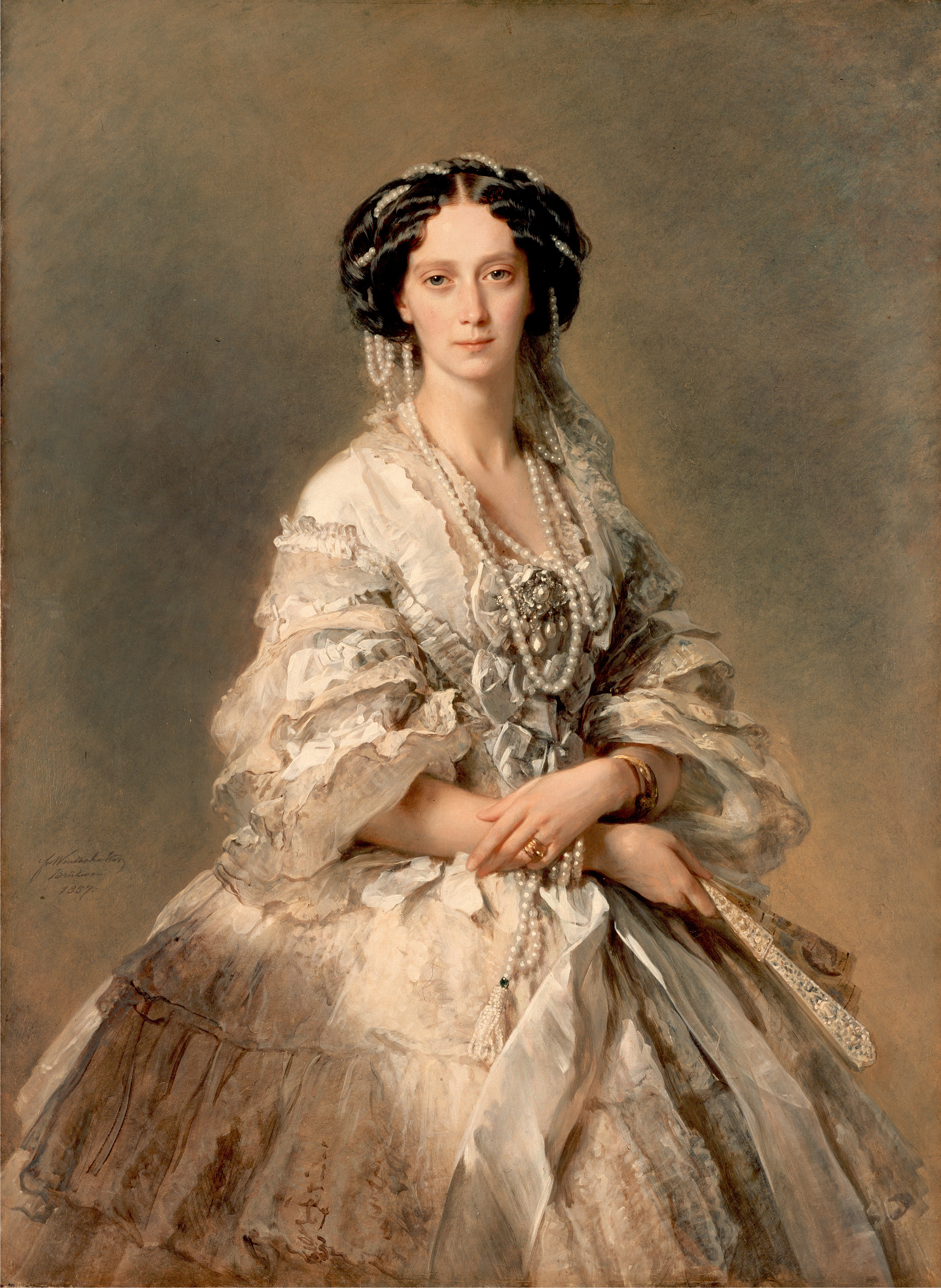
Portrait by Franz Xaver Winterhalter, 1857

On 18 February 1855, Nicholas I died of pneumonia and was succeeded by Alexander to the Russian throne as Tsar. It was a turbulent period as Russian troops were being defeated by an international coalition in the Crimean War. After a siege lasting eleven months, Sevastopol fell in September 1855. With a prospect of invasion from the west if the war continued, Russia sued for peace in March 1856 in Paris. The humiliation of defeat was left behind by the coronation festivities that were held with Byzantine splendor from 14 to 26 August 1856. The coronation ceremony lasted five hours took place at the Assumption Cathedral of Moscow Kremlin on 7 September [O.S. 26 August] 1856. When four court ladies tried to fix the crown to the 30-year-old Empress's head it nearly clattered to the ground, saved only by the fold of her cloak, a bad omen by the time.

Nine months after the coronation, Maria Alexandrovna gave birth to a fifth son, Sergei, in April 1857. Suffering from depression, she was sent to Kissingen to recuperate. On 3 October [O.S. 21 September] 1860, she gave birth to Paul, her eighth and final child, but was so weakened that she was forced to spend several months resting on a couch in her boudoir in the Winter Palace. A month later, her mother-in-law died.

=== Charity Institutions ===
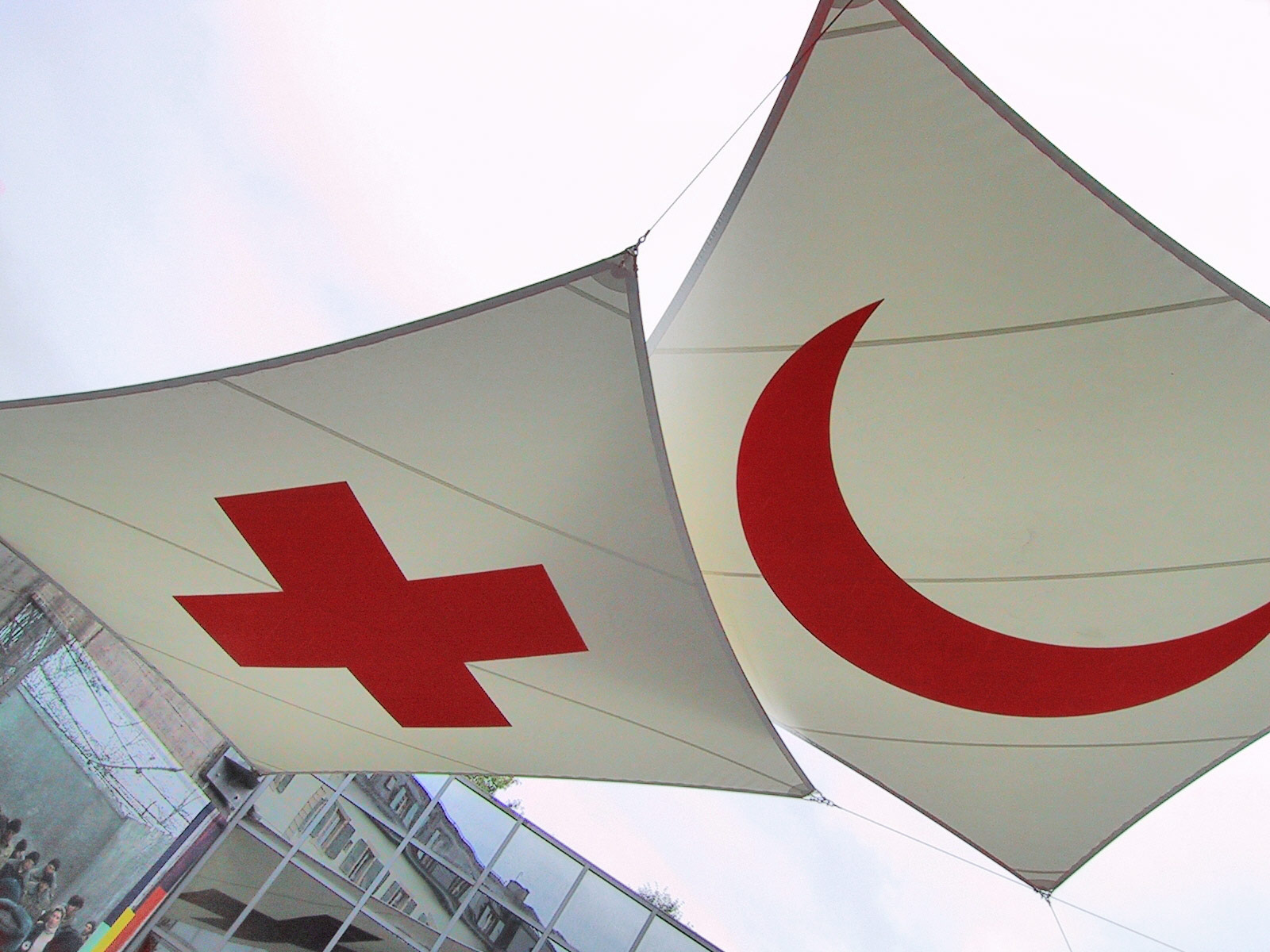
The Red Cross and Red Crescent emblems, the symbols from which the movement derives its name.

Since Russian tradition gave precedence to the Empress Mother over the reigning tsar's consort, it was only then that Maria Alexandrovna took a more decisive role in charitable activities. It was with her that the Red Cross was established in Russia, which quickly turned into the largest and wealthiest public structure. Under her organization, the institution accumulated in its accounts huge sums of money transferred by benefactors from all over the Empire. The women's committees recollected twice the average funds recollected by provincial committees.

Maria Alexandrovna was the supreme patroness of the Red Cross: In total, she patronized 5 hospitals, 12 alms-houses, 30 shelters, 2 institutes, 38 gymnasiums, 156 lower schools, and 5 private charitable societies. Empress Maria expanded charitable activities during the Russo-Turkish War of 1877–78. The beginning of a new era in women's education in Russia was marked by her establishment of open all-union women's educational institutions in 1872. The students received lessons of physics, chemistry, and medicine.

=== Emancipation Manifesto ===
A 1907 painting by Boris Kustodiev depicting Russian serfs listening to the proclamation of the 1861 edict abolishing serfdom.

Tsar Alexander II relied on Maria Alexandrovna's judgment and serious nature to support his government, opening official documents and discussing states of affairs with her. She supported Alexander's ideals of introducing reforms. Two opposite philosophical currents divided Russian politics of their time: Westernizers and Slavophiles. The Westernizers, led by Alexander Herzen, Vissarion Belinsky, Ivan Turgenev and Mikhail Bakunin, wanted Russia aligned to Western science and values such as free thought, rationalism and individual liberty. By contrast, the Slavophiles, led by Aleksey Khomyakov, the two Aksakov brothers, Konstantine and Ivan, and Ivan Kireyevsky and his brother Pyotr Kireevsky advocated three principles: Autocracy, Orthodoxy and Nationalism.

Maria Alexandrovna embraced Slavism with fervor and encouraged capitalism. She also played an important role in the liberation of the serfs that came into fruition with the Emancipation Proclamation on 3 March [O.S. 19 February] 1861, ending serfdom in Russia.

=== Court life ===
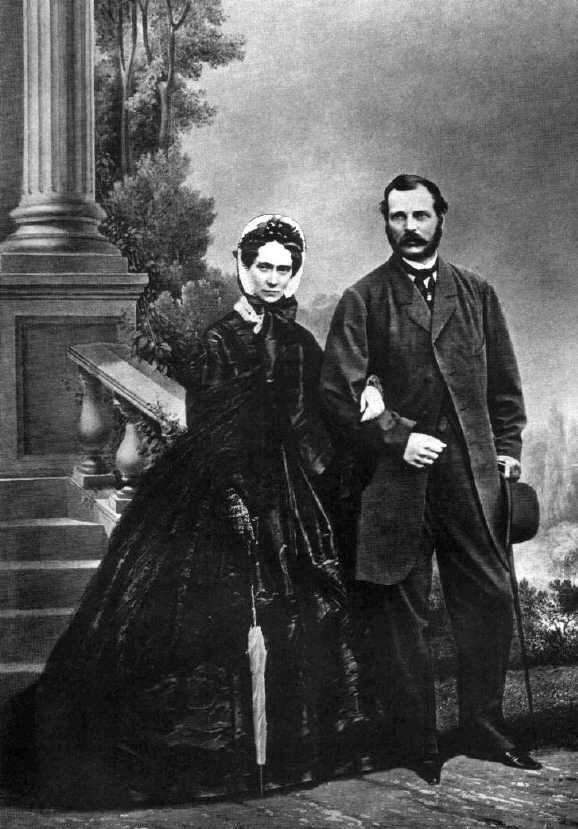
Empress Maria Alexandrovna alongside her husband, Tsar Alexander II of Russia.

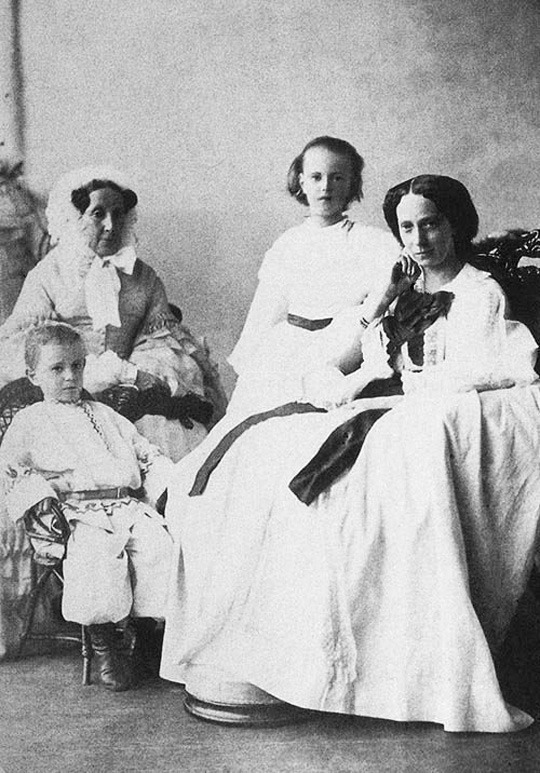
Empress Maria Alexandrovna of Russia with her children Maria and Sergei, 1861.

The Russian court began its season early December and lasted until Lent. While subzero temperatures and icy winds kept the streets empty, balls and banquets were held indoors in overheated palaces, where their gracious host, Alexander II, gave intimate parties known as Les Bals des Palmières for which hundreds of palm trees were brought to the Winter Palace in horse-drawn boxes. However, Maria Alexandrovna did not share her husband's enthusiasm since she still disliked court events and considered Russian nobility frivolous. Society complained that she seemed cold, distant, and had no taste in dress. Behind her back, she was called la petite bourgeoise allemande.

Instead of letting the gossips affect her, Empress Maria paid great attention to the upbringing and education of her children, carefully choosing experienced teachers and ensuring their environment was strict. Her efforts centered on her eldest son, Tsarevich Nicholas Alexandrovich, her favorite child who resembled her most.

Empress Maria expressed her anger about Queen Victoria's negative view of Russia and her poor treatment of her daughter-in-law and Empress Maria's daughter, Grand Duchess Maria Alexandrovna of Russia. She complained to her brother Louis III, Grand Duke of Hesse that England was "certainly hostile to us. That makes the Tsar very anxious, on Marie's account too." When she learned about Queen Victoria's negative view of Russians, she wrote "The insulting things that the Queen says in her letters to Alfred about the Tsar and the Russian people are worthy of a fish-wife. Added to this is her grief that 'our dear Marie' should belong to a nation from whose vocabulary the words truth, justice, and humanity are lacking. Silly old fool." When her daughter Maria complained about Queen Victoria, she sympathized with Maria: "To be quite frank, it is difficult to take such a mother-in-law seriously, and I am sorry on Marie's account."

== Declining health ==
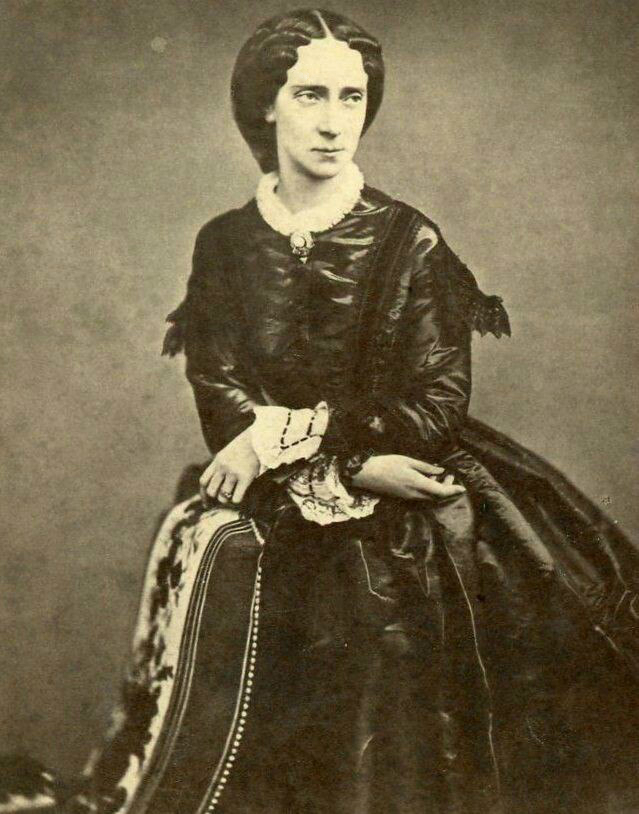
Empress Maria Alexandrovna wearing a mourning dress.

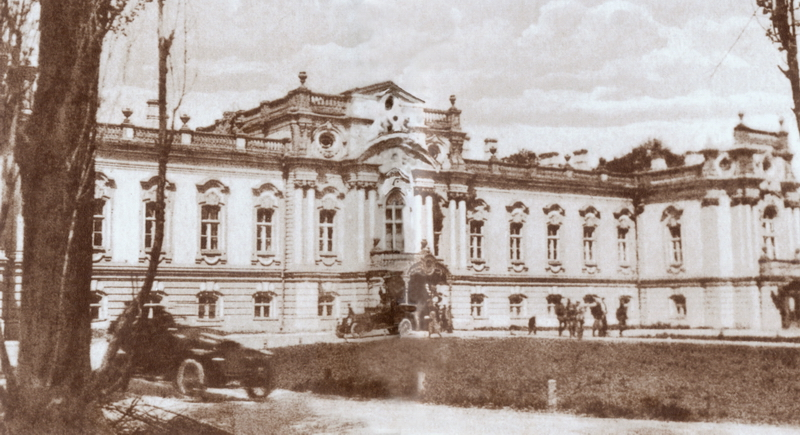
The Mariinskyi Palace as it appeared in 1918.

As Empress consort, Maria Alexandrovna had to attend many state functions, but from the 1860s her health declined. The doctors advised her to spend the winters in a warm climate and stop intercourse with her husband in an effort to prolong her life. Preferring to remain in Russia, she agreed to the suggestion of recuperating in Crimea. Alexander II then bought for his wife the Livadia villa, a two-story wooden villa from the heirs of Polish Count Lev Potocki. At the end of August 1861, Maria, her husband, and their children Alexei, Sergei and Paul visited Crimea for the first time. She was charmed by the southern flora, the mild climate, the beautiful house, and the surrounding park. The modest villa was expanded with the additions of a large palace, a small palace, and a church. Construction took place between 1862 and 1866 under the direction of Ippolito Monighetti, a Russian architect who had redecorated her apartments in the Catherine Palace in the 1850s.

Feeling better, Maria Alexandrovna financed the Mariinsky Theatre in St. Peterburg in 1859–1860, built according to the plans of architect Albert Cavos as an opera and ballet house. The theatre opened on 2 October 1860, with a performance of Mikhail Glinka's opera A Life for the Tsar. The new theatre was named Mariinsky after its imperial patroness. (The name was changed into Kirov Theatre during the Soviet period, but the original name was restored in 1992, and at present there is a bust of the Empress in the main entrance foyer.)

The humid summers in Saint Petersburg began to take a toll on Maria's frail constitution, to the point she was absent from Russia's capital for long periods of time. In June 1864, she left Russia, accompanied by her husband and their three youngest children, to take the waters in the Bavarian spa of Bad Kissingen. King Ludwig II of Bavaria came to meet his distant aunt and became infatuated with her. In late July, Alexander II returned to Russia, but Maria traveled to Bad Schwalbach, where she celebrated her birthday with Ludwig II. In late August, the whole family was reunited in Darmstadt.

As she was still sick, Maria Alexandrovna spent the winter in Nice, where she received the announcement of the Tsarevich's engagement to Princess Dagmar of Denmark. Nicholas was nevertheless in frail health and joined his mother in Nice in early 1865, but was seriously ill with meningitis of the spine by then. Attended by her brother Alexander and her sister-in-law, the Empress did not leave her son's side during his illness. Nicholas was initially misdiagnosed with simple rheumatism and deteriorated rapidly. The whole family gathered around his deathbed on 24 April [O.S. 12 April] 1865. Princess Dagmar, who was with the Romanovs during her fiancé's final days, was quickly engaged to his brother, the future Emperor Alexander III, whom she would marry the following year. Both Alexander II and Maria were devastated by the death of their eldest son on whom their hopes for the future lay. The Tsarina spent the following year grieving and found some solace with her family in Hesse, since her brother Karl had recently lost his only daughter Anna.

In 1866, Alexander II and Maria Alexandrovna celebrated their silver wedding anniversary. With the passing of the years, they still respected each other but grew apart romantically, particularly after the deterioration of her health and the death of their eldest children. Alexander had many affairs, but they did not threaten their marriage. From the mid-1850s until 1862, he had a relationship with Princess Alexandra Sergeevna Dolgorukova, member of the House of Dolgorukov, one of Russia's most illustrious families and the Tsarina's ladies-in-waiting. This affair ended in 1862 when Alexandra married General Pyotr Pavlovich Albedinsky (1826–1883).

In 1865, Alexander II fell deeply in love with 18-year-old Princess Ekaterina Mikhailovna Dolgorukova, a distant cousin of his former mistress. Catherine resisted his advances for over a year, but they became lovers in July 1866. Empress Maria inevitably heard about the affair, but she initially did not attach great importance to it.

In order to have comfortable accommodations and rest in their route from St. Petersburg to Crimea, Alexander II ordered the reconstruction of the Imperial Palace in Kiev. It was in total disrepair and abandoned for almost half a century after the palace burned down in a series of fires in the early 19th century. The commission was assigned in 1867 to the architect Konstantin Mayevsky, using old drawings and watercolors as guide. Work took place from 1868 to 1870 and the Kievan palace was then renamed Mariinskyi Palace after the Empress Maria Alexandrovna. By her wish, a large park was established off the southern side of the palace. The palace was used as a residence for visiting members of the imperial family until 1917. Currently it is the official ceremonial residence of the President of Ukraine.

== Last years ==
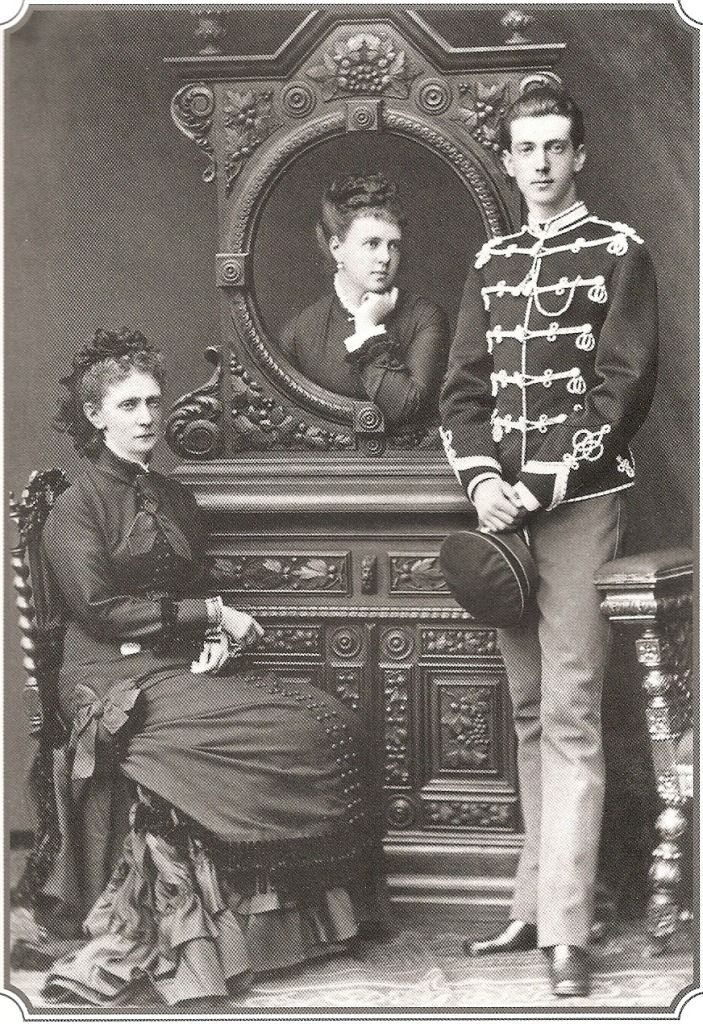
Empress Maria Alexandrovna with two of her children: Grand Duchess Maria Alexandrovna and Grand Duke Paul Alexandrovich.

From the early 1860s through the 1870s, Maria Alexandrovna began to pay extended visits to her homeland. Usually accompanied by her husband, children and their Russian entourage, she stayed at Schloss Heiligenberg, the small castle of her brother Alexander, who lived with his morganatic wife and their children at Jugenheim outside Darmstadt. There she met Princess Alice, second daughter of Queen Victoria and wife of her nephew Louis of Hesse. She resisted Alice's suggestion that her brother, Prince Alfred, Duke of Edinburgh, marry her only daughter Maria, but the couple would wed anyway in 1874. In December 1875, Empress Maria visited England to meet her first British grandchild. Queen Victoria wrote in her diary: "I thought her very ladylike, kind and amiable. We were at ease at once, but she has a sad expression and looks so delicate. I think we should get on very well together, poor thing. I pity her much."

After Princess Alice died in 1878, it was Maria Alexandrovna's turn to pity the British royal family. She invited her motherless relatives to visit during the holidays she spent with brother Alexander at Heiligenberg. It was during these visits that her second youngest son Sergei met his future wife, Alice's second daughter, Princess Elisabeth of Hesse and by Rhine. It was also here that Maria met Elisabeth's youngest surviving sister, Princess Alix, who would eventually become the devoted and ill-fated wife of Maria's eldest grandson, Emperor Nicholas II. A legend alleges that on a visit to Darmstadt, upon meeting Alix, Empress Maria turned to her ladies-in-waiting with the words, "Kiss her hand. That is your empress to be."

Tsar Alexander had three children with Princess Dolgorukova, whom he moved into the Imperial Palace during Maria's final illness out of fear that she might become the target of assassins. The affair, in the face of the Tsarina's declining health, served to alienate the rest of his adult children, save their son Alexei and their daughter. When the Grand Duchess Marie made a visit to her mother in May 1880, she was horrified to learn of the imperial mistress' living arrangements and confronted her father. Courtiers spread stories that the dying Empress was forced to hear the noise of Catherine's children moving about overhead, but their rooms were actually far away from each other. After Maria Alexandrovna asked to meet her husband's children with Catherine, he brought their two older children, George and Olga, to her deathbed, where she kissed and blessed both children. Both rulers were in tears during the meeting. With her blessing, the couple entered into a morganatic marriage on 18 July [O.S. 6 July] 1880.

Empress Maria Alexandrovna died on 3 June 1880, aged 55. She was buried with full dignity with her children present and remembered for her wisdom and grace. In later years, Nicholas II's eldest daughter, Grand Duchess Olga, claimed that as a small child she saw the ghost of her great-grandmother, according to her nanny Margaretta Eagar.

== Issue ==
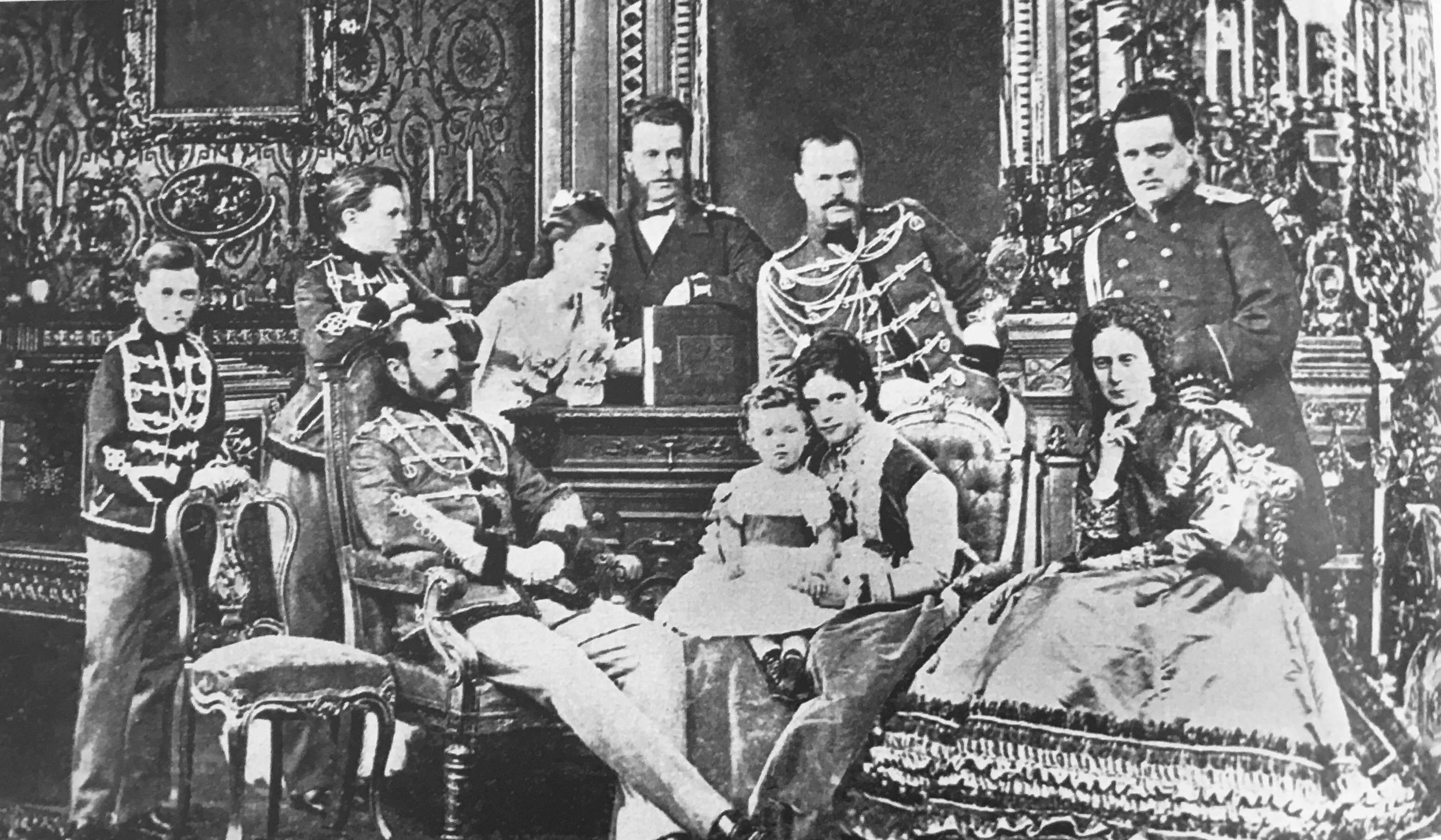
Empress Maria Alexandrovna with her husband and children. Seated in the first row, left to right are: Emperor Alexander II, Tsarevna Maria Feodorovna with her son Grand Duke Nicholas Alexandrovich on her lap, and Empress Maria Alexandrovna. In the second row, same order: Grand Duke Paul Alexandrovich, Grand Duke Sergei Alexandrovich, Grand Duchess Maria Alexandrovna, Grand Duke Alexei Alexandrovich, Tsarevich Alexander Alexandrovich, and Grand Duke Vladimir Alexandrovich. c 1870.

Through her marriage with Alexander II, Maria Alexandrovna gave birth to and raised eight children, which consisted of six sons and two daughters:

Name	Birth	Death	Notes
Grand Duchess Alexandra Alexandrovna	30 August 1842	10 July 1849	nicknamed Lina, died of infant meningitis in St. Petersburg at the age of six
Tsesarevich Nicholas Alexandrovich	20 September 1843	24 April 1865	engaged to Dagmar of Denmark (Maria Feodorovna)
Emperor Alexander III	10 March 1845	1 November 1894	married 1866, Dagmar of Denmark (Maria Feodorovna); had issue
Grand Duke Vladimir Alexandrovich	22 April 1847	17 February 1909	married 1874, Marie of Mecklenburg-Schwerin (Maria Pavlovna); had issue
Grand Duke Alexei Alexandrovich	14 January 1850	14 November 1908
Grand Duchess Maria Alexandrovna	17 October 1853	20 October 1920	married 1874, Alfred, Duke of Saxe-Coburg and Gotha; had issue
Grand Duke Sergei Alexandrovich	11 May 1857	17 February 1905	married 1884, Elisabeth of Hesse (Elizabeth Feodorovna);
Grand Duke Paul Alexandrovich	3 October 1860	24 January 1919	married 1889, Alexandra of Greece and Denmark (Alexandra Georgievna); had issue – second marriage 1902, Olga Karnovich; had issue

== Honours ==
- Kingdom of Portugal: Dame of the Order of Queen Saint Isabel, 20 February 1861
- Spain: Dame of the Order of Queen Maria Luisa

The city of Mariinsk in Kemerovo Oblast, and the city of Mariehamn in Åland are named after Empress Maria.

== Ancestry ==
Ancestors of Maria Alexandrovna (Marie of Hesse)

8. Louis IX, Landgrave of Hesse-Darmstadt (= 14)
4. Louis I, Grand Duke of Hesse and by Rhine
9. Countess Palatine Caroline of Zweibrücken (= 15)
2. Louis II, Grand Duke of Hesse and by Rhine
10. Prince George William of Hesse-Darmstadt
5. Princess Louise of Hesse-Darmstadt
11. Countess Maria Louise Albertine of Leiningen-Dagsburg-Falkenburg
1. Princess Marie of Hesse and by Rhine
12. Charles Frederick, Grand Duke of Baden
6. Charles Louis, Hereditary Prince of Baden
13. Princess Caroline Louise of Hesse-Darmstadt
3. Princess Wilhelmine of Baden
14. Louis IX, Landgrave of Hesse-Darmstadt (= 8)
7. Princess Amalie of Hesse-Darmstadt
15. Countess Palatine Caroline of Zweibrücken (= 9)

== Notes ==
Maria Alexandrovna (Marie of Hesse) House of Hesse-Darmstadt Cadet branch of the House of Hesse Born: 8 August 1824 Died: 3 June 1880
Russian royalty
Preceded by Alexandra Feodorovna (Charlotte of Prussia)	Empress consort of Russia; 1855–1880	Vacant Title next held by Maria Feodorovna (Dagmar of Denmark)
