= Princess Amalie of Hesse-Darmstadt =

Amalie of Hesse-Darmstadt
- Hereditary Princess of Baden
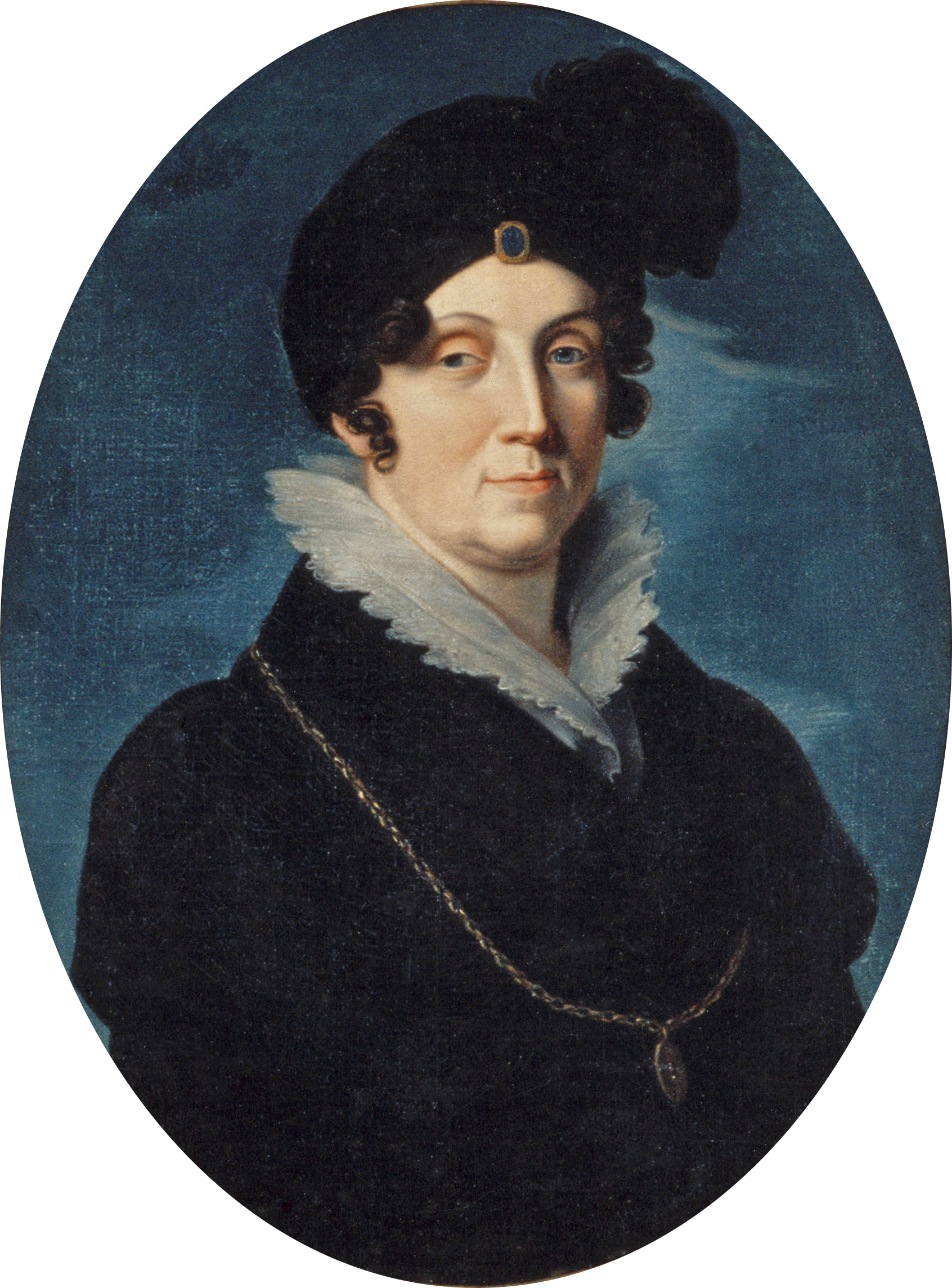
- Portrait, 1811
- Born: 20 June 1754; Prenzlau
- Died: 21 June 1832 (aged 78); Bruchsal
- Burial: Schlosskirche St. Michael, Pforzheim
- Spouse: Charles Louis, Hereditary Prince of Baden (m. 1774; died 1801)
- Issue: Princess Amalie; Karoline, Queen of Bavaria; Louise, Empress of Russia; Frederica, Queen of Sweden; Marie, Duchess of Brunswick-Wolfenbüttel; Prince Karl Friedrich; Karl, Grand Duke of Baden; Wilhelmine, Grand Duchess of Hesse and by Rhine
Names
- Friederike Amalie
- House: Hesse-Darmstadt
- Father: Ludwig IX, Landgrave of Hesse-Darmstadt
- Mother: Henriette Karoline of Palatine-Zweibrücken

Princess Amalie of Hesse-Darmstadt (20 June 1754 – 21 June 1832) was a Hereditary Princess of Baden by marriage to Charles Louis, Hereditary Prince of Baden. She was the daughter of Ludwig IX, Landgrave of Hesse-Darmstadt and Henriette Karoline of Palatine-Zweibrücken.

== Life ==
Amalie was born in Prenzlau and was brought to St Petersburg with her mother in 1772 to visit the Russian court as one of the candidates for a marriage with the Tsarevich Paul Petrovich; Paul, however, decided upon her sister Wilhelmine.

=== Hereditary Princess of Baden ===
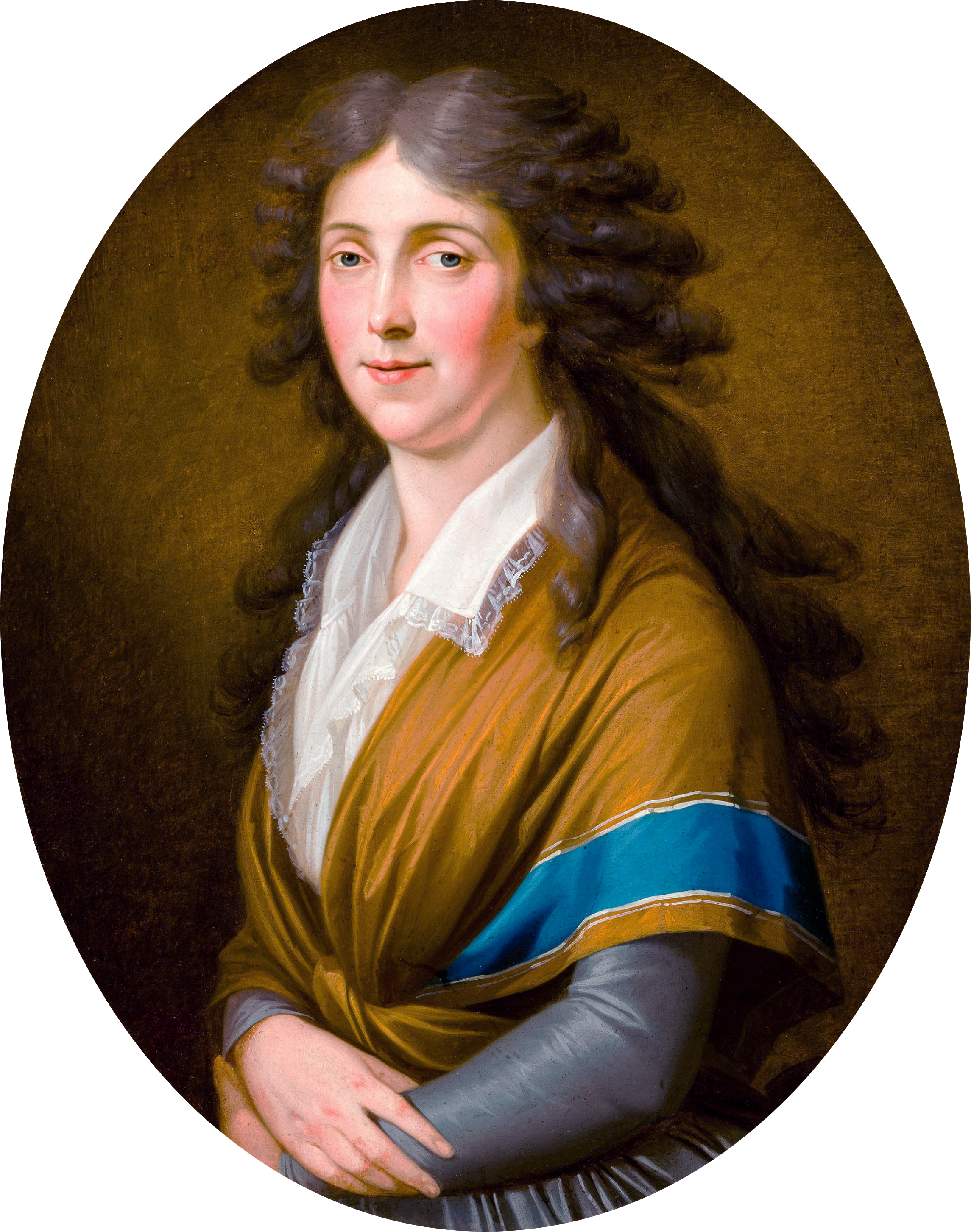
Her potrait, by Philipp Friedrich von Hetsch, 1790.

Amalie married her first cousin, Charles Louis, Hereditary Prince of Baden on 15 July 1774. He was the son of Margrave Charles Frederick (who in 1806, after his father's death, became the 1st Grand Duke of Baden) and Princess Karoline Luise of Hesse-Darmstadt, the daughter of Ludwig VIII of Hesse-Darmstadt.

During her marriage, Amalie complained about her father-in-law's coldness and the childish behaviour of her husband. Amalie also missed the Prussian and Russian courts. She served ceremoniously as the first lady of the court from the death of her mother-in-law in 1783 until the marriage of her son in 1806. In 1801, she visited her daughter Louise (Empress Elizabeth) in Russia with her family, and thereafter her second daughter, the Swedish Queen Friederike, in Sweden in September 1801. During Amalie's stay in Sweden, she was described as witty, intelligent and correct, and fully dominated her spouse. They visited Drottningholm Palace and Gripsholm Castle. Amalie befriended Hedwig Elizabeth Charlotte of Holstein-Gottorp, which was disliked by the King, and reprimanded her daughter about her stiff and unfriendly manners in public. In December 1801, her husband died due to an accident near Arboga, and she remained in Sweden with her family until May 1802. Shortly before her departure, she was inducted in the Yellow Rose lodge of Karl Adolf Boheman, by him referred to as a branch of the Freemasons.

=== Later years ===
During her visits in Russia and Sweden she made attempts to reconcile her sons-in-law, the Russian and Swedish monarchs with each other. In 1803, she received the royal Swedish family as guests in Baden, during which it was said that she had the chance to gain influence over her son-in-law, as she was lovable and amusing, had a lively interest in politics and the same views as him. It was said of Amalie that: "The Landgravine of Baden could in power hunger and will force measure up to that of Catherine II". As an opponent of Napoleon Bonaparte, she had tried to prevent the wedding of her son to Stéphanie de Beauharnais, and after their wedding in 1806, she retired to her widow estate at Schloss Bruchsal in the Kraichgau. In 1807, Amalie sent her daughter, Queen Frederica of Sweden, a letter from her second daughter, the Empress of Russia, in an attempt to convince Frederica to use her influence to persuade her spouse to make peace between Sweden and Napoleon, which did not succeed.

In 1809, she received her daughter Frederica and her family upon the deposition of her son-in-law from the Swedish throne. In 1811, she tried to persuade Gustav Adolf not to divorce Frederica, but when it proved necessary, she arranged for her daughter's economic independence and the custody of her grandchildren. In 1815, her grandson Gustav of Sweden was referred to as "Prince of Sweden" in an announcement from the Baden court, which caused protests from Jean Baptiste Bernadotte, who believed it to have been instigated by Amalie, as she had a reputation for plotting, in an attempt to secure a throne for her grandson. During the Congress of Vienna in 1815, Amalie's influence upon her son-in-law Tsar Alexander I contributed to the fact that Baden was allowed to remain a Grand Duchy without loss of territory.

She died in Bruchsal, aged 78, having outlived her husband and six of their eight children.

== Issue ==
- Princess Katharine Amalie Christiane Luise ( Amalie Christiane von Baden ) (13 July 1776 – 26 October 1823)
- Princess Friederike Caroline Wilhelmine (13 July 1776 – 13 November 1841), married on 9 March 1797 the then Duke Maximilian of Zweibrücken as his second wife (and became grandmother of Empress Elisabeth of Austria). In 1799 her husband became Elector Palatine and Elector of Bavaria, and in 1804 King of Bavaria (her titles accordingly being Duchess, then Electress, then Queen).
- Princess Louise Marie Auguste (24 January 1779 – 16 May 1826), married on 9 October 1793 Tsar Alexander I of Russia.
- Princess Frederica Dorothea Wilhelmine (12 March 1781 – 25 September 1826), married on 31 October 1797 King Gustav IV Adolf of Sweden. They divorced in 1812.
- Princess Marie Elisabeth Wilhelmine (7 September 1782 – 29 April 1808), married on 1 November 1802 Friedrich Wilhelm, Duke of Brunswick-Wolfenbüttel.
- Prince Karl Friedrich (13 September 1784 – 1 March 1785), died in infancy.
- Prince Karl, the future 2nd Grand Duke of Baden (8 June 1786 in Karlsruhe – 8 December 1818 in Rastatt)
- Princess Wilhelmine Luise (10 September 1788 – 27 January 1836) married on 19 June 1804 her first cousin Grand Duke Ludwig II of Hesse. She was the mother of Princess Marie of Hesse and by Rhine, who married Tsar Alexander II of Russia.

== Ancestry ==
Ancestors of Princess Amalie of Hesse-Darmstadt

8. Ernest Louis, Landgrave of Hesse-Darmstadt
4. Louis VIII, Landgrave of Hesse-Darmstadt
9. Princess Dorothea Charlotte of Brandenburg-Ansbach
2. Louis IX, Landgrave of Hesse-Darmstadt
10. Johann Reinhard III, Count of Hanau-Lichtenberg
5. Countess Charlotte of Hanau-Lichtenberg
11. Princess Dorothea Friederike of Brandenburg-Ansbach
1. Amalie of Hesse-Darmstadt
12. Christian II, Count Palatine of Zweibrücken-Birkenfeld
6. Christian III, Count Palatine of Zweibrücken
13. Katharina Agathe of Rappoltstein
3. Countess Palatine Caroline of Zweibrücken
14. Louis Crato, Count of Nassau-Saarbrücken
7. Countess Caroline of Nassau-Saarbrücken
15. Philippine Henriette of Hohenlohe-Langenburg
