= Tsesarevich =

Title of the heir apparent or presumptive in the Russian Empire

Imperial Standard of the Tsesarevich

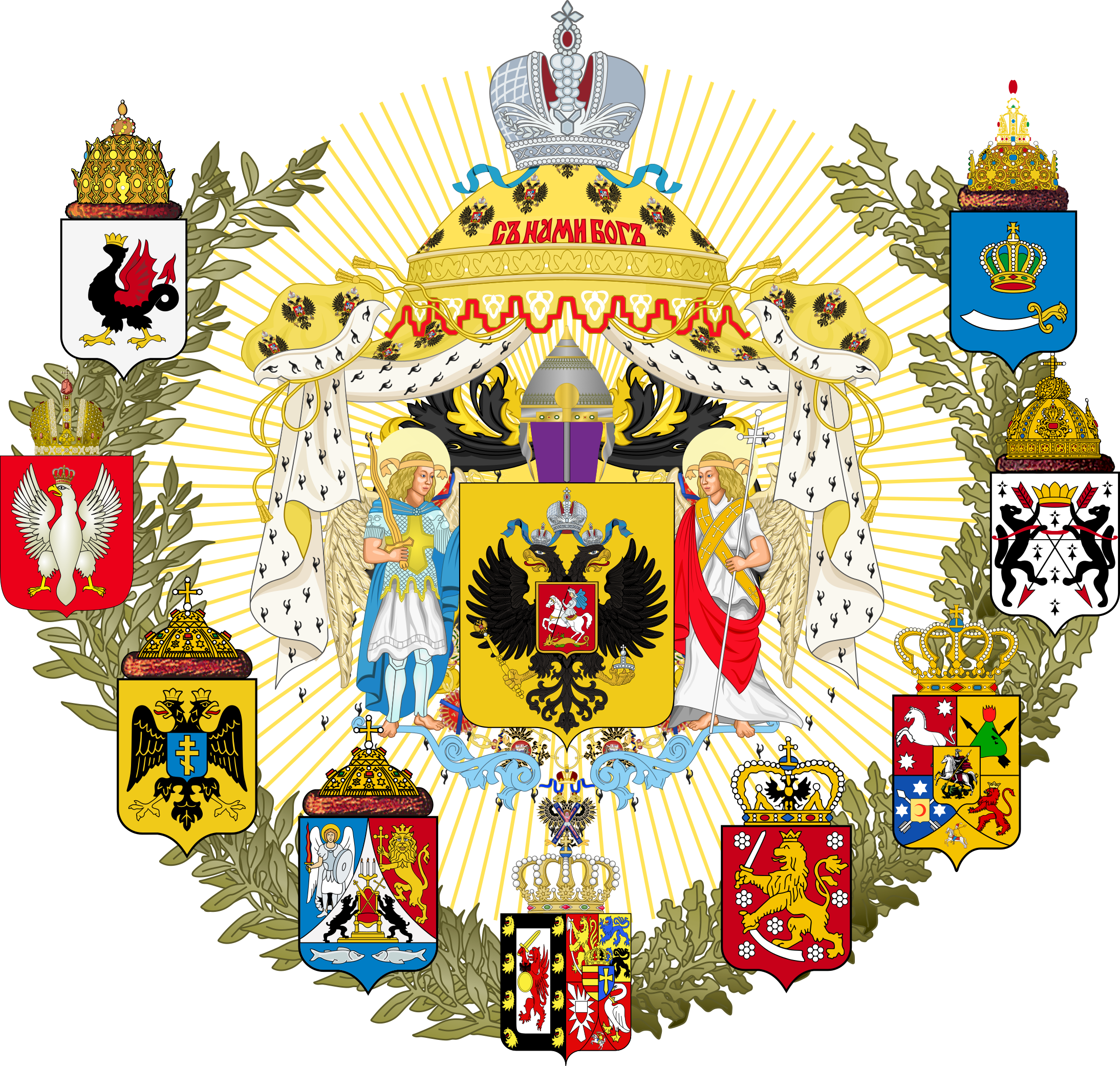
Coat of Arms

Tsesarevich (Russian: цесаревич, IPA: [tsɨsɐˈrʲevʲɪtɕ]) was the title of the heir apparent or presumptive in the Russian Empire. It either preceded or replaced the given name and patronymic.

== Usage ==
It is often confused with the much more general term tsarevich, the title for any son of any tsar, including non-Russian rulers such as those of Crimea, Siberia, and Georgia.

Normally, there was only one tsesarevich at a time (an exception was Grand Duke Konstantin Pavlovich, who was accorded the title until death, even though law gave it to his nephew), and the title was used exclusively in Russia.

The title came to be used invariably in tandem with the formal style "Successor" (Russian: наследник, romanized: naslednik), as in "His Imperial Highness the Successor Tsesarevich and Grand Prince". The wife of the Tsesarevich was the tsesarevna (Russian: цесаревна).

== History ==
In 1721 Peter the Great discontinued use of "tsar" as his main title, and adopted that of imperator (emperor), whereupon the title of tsarevich (and "tsarevna", retained for life by Ivan V's daughters) fell into disuse. The Emperor's daughters were henceforth referred to as "tsesarevna" (Peter had no living son by this time). In 1762, upon succeeding to the imperial throne, Peter III accorded his only son Paul Petrovich (by the future Catherine the Great) the novel title of tsesarevich, he being the first of nine Romanov heirs who would bear it. However, at the time the title was conferred, Paul was recognised as Peter's legal son, but not as his legal heir. Nor would he be officially recognised as such by his mother after her usurpation of the throne.

More often he was internationally referred to by his other title of "Grand Duke" ("великий князь"; the actual meaning in Russian language is "Grand Prince". "Grand Duke", a title not used, would have been "великий герцог" "velikij gertsog" from German Herzog, duke), which pre-dated tsesarevich, being a holdover from the Rurikid days before the grand dukes of Muscovy adopted the title of tsar. When Paul acceded to the throne in 1796, he immediately declared his son Aleksandr Pavlovich tsesarevich, and the title was confirmed by law in 1797 as the official title for the heir to the throne (incorporated into Article 145 of the Fundamental Laws). In 1799 Paul I granted the title tsesarevich to his second son Constantine Pavlovich, who, oddly, retained the title even after he renounced the throne in 1825 in favor of their younger brother, Nicholas I.

Thenceforth, each Emperor's eldest son bore the title until 1894, when Nicholas II conferred it on his brother Grand Duke George Aleksandrovich, with the stipulation that his entitlement to it would terminate upon the birth of a son to Nicholas, who was then betrothed to Alix of Hesse. When George died in 1899, Nicholas did not confer the title upon his oldest surviving brother Michael Aleksandrovich, although Nicholas's only son would not be born for another five years. That son, Alexei Nikolaevich (1904–1918), became the Russian Empire's last tsesarevich.

=== Tsesarevich of Russia ===
Heir	Status	Relationship to monarch	Became heir		Ceased to be heir		Duration as heir	Tsesarevna	Monarch
Heir	Status	Relationship to monarch	Date	Reason	Date	Reason	Duration as heir	Tsesarevna	Monarch
Paul Petrovich	Heir apparent	Eldest son	9 July 1762	Mother became emperor	17 November 1796	Became emperor	34 years, 4 months and 8 days	Wilhelmina Louisa of Hesse-Darmstadt Sophie Dorothea of Württemberg	Catherine II
Alexander Pavlovich	Heir apparent	Eldest son	17 November 1796	Father became emperor	24 March 1801	Became emperor	4 years, 4 months and 7 days	Louise of Baden	Paul I
Constantine Pavlovich	Heir presumptive	Younger brother	24 March 1801	Brother became emperor without children	1 December 1825	Abdicated	24 years, 8 months and 7 days	Juliane of Saxe-Coburg-Saalfeld	Alexander I
Alexander Nikolaevich	Heir apparent	Eldest son	1 December 1825	Father became emperor	2 March 1855	Became emperor	29 years, 3 months and 1 day	Marie of Hesse and by Rhine	Nicholas I
Nicholas Alexandrovich	Heir apparent	Eldest son	2 March 1855	Father became emperor	24 April 1865	Died	10 years, 1 month and 22 days	None	Alexander II
Alexander Alexandrovich	Heir presumptive	Younger brother	24 April 1865	Older brother died without children	13 March 1881	Became emperor	15 years, 10 months and 17 days	Dagmar of Denmark	Alexander II
Nicholas Alexandrovich	Heir apparent	Eldest Son	13 March 1881	Father became emperor	1 November 1894	Became emperor	13 years, 7 months and 19 days	None	Alexander III
George Alexandrovich	Heir presumptive	Younger brother	1 November 1894	Brother became emperor without children	10 July 1899	Died	4 years, 8 months and 9 days	None	Nicholas II
Michael Alexandrovich	Heir presumptive	Younger brother	10 July 1899	Older brother died, emperor still without proper heir	12 August 1904	Heir born to emperor	5 years, 1 month, and 2 days	None	Nicholas II
Alexei Nikolaevich	Heir apparent	Eldest son	12 August 1904	Born	15 March 1917	Monarchy abolished	12 years, 7 months and 3 days	None	Nicholas II

=== Tsesarevna of Russia ===
The wife of an heir-tsesarevich bore the title Tsesarevna (Russian: Цесаревна) – Grand Duchess. In first years of Russian Empire the female heirs of Peter I of Russia bore this title: his daughters Elizabeth of Russia (born 1709), Anna Petrovna (1708–1728) and Natalia Petrovna (1718–1725). This word is not to be confused with Tsarevna, used before 18th century for all the Tsar's daughters and daughters-in-law.

Many princesses from Western Europe, who converted to Orthodox Christianity and changed their given names accordingly, were given the patronymic Fyodorovna not because their fathers were named "Theodore", but as an allegory based on the name of Theotokos of St. Theodore, the patron icon of the Romanov family.

Picture	Name	Father	Birth	Marriage	Became Tsesarevna	Ceased to be Tsesarevna	Death	Spouse
	Maria Alexandrovna born Marie of Hesse and by Rhine	Louis II, Grand Duke of Hesse (Hesse-Darmstadt)	8 August 1824	28 April 1841		2 March 1855 became Empress	3 June 1880	Tsesarevich Alexander Nikolaevich
	Maria Feodorovna born Dagmar of Denmark	Christian IX of Denmark (Schleswig-Holstein-Sonderburg-Glücksburg)	26 November 1847	9 November 1866		13 March 1881 became Empress	13 October 1928	Tsesarevich Alexander Alexandrovich

=== Post-monarchy ===
After claiming the Russian throne in exile in 1924 Grand Duke Kirill Vladimirovich designated his son, Grand Duke Vladimir Kirillovich, Tsesarevich. Since 1997 the title has been attributed to Vladimir's grandson, George Mikhailovich Romanov, whose mother, Maria Vladimirovna, conferred it on him in her capacity as pretender to the throne. Those who refer to him by a dynastic title, however, more usually address him as "grand duke".

Until the end of the empire most people in Russia and abroad, verbally and in writing continued to refer to the Sovereign as "tsar". Perhaps for that reason the title of tsesarevich was less frequently used to refer to the heir apparent than either "tsarevich" or "grand duke".

== See also ==
- List of heirs to the Russian throne
