= Schloss Heiligenberg (Jugenheim) =

Castle to the east of Jugenheim, Germany

Coordinates: 49°45′05″N 8°38′51″E

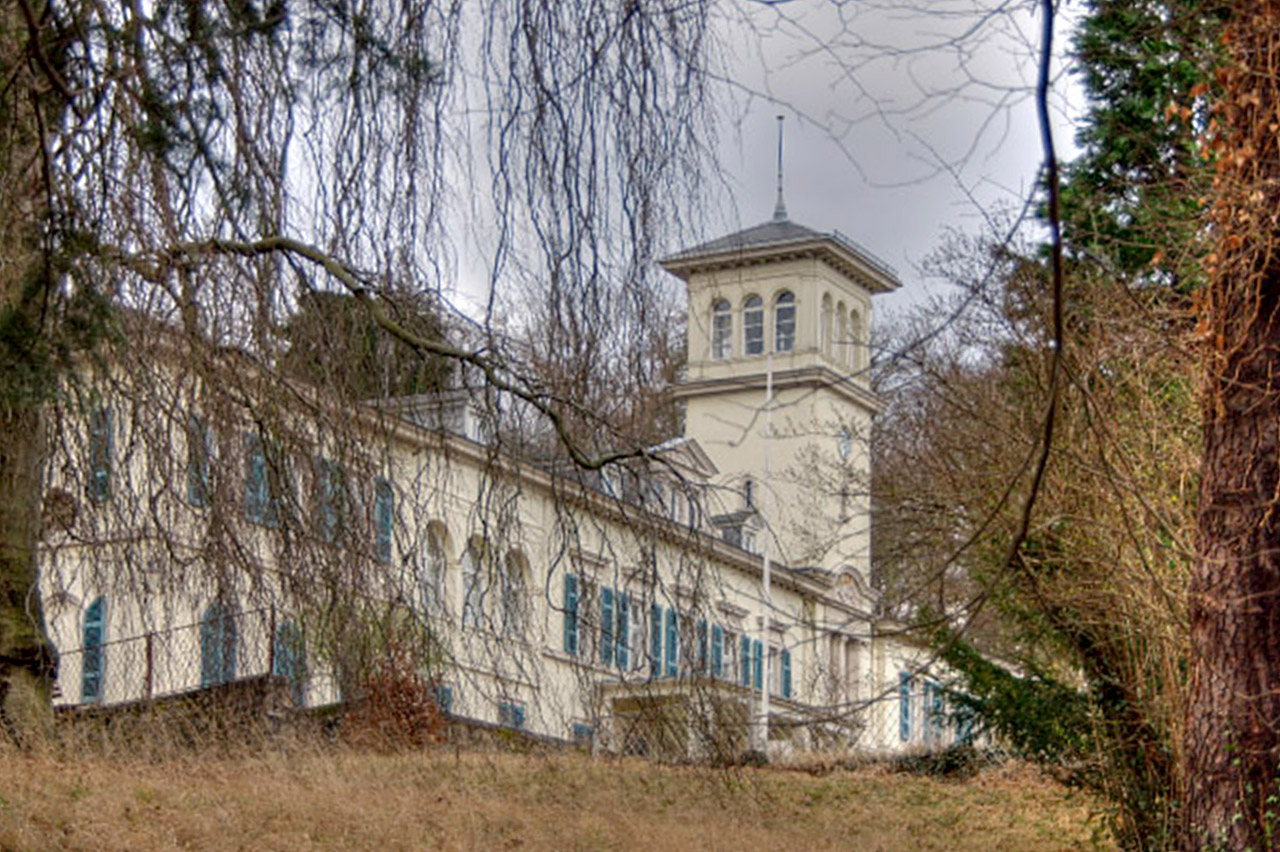
Schloss Heiligenberg

Schloss Heiligenberg is a castle to the east of Jugenheim, part of Seeheim-Jugenheim, about 12 kilometres to the south of Darmstadt, Germany. It is built on the Heiligenberg, with panoramic views of the Rhineland as far as the Palatinate. It is now the headquarters of the Amt für Lehrerbildung, though its 'Gartensaal' is occasionally used for concerts and art exhibitions.

== Castle ==
At the start of the nineteenth century a castle was built on the Heiligenberg. Grand Duchess Wilhelmine of Hesse-Darmstadt and her son, Prince Alexander of Hesse-Darmstadt, added an extension designed by Georg Moller in 1862–1867. Alexander (1823–1888), third son of Grand Duke Louis II of Hesse-Darmstadt, from 1852 onwards mainly lived in Darmstadt or at the Schloss Heiligenberg, at least when he was not on campaign. On 28 October 1851 he entered a morganatic marriage with countess Julia Hauke, a lady in waiting to his sister, Tsarina Maria Alexandrovna of Russia. Alexander and Julia were the founders of the Battenberg/Mountbatten line. Due to the family's wide-ranging royal connections, until 1914 the Schloss regularly hosted the Russian Tsar and his family as well as many other kings, princes and diplomats.

== Bibliography ==
- Thomas Biller: Burgen und Schlösser im Odenwald. Ein Führer zu Geschichte und Architektur. Schnell und Steiner, Regensburg 2005, ISBN 3-7954-1711-2, S. 62–64.
- Schlösser, Burgen, alte Mauern. Herausgegeben vom Hessendienst der Staatskanzlei, Wiesbaden 1990 ISBN 3-89214-017-0, S. 329.
