= Grand Duchess Alexandra Alexandrovna of Russia =

Grand Duchess of Russia (1842–1849)

Grand Duchess Alexandra Alexandrovna
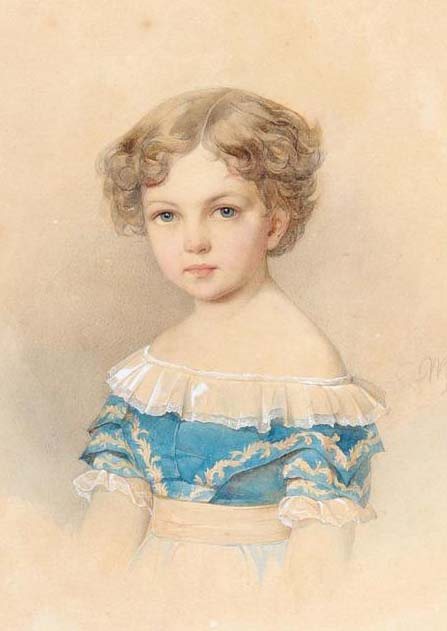
- Born: 30 August 1842; Winter Palace, Saint Petersburg, Russian Empire
- Died: 10 July 1849 (aged 6); Winter Palace, Saint Petersburg, Russian Empire
- Burial: Peter and Paul Cathedral, Saint Petersburg, Russian Empire
- House: Holstein-Gottorp-Romanov
- Father: Alexander II of Russia
- Mother: Marie of Hesse and by Rhine

Grand Duchess Alexandra Alexandrovna of Russia (30 August 1842 – 10 July 1849) was the eldest child and first daughter of Tsar Alexander II of Russia and his first wife Marie of Hesse and by Rhine. She died from infant meningitis at the age of six and a half.

== Life and death ==
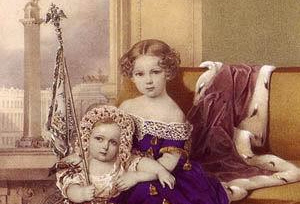
Alexandra with her younger brother Nicholas

She was nicknamed "Lina" or "Sashenka" within her family. Her father enjoyed having her keep him company while he worked in his study. Her death from infant meningitis at the age of six and a half devastated her parents. Her mother was still brought to tears by the mention of her eldest child decades after her death. Her father placed a dried flower from her funeral mass in his diary and marked the page in black to signify mourning. They were thrilled when they had a second daughter, Grand Duchess Maria Alexandrovna of Russia, because they had so missed having a little girl in the family.

== Ghostly visit ==
The ghost of Alexandra supposedly appeared along with that of her grandfather, Nicholas I of Russia, during two palace séances during the 1860s organized by Grand Duchess Alexandra Iosifovna. The Tsar and others at court were interested in the spiritualism that was fashionable at the time. At one of the meetings, the table rose a few centimeters, spun and rapped out the words to "God Save the Tsar!" The Tsar and others present claimed he felt the touch of ghostly fingers. The spirits responded to questions asked by Alexander II, answering by rapping the letters of the alphabet, which he wrote down painstakingly on paper in front of him. A lady-in-waiting later complained that the answers were meaningless and wondered why they were more interested in playing games than providing real answers to the Tsar's questions. Alexandra's mother refused to come to the second séance, having decided that the ghosts were "spirits of lies" manipulated by the devil and her daughter had not actually appeared.

== Portrait and mementoes on display ==
A blue silk frock worn by Alexandra was still on display in the Winter Palace fifty years after her death, according to Margaretta Eagar. "A pretty golden-haired child she was, too, judging from her portrait," wrote Eagar, a nurse for the four daughters of Nicholas II and Tsarina Alexandra Feodorovna.

== Name considered unlucky ==
Eagar also wrote that the name Alexandra was considered unlucky in the House of Romanov by the late 19th century because so many Romanov Alexandras had died as children or in their teens. The British public had wondered why none of the Tsarina's daughters was named in her honor; Eagar explained that the name was not used, despite the fact that Alexandra was their mother's name, because it was considered so unlucky. Other ill-fated Alexandras were Grand Duchess Alexandra Pavlovna, Grand Duchess Alexandra Nikolaevna and Grand Duchess Alexandra Mikhailovna (infant daughter of Grand Duke Michael Pavlovich of Russia). Eagar wrote that other branches of the family had named daughters Alexandra, but none lived past age twenty-one.
