= Assen Hartenau =

- Count of Hartenau
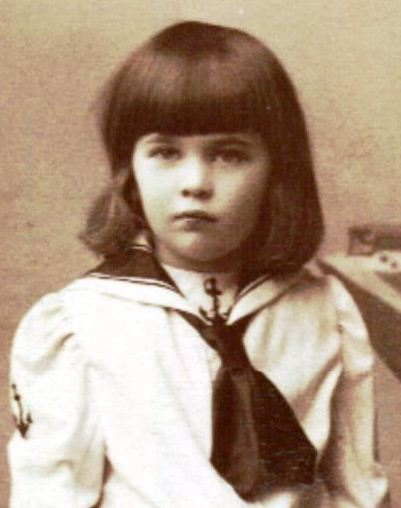
- Photo of Assen Ludwig Alexander, Graf von Hartenau in 1894 (aged 3–4)
- Born: 16 January 1890; Graz, Austria-Hungary
- Died: 15 March 1965 (aged 75); Vienna, Austria
- Spouse: Bertha Hussa-Lamos (m. 1934)
- Issue: Wilhelm Hartenau (adoptive)
- House: Battenberg
- Father: Alexander of Battenberg
- Mother: Johanna Loisinger

Assen or Asen Hartenau (Note: Different sources ascribe Hartenau slightly different full names. Two variants are Louis Alexander Assen, Count of Hartenau and Krum Asen Louis Alexander von Hartenau.) (16 January 1890 – 15 March 1965), in his early life styled as the Count of Hartenau, was an Austrian civil servant and the son of the deposed Bulgarian prince Alexander of Battenberg (r. 1879–1886).

== Biography ==
=== Early life ===
Assen Ludwig Alexander, Graf von Hartenau was born in Graz on 16 January 1890, the son and eldest child of Alexander of Battenberg, deposed Prince of Bulgaria (r. 1879–1886), and his wife Johanna Loisinger, an actress and singer. He was named after the medieval Bulgarian ruler Ivan Asen I (r. 1188–1196), co-founder of the Second Bulgarian Empire (1185–1422). The name thus served to underline the claims of Alexander and his family to the Bulgarian throne.

Hartenau had a younger sister, Svetana (1893–1935). After Alexander's early death in 1893, Johanna and the children moved to Vienna. The family was in exile provided with a yearly pension of 50,000 leva by the Bulgarian government. Following Alexander's deposition and marriage to Johanna, he had styled himself as the Count of Hartenau, a title inherited by Assen.

=== Career ===
Hartenau studied law at the University of Graz and eventually became a Doctor of Law. He eventually dropped the title of count and became an Austrian civil servant. Through his life he held various important financial and political positions in Austria. He was employed in the Ministry of Finance from 1919 to 1922 and served as a diplomat in Paris from 1922 to 1928, mainly overseeing payment of war reparations. In 1938, Hartenau was made the State Commissioner of the Oesterreichische Nationalbank. He played an important role in settling the Austrian national debt in the 1940s.

After World War II (1939–1945), Hartenau was deemed to have been "politically indifferent" during the war. From 1951 to 1953, he served as the financial director of Zellwolle Lenzing AG. Hartenau died in Vienna on 15 March 1965.

== Personal life ==
Hartenau married Bertha Hussa-Lamos (1892–1971) on 7 May 1934. The couple did not have any children together, though Hartenau adopted Hussa-Lamos's son Wilhelm (from a previous marriage), who thus became Wilhelm Hartenau (1915–1991). Wilhelm was a physician in Vienna and had three children of his own; Alexander, Elizabeth and Francisca, regarded as the heirs of Alexander of Battenberg. (Note: Given that Hartenau's sister Svetana did not have any biological children either, Alexander of Battenberg otherwise has no living descendants.)

During the reign of Alexander's successor in Bulgaria, Ferdinand I (r. 1887–1918), the Bulgarian press sometimes highlighted Hartenau as a legitimate possible rival contender for the throne, styling him as "Prince" and as "His Highness".
