= Nicholas Alexandrovich, Tsesarevich of Russia =

Russian imperial prince (1843–1865)

Nicholas Alexandrovich
- Tsesarevich of Russia
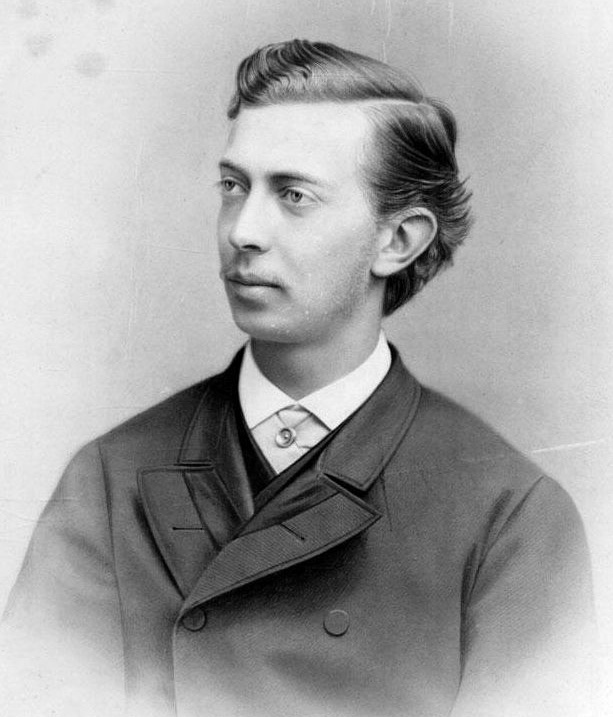
- Nicholas Alexandrovich, c. 1864–65
- Born: 20 September 1843; Alexander Palace, Tsarskoye Selo, Saint Petersburg, Russian Empire
- Died: 24 April 1865 (aged 21); Villa Bermond, Nice, Second French Empire
- Burial: Peter and Paul Cathedral, St. Petersburg, Russian Empire
Names
- Nicholas Alexandrovich Romanov
- House: Holstein-Gottorp-Romanov
- Father: Alexander II of Russia
- Mother: Marie of Hesse and by Rhine

Nicholas Alexandrovich (Russian: Николай Александрович; 20 September [O.S. 8 September] 1843 – 24 April [O.S. 12 April] 1865) was tsesarevich—the heir apparent—of Imperial Russia from 2 March 1855 until his death in 1865.

== Early life ==
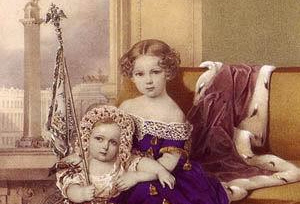
Nicholas with his elder sister Alexandra, who died in childhood.

Grand Duke Nicholas was born on 20 September [O.S. 8 September] 1843, in the Alexander Palace in Tsarskoye Selo south of central Saint Petersburg, during the reign of his grandfather, Emperor Nicholas I. Nicknamed "Nixa", he was the eldest son of the Tsesarevich Alexander Nikolaevich, eldest son of Emperor Nicholas I, and the Tsesarevna Maria Alexandrovna of Russia. In 1855, his paternal grandfather died, and his father succeeded to the throne as Emperor Alexander II.

Nicholas was extremely well-educated and intelligent. His paternal uncle Grand Duke Konstantin called him "the crown of perfection." His history teacher said, “If I succeeded in forming a student equal to Nikolai Alexandrovich once in ten years, I’d think I’d have fulfilled my duties."

Nicholas had a close relationship with his younger brother, Grand Duke Alexander. He called Alexander "Pug." On his deathbed, he told his father, "Papa, take care of Sasha, he is such an honest, good man."

== Engagement ==
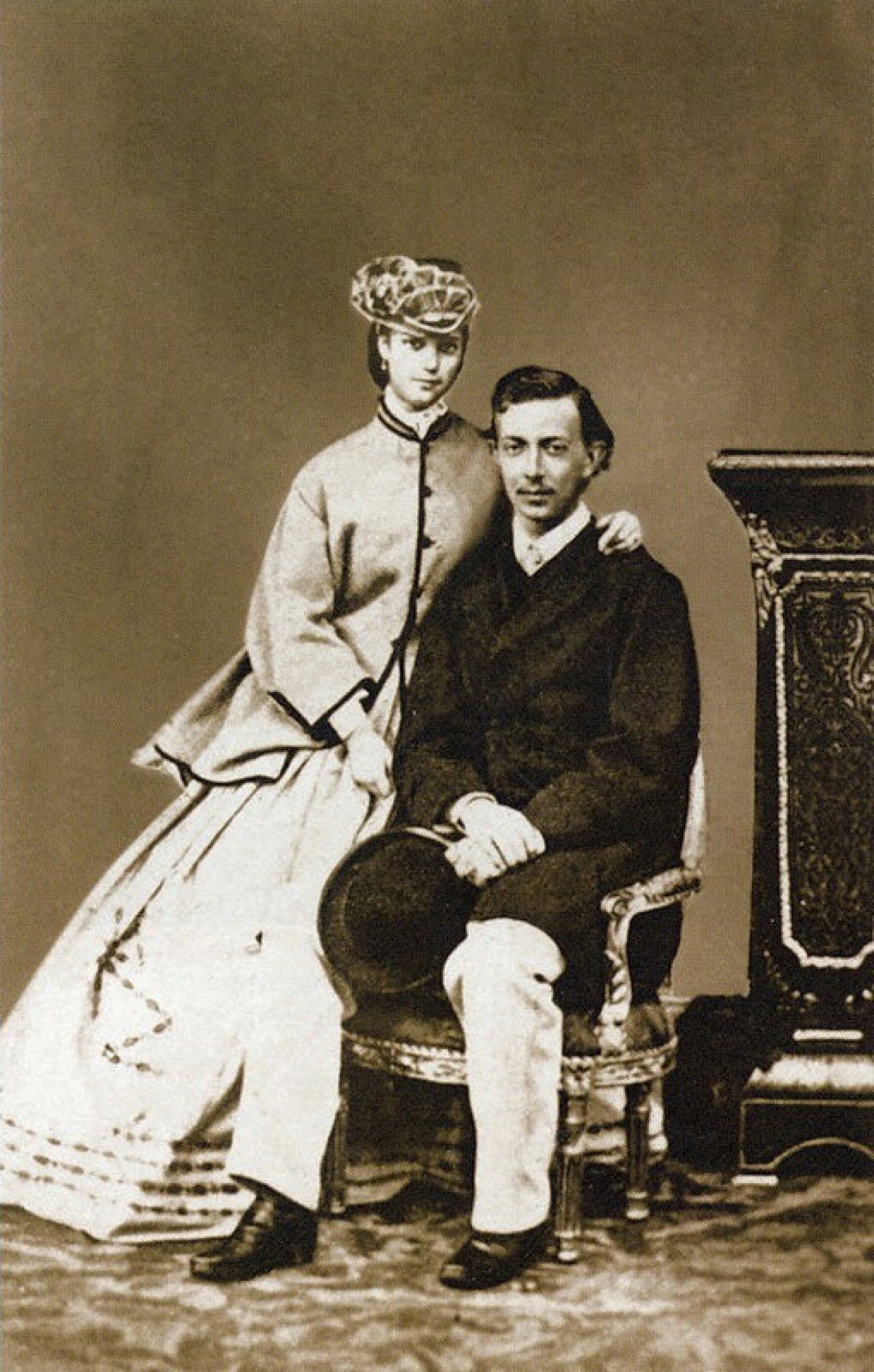
Tsesarevich Nicholas with Princess Dagmar of Denmark, engagement photograph, 1864

In the summer of 1864, Nicholas became engaged to Princess Dagmar of Denmark. She was the second daughter of King Christian IX and Queen Louise of Denmark and was a younger sister of the Princess of Wales, later Queen Alexandra and wife of the heir-apparent to the British throne, Albert Edward, who reigned as Edward VII.

Nicholas was besotted with Dagmar after he saw a photograph of her. On 3 August 1863, he wrote to his mother: "I haven’t fallen in love with anyone for a long time. . . You may laugh but the main reason for this is Dagmar whom I fell in love with long ago without even seeing her. I think only about her.” He was tremendously happy after he proposed to Dagmar in her native Denmark: “How can I not be happy when my heart tells me I love her, love her dearly?. . . How can I describe her? Pretty, direct, intelligent, lively yet shy.” As he continued on his European tour, he wrote love letters to Dagmar every day.

== Death ==
Until 1865, Nicholas was thought to have a strong constitution. During a tour in southern Europe, he contracted an ailment that was initially incorrectly diagnosed as rheumatism. Nicholas's symptoms at that time included back pain and a stiff neck, as well as sensitivity to noise and light. He thought little of his ailments, however, and continued his tour in Italy.

His health rapidly worsened, and he was sent to Southern France. This move brought him no improvement. It was eventually determined that he was suffering from cerebro-spinal meningitis, and it was speculated that this illness of his was caused by a previous accident in a wrestling match, in which Nicholas participated and was thrown down. In the spring of 1865, Nicholas continued to decline, and he died on 24 April 1865, at the Villa Bermond in Nice, France.

On his deathbed, Nicholas expressed the wish that his fiancée become the bride of his younger brother and future Tsarevich, Alexander. He "raised his right hand and took Sasha's [Alexander's] hand ... and seemed to be reaching for Princess Dagmar's with his left." In 1866, Alexander and Dagmar married.

Nicholas's death at the early age of 21 thoroughly devastated his mother, who was said to have pored obsessively over all aspects of Nicholas's life. Empress Maria never recovered from his death.

In 1867, construction was begun on a chapel named in his honor (fr:Chapelle du tsarévitch Nicolas Alexandrovitch) in Nice, on the exact place where Nicholas was said to have died, and in 1868, the chapel was inaugurated, with his brother Alexander and his wife, the re-christened Maria Feodorovna, in attendance.

== Honours ==
- Russian Empire:
  - Knight of St. Andrew, 1843
  - Knight of St. Alexander Nevsky, 1843
  - Knight of the White Eagle, 1843
  - Knight of St. Anna, 1st Class, 1843
- Austrian Empire: Grand Cross of St. Stephen, 1860
- Baden:
  - Knight of the House Order of Fidelity, 1857
  - Grand Cross of the Zähringer Lion, 1857
- Kingdom of Bavaria: Knight of St. Hubert, 1859
- Belgium: Grand Cordon of the Order of Leopold (military), 28 August 1859
- Denmark: Knight of the Elephant, 20 September 1859
- French Empire: Grand Cross of the Legion of Honour, 20 September 1859
- Kingdom of Hanover:
  - Knight of St. George, 1859
  - Grand Cross of the Royal Guelphic Order, 1859
- Grand Duchy of Hesse: Grand Cross of the Ludwig Order, 5 March 1855
- Oldenburg: Grand Cross of the Order of Duke Peter Friedrich Ludwig, with Golden Crown, 20 September 1859
- Kingdom of Portugal: Grand Cross of the Tower and Sword, 26 October 1859
- Kingdom of Sardinia: Knight of the Annunciation, 20 February 1859
- Kingdom of Saxony: Knight of the Rue Crown, 1859
- Spain: Knight of the Golden Fleece, 10 February 1857
- Sweden-Norway: Knight of the Seraphim, 20 September 1859
- Württemberg: Grand Cross of the Württemberg Crown, 1861
