= Princess Wilhelmine of Baden =

Grand Duchess of Hesse and by Rhine from 1830 to 1836

Wilhelmine of Baden
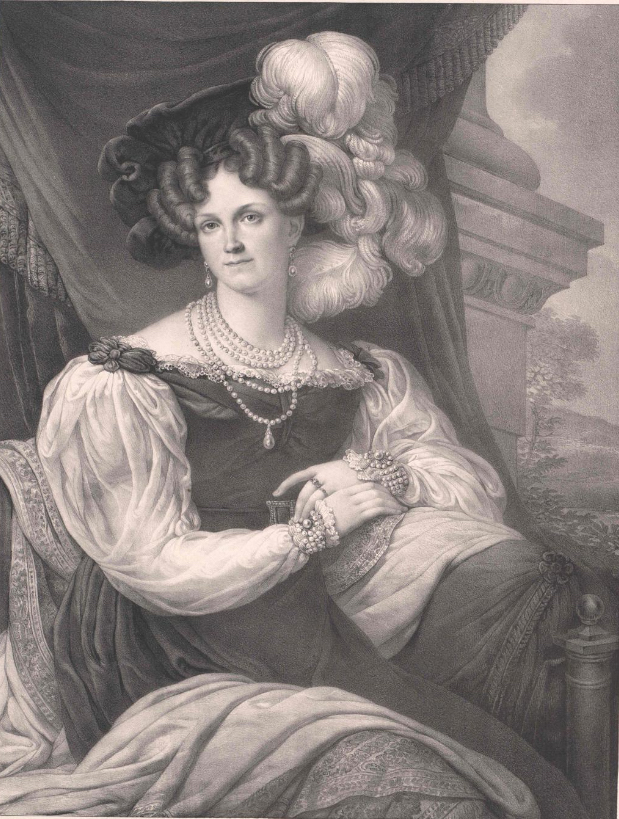
- Portrait c. 1810–20

Grand Duchess consort of Hesse and by Rhine
- Tenure: 6 April 1830 – 27 January 1836
- Born: 21 September 1788; Karlsruhe
- Died: 27 January 1836 (aged 47); Rosenhöhe
- Spouse: Louis II, Grand Duke of Hesse and by Rhine (m. 1804)
- Issue: Louis III, Grand Duke of Hesse and by Rhine; Prince Karl; Princess Elisabeth; Prince Alexander; Maria Alexandrovna, Empress of Russia
Names
- Wilhelmine Louise
- House: Zähringen
- Father: Charles Louis, Hereditary Prince of Baden
- Mother: Landgravine Amalie of Hesse-Darmstadt

Princess Wilhelmine of Baden (Wilhelmine Louise; 21 September 1788 – 27 January 1836), was by birth a Princess of Baden from the House of Zähringen and by marriage Grand Duchess consort of Hesse and by Rhine. Her descendants include King Charles III of the United Kingdom, King Felipe VI of Spain, and other members of European royalty.

She was the youngest daughter of Charles Louis, Hereditary Prince of Baden and Amalie of Hesse-Darmstadt, and the younger sister of Empress Elizabeth Alexeievna of Russia, born Princess Louise of Baden.

== Life ==
Princess Wilhelmine Louise of Baden was born on 21 September 1788 as the eighth and youngest child of Charles Louis, Hereditary Prince of Baden (1755–1801) and Amalie of Hesse-Darmstadt (1754–1832). In Karlsruhe on 19 June 1804, Wilhelmine married her maternal first cousin Louis, Hereditary Prince of Hesse-Darmstadt (1777–1848). The union proved to be unhappy due to Louis's extramarital affairs, and they separated after the birth of their three older children.

In 1820, she acquired Schloss Heiligenberg, where Baron August von Senarclens de Grancy (1794–1871) was the chamberlain, and they started an affair. Her last four children were believed to have been fathered by Senarclens de Grancy, although they were recognized by Grand Duke Louis II as his own. In 1830, following her father-in-law's death, she became Grand Duchess of Hesse and by Rhine.

== Issue ==
- Louis III, Grand Duke of Hesse (9 June 1806 – 13 June 1877).
- Stillborn son (18 August 1807).
- Prince Karl Wilhelm Ludwig of Hesse-Darmstadt (23 April 1809 – 20 March 1877).
- Princess Amalia Elisabeth Luise Karoline Friederike Wilhelmine of Hesse-Darmstadt (20 May 1821 – 27 May 1826).
- Stillborn daughter (7 June 1822).
- Prince Alexander Ludwig Georg Friedrich Emil of Hesse-Darmstadt (15 July 1823 – 15 December 1888)
- Princess Maximiliane Wilhelmine Auguste Sophie Marie of Hesse-Darmstadt (8 August 1824 – 3 June 1880); the future Empress consort of Tsar Alexander II of Russia.

Her descendants include Emperor Nicholas II of Russia (1868–1918) and his wife Empress Alexandra Feodorovna (1872–1918), last emperor and empress of Russia, her great-grandchildren; King Felipe VI of Spain (born 1968), the incumbent sovereign of Spain, her great-great-great-grandson; and King Charles III of the United Kingdom (born 1948), the incumbent sovereign of the United Kingdom, her great-great-great-grandson.

== Ancestry ==
Ancestors of Princess Wilhelmine of Baden

Frederick, Hereditary Prince of Baden-Durlach
Charles Frederick, Grand Duke of Baden
Princess Amalia of Nassau-Dietz
Charles Louis, Hereditary Prince of Baden
Louis VIII, Landgrave of Hesse-Darmstadt
Princess Caroline Louise of Hesse-Darmstadt
Countess Charlotte of Hanau-Lichtenberg
Princess Wilhelmine of Baden
Louis VIII, Landgrave of Hesse-Darmstadt
Louis IX, Landgrave of Hesse-Darmstadt
Countess Charlotte of Hanau-Lichtenberg
Princess Amalie of Hesse-Darmstadt
Christian III, Count Palatine of Zweibrücken
Countess Palatine Caroline of Zweibrücken
Countess Caroline of Nassau-Saarbrücken

== Sources ==
- Egon Caesar Conte Corti: Unter Zaren und gekrönten Frauen. Schicksal und Tragik europäischer Kaiserreiche an Hand von Briefen, Tagebüchern und Geheimdokumenten der Zarin Marie von Rußland und des Prinzen Alexander von Hessen. Editorial Pustet, 1949.
- Wilhelmine Louise, princess of Baden in: geneall.net [Retrieved 5 February 2016].

Princess Wilhelmine of Baden House of Zähringen Born: 21 September 1788 Died: 27 January 1836
German royalty
Vacant Title last held by Louise of Hesse-Darmstadt	Grand Duchess consort of Hesse and by Rhine; 16 April 1830 – 27 January 1836	Vacant Title next held by Mathilde Caroline of Bavaria
