= Johanna Loisinger =

Austrian opera singer (1865–1951)

- Countess von Hartenau
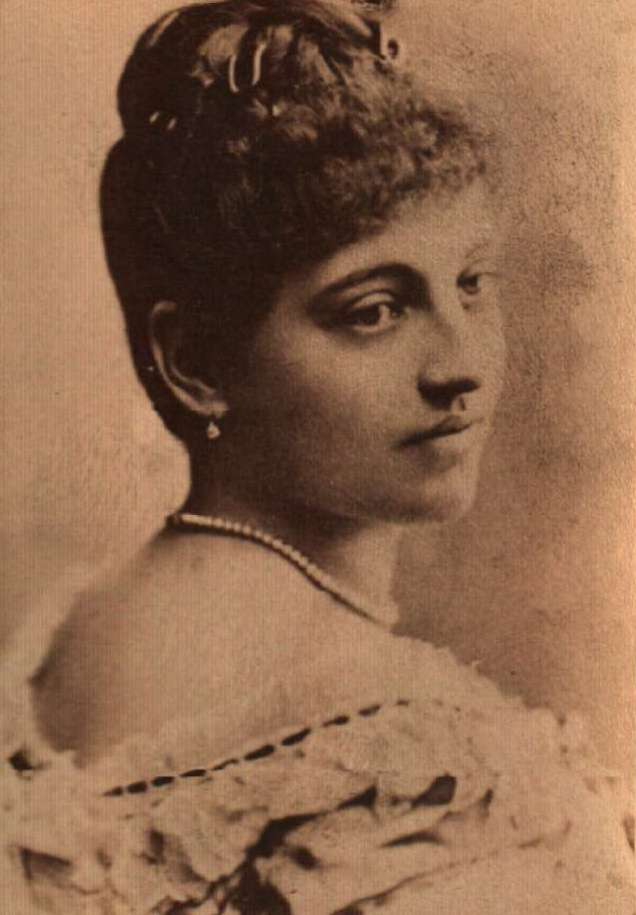
- Born: 18 April 1865; Preßburg, Kingdom of Hungary
- Died: 20 July 1951 (aged 86); Vienna
- Spouse: Alexander Battenberg (m. 1889; died 1893)
- Issue: Assen Hartenau; Zvetana Hartenau
- Father: John Loisinger
- Mother: Maria Meier
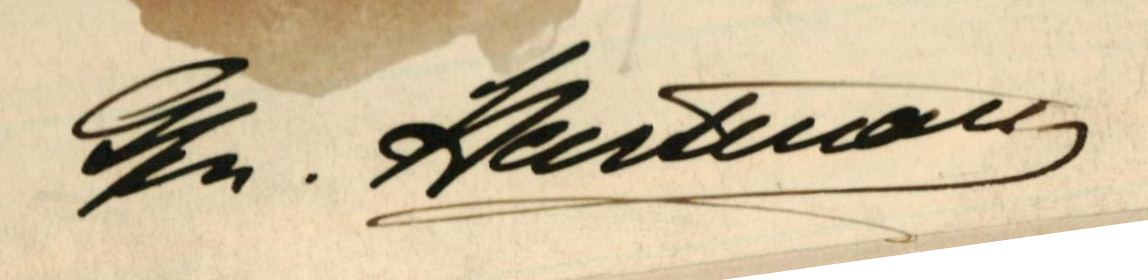
- Signature

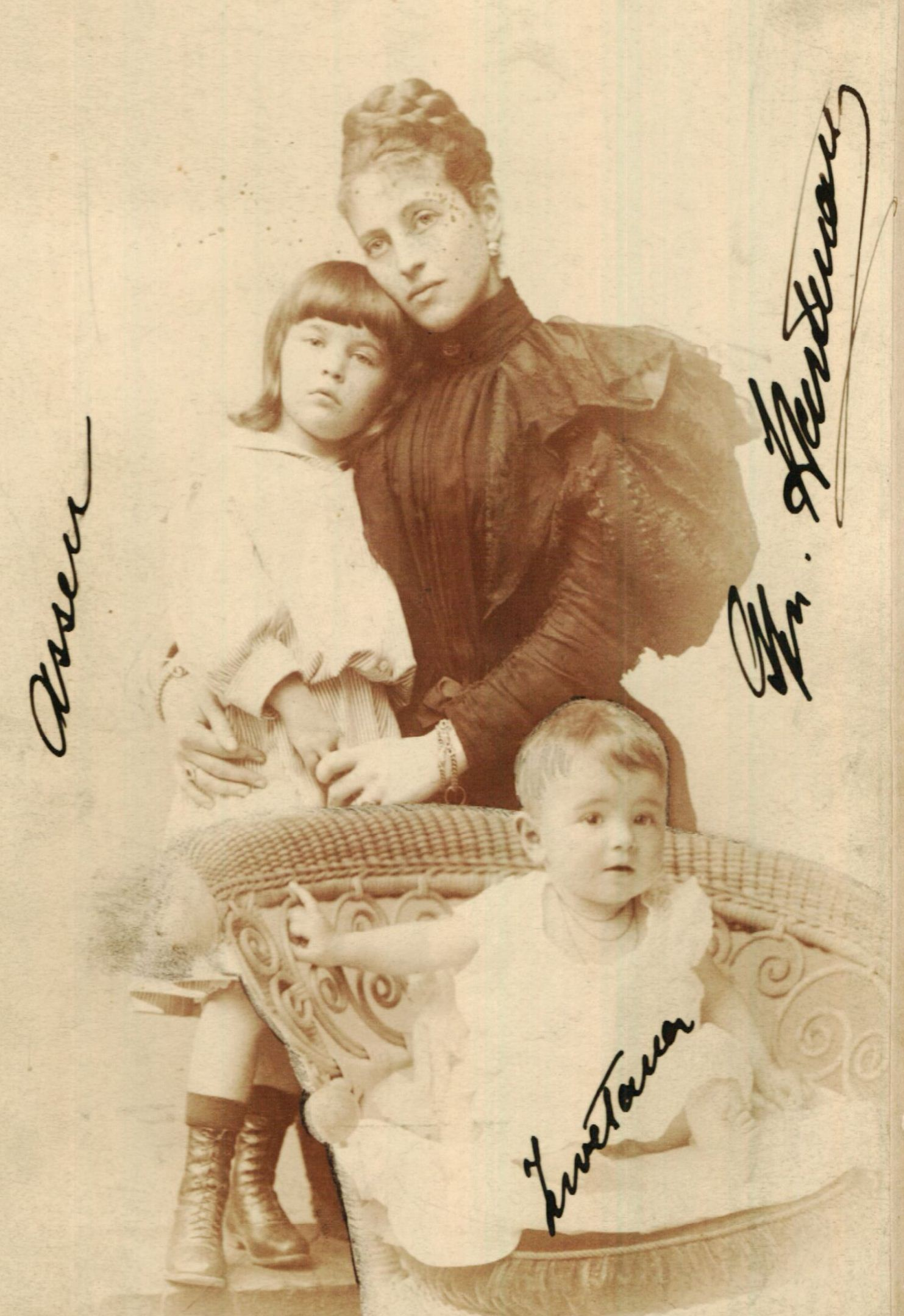
Johanna Loisinger with her two children, ca. 1894

Johanna Maria Louise Loisinger, Countess of Hartenau (18 April 1865 – 20 July 1951) was an Austrian actress, pianist and operatic soprano singer, who later became morganatic wife of Alexander Battenberg, the deposed ruler of the Principality of Bulgaria.

== Biography ==
She was born in Preßburg, Hungary (today Bratislava), the daughter of John Loisinger and his wife, Maria Meier.

After she had completed her singing studies, Loisinger sang in Prague, Troppau (today Opava), Linz and at the court theatre in Darmstadt. She was a well-known singer of the works of Mozart.

Loisinger married Prince Alexander of Battenberg (1857–1893) on 6 February 1889 in Menton, Alpes-Maritimes, France. The prince had resigned from the Bulgarian throne in 1886 and had assumed the style of Count von Hartenau, for himself and his legitimate male-line descendants, so Loisinger became the Countess von Hartenau.

The couple settled in Graz, Austria, and had two children, Assen (1890–1965) and Zvetana (1893–1935). After her husband's early death, she moved to Vienna, where she was an active patron of musical organisations. Among other posts, she was president of the Vienna Symphony.

== Death ==
Loisinger died on 20 July 1951 in Vienna, aged 86. She was buried in St. Leonhard Cemetery in Graz where her daughter Zvetana was previously buried.
