= Louis II of Hesse =

Grand Duke of Hesse and by Rhine from 1830 to 1848

Louis II
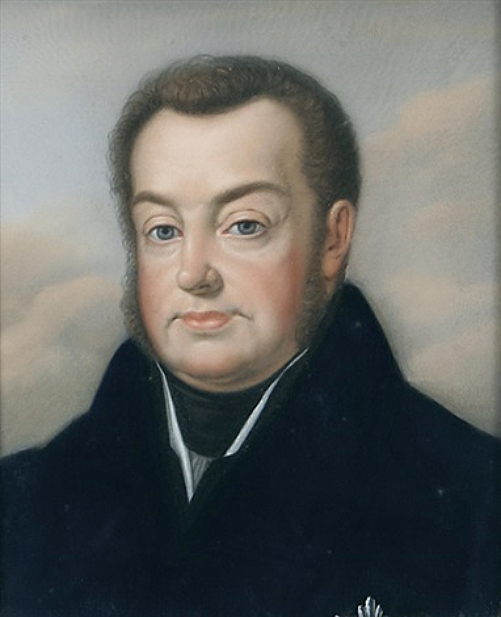
- Portrait by Gotthelf Leberecht Glaeser, c. 1850

Grand Duke of Hesse and by Rhine
- Reign: 6 April 1830 – 16 June 1848
- Predecessor: Louis I
- Successor: Louis III
- Born: 26 December 1777; Darmstadt
- Died: 16 June 1848 (aged 70); Darmstadt, Grand Duchy of Hesse
- Spouse: Princess Wilhelmine of Baden (m. 1804; died 1836)
- Issue: Louis III, Grand Duke of Hesse and by Rhine; Prince Karl of Hesse and by Rhine; Princess Elizabeth of Hesse and by Rhine; Prince Alexander of Hesse and by Rhine; Marie, Empress of Russia
- House: Hesse-Darmstadt
- Father: Louis I, Grand Duke of Hesse and by Rhine
- Mother: Princess Louise of Hesse-Darmstadt

Louis II (26 December 1777 – 16 June 1848) was Grand Duke of Hesse and by Rhine from 6 April 1830 until 16 June 1848. He was the son of Louis I, Grand Duke of Hesse, and Princess Louise of Hesse-Darmstadt.

== Life ==
=== Before his reign ===
He studied at Leipzig University. Thereafter, he lived mostly in Darmstadt. In 1804, he represented his father at the coronation of Napoleon in Paris. He took part in the Congress of Erfurt and the Congress of Vienna and attended the coronation of Louis XVIII in Paris.

Based on the 1820 Constitution of the Grand Duchy of Hesse, he was a member of the First Chamber of Parliament until becoming sovereign in 1830. He was not active in parliament apart from defending the constitution against any attempts to amend it, and was disinterested in governmental affairs, despite most cabinet ministers trying to include and brief him on current matters.

=== Reign ===
He began his reign on April 6, 1830. He provoked a conflict with parliament as he demanded that his large personal debt be taken over by the state. Due to his reactionary positions, he was in conflict with parliament almost his entire reign.

Shortly after becoming sovereign, he had to deal with uprisings in Upper Hesse, which he left to his brother Prince Emil. Emil and Prime Minister Karl du Thil were the actual government of the Grand Duchy at the time.

=== Resignation and death ===
The German revolutions of 1848–1849 showed his inability to govern. On March 5, 1848, he named his son Louis III as co-regent.

Following his death shortly afterwards, he was at first buried in the Stadtkirche Darmstadt, before his body was moved to the Old Mausoleum in Park Rosenhöhe in 1910.

== Marriage and issue ==
On 19 June 1804, in Karlsruhe, he married his first cousin Princess Wilhelmine of Baden, youngest daughter of Charles Louis, Hereditary Prince of Baden, and Amalie of Hesse-Darmstadt.

Due to Louis's affairs, the union proved an unhappy one, and the couple separated after the birth of their third child, who was his second surviving child.

Wilhelmine had four children in the 1820s, but it was widely rumored that their biological father was her chamberlain August von Senarclens de Grancy. Louis II nonetheless acknowledged them, and they were considered legitimate Princes and Princesses of Hesse and by Rhine by the nobles of Europe. Two of them lived to adulthood.

- Prince Ludwig of Hesse-Darmstadt (9 June 1806 – 13 June 1877); (the future Grand Duke).
- Stillborn son (18 August 1807).
- Prince Karl Wilhelm Ludwig of Hesse-Darmstadt (23 April 1809 – 20 March 1877).
- Princess Amalia Elisabeth Luise Karoline Friederike Wilhelmine of Hesse-Darmstadt (20 May 1821 – 27 May 1826).
- Stillborn daughter (7 June 1822).
- Prince Alexander Ludwig Georg Friedrich Emil of Hesse-Darmstadt (15 July 1823 – 15 December 1888)
- Princess Maximiliane Wilhelmine Auguste Sophie Marie of Hesse-Darmstadt (8 August 1824 – 3 June 1880); the future Empress consort of Alexander II of Russia.

== Ancestry ==
Ancestors of Louis II of Hesse

8. Louis VIII, Landgrave of Hesse-Darmstadt
4. Louis IX, Landgrave of Hesse-Darmstadt
9. Countess Charlotte of Hanau-Lichtenberg
2. Louis I, Grand Duke of Hesse
10. Christian III, Count Palatine of Zweibrücken
5. Countess Palatine Caroline of Zweibrücken
11. Countess Caroline of Nassau-Saarbrücken
1. Louis II, Grand Duke of Hesse and by Rhine
12. Louis VIII, Landgrave of Hesse-Darmstadt (= 8)
6. Prince George William of Hesse-Darmstadt
13. Countess Charlotte of Hanau-Lichtenberg (= 9)
3. Princess Louise of Hesse-Darmstadt
14. Christian Karl Reinhard of Leiningen-Dagsburg-Falkenburg
7. Countess Maria Louise Albertine of Leiningen-Dagsburg-Falkenburg
15. Countess Katharina Polyxena of Solms-Rödelheim

Louis II of Hesse House of Hesse-Darmstadt Cadet branch of the House of Hesse Born: 26 December 1777 Died: 16 June 1848
Regnal titles
Preceded by Louis I	Grand Duke of Hesse and by Rhine; 1830–1848	Succeeded by Louis III
