= Princess Marie of Battenberg =

Princess Marie
- Princess of Erbach-Schönberg
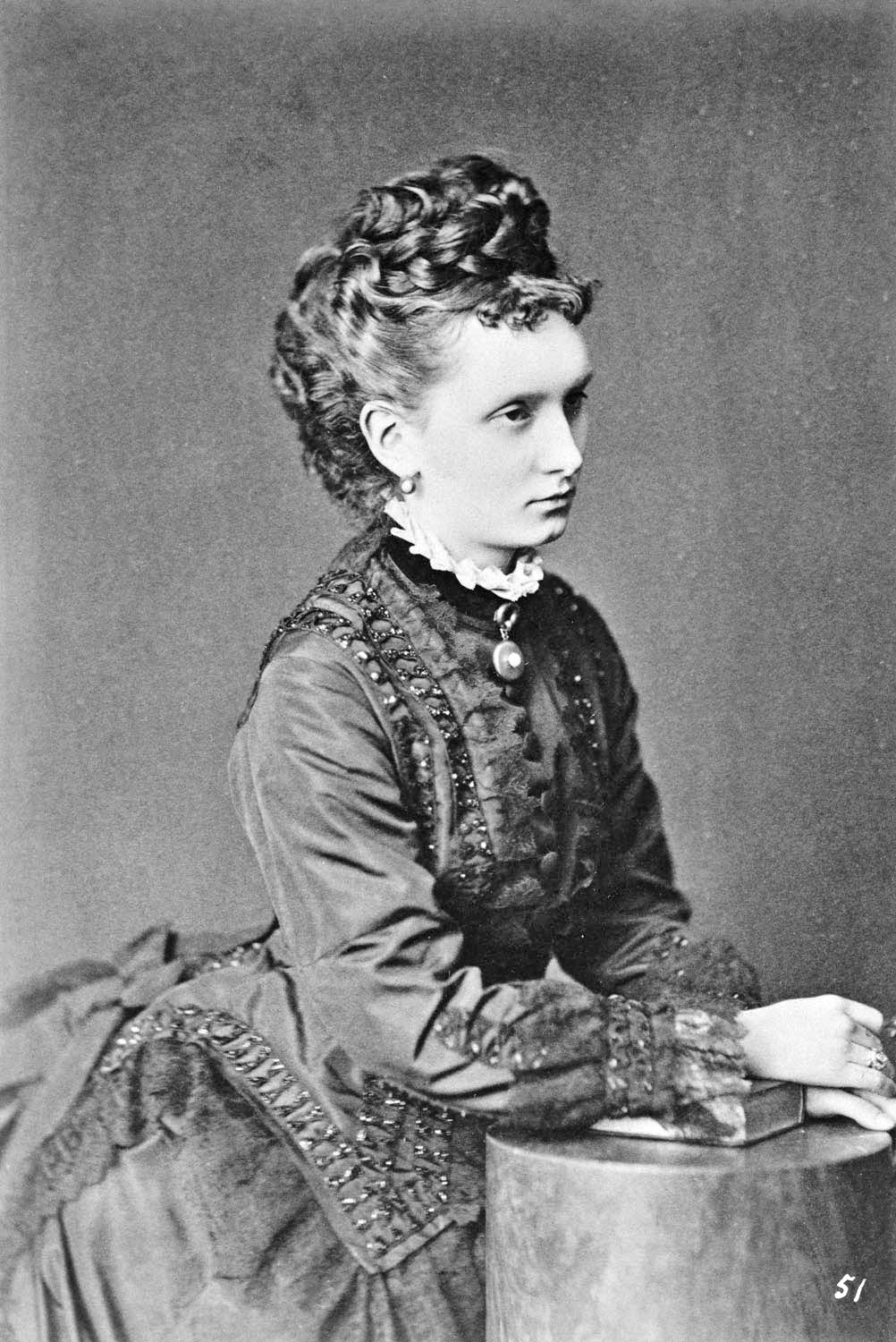
- Photograph c. 1874
- Born: 15 February 1852; Strasbourg, France
- Died: 20 June 1923 (aged 71); Schönberg, Weimar Republic
- Spouse: Gustav, Prince of Erbach-Schönberg (m. 1871; died 1908)
- Issue: Alexander, Prince of Erbach-Schönberg; Count Maximilian; Prince Victor; Marie, Princess Friedrich Wilhelm of Stolberg-Wernigerode
- House: Battenberg
- Father: Prince Alexander of Hesse and by Rhine
- Mother: Princess Julia of Battenberg

Princess Marie of Battenberg (German: Marie Karoline; 15 February 1852 – 20 June 1923) was a Princess of Battenberg and, by marriage, the Princess of Erbach-Schönberg. Although German noblewoman by birth, she worked as a writer and translator.

== Background and early life ==
Marie was the eldest child and only daughter of Prince Alexander of Hesse and by Rhine, founder of the House of Battenberg and his morganatic wife, the Countess Julia von Hauke, daughter of the Polish Count John Maurice von Hauke, by birth member of the Polonozed German Hauke family.

As a result of a morganatic marriage, Marie and her siblings were excluded from the succession of the Grand Duchy of Hesse, and bore the title Princes of Battenberg. Born four months after her parents married, Marie told people her birthday was 5 July, rather than 15 February. She was actually born in 15 February in Strasbourg, and not 15 July in Geneva.

Marie grew up in a wholesome family environment which was remarked upon by their royal relatives for its harmony and simplicity. She was the eldest of five children. She had four younger brothers, each highly distinguished in his own right. The eldest of her brothers was the Britain's First Sea Lord, Prince Louis of Battenberg, the father of Louise, Queen of Sweden and Earl Mountbatten; the maternal grandfather of Prince Philip of the United Kingdom. Her second brother was Prince Alexander of Battenberg, who was elected reigning Prince of Bulgaria in 1879. Her third brother was Prince Henry of Battenberg, who married Princess Beatrice, daughter of Queen Victoria, and was the father of Victoria Eugenie, Queen of Spain. Her fourth and youngest brother was Prince Francis Joseph of Battenberg, who married Princess Anna of Montenegro, a seventh child and sixth daughter of King Nicholas I of Montenegro, but the marriage remained childless.

In her memoirs, Marie described being sexually molested by her maternal cousin Alexander Hauke when she was ten years old, writing:

Sometimes it happened, when Adèle [her nanny] was not in the room, that he would seize me passionately and kiss me. I would struggle till he let me go, frightened and upset [...] He made me promise to say nothing about this even to mamma; I was his only comfort, which he could not afford to lose. The conflict worried me, and ended by my not being able to stand Cousin Alexander anymore.

Marie was godmother to her niece, Princess Alice of Battenberg, mother of Prince Philip, Duke of Edinburgh.

== Marriage and family ==
Princess Marie married on April 19, 1871 in Darmstadt, Count Gustav Ernst of Erbach-Schönberg, who was elevated to the rank of Prince (German: Fürst) in 1903. They had five children, including a stillborn son between 1873 and 1877:

- Alexander "Alexi", Prince of Erbach-Schönberg (12 September 1872 – 18 October 1944). He married Princess Elisabeth of Waldeck and Pyrmont, sister of Emma, Queen of the Netherlands, in 1900. They had four children.
- Count Maximilian "Maxi" of Erbach-Schönberg (17 March 1878 – 25 March 1892). He was mentally unstable and died at the age of 14.
- Prince Victor of Erbach-Schönberg (26 September 1880 – 27 April 1967). He married Countess Elisabeth Széchényi de Sarvar et Felsö-Vidék in 1909. They had no children.
- Princess Marie Elisabeth Donata "Edda" of Erbach-Schönberg (7 July 1883 – 12 March 1966). She married Prince Friedrich Wilhelm of Stolberg-Wernigerode (grandson of Otto of Stolberg-Wernigerode) in 1910. They had two children.

== Literary works ==
- Marie's brother Alexander was invited to the throne of Bulgaria in 1879 and became Prince of Bulgaria under the nominal suzerainty of the Caliph of Turkey. Her memoir of a visit to his court, My Trip to Bulgaria, was published in 1884.
- Marie also published her memoirs, which places her relationship with her mentally-unstable son Maximilian in an essential role.
- Marie translated two works authored by Edith Jcob, The Gate of Paradise and An Easter Dream, and a a

== Ancestry ==
Ancestors of Princess Marie of Battenberg

8. Louis I, Grand Duke of Hesse and by Rhine
4. Louis II, Grand Duke of Hesse and by Rhine
9. Princess Louise of Hesse-Darmstadt
2. Prince Alexander of Hesse and by Rhine
10. Charles Louis, Hereditary Prince of Baden
5. Princess Wilhelmine of Baden
11. Princess Amalie of Hesse-Darmstadt
1. Princess Marie of Battenberg
12. Friedrich Carl Emanuel Hauke
6. Count John Maurice Hauke
13. Maria Salomé Schweppenhäuser
3. Julia, Princess of Battenberg
14. Franz Leopold Lafontaine
7. Sophie Lafontaine
15. Maria Theresia Kornély
