= Hauke (surname) =

Hauke is a German language surname. It stems from the male given name Hugo – and may refer to:

- César Mange de Hauke (1900–1965), controversial French art dealer
- Franzisca Hauke (1989), German field hockey player
- Frieda Hauke (1890–1972), German politician
- Friedrich Karl Emanuel Hauke (1737–1810), Polish educational theorist
- Hans Moritz Hauke (1775–1830), Polish general
- Józef Hauke-Bosak (1834–1871), Polish general
- Max Hauke (1992), cross-country skier from Austria
- Thomas A. Hauke (1938), American attorney and retired politician
- Tobias Hauke (1987), German field hockey player
