= Prince Francis Joseph of Battenberg =

Bulgarian prince (1861–1924)

Prince Francis Joseph
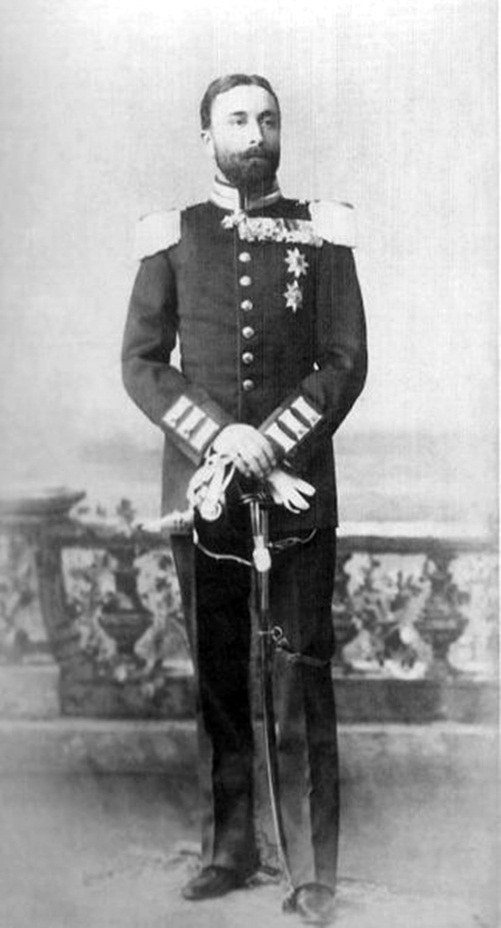
- Francis Joseph, circa 1900
- Born: 24 September 1861; Padua, Austrian Empire
- Died: 31 July 1924 (aged 62); Territet (near Montreux), Switzerland
- Spouse: Princess Anna of Montenegro (m. 1897)
- House: Battenberg
- Father: Prince Alexander of Hesse and by Rhine
- Mother: Julia, Princess of Battenberg

Prince Francis Joseph of Battenberg GCVO, KCB (German: Franz Joseph; 24 September 1861 – 31 July 1924) was the fourth and youngest son and child of Prince Alexander of Hesse and by Rhine and his morganatic wife Julia, Princess of Battenberg.

== Biography ==
Named after the Emperor of Austria, he was known as Franzjos to his parents and siblings. At one time, he was considered for the throne of Bulgaria, which eventually went to his brother Alexander; nonetheless, as Alexander was unmarried and without legitimate heirs at the time, Francis Joseph was considered heir presumptive to the throne. He followed his brother to Bulgaria, where he served as a colonel in the Bulgarian cavalry, seeing action during the Serbo-Bulgarian War. During the coup of 1886, he was arrested and expelled from Bulgaria, along with his brother. His cousin, and later sister-in-law, Victoria described him in her memoirs:

He was a delicate boy and was brought up on strictly ladylike lines by the governess of his sister, Adele Bassing. Our tomboy ways rather distressed him. He was very fond of reading and to prevent us from disturbing him too much, he suggested we should play Robinson Crusoe, he filling the part of Crusoe, Ella and I being two men Fridays, whom he incessantly sent away on important duties, while he remained in the improvised hut, reading in peace. He was good-natured, however, and I remember his helping us to search in the hay for a lost hair ribbon - a fruitless quest on his part, as he was very short sighted.

From an early age Francis Joseph showed great interest in science, and unlike his brothers – who pursued careers in the military – he pursued a career in academics; in 1891 he published an academic study on Bulgarian economic history, which he dedicated to his brother.

At a family reunion in London in 1894 Franz Joseph met Consuelo Vanderbilt, the daughter of an extremely wealthy American railway tycoon William Kissam Vanderbilt. He made a marriage proposal to Consuelo, but she disliked him and turned him down.

In 1897 he married Princess Ana Petrović-Njegoš of Montenegro (1874–1971), the sixth daughter of King Nicholas I of Montenegro; they had no children. He served as a colonel in the Montenegrin Army during the Balkan Wars.

They lived in Prinz Emil Palais, but upon the outbreak of World War I, he and his wife moved to Switzerland, where he lived until his death in 1924. He was a close friend of his brother-in-law King Victor Emmanuel III of Italy, whom he visited often; their wives were sisters.

== Honours ==
He received the following orders and decorations:

- Grand Duchy of Hesse:
  - Grand Cross of the Merit Order of Philip the Magnanimous, with Swords, 18 August 1878
  - Military Merit Cross, 27 November 1885
  - Grand Cross of the Ludwig Order, 17 November 1886
- Kingdom of Italy:
  - Knight of the Annunciation, 29 November 1904
  - Grand Cross of Saints Maurice and Lazarus
- Ottoman Empire: Order of Osmanieh, 1st Class in Diamonds
- Principality of Bulgaria:
  - Grand Cross of St. Alexander, with Swords and Collar
  - Order of Bravery, 4th Class
  - Officer of the Military Merit Order
  - Commemorative Medal for the Liberation of Bulgaria
  - Commemorative Medal for the Serbo-Bulgarian War, 1885
  - Distinguished Service Cross (10 years)
- Principality of Montenegro:
  - Grand Cross of the Order of Prince Danilo I
  - Knight of St. Peter of Cetinje
  - Medal for Bravery
- United Kingdom:
  - Queen Victoria Golden Jubilee Medal, 1887
  - Honorary Knight Commander of the Bath (civil), 6 February 1896
  - Honorary Knight Grand Cross of the Royal Victorian Order, 26 April 1897

== Ancestry ==
Ancestors of Prince Francis Joseph of Battenberg

8. Louis I, Grand Duke of Hesse and by Rhine
4. Louis II, Grand Duke of Hesse and by Rhine
9. Princess Louise of Hesse-Darmstadt
2. Prince Alexander of Hesse and by Rhine
10. Charles Louis, Hereditary Prince of Baden
5. Princess Wilhelmine of Baden
11. Princess Amalie of Hesse-Darmstadt
1. Prince Francis Joseph of Battenberg
12. Friedrich Karl Emanuel Hauke
6. Count John Maurice Hauke
13. Maria Salomé Schweppenhäuser
3. Julia, Princess of Battenberg
14. Franz Leopold Lafontaine
7. Sophie Lafontaine
15. Maria Theresia Kornély
