= Julia, Princess of Battenberg =

Russian and German noblewoman (1825–1895)

Julia
- Princess of Battenberg
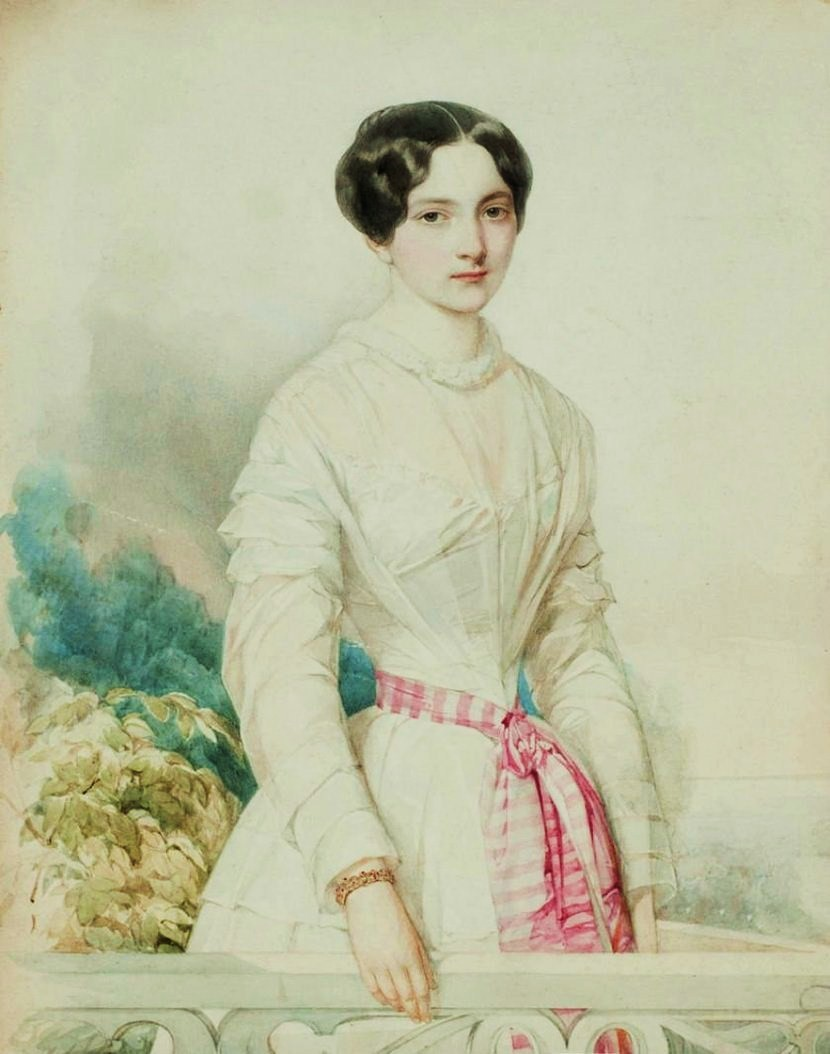
- Julia Hauke by Woldemar Hau
- Born: Julia Therese Salomea Hauke; 24 November 1825; Warsaw, Congress Poland, Russian Empire
- Died: 19 September 1895 (aged 69); Schloss Heiligenberg, Jugenheim, Grand Duchy of Hesse
- Spouse: Prince Alexander of Hesse and by Rhine (m. 1851; died 1888)
- Issue: Marie, Princess of Erbach-Schönberg; Louis Mountbatten, 1st Marquess of Milford Haven; Alexander, Prince of Bulgaria; Prince Henry; Prince Francis Joseph
- House: Battenberg
- Father: Hans Moritz Hauke
- Mother: Sophie LaFontaine

Julia, Princess of Battenberg, previously Countess Julia von Hauke and Countess of Battenberg (born Julia Therese Salomea Hauke; 24 November [O.S. 12 November] 1825 – 19 September 1895), was the wife of Prince Alexander of Hesse and by Rhine, the third son of Louis II, Grand Duke of Hesse.

The daughter of a Polish general of German descent, Julia was not of royal origin. She became a lady-in-waiting to Marie of Hesse, wife of the future Russian Emperor Alexander II and a sister of Alexander, whom Julia married after meeting him in the course of her duties. Although the marriage of social unequals like Julia and Alexander was deemed morganatic, the Duke of Hesse made her Princess of Battenberg. Julia was the mother of Alexander, Prince of Bulgaria, and she is an ancestor of the current British and Spanish royal families.

== Life ==
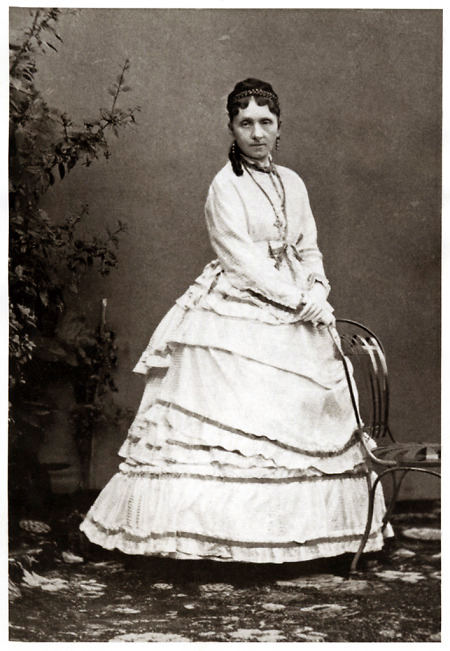
Julia in middle age

Hauke was born in Warsaw, Congress Poland, then ruled in personal union by the Russian emperor. She was the daughter of Hans Moritz von Hauke, a Polish general of German descent. Her mother, Sophie, was the daughter of Polish military surgeon of French descent, Franz Leopold Lafontaine.

Her father fought in Napoleon's Polish Legions in Austria, Italy, Germany, and the Peninsular War. After his service in the army of the Duchy of Warsaw from 1809 to 1814, he entered the ranks of the army of Congress Poland, and was promoted to general in 1828. Recognizing his abilities, Emperor Nicholas I appointed him Deputy Minister of War of Congress Poland and on 4 May 1829 made him a hereditary Count von Hauke. In the November Uprising of 1830, led by rebelling army cadets, Grand Duke Konstantin Pavlovich, Poland's Russian governor, managed to escape, but Julia's father was shot dead by the cadets on a Warsaw street. Her mother died of shock shortly afterwards, and their children were made wards of the Emperor.

Hauke served as lady-in-waiting to Marie of Hesse, wife of the future Emperor Alexander II and a sister of Prince Alexander of Hesse and by Rhine. She met Prince Alexander while performing her duties at court in Saint Petersburg. The Emperor did not approve of a courtship between her and his son's brother-in-law, so the two arranged to leave Saint Petersburg. By the time Julia and Alexander were able to marry, she was six months pregnant with their first child, Marie. They were married on 28 October 1851 in Breslau in Prussian Silesia (now called Wrocław and in Poland).

Since she was not considered equal for royal marriage purposes, her children did not qualify for succession to the throne of Hesse and by Rhine. Her marriage was declared to be morganatic after the birth of her first son. Her husband's brother, Grand Duke Louis III of Hesse-Darmstadt, made her Countess of Battenberg in 1851, with the style of Illustrious Highness (German: Erlaucht). In 1858, she was elevated to Princess of Battenberg, with the style of Serene Highness (German: Durchlaucht). Battenberg became the name of a morganatic branch of the Grand Ducal House of Hesse.

Hauke converted to Lutheranism on 12 May 1875. Prior to her conversion, she frequently visited Orthodox and Byzantine Catholic churches throughout Hesse, often traveling great distances. Her religion was openly criticized by members of her husband's family until her conversion. Her children were baptized Lutheran. She died at Heiligenberg Castle on 19 September 1895.

== Children ==
There were five children of the marriage, all princes and princesses of Battenberg:

- Princess Marie of Battenberg (1852–1923), married Gustav, Prince of Erbach-Schönberg (d. 1908) in 1871, and had issue.
- Prince Louis of Battenberg (1854–1921), married Princess Victoria of Hesse and by Rhine (1863–1950) in 1884, and had issue (including Queen Louise of Sweden and Louis Mountbatten, 1st Earl Mountbatten of Burma). In 1917, Louis and his descendants gave up their German titles and took the surname Mountbatten; Louis was later created the first Marquess of Milford Haven. Via his daughter Alice, whose only son, Prince Philip, Duke of Edinburgh, married Queen Elizabeth II, Louis is an ancestor of the current British royal family.
- Prince Alexander of Battenberg (1857–1893), known as Sandro, elected Prince of Bulgaria 1879 and abdicated in 1886, married morganatically Johanna Loisinger (1865–1951) in 1889, and had issue.
- Prince Henry of Battenberg (1858–1896), known as Liko, married Princess Beatrice of the United Kingdom (1857–1944) in 1885, and had issue (including Queen Victoria Eugenia of Spain, via whom he is an ancestor of the current Spanish royal family). In 1917, Henry's descendants gave up their German titles and took the surname Mountbatten; his eldest son, Alexander, was later created the first Marquess of Carisbrooke.
- Prince Francis Joseph of Battenberg (1861–1924), known as Franzjos, married Princess Anna of Montenegro (1874–1971) in 1897, and had no issue.

=== Descendants change name to Mountbatten ===
Arms of Battenberg: Argent, two pallets sable, as granted to Countess Julia Hauke, created "Princess of Battenberg", by the Grand Duke of Hesse

Julia's eldest son, Louis, became a British subject, and during World War I, due to anti-German sentiment prevalent at the time, anglicised his name to Mountbatten (a literal translation of the German Battenberg), as did his nephews, the surviving sons of Prince Henry and Princess Beatrice. The members of this branch of the family also renounced all German titles and were granted peerages by their cousin King George V: Prince Louis became the 1st Marquess of Milford Haven, while Prince Alexander, Prince Henry's eldest son, became the 1st Marquess of Carisbrooke.

== Legacy ==
Her daughter-in-law, Princess Victoria, described her in her memoirs:

My father-in-law and she always spoke French together and she always spoke French to all her children and to me. She was the kindest and most discreet of mothers-in-law, which became very noticeable after the death of Uncle Alexander, when she spent the summer with us at the Heiligenberg, when she was no more the mistress of the place. She was a very affectionate grandmother especially to Alice, who adored her.

In a biography of her great-grandson Prince Philip, the Duke of Edinburgh, it was noted that some British courtiers regarded him as not entirely royal because of his Battenberg (Mountbatten) ancestry. Julia was described as "a blot on the Battenberg escutcheon" and even Heinrich Himmler later characterised the Battenberg family as "somewhat peculiar" reflecting perceptions of their history of unconventional marriages.

== Honours ==
- Grand Duchy of Hesse:
  - Military Medical Cross, 26 March 1871
  - Commemorative Medal for the French Campaign in 1870/71 (for non-combatants)
  - Dame of the Grand Ducal Hessian Order of the Golden Lion, 1 January 1883
- Kingdom of Bavaria:
  - Dame of Honour of the Order of Theresa
  - Cross of Merit, 1st Class for 1870/71
- Russian Empire:
  - Dame Grand Cross of the Imperial Order of Saint Catherine
  - Red Cross Medal, 1st Class

== Ancestry ==
Ancestors of Julia, Princess of Battenberg

8. Ignatz Marianus Hauck
4. Friedrich Carl Emanuel Hauke
9. Maria Franziska Riedesel zu Eisenbach
2. Hans Moritz Hauke
10. Heinrich Wilhelm Schweppenhäuser
5. Maria Salomé Schweppenhäuser
11. Charlotte Philippine Juliane Westermann
1. Julia, Princess of Battenberg
12. Benno Leopold Ignatius Lafontaine
6. Franz Leopold Lafontaine
13. Maria Katharina Franziska Leonhardt
3. Sophie Lafontaine
14. Joseph Kornély
7. Maria Theresia Kornély

== See also ==
- Hauke-Bosak

== Other sources ==
- Almanach de Gotha, Gotha, 1931.
- Eckhart G. Franz, Das Haus Hessen: Eine europäische Familie, Kohlhammer Verlag, Stuttgart 2005 (S. 164–170), ISBN 3-17-018919-0
