= Hauke-Bosak =

Noble family of German origin

Hauke-Bosak Hauck
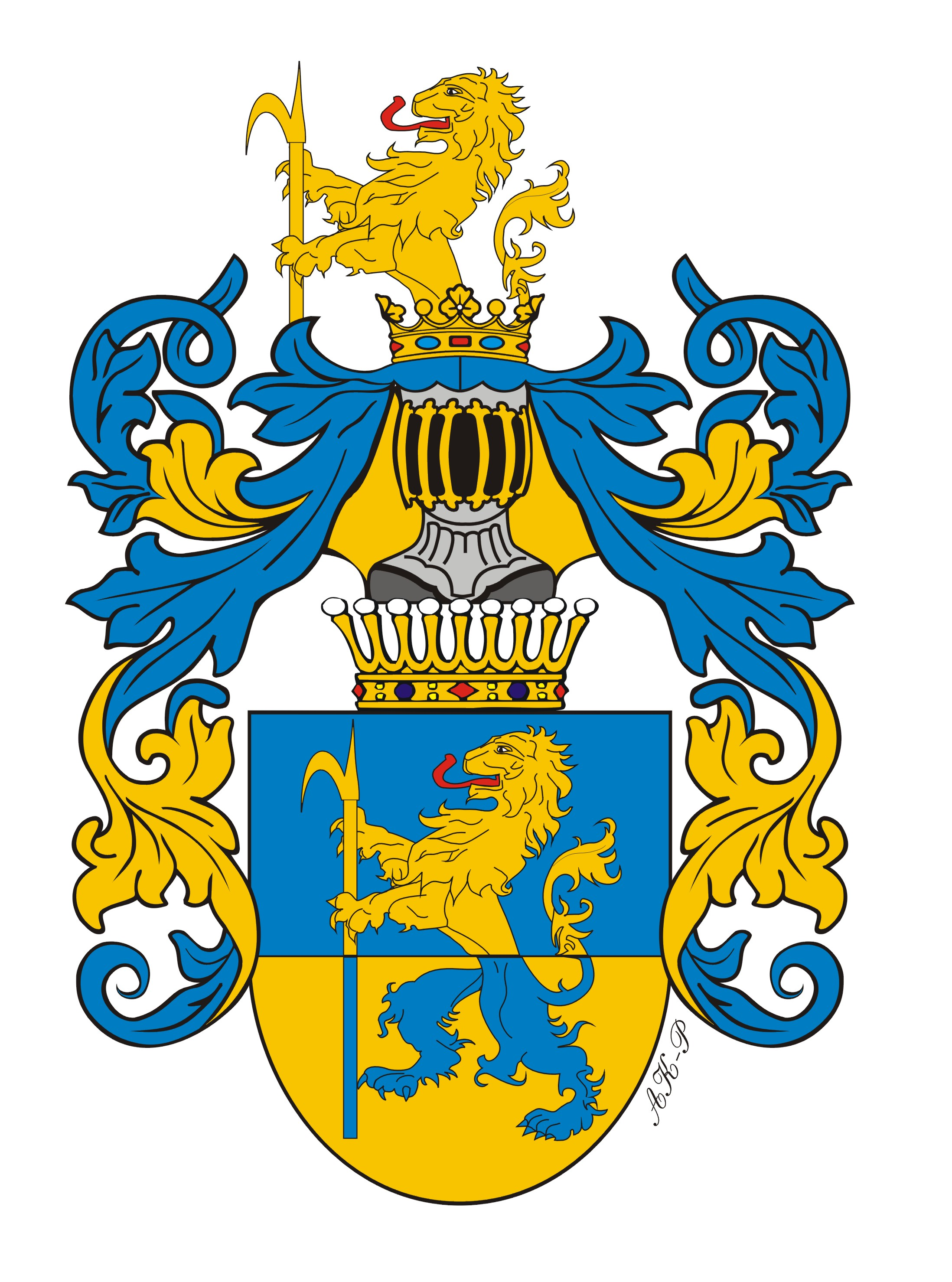
- Coat of arms of the Haukes, called "Bosak" (Grappling hook) and awarded in 1826, the coronet added in 1829
- Country: Germany; Poland; Austria; Russia
- Origin: Wetzlar, Hesse, Germany
- Founded: 17th century
- Founder: Johann Gaspar Hauck
- Styles: Count von Hauke; Countess of Battenberg; Princess of Battenberg
- Connected families: Riedesel zu Eisenbach; Battenberg; Mountbatten
- Traditions: Catholicism, Lutheranism, Calvinism

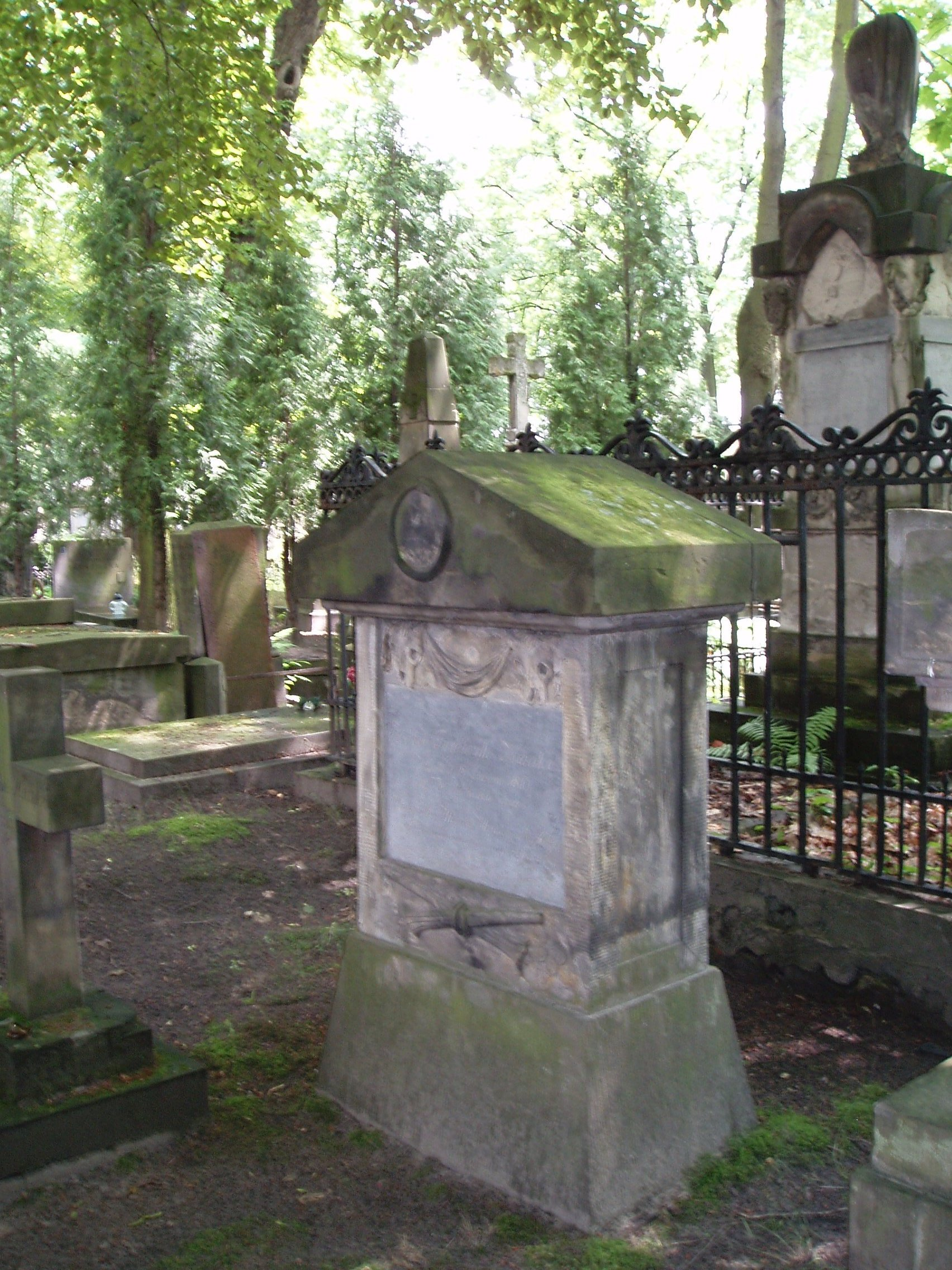
The grave of Fryderyk Karol Emanuel Hauke (Powązki, Warsaw)

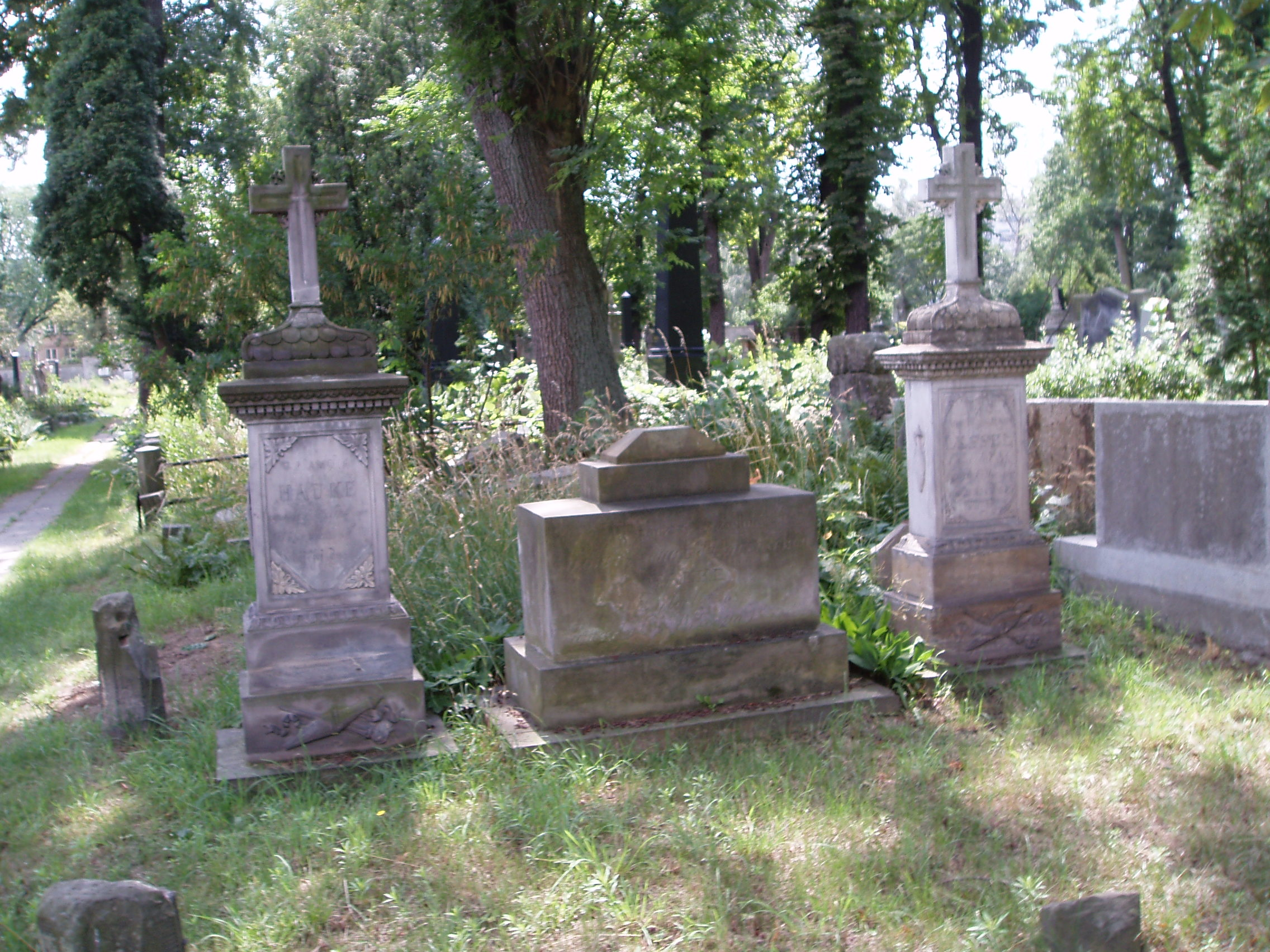
The grave of Maria Hauke (Protestant Cemetery, Warsaw)

The Hauke-Bosak family (more commonly called Hauke) is a German-Polish noble family. Originally a German middle class family, they settled in Poland at the end of the 18th century and achieved great importance and titles of nobility in the Kingdom of Poland, the Russian Empire, the Austrian Empire, and the Grand Duchy of Hesse.

== History ==
The first known ancestor of the Hauke family was Johann Gaspar Hauck, a registrar at the Imperial Chamber Court of the Holy Roman Empire in Wetzlar, who died in 1722 and was buried in his home town. By his wife Johanna Barbara Mederacke, he had ten children, of whom two sons, Johann Valentin (1698–1722) and Ignatz Marianus (1706–1784), came to important positions: Johann continued the family tradition of employment at the Court of Justice in Wetzlar, while Ignatz became a secretary to the Government of the Electorate of Mainz.

Ignatz, too, had many children, nine, with his wife Maria Franziska Riedesel zu Eisenbach (1717–1785), who was an illegitimate (later acknowledged) daughter of Baron Georg XX Riedesel zu Eisenbach (1690–1737), a member of one of the oldest Hessian noble families. One of their sons, Johann Friedrich Michael Hauck (born 1737 in Mainz, died 1810 in Warsaw) moved to Saxony and later to Poland as a secretary of the powerful Count Alois Friedrich von Brühl, Starost of Warsaw, General of the Royal Polish Artillery and son of Heinrich von Brühl, the famous Saxon-Polish minister.

In 1782, Count Alois von Brühl sold his Polish dignities and estates and returned to Saxony, but Johann Friedrich stayed in Warsaw with his family of seven children by an Alsatian Protestant preacher's daughter, Maria Salomé Schweppenhäuser (1755–1833). Having changed his Christian names to the more Polish sounding Fryderyk Karol Emanuel and his surname to Hauke, Fryderyk Karol Emanuel Hauke had considerable success as owner of a private school and later as teacher of the German language and mathematics at an exclusive Prussian school for boys, called Warsaw Lycaeum.

Three of Fryderyk Karol Emanuel Hauke's sons, John Maurice, Ludwik August (1779–1851) and Joseph (1790–1837), entered after 1815 the service of the Czar, who was at the same time King of Congress Poland, achieved very high positions and received titles and rights of Polish nobility in 1826. The coat of arms awarded to them received in accordance to the Polish custom of naming arms the name "Bosak" (Grappling hook), which one member of the family, Joseph, later used as a pseudonym. John Maurice (in 1829) and Joseph (in 1830), both of them Generals, were elevated to the rank of counts of the Russian Empire. In 1861, the branch of Ludwik August followed, having obtained an Austrian confirmation of the title of Count awarded to General Alexander Hauke (1814–1868), who married his cousin Sophie (1816–1861), a daughter of Count John Maurice and sister to Countess Julia and Countess Catharina, mistress of Grand Duke Paul Frederick of Mecklenburg-Schwerin.

In 1851, Julia, who had been serving as a lady-in-waiting to Princess Wilhelmine Marie of Hesse and by Rhine, married the princess's brother, Prince Alexander of Hesse and by Rhine. The marriage was deemed morganatic, as Julia was not of royal lineage, and her children were disqualified from the line of succession to the throne of the Grand Duchy of Hesse. The year of her marriage, Julia's brother-in-law, Louis III, Grand Duke of Hesse, made her the Countess of Battenberg in her own right with the style of Illustrious Highness. In 1858, she was elevated to the style of Serene Highness with the title Princess of Battenberg, in her own right. Her children became members of the House of Battenberg, a morganatic branch of the House of Hesse-Darmstadt.

The branches of John Maurice and Joseph became extinct in male line in 1852 respectively in 1949, the branch of Ludwik and Alexander still flourishes. Its descendants all live in Stockholm except one, who is a Dominican prior in Poznań. They left Poland and settled in Sweden about 1960, aided by their relative, Queen Louise of Sweden.

Most of the Haukes living in Warsaw in the first half of the 19th century are buried at the Catholic Powązki Cemetery in Warsaw, those who were Lutherans or Calvinists (mostly Protestant women who married into the family) repose at the Lutheran and Calvinist Cemeteries of the Polish capital. Solely John Maurice and his wife lie in the crypt of the Capucin church in Warsaw's Old Town.

== Notable members ==
- Friedrich Karl Emanuel Hauke (1737–1810), German academic and educator
- Maria Salomé Schweppenhäuser Hauke (1755–1833), German court chambermaid and wife of Friedrich
- Count John Maurice von Hauke (1775–1830), Polish general
- Julia von Hauke, Princess of Battenberg (1825–1895), Polish courtier
- Count Józef Hauke-Bosak (1834–1871), Polish general
- César Mange de Hauke (1900–1965), French art dealer

== Sources ==
- Stanisław Łoza, Rodziny polskie pochodzenia cudzoziemskiego zamieszkale w Warszawie i okolicach, vol. 2, Warsaw 1934
- Baron Constantin Stackelberg, Genealogy of the Hauke Family, Washington D.C. 1955
- Information from Count Zygmunt de Hauke, Stockholm
