= Prince Alexander of Battenberg =

Prince Alexander of Battenberg may refer to:

- Alexander of Battenberg (1857–1893), first prince of modern Bulgaria
- Alexander Mountbatten, 1st Marquess of Carisbrooke (1886–1960), Prince Alexander of Battenberg

== See also ==
- Battenberg family
