= Battenberg family =

Former German noble family from Hesse

Battenberg
- Coat of arms
- Parent house: Hesse-Darmstadt branch of the House of Hesse
- Origin: Grand Duchy of Hesse
- Members: Princess Julia of Battenberg, Princess Marie of Battenberg, Prince Louis of Battenberg
- Connected members: Princess Andrew of Greece and Denmark, Princess Louise of Battenberg, Prince George of Battenberg
- Connected families: House of Windsor
- Cadet branches: Mountbatten family

Original arms of Battenberg family

The House of Battenberg is a non-dynastic cadet branch of the House of Hesse-Darmstadt, which ruled the Grand Duchy of Hesse until 1918. The first member was Countess Julia von Hauke, whose brother-in-law Grand Duke Louis III of Hesse created her Countess of Battenberg in 1851, along with the style of Illustrious Highness (H.Ill.H.), at the time of her morganatic marriage to Grand Duke Louis's brother Prince Alexander of Hesse and by Rhine. The name of the title refers to the town of Battenberg in Hesse. In 1858, the countess' title was elevated to Princess of Battenberg, with the style of Serene Highness (H.S.H.).

In 1917, most members of the family had been residing in the British Empire and had renounced their Hessian titles, due to rising anti-German sentiment among the British during the First World War. At that point, they changed the family name to Mountbatten, an anglicised version of Battenberg. However, Juan, Count of Barcelona, a son of Victoria Eugenie of Battenberg, Queen of Spain, bore the surname of Borbón y Battenberg until his death in 1993.

The last born member of the House of Battenberg who had not changed the name was the youngest son of the Princess of Battenberg, Prince Francis Joseph of Battenberg, who died childless in 1924, but his widow, Princess Anna of Battenberg also kept using the name of Battenberg until the end of her life.

== Origins ==
Prince Alexander (1823–1888) was the third son of Grand Duke Louis II of Hesse and by Rhine and of Wilhelmina of Baden, yet it was openly rumoured that his biological father was actually Baron Augustus von Senarclens-Grancy, his mother's chamberlain.

Prince Alexander's spouse, Julia von Hauke (1825–1895), was a mere countess, the orphaned daughter of Count Moritz von Hauke, a Polish nobleman who had served as a general in the Imperial Russian Army and then as Deputy Minister of War of Congress Poland.

Count von Hauke's rank was too low for his daughter's children with Prince Alexander to qualify for the succession to the throne of the Grand Duchy of Hesse. For this reason, her new brother-in-law Louis III of Hesse created the title of Countess of Battenberg (German: Gräfin von Battenberg) for her and for the couple's descendants.

In 1858, the title, which referred to the town of Battenberg in Hesse, was elevated to princely status. There was never a corresponding principality of Battenberg; the title was a non-sovereign one in the nobility of the Grand Duchy of Hesse.

A previous family of the counts of Battenberg had become extinct in the 14th century.

After 1858, the children of this union bore the title of Prince (German: Prinz) or Princess (German: Prinzessin), with the style of Serene Highness (German: Durchlaucht). Battenberg thus became the name of a morganatic cadet branch of the Grand Ducal family of Hesse, without the right of succession to the Grand Duchy.

== Members ==
- Julia, Princess of Battenberg (1825–1895), married Prince Alexander of Hesse and by Rhine, third son of Louis II, Grand Duke of Hesse, and Wilhelmina of Baden
  - Princess Marie of Battenberg (1852–1923), married the Prince of Erbach-Schönberg in 1871
  - Prince Louis of Battenberg (1854–1921), renounced his title in 1917 and was created Marquess of Milford Haven — he married his first cousin once removed Princess Victoria of Hesse and by Rhine, daughter of Louis IV, Grand Duke of Hesse, and Princess Alice of the United Kingdom
    - Princess Alice of Battenberg (1885–1969), married Prince Andrew of Greece and Denmark in 1903, issuing Prince Philip, Duke of Edinburgh
    - Princess Louise of Battenberg (1889–1965), renounced her title in 1917 and became Lady Louise Mountbatten, she married the future Gustaf VI Adolf of Sweden in 1923
    - Prince George of Battenberg (1892–1938), renounced his title in 1917 and took on his father's junior title of Earl of Medina, later becoming second Marquess of Milford Haven
    - Prince Louis of Battenberg (1900–1979), renounced his title in 1917 and became Lord Louis Mountbatten (later created Earl Mountbatten of Burma)
  - Prince Alexander of Battenberg (1857–1893), in 1879 was elected as the ruling Prince of Bulgaria, later Count of Hartenau after his abdication.
    - Count Assen of Hartenau (1890–1965), married Bertha Hussa-Lamos (1892–1971), no issue
    - Countess Tsvetana of Hartenau (1893–1935), married Charles Hercules Boissevain (1893-1946)
  - Prince Henry of Battenberg (1858–1896) — married Princess Beatrice of the United Kingdom, a younger daughter of Queen Victoria and Prince Albert
    - Prince Alexander of Battenberg (1886–1960), renounced his title in 1917 and was created Marquess of Carisbrooke
    - Princess Victoria Eugenie of Battenberg (1887–1969), married Alfonso XIII of Spain in 1906
    - Prince Leopold of Battenberg (1889–1922), renounced his title in 1917 and became Lord Leopold Mountbatten
    - Prince Maurice of Battenberg (1891–1914)
  - Prince Francis Joseph of Battenberg (1861–1924), married Princess Anna of Montenegro

== Connections to royal families ==
One of the original couple's sons, Prince Alexander of Battenberg, was made Sovereign Prince of Bulgaria in 1879. However, he was forced to abdicate in 1886.

Another son, Prince Henry of Battenberg, married Princess Beatrice, the youngest daughter of Queen Victoria. Their daughter, Victoria Eugenia Julia Ena, became queen consort of Spain. Her uncle Edward VII elevated her style to Royal Highness, so that she would have the necessary status to marry into the Spanish royal family.

Alexander and Julia's eldest son, Prince Louis of Battenberg, became the First Sea Lord of the Royal Navy. Due to anti-German feelings prevalent in Britain during the First World War, he anglicised his name to Mountbatten, as did his children and nephews, the sons of Prince Henry and Princess Beatrice.

One of the couple's four sons and one of their grandsons renounced their Hessian titles and were granted peerages by their cousin, George V – Prince Louis became the first Marquess of Milford Haven, while Prince Alexander, Prince Henry's eldest son, was created Marquess of Carisbrooke.

Prince Louis's second daughter, Princess Louise of Battenberg, married the future Gustaf VI Adolf of Sweden in 1923 and became Queen Consort of Sweden in 1950. His younger son, Louis Mountbatten, 1st Earl Mountbatten of Burma, became the last Viceroy of India. Prince Louis's elder daughter, Princess Alice of Battenberg, married Prince Andrew of Greece and Denmark; their son, Prince Philip of Greece and Denmark (later styled as Prince Philip, Duke of Edinburgh), married the heir presumptive to the British throne, later Elizabeth II, after having renounced his Greek titles and taken his maternal grandfather's and uncle's surname of Mountbatten. The name Battenberg, in its anglicised form, is now a part of the personal surname (Mountbatten-Windsor) of some members of the British royal family.

In 1897, Prince Francis Joseph of Battenberg married Princess Anna of Montenegro, a sister of Queen Elena of Italy and a maternal aunt of Alexander I of Yugoslavia.

== Coats of arms ==
In addition to the arms shown above:

Coat of arms of Queen Louise of Sweden

Coat of arms of Prince Louis, 1st Marquess of Milford Haven

Coat of arms of Prince Henry of Battenberg

Coat of arms of Princes Alexander, Leopold and Maurice of Battenberg (before 1917)

Coat of arms of Princess Victoria Eugenie of Battenberg (before 1906)

Coat of arms of Princess Victoria Eugenie of Battenberg (1906)

Coat of arms of Victoria Eugenie of Battenberg as Queen Consort of Spain
Arms of Alexander of Battenberg, who ruled the Principality of Bulgaria (1879–1886)

Arms of Prince Louis, 1st Marquess of Milford Haven, and Prince Henry of Battenberg

Arms of Princes Alexander, Leopold and Maurice of Battenberg (before 1917)

Arms of Princess Victoria Eugenie of Battenberg (before 1906)

Arms of Princess Victoria Eugenie of Battenberg (1906) before marriage to Alfonso XIII of Spain

== Family tree ==
Genealogical Table of the Battenberg, Mountbatten and Mountbatten Windsor Family

Battenberg/ Mountbatten	House of Hesse-Darmstadt	British Royal Family	House of Romanov (Russia)	Greek Royal Family	Swedish Royal Family	Spanish Royal Family
Louis II (1777–1848); Grand Duke of Hesse and by the Rhine; 1830—1848
Victoria	Prince Albert of Saxe-Coburg and Gotha	Prince Charles of Hesse and by the Rhine (1809–1877)	Louis III (1806–1877); Grand Duke of Hesse and by the Rhine; 1848—1877	Prince Alexander of Hesse and by the Rhine (1823–1888)	Julia v. Hauke (Note: This coat of arms is reported in the "Heraldry of the Royal Families of Europe", by Jiri Louda and Michael Maclagan, Clarkson N. Potter, Inc. Publishers, New York, 1981, p216, table 109. While these arms are virtually the same as the city of Mainz, it is a common heraldic law that identical arms are allowed when the bearers are of different nations, but within a nation they are not (see for England, Warbelton v Gorges and Scrope v Grosvenor). However, Wikipedia reports a different set of arms for the family at the article on Hauke-Bosak (However, these arms are for the family in Russia, and the reference given is an expired page in the Polish Wikipedia. There is no reference for the family seen in the Rietstap Armorial General.) (1825–1895); Countess, later Princess of Battenberg	Marie (1824–1880); Empress Maria Alexandrovna	Alexander II (1818–1881); Emperor of All Russia; 1855—1881
Edward VII	Alice (1843–1878); Grand Duchess of Hesse and by the Rhine	Louis IV (1837–1892); Grand Duke of Hesse and by the Rhine; 1877—1892	Princess Beatrice of the United Kingdom (1857–1944)	Prince Henry of Battenberg (1858–1896)	Prince Alexander of Battenberg (1857–1893); Prince of Bulgaria (1879–1886)	Prince Francis Joseph of Battenberg (1861–1924)	Alexander III (1845–1894); Emperor of All Russia; 1881—1894	George I (1845–1913); King of Greece; 1863—1913
George V	Ernest Louis (1868–1937); Grand Duke of Hesse and by the Rhine; 1892—1918	Alix (1872–1918); Empress of Russia	Nicholas II (1868–1918); Emperor of All Russia; 1894—1917	Victoria (1863–1950)	Prince Louis of Battenberg (Note: Admiral of the Fleet, RN GCB, GCVO, KCMG, PC First Sea Lord, RN (1912–1914)) (1854–1921) from 1917 Louis Mountbatten, 1st Marquess of Milford Haven	Alexander (1886–1960) from 1917 Alexander Mountbatten, Marquess of Carisbrooke	Leopold (1889–1922) from 1917 Lord Leopold Mountbatten	Prince Maurice of Battenberg (1891–1914)	Victoria Eugenie of Battenberg (1887–1969) Queen of Spain,1906 –1931	Alfonso XIII (1886–1941); King of Spain; 1886—1931	Constantine I (1868–1923); King of Greece; 1913-17 & 1920-22
George VI	Georg Donatus, Hereditary Grand Duke of Hesse (1906–1937)	Louis, Prince of Hesse and by Rhine (1908–1968)	Princess Alice of Battenberg (1885–1969)	Prince Andrew of Greece and Denmark (1882–1944)	Louise Mountbatten (1889–1965); Queen of Sweden	Gustaf VI Adolf (1882–1973); King of Sweden; 1950—1973	George (1892–1938) 2nd Marquess of Milford Haven	Lord Louis Mountbatten (Note: Admiral of the Fleet, RN KG GCB OM GCSI GCIE GCVO DSO PC FRS Chief of Combined Operations, Chiefs of Staff Committee (UK) and Combined Chiefs of Staff (US & UK) (1941–1943) Supreme Allied Commander, South East Asia Command(1943–1946) Viceroy and Governor-General of India(1947) Governor-General of India(1947–1948) Commander-in-Chief, Mediterranean Fleet, RN (1952–1954) Fourth Sea Lord, RN (1950–1952) First Sea Lord, RN (1955–1959) Chief of the Defence Staff (1959–1965)) (1900–1979) 1st Earl Mountbatten of Burma	Infante Juan; Count of Barcelona (1913–1993)	Paul (1901–1964); King of Greece; 1947—1964
Elizabeth II (1926–2022)	Philip (Note: Prince Philip was born a member of the Danish and Greek Royal House of Glucksborg and was known as Prince Philip of Greece and Denmark. On his marriage he became a naturalized British subject, disclaimed his Greek and Danish titles, and adopted his mother's maiden name of Mountbatten as his surname. As documented in the Mountbatten family and Mountbatten-Windsor articles, the dynastic name of the British Royal Family remains Windsor. However, the personal surname of Queen Elizabeth II and Prince Philip's male-line descendants who do not carry royal titles is Mountbatten-Windsor (e.g. James Mountbatten-Windsor, Earl of Wessex and Lady Louise Mountbatten-Windsor). Philip was created Duke of Edinburgh on his marriage. In 1957, Queen Elizabeth created him a British Prince.) (1921–2021); Duke of Edinburgh	Prince; Gustaf Adolf; Duke of Västerbotten (1906—1947)	David Mountbatten (1919–1970); 3rd Marquess of Milford Haven	Lady Pamela Hicks (1929–2026)	Patricia Knatchbull (1924–2017); 2nd Countess Mountbatten of Burma m. John Knatchbull, 7th Baron Brabourne	Juan Carlos I (1938—); King of Spain; 1975—2014	Sophia (1938—); Queen of Spain; 1975—2014	Constantine II (1940—2023); King of Greece; 1964–73
Charles III (1948–)	Anne, Princess Royal (1950–)	Andrew Mountbatten-Windsor (1960–)	Prince Edward, Duke of Edinburgh (1964–)	Carl XVI Gustaf (1946–); King of Sweden; 1973—	George Mountbatten (1961–); 4th Marquess of Milford Haven	Lord Ivar Mountbatten (1963–)	Norton Knatchbull (1947–); 3rd Earl Mountbatten of Burma	7 others	Felipe VI (1968–); King of Spain; 2014—	Pavlos; Crown Prince (1967—)

== Notes ==
Battenberg family House of Battenberg Cadet branch of the House of Hesse-Darmstadt
Preceded by House of Shishman	Ruling House of Bulgaria; 1879–1886	Succeeded by House of Saxe-Coburg and Gotha
