= César Mange de Hauke =

Art dealer and historian

- Born: 8 March 1900
- Died: 15 June 1965 (aged 65)
- Education: St Ronan's School
- Occupation: art dealer
- Parent(s): Francis Mange; Countess Marie von Hauke

César Mange de Hauke (8 March 1900 – 15 June 1965) was a French art dealer. His name has also been spelled de Haucke and de Hawke.

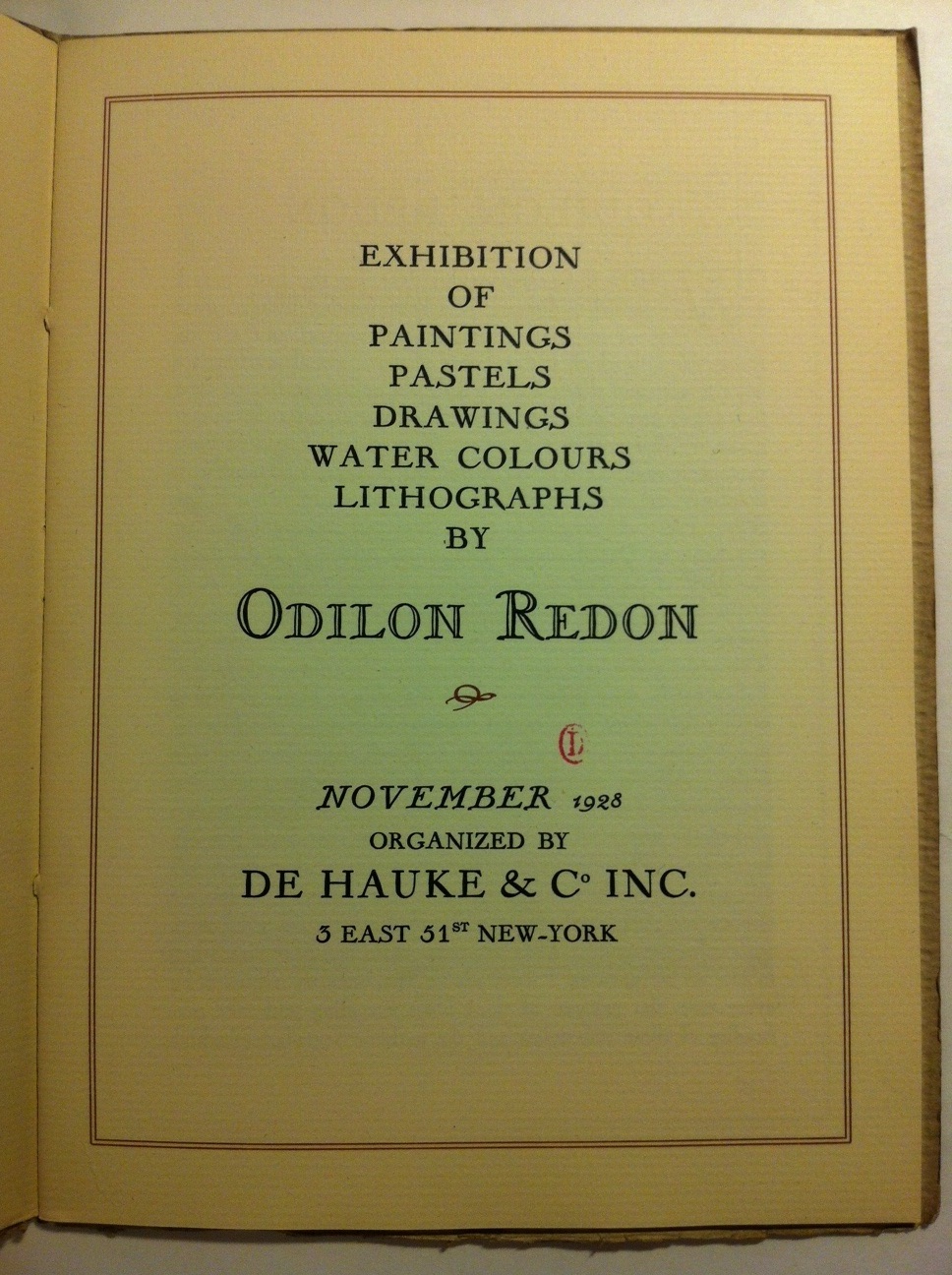
"Exhibition of paintings, pastels, drawings... by Odilon Redon, november 1928, organized by De Hauke & Co. Inc.", New York, De Hauke & Co. Inc., 1928

== Early life ==
Son of a Franco-Swiss engineer, Francis Mange (1856–1931), director of works for the Panama Canal in the 1890s, and of a mother of Polish origin born in Florence, Countess Marie von Hauke (1864–1942), César Mange de Hauke was sent very young to an English school, St. Ronan's School, in Hawkhurst, Kent, from 1911 to 1913.

Later, to train himself in art, he attended the Drawing Room of the British Museum, an institution to which he bequeathed, after his death, sixteen pieces from his collection of graphic arts.

Back in France, he got closer to artistic circles, in particular decorators. He was close to Paul Poiret's sister, Nicole Groult. He is interested in the work of Jean Dunand, Pierre-Émile Legrain, André Mare, Maurice Marinot, Jacques-Émile Ruhlmann.

== Art dealing partnerships ==
In 1926 he arrived in the USA worked for Jacques Seligmann & Co., Inc., as a sales representative. Seligmann financed a subsidiary company for him, initially called International Contemporary Art Company, Inc and later changed to Hauke & Co., Inc. Hauke was the director. The company sold mainly in the United States artworks that were acquired in Paris and London. In 1930 De Hauke & Co., Inc., became Modern Paintings, Inc, and in 1931 De Hauke resigned and returned to Paris.

The gallery De Hauke & Co. became known to the American public, through its exhibitions, Pierre Bonnard (1928), Jacques Mauny (1930), Modigliani (1929), Odilon Redon (1928), Ker-Xavier Roussel, Edouard Vuillard, the movement cubist (1930). The works were sometimes acquired in association with other dealers, such as Roland Balaÿ, Étienne Bignou, Paul Brame, Valentine Dudensing, Knoedler, Pierre Matisse, Alex Reid & Lefèvre, etc.

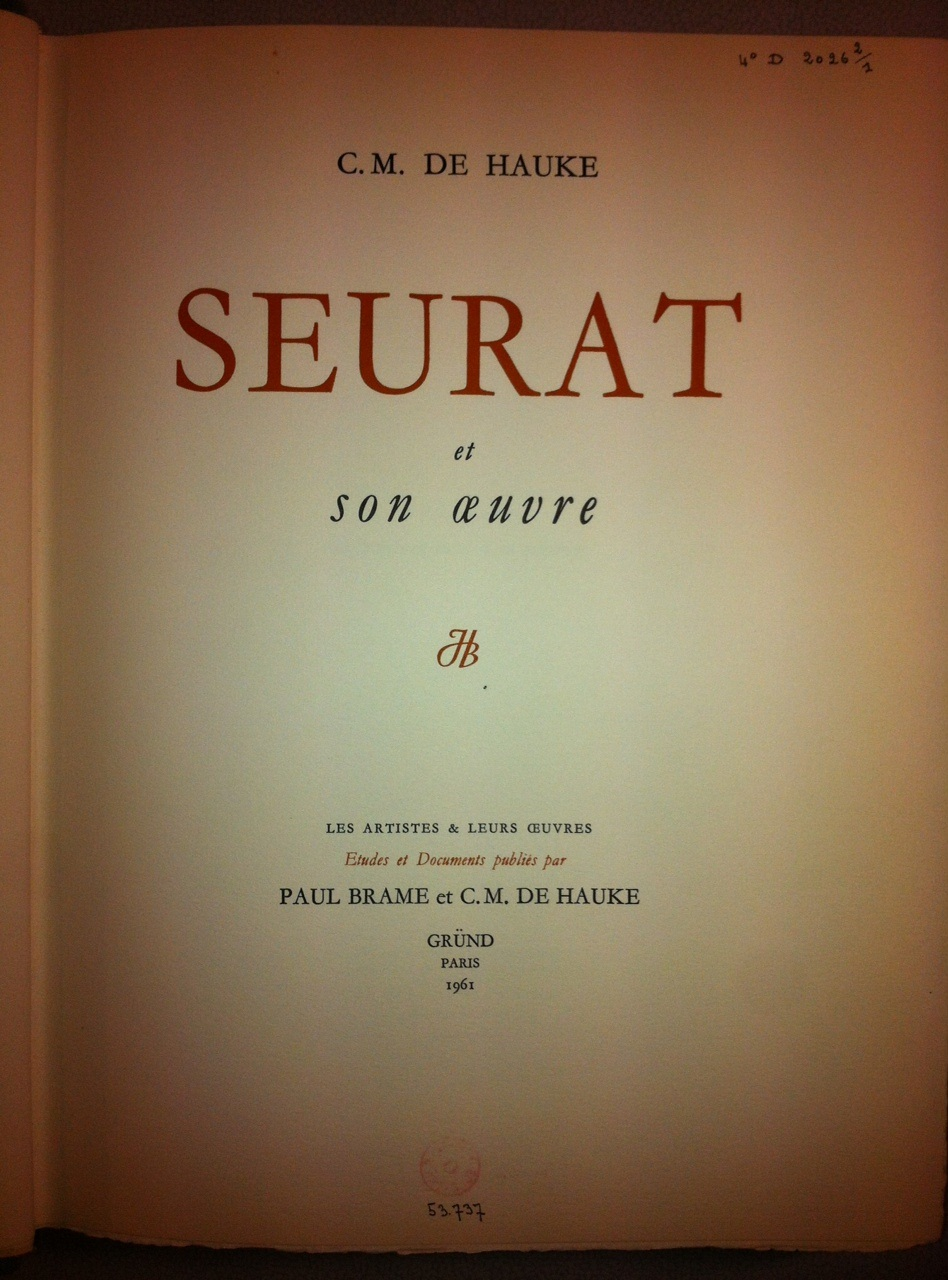
C. M. de Hauke, "Seurat et son œuvre", Paris, Gründ, 1961

In 1941 de Hauke established a partnership with Paul Brame.

== Nazi-looted art ==
De Hauke's name appears among the dealers reported by the OSS Art Looting Investigation Unit in 1946 for suspected involvement in Nazi-looted art.

De Hauke's name appears in several artworks with provenance gaps between 1933–1945, including in the UK Collections Trust Spoliation Reports. The name of his partner, Paul Brame appears in the French MNR as well as other provenance research projects.

According to Harvard Magazine, Hubertus Czernin, writing in the Viennese newspaper Der Standard of February 28, described him as a "collaborator of art plunderers".

Investigated after the war, de Hauke was placed on a list of persons to be barred from entry to the United States. However a misspelling of his name enabled him to obtain the necessary papers.

== Postwar activity ==
According to art historian Jonathan Petropoulos, de Hauke was friends with the Monuments Man officer Tom Howe and maintained a warm correspondence with him after World War II.

De Hauke was the author of the complete catalogue of Georges Seurat, published in 1961. He gave his collection of French drawings to the British Museum.

== Family ==
Mange de Hauke had a younger brother, Roland (born in 1902), father of Marie-Claude Irène Mange Erskine and Ariane Mange Peeters, heirs to their uncle.

== Works from the donation to the National Gallery (1968) ==
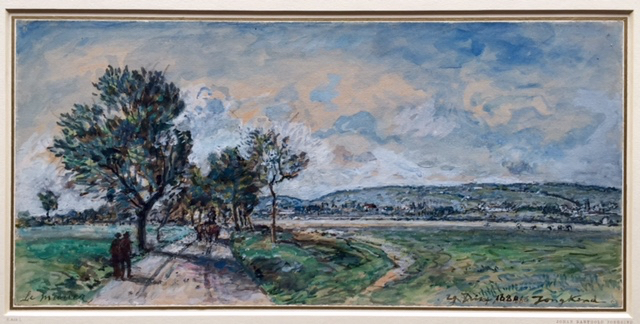
J.B. Jongkind, Route au printemps : le mûrier, 1880, watercolour and black chalk, British Museum

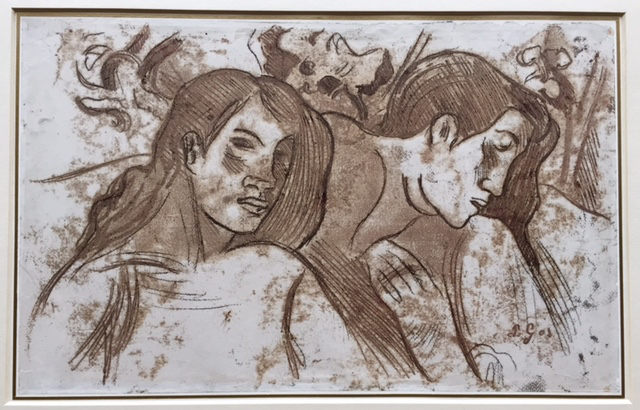
Paul Gauguin, Études de têtes tahitiennes, v. 1902, monotype and graphite, British Museum

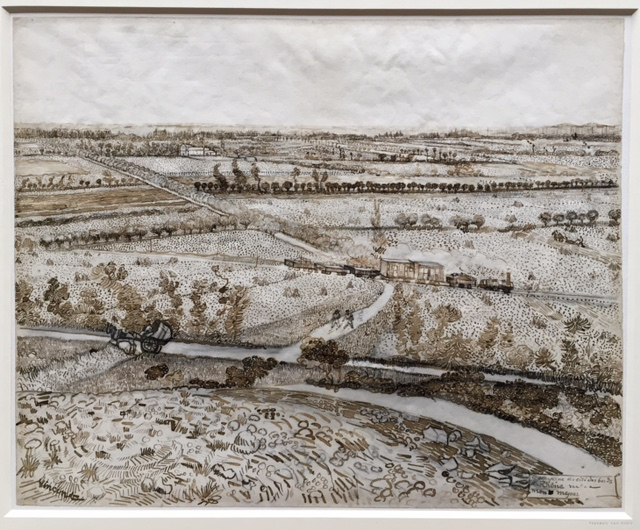
V. Van Gogh, La Crau depuis Montmajour, 1888, pencil and brown ink, British Museum
- Paul-André Lemoisne, Degas et son œuvre, Paris : Arts et Métiers graphiques, "Les artistes et leurs œuvres", 1949, 4 vol.
- César M. de Hauke, Seurat et son œuvre, Paris : Gründ, "Les artistes et leurs œuvres", 1961, 2 vol.
- Madeleine Grillaert Dortu, Toulouse-Lautrec et son œuvre, New York : Collectors éd., "Les artistes et leurs œuvres", 1971, 6 vol.

== Bibliography ==
- P. H. Hulton, The César Mange de Hauke bequest (Londres : British Museum, 1968, 39 p.);
- Sébastien Chauffour,"Promoting the Taste for French Modern Art among American Collectors During the Interwar Period: J. Seligmann & Co., Bernheim Jeune, and César de Hauke. New York, 1926–1940", talk given at College Art Association 2015 Conference (panel by L. Catterson and C. Vignon), New York, 14 févr. 2015;
- Sébastien Chauffour, "Selling French Modern Art in the American Market: César de Hauke as agent of Jacques Seligmann & Co., 1925-1940", Dealing Art on Both Side of the Atlantic, 1860-1940, Lynn Catterson (éd.), Leiden: Brill, 2017.
- Maurice Marinot - Penser en verre (catalogue de l'exposition au musée d'Art moderne de Troyes du au 9/07/ au 31/10/2010 - Somogy, 2010)

== See also ==
- France during World War II
- Nazi plunder
- List of claims for restitution for Nazi-looted art
