= Fryderyk Karol Emanuel Hauke =

Fryderyk Hauke
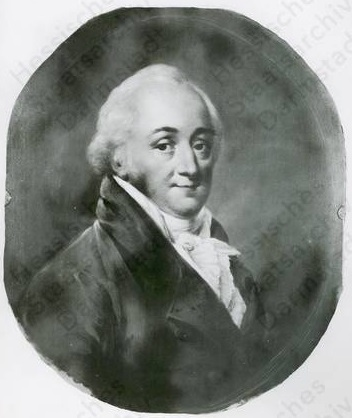
- 1806 Portrait by Alexander Molinari, 1806.
- Born: Johann Friedrich Michael Hauck; 4 October 1737; Mainz, Holy Roman Empire
- Died: 18 June 1810 (aged 72); Warsaw, Duchy of Warsaw, Poland
- Occupation: Academician
- Spouse: Maria Salomea Schweppenhäuser (m. 1773)
- Parents: Ignatz Marianus Hauck (father); Maria Franziska Riedesel zu Eisenbach (mother)
- Family: Hauke-Bosak

Fryderyk Karol Emanuel Hauke (born Johann Friedrich Michael Hauck; 4 October 1737 – 18 June 1810) was a Polish and Saxon official, military officer, and teacher of Flemish origin.

== Biography ==
=== Early life ===
Fryderyk Hauke, born as Johann Friedrich Michael Hauck or von Hauck, originated from a noble, Catholic family of Flemish origins, originally using the surname 'de Haacken'. He was the son of Ignatz Marianus Hauck (1705–1784), a government secretary for the Electorate of Mainz (kurmainzischer Regierungssekretär), and Maria Franziska (1718–1785), an illegitimate (later acknowledged) daughter of Baron Georg Riedesel zu Eisenbach.

=== Career ===
In his youth, he served in the Dutch army, then studied in Mainz where he met the son of Alois Friedrich von Brühl, the minister of the Polish king Stanisław August, secretary of the Crown artillery, and the starosta of Warsaw. He joined his service, came to Poland, and settled in Warsaw. In 1782, Hauke and his siblings changed their family name from Hauck to the more phonetic Hauke. In 1785 Count Alois Friedrich von Brühl moved permanently to Saxony, while the Haukes, whose children became attached to Warsaw, remained in Poland. Fryderyk first taught at the Crown Artillery School, then he ran an exclusive private school for boys, attended by the sons of the rich nobility. In 1807 he accepted the post of Professor of German and Mathematics at the Warsaw Lyceum, where he remained until his death.

== Marriage ==
In 1773, Hauke married Maria Salomé Schweppenhäuser (1751–1833). Among their children include General Johann Moritz Hauke, father of Julia, Princess of Battenberg (1825–1895). Through Julia, Friedrich is a direct ancestor of the British and Spanish royal families. Friedrich and Maria Salomé's issue:

- Krystyna (1774–1823), married General Józef Hurtig.
- Jan Maurycy (1775–1830), General and Polish count, father of Julia von Hauke.
- Karolina Ludwika (1777–1858), married Karol Lessel, a confectioner from Warsaw.
- Ludwik August (1779–1851), Councilor of State during Congress Poland, father of General Aleksander Jan Hauke.
- Amelia (1783–1875), never married.
- Krystyn (1785–1803), never married, drowned in Vistula.
- Józef Hauke (1790–1837), General and Polish count, father of Józef Hauke-Bosak.

== Bibliography ==
- Rembowski, Aleksander (1906). Spadek piśmienniczy po generale Maurycym hr. Hauke [The literary legacy of General Maurycy Count Hauke] (in Polish).
