= Maurycy Hauke =

Polish general

Jan Maurycy Hauke
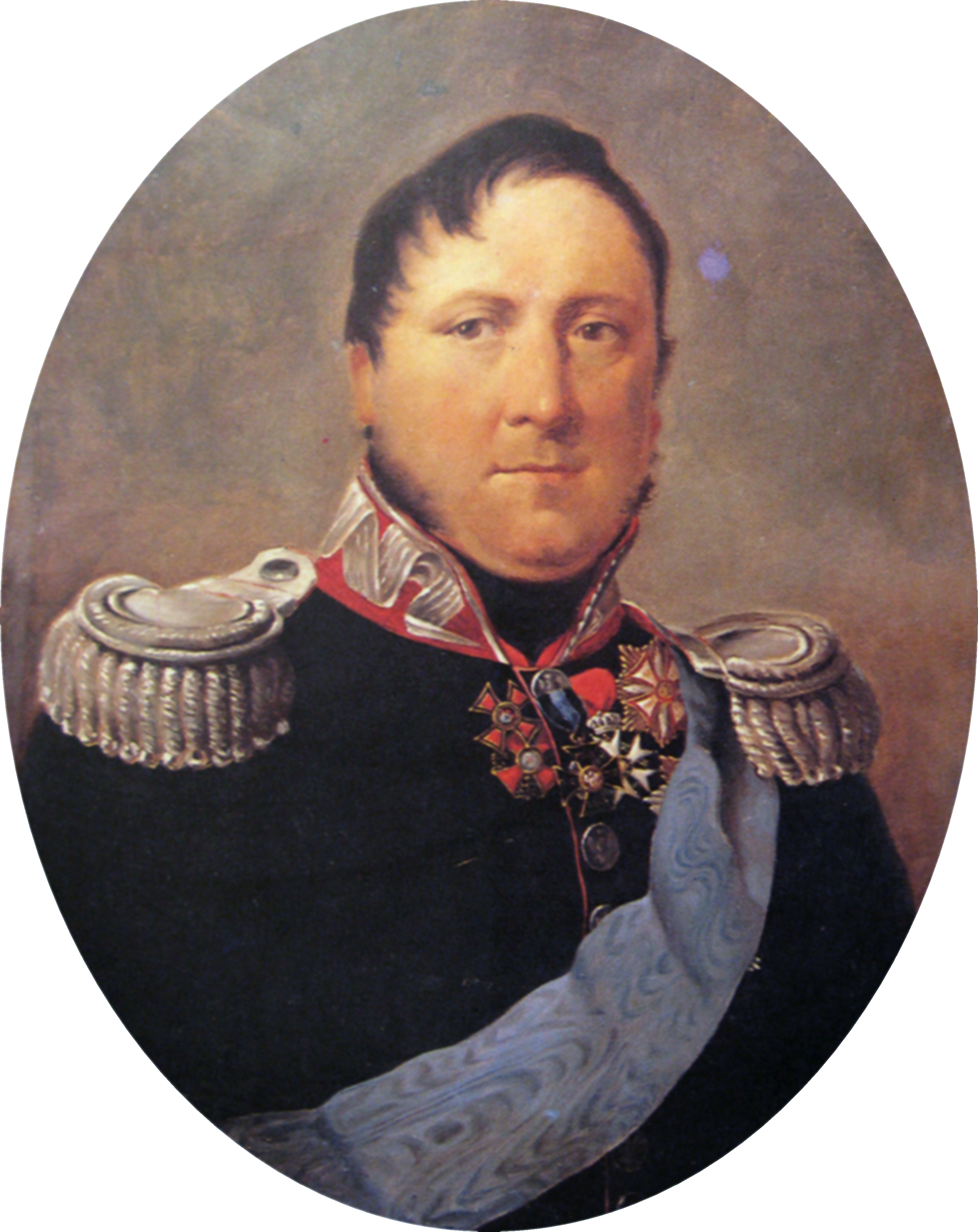
- Portrait by Alexander Molinari
- Born: Hans Moritz Hauke; 26 October 1775; Seifersdorf, Saxony
- Died: 29 November 1830 (aged 55); Warsaw, Congress Kingdom of Poland
- Relatives: Fryderyk Karol Emanuel Hauke (father); Julia Hauke (daughter)
- Military career
- Allegiance: Polish–Lithuanian Commonwealth; Duchy of Warsaw; Congress Poland
- Branch: Army
- Rank: General
- Commands: Deputy Minister of War
- Conflicts: Kościuszko Uprising; Napoleonic Wars; November Uprising †
- Awards: Legion of Honour; Virtuti Militari; Order of Saint Stanislaus; Order of Saint Anna; Order of Saint Alexander Nevsky; Order of the White Eagle

Jan Maurycy Hauke (26 October 1775 – 29 November 1830) was a Polish general and professional soldier of the Hauke family, which had Flemish and Saxon origins.

== Life ==
Maurycy Hauke was the son of Fryderyk Karol Emanuel Hauke (1737–1810), a professor at the Warsaw Lyceum, and served between 1790 and 1793 in the army of Poland during the country's last years of independence. Maurycy Hauke was an alumnus of Warsaw's Corps of Cadets, and fought in the Kościuszko Uprising, the Polish Legions in France and later served in the army of the Duchy of Warsaw in Austria, Italy, Germany and the Peninsular War. After 1815, Maurycy joined the army of Congress Poland, reaching the rank of full general in 1826 and receiving a Polish noble title. Recognizing his abilities, Tsar Nicholas I appointed him Deputy Minister of War of Congress Poland and elevated him in 1829 to Count.

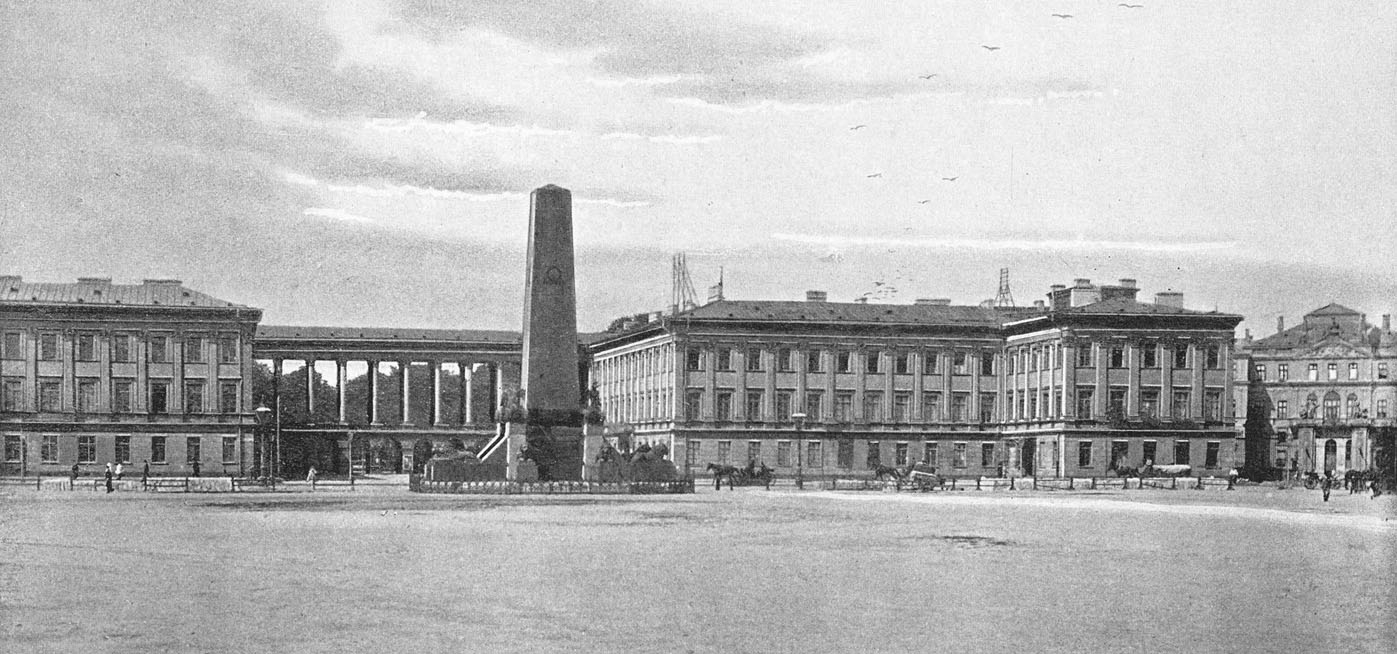
The obelisk in Warsaw on its first site

In the uprising of 1830 led by revolutionary army cadets, the target was Grand Duke Constantine, Poland's Governor-General. Count Maurycy Hauke was on his way to the Grand Duke who managed to escape, but Hauke was shot to death by the cadets on the street of Warsaw before the eyes of his wife, Sophie Lafontaine (daughter of Franz Leopold Lafontaine), and his three younger children.

He was riding on a horse beside the carriage of his wife and having met a group of rebels who shouted: "Be our leader, General!" Hauke reprimanded them and told them to go back to their quarters, whereupon they opened fire and killed him. His wife died shortly afterward, and their younger children were made wards of the Tsar, while three elder sons joined the uprising and one of them, Maurice Leopold, fell during the battle of Ostrołęka in 1831 only 17 years old. After his victory over the Poles, the Tsar raised in 1841 an enormous obelisk in Warsaw, which was dedicated to the memory of Hauke and five other Polish generals who "preserved their fidelity to their Monarch". Detested by the inhabitants of the Polish capital, the obelisk was pulled down in 1917.

He married Sophie Lafontaine (1790 – 1831) and had several children:

1. Maurycy Napoleon Kazimierz (26 October 1808 – 1852)
2. Teodor (born 1810)
3. Władysław Leopold Maurycy (27 June 1812 – 1841)
4. Józef (19 March 1814 – 18 May 1831), died aged 17.
5. Zofia Teresa Salomea (18 January 1816 – 8 August 1861), married her cousin Aleksander Jan Hauke and had six surviving children.
6. Aleksander (1820-1829)
7. Emilia Wiktoria Joanna (27 September 1821 – 7 November 1890), married Baron Karl August von Stackelberg and had eight surviving children, including Konstantin and Georg von Stackelberg.
8. Julia Teresa Salomea (12 October 1825 – 18 September 1895), married Prince Alexander of Hesse and by Rhine and had five children.

On 28 October 1851, Hauke's youngest daughter, Countess Julia Hauke, then lady-in-waiting to Russian Empress Maria Alexandrovna, married Prince Alexander of Hesse and by Rhine, Maria's brother. Julia became an ancestress of the Mountbatten family, the British royal family, and the Spanish royal family. Hauke's older daughter, Katarzyna, became the mistress of Paul Friedrich, Grand Duke of Mecklenburg.

=== Orders and decorations ===
- Legion of Honour, 1807
- Virtuti Militari (Knight's Cross, 3rd class, very rarely awarded)
- Order of Saint Stanislaus, 1st class, 1814
- Order of St. Anna, 1st class, 1815
- Order of St. Anna, 1st class with diamonds, 1818
- Order of St. Alexander Nevsky, 1820
- Order of the White Eagle, 1829

== Ancestry ==
Ancestors of Maurycy Hauke

8. Johann Gaspar Hauck
4. Ignatz Marianus Hauck
9. Johanna Barbara Mederacke
2. Friedrich Karl Emanuel Hauke
10. Baron George XX. Riedesel zu Eisenbach
5. Maria Franziska Riedesel zu Eisenbach
11. Margarethe Kilian
1. Count Hans Moritz Hauke
12. Johann Schweppenhauser
6. Heinrich Wilhelm Schweppenhäuser
13. Maria Magdalena Boell
3. Maria Salomé Schweppenhäuser
14. Johann Heinrich Westermann
7. Charlotte Philippine Juliane Westermann
15. Sophia Elisabeth Eleonore Bode

== See also ==
- Hauke-Bosak family
