= Alexander Molinari =

German-born portrait painter of Italian ancestry

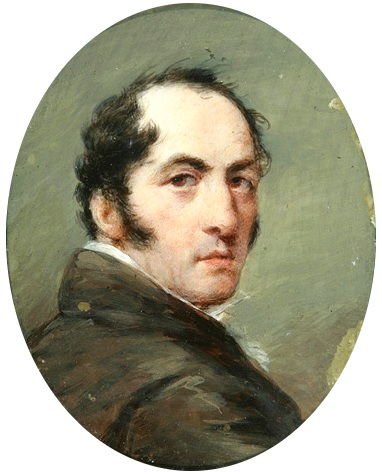
Self-portrait (miniature, c. 1820)

Alexander Molinari, also known as Alessandro and Alois (5 January 1772, Berlin – 20 January 1831, Dresden) was a Kingdom of Prussia-born portrait painter of Italian descent. He worked in several countries, but is best-known for his portraits of the Russian and Polish nobility.

== Biography ==
From 1787, he studied at the Berlin Academy of Arts, where he excelled in portraits. After graduating, he worked in Rome (1795), Vienna (1796-1797), Glogau and, around 1800, Weimar. While decorating a church in Glogau, he met and befriended the writer, E. T. A. Hoffmann. Later, he would be the inspiration for the artist, "Berthold", in Hoffmann's story, The Jesuit Church in G (1817).

The year 1806 found him in Saint Petersburg, where he was warmly welcomed by Salvatore Tonci, the unofficial leader of an Italian artists' colony in Moscow. By 1807, he was well-established as a portrait painter. In 1810, with Tonci's assistance, he was able to find employment as a drawing teacher for the family of Count Dmitri Buturin, a bibliophile and amateur poet: living on his estate north of Obninsk.

He soon became a favourite artist of the Russian aristocracy; who admired his knowledge of foreign art, and corresponded with many, including Tsar Alexander I. Occasionally, he collaborated with another well-known portraitist, Orest Kiprensky.

In 1816, he and Kiprensky both left Russia, possibly for political reasons. He went to Warsaw and lived there until 1822. This was followed by periods in Berlin and Dresden, where he died suddenly from a stroke at the age of fifty-nine.

His works may be seen at the Hermitage Museum, the Tretyakov Gallery, the Russian Museum, and the Pushkin Museum.

== Selected portraits ==
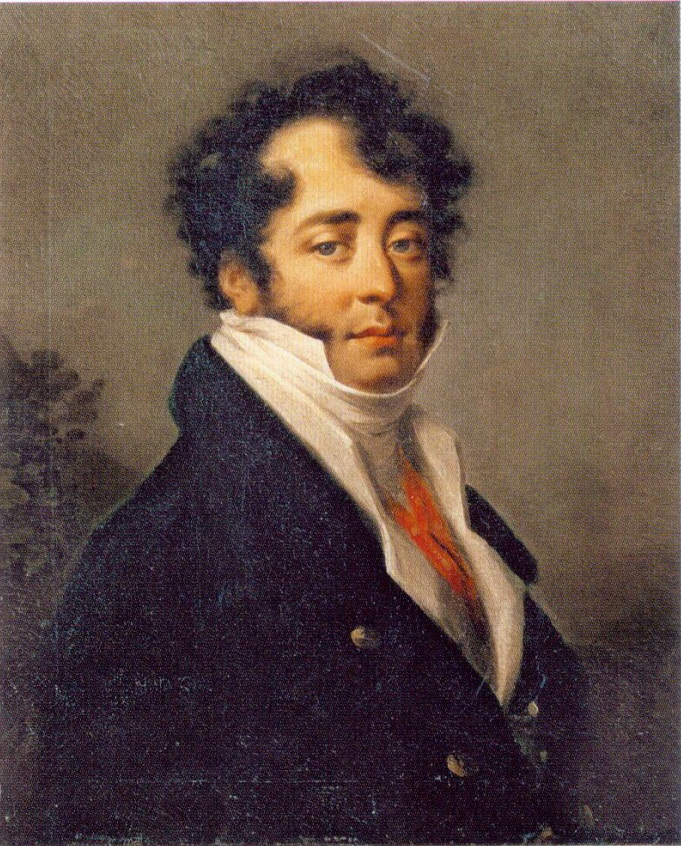
Prince Yegor Golitsyn

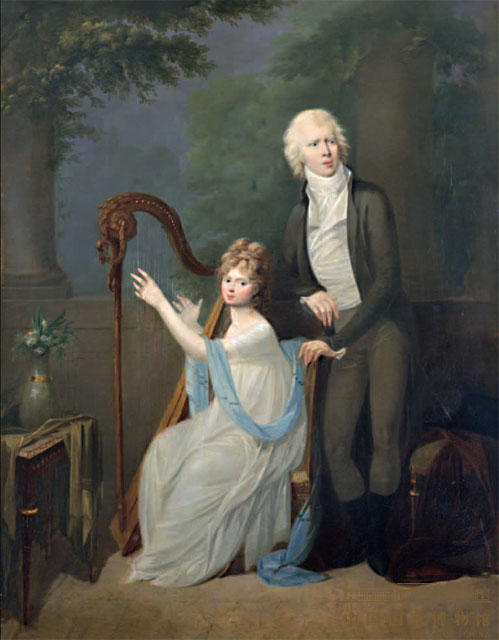
Duke Augustus and his wife, Louise

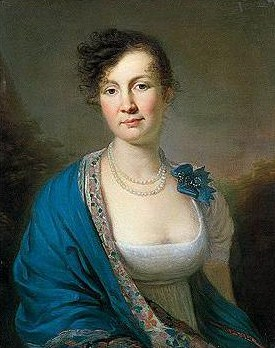
Countess Natalia Zubova

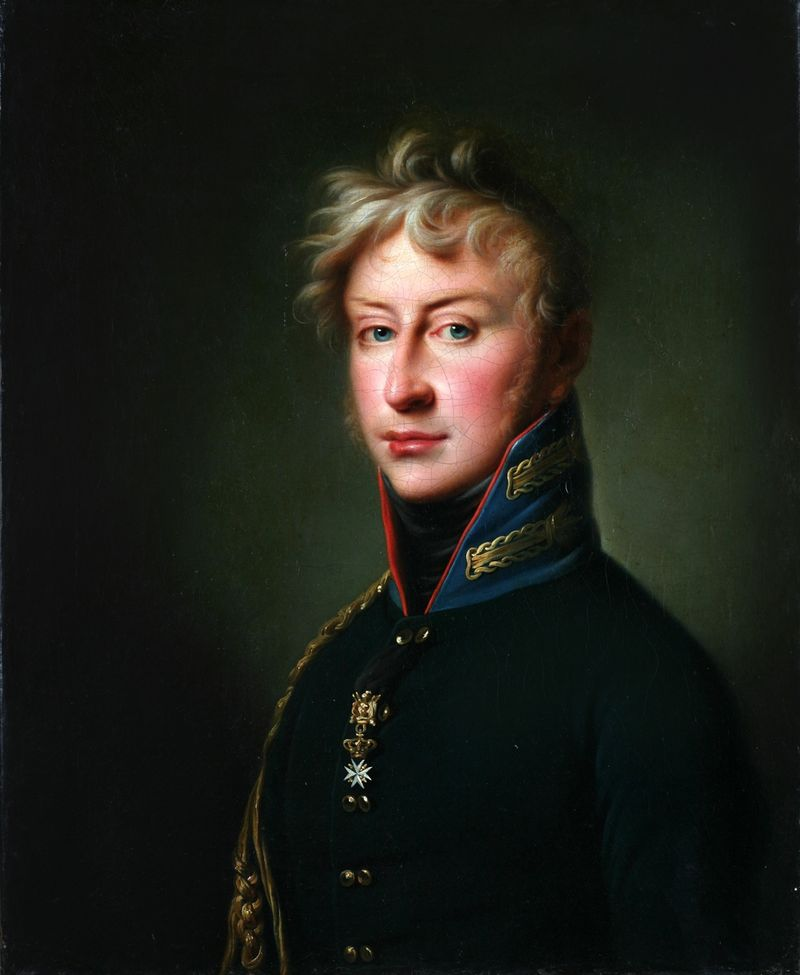
Prince Vladimir Golitsyn

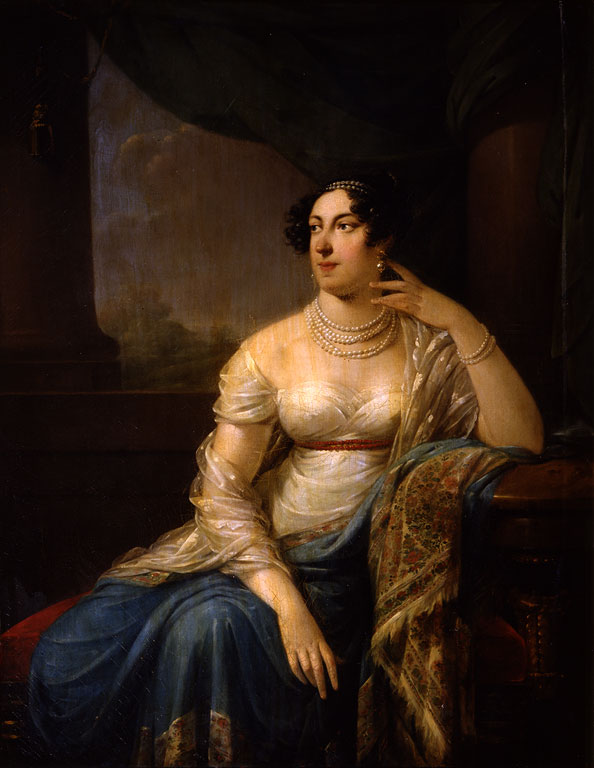
Countess Natalia Saltykova-Golovkina

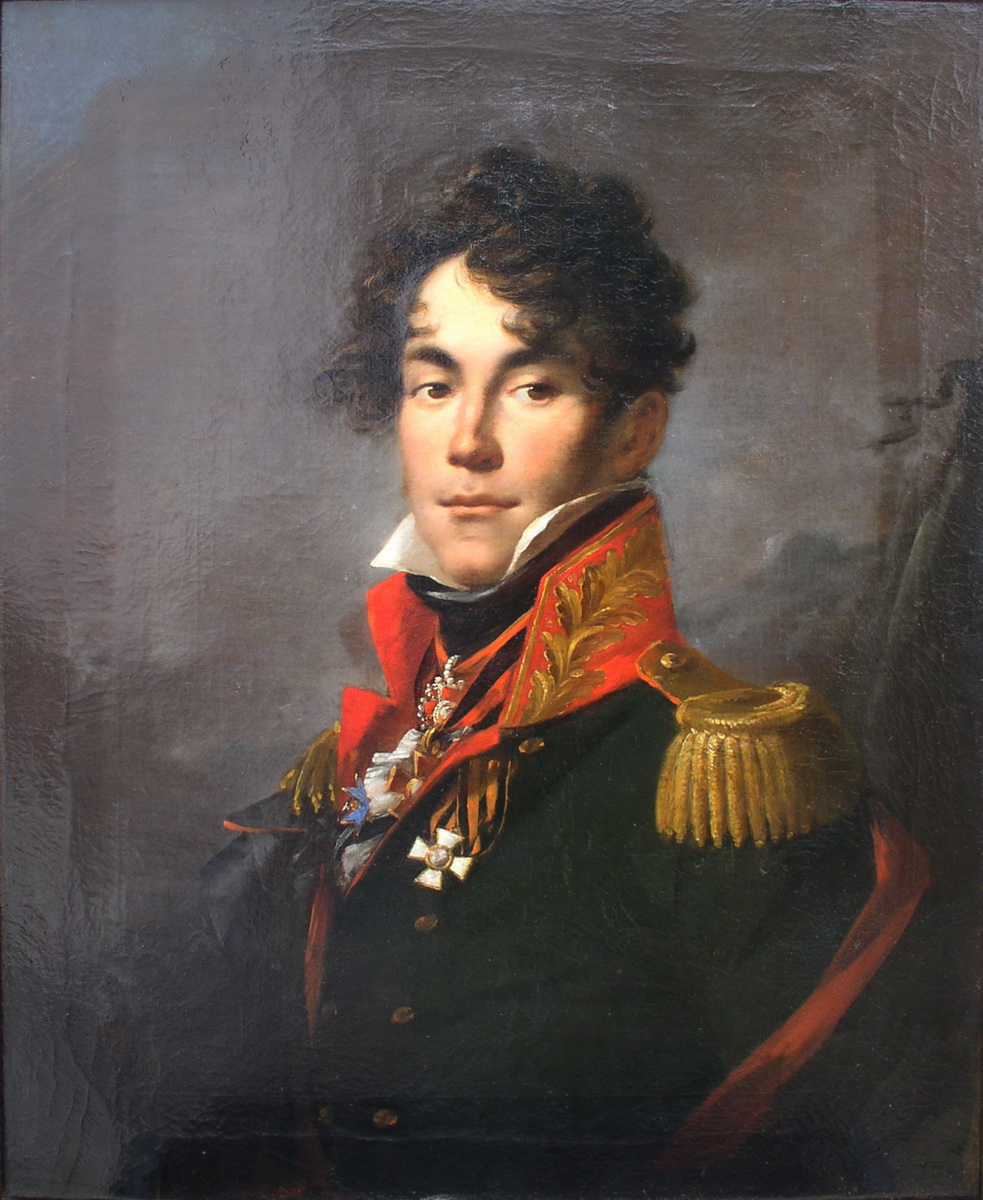
Count Karl de Balmen
