= Franz Leopold Lafontaine =

German physician (1756–1812)

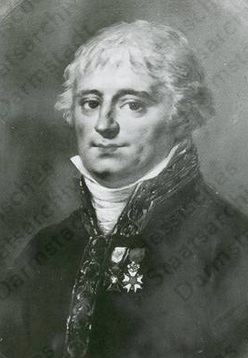
- Franz Leopold Lafontaine
- Born: Franz Anton Leopold; 14 January 1756; Biberach an der Riss
- Died: 12 December 1812 (aged 56); Mogilev
- Occupation: Surgeon
- Known for: Work on catarrh
- Spouse: Maria Theresia Kornély

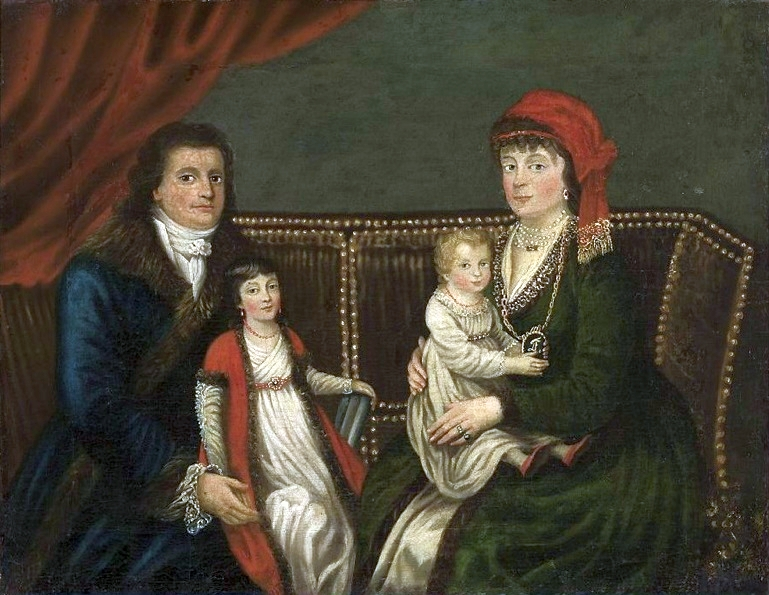
Franz Leopold Lafontaine with his wife Maria Theresia Kornély and daughters Zofia and Wiktoria.

Franz Anton Leopold Lafontaine (Polish: Franciszek Lafontaine; 14 January 1756 – 12 December 1812) was a German-born Polish military surgeon. He was known as the editor of the first Polish medical journal and for his work on catarrh.

== Early life ==
Leopold was born in Biberach as the son of Benno Leopold Ignatius Lafontaine (1731–1777), a merchant, and his wife Maria Katharina Franziska Leonhardt (b. 1725). It is possible that the Lafontaine family was descended from a Huguenot refugee.

He was physician to the last king of Poland, Stanisław August Poniatowski.

== Marriage and descendants ==
He married Maria Theresia Kornély (1765–1827), daughter of Joseph Kornély (né Nathan Adelkind), a wealthy Polish-Hungarian Court Jew converted to Catholicism. Kornély was a Jewish merchant, originally from Poland, established in Ungvár, Hungary. Baptized, he took the name of Joseph Kornély, in memory of an illustrious ancestor, Cornelius Adelkind, a 16th-century Venetian printer and publisher. They had two daughters:

- Sophie (1790–1831), married Count Hans Moritz von Hauke. Through her, Lafontaine was the maternal grandfather of Julia, Princess of Battenberg. Through her, Lafontaine is an ancestor to Charles III and other descendants of Prince Philip, Duke of Edinburgh, in the British royal family, and also an ancestor to King Felipe VI of Spain and other descendants of Victoria Eugenie of Battenberg, in the Spanish royal family.
- Victoria (1797–1849), married firstly Kazimierz Tomasz Słupecki, Rawicz coat of arms (1782–1832) and married secondly Stanislaus Albert Friedrich von Lessel (1807–1888). She had issue from both marriages.

== Other sources ==
- Kierzek, Andrzej (2010). "Franciszek Leopold Lafontaine (1756–1812) and his work on catarrh". Otolaryngol Pol (in Polish). 64 (2). Poland: 118–21. doi:10.1016/S0030-6657(10)70047-0. ISSN 0030-6657. PMID 20568542.
