= Louise Mountbatten =

Queen of Sweden from 1950 to 1965

Louise
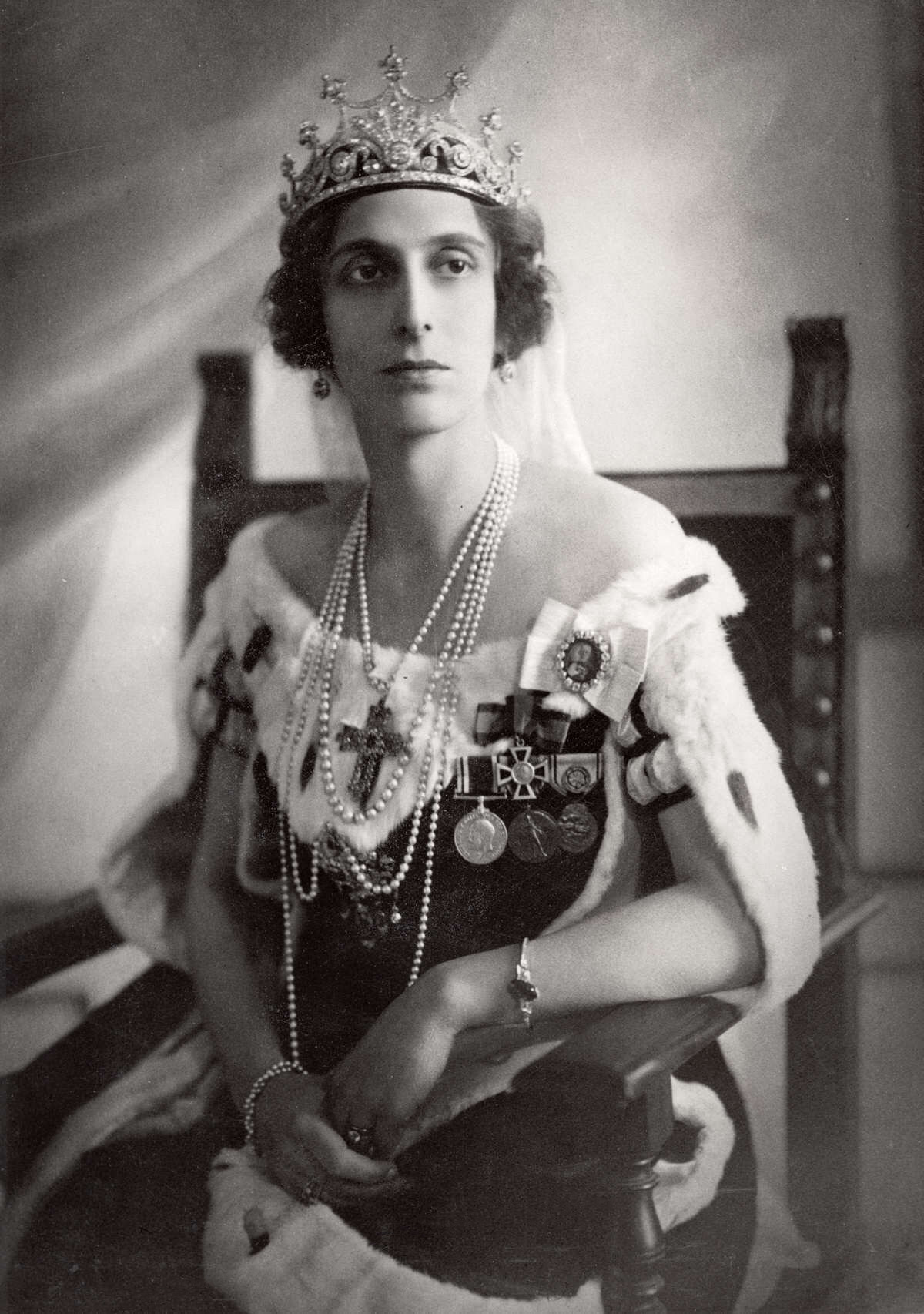
- Photograph by Atelier Jaeger, 1925

Queen consort of Sweden
- Tenure: 29 October 1950 – 7 March 1965
- Born: Princess Louise of Battenberg; 13 July 1889; Schloss Heiligenberg, Jugenheim, Grand Duchy of Hesse, German Empire
- Died: 7 March 1965 (aged 75); Saint Göran Hospital, Stockholm, Sweden
- Burial: 13 March 1965; Royal Cemetery, Solna, Sweden
- Spouse: Gustaf VI Adolf of Sweden (m. 1923)
- House: Battenberg (by birth); Mountbatten (from 1917)
- Father: Louis Mountbatten, 1st Marquess of Milford Haven
- Mother: Princess Victoria of Hesse and by Rhine

Louise Alexandra Marie Irene Mountbatten (born Princess Louise of Battenberg; later Lady Louise Mountbatten; 13 July 1889 – 7 March 1965) was Queen of Sweden from 29 October 1950 until her death in 1965 as the wife of King Gustaf VI Adolf. Born a princess of the German House of Battenberg, Louise was closely related to the ruling families of Britain, as a great-granddaughter of Queen Victoria, and of Russia, as a niece of Empress Alexandra Feodorovna of Russia. She was also an older sister to Lord Mountbatten and aunt to Prince Philip, Duke of Edinburgh. During the First World War, Louise served as a nurse in the Red Cross. She married the widowed Swedish crown prince Gustaf Adolf in 1923 and held the title of crown princess until his accession in 1950, when she became queen. Louise was noted for her eccentricity and progressive views.

== Early life ==
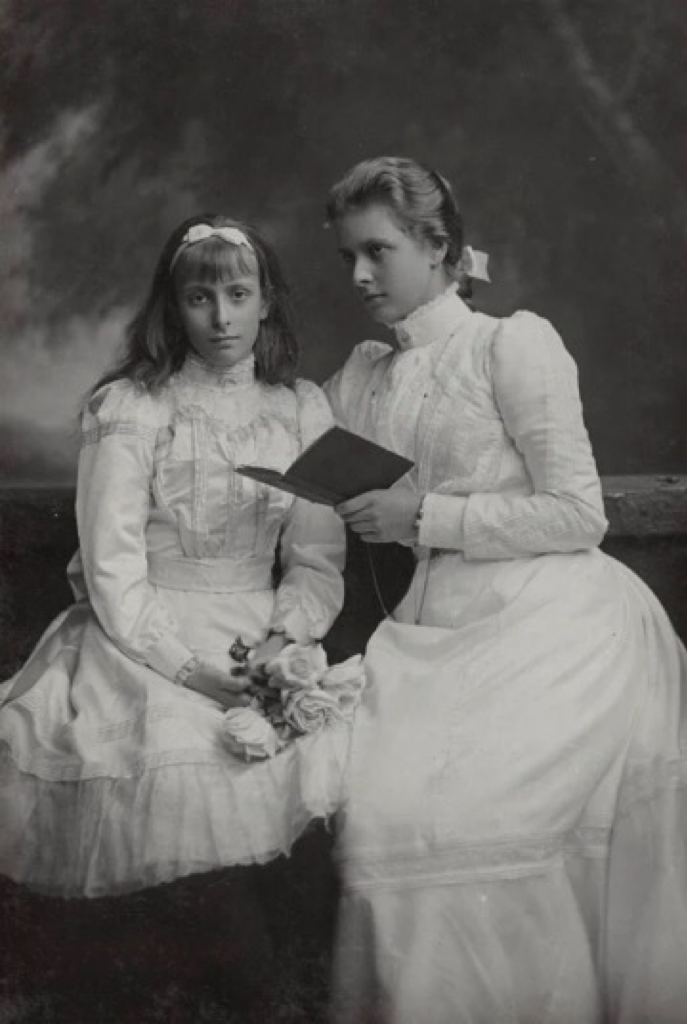
Louise with Alice (1900)

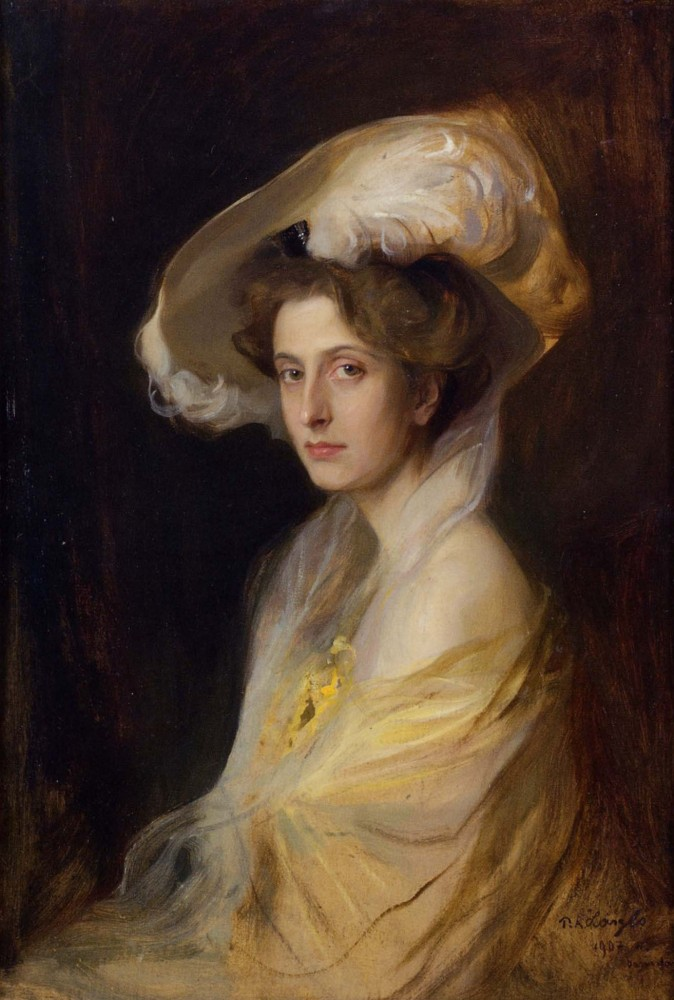
Louise in 1907 painted by Philip de László

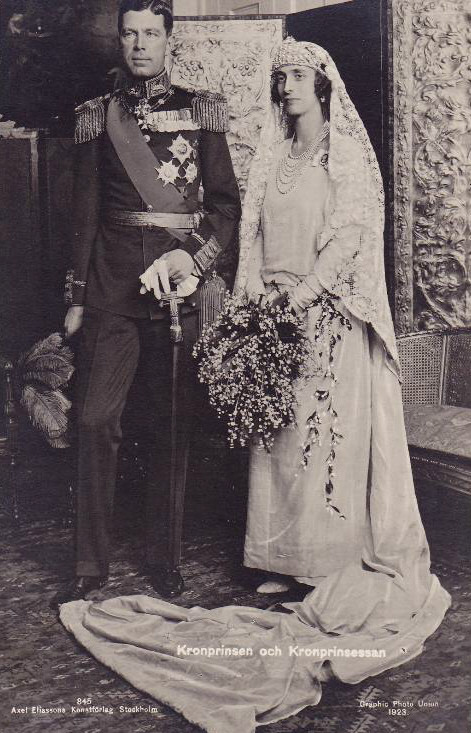
Wedding portrait from 1923 of Lady Louise and Crown Prince Gustaf Adolf

Louise was born a Princess of Battenberg at Schloss Heiligenberg, Seeheim-Jugenheim, in the Grand Duchy of Hesse.

Her father, Prince Louis of Battenberg, who was an admiral in the British Royal Navy, renounced his German title during the First World War and anglicised his family name to "Mountbatten" at the behest of George V. He was then created the first Marquess of Milford Haven in the peerage of the United Kingdom. From 1917, therefore, his daughter was known as "Lady Louise Mountbatten".

Her mother was Princess Victoria of Hesse and by Rhine, a granddaughter of Queen Victoria. Louise was a sister of Louis Mountbatten, 1st Earl Mountbatten of Burma, and of Princess Alice of Battenberg who was the mother of Prince Philip, Duke of Edinburgh. She was also a maternal niece of Empress Alexandra Feodorovna of Russia.

Because of her father's work, the family moved around between different territories in the British Empire, such as Malta, but they returned often to the Heiligenberg outside Darmstadt which they considered their holiday home, always retaining a residence in England. Louise often visited her great-grandmother Queen Victoria on the Isle of Wight with her mother during her childhood. The family is described as harmonious; the parents of Louise lived in a happy loving relationship, not in an arranged marriage, and Louise was particularly close to her brother, with whom she corresponded until her death. Louise and her sister were educated by governesses, except for a brief period at Texter's girls school in Darmstadt.

In 1914, Louise and her mother visited the Russian Empire, and were invited to a trip down the Volga with their Imperial relatives. During her visit, Louise noted the influence of Rasputin with concern. The trip was interrupted by the sudden outbreak of the First World War, and Louise's father telegraphed for them to return immediately. Louise's mother gave her jewellery to the empress for safe keeping, and they left Russia by boat from Hapsal in Estonia and travelled to neutral Sweden, paying for the trip with gold, as their money was suddenly not acceptable currency in Russia. They stayed in Sweden as guests of Crown Prince Gustaf Adolf and Crown Princess Margaret, her first cousin once removed, at Drottningholm Palace, just one night before they returned to Great Britain.

During the First World War, Louise was first active within the Soldiers and Sailors Families Association and the Smokes for Soldiers and Sailors, but she soon enlisted in the Red Cross for service as a nurse. She was active at a French military hospital in Nevers, and then at a war hospital at Palaves outside Montpellier, from March 1915 until July 1917. She was commended for her hard work, and was awarded the British War and Victory Medals, a medal from the British Red Cross, as well as the Médaille de la Reconnaissance française. After the war, she was active in social work for the children in the slums of Battersea in London.

== Courtships ==
In 1909, Louise received a proposal from Manuel II of Portugal. Her grand-uncle, Edward VII, the British monarch, was in favour of the match, but Louise declined, as she wished to marry for love. At the age of twenty, Louise became secretly engaged to Prince Christopher of Greece, but they were forced to give up their relationship for financial reasons. Shortly before World War I broke out, Louise fell in love with a man of whom her parents approved but he was killed in the early days of the war. Later during the war, while she volunteered as a nurse in Nevers, she began a relationship with Alexander Stuart-Hill, a Scottish artist living in Paris. Anticipating that her parents would be disappointed in her choice, Louise kept their engagement a secret. Eventually, she confided in her parents, who were understanding, and invited Stuart-Hill for visits at Kent House twice. In fact, her family, referring to him as "Shakespeare" because of his odd appearance, found him "eccentric" and "affected". Lacking resources, the engaged couple agreed to postpone marriage until after the war. In 1918, however, Louise's father explained to her that Stuart-Hill was most likely homosexual, and that a marriage with him was impossible.

In 1923, Crown Prince Gustaf Adolf of Sweden, having been for three years the widower of Louise's mother's cousin Princess Margaret of Connaught, paid a visit to London and, to Louise's surprise, began to court her. Although as a young woman Louise had said that she would never marry a king or a widower, she accepted the proposal of a widower destined to be king. However, under §5 of the 1810 Swedish Succession Law (Act 1810:0926), a prince of the Swedish royal house forfeited his right of succession to the throne if he "with or without the King's knowledge and consent, married a private Swedish or foreign man's daughter" (med eller utan Konungens vetskap och samtycke, tager till gemål enskild svensk eller utländsk mans dotter). Once the couple's engagement was announced, there were lively discussions in the media about whether the bride-to-be was constitutionally eligible to become Sweden's future queen. In response, the Swedish Foreign Ministry, citing the law in question, clarified the term "a private Swedish or foreign man's daughter" to mean "he who did not belong to a sovereign family or to a family which, according to international practice, would be equal thereto" (som icke vore medlem av suverän familj eller familj som enligt internationell praxis vore därmed likställd), and announced that the Swedish government had "requested the British government's explanation of Lady Louise Mountbatten's position in this respect." The ministry further announced that following the British government's reply to its inquiry and the subsequent investigation into the matter, it had been determined that the Crown Prince's choice of a future wife was in compliance with the succession law, thereby concluding debate on the imminent nuptials.

On 27 October 1923, Sweden and Britain's respective plenipotentiaries signed the "Treaty between Great Britain and Sweden for the Marriage of Lady Louise Mountbatten with His Royal Highness Prince Gustaf Adolf, Crown Prince of Sweden". The treaty stated, in part, that the kings of the United Kingdom and Sweden "having judged it proper that an alliance should again be contracted between their respective Royal Houses by a marriage...have agreed upon and concluded the following Articles", which articles declared that the marriage would be celebrated in London and duly authenticated, that the couple's financial settlements would be expressed in a separate marriage contract which was declared to be "an integral part of the present Treaty", and that the two nations' ratifications of the treaty would be exchanged in Stockholm, which formally occurred 12 November 1923.

On 3 November 1923, at age 34, Louise married Crown Prince Gustaf Adolf, in the Chapel Royal at St. James's Palace in the presence of George V and members of both royal families.

== Crown princess ==
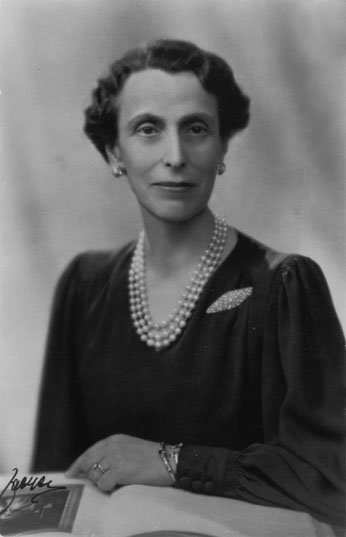
Louise as crown princess in 1945

The marriage between Louise and Gustav Adolf was by all accounts a love match and described as very happy. She was also liked by her mother-in-law because of her friendly nature, although they seldom saw each other, as Queen Victoria spent most of her time in Italy. The fact that the queen spent most of her time abroad meant that Louise took on many royal duties from the beginning, which was initially hard for her as she was at this point described as quite shy.

After the queen's death in 1930, Louise was officially the first lady of the nation, expected to perform all the duties of a queen, twenty years before she actually became queen. This meant that Louise was to take over the protection of all the organisations and associations traditionally assigned to the queen. She was made the protector of the Swedish Red Cross, Children's Hospital of Crown Princess Louise, Eugenia Home, Drottningens centralkommitté ('Queen's Emergency Relief Committee'), Arbetsflitens Befrämjande ('The Promoting of Diligence'), Sophiahemmet and Svenska Hemslöjdsföreningarns Riksförbund ('Swedish Handicraft's Society'). Regarding this matter, Louise remarked: "It is hard for me to be the protector of different institutions, as I have been accustomed to practical work, as an ordinary person, before my marriage". As a former nurse, a fact she was proud to point out, Louise was interested in improving the working conditions for nurses.

On 30 May 1925, Louise gave birth to her only child, a stillborn daughter.

In 1926–1927, the crown princely couple made an international trip around the world to benefit Swedish interests, which was described as a great success, especially the trip to the United States, during which they travelled across the nation from New York City to San Francisco. Public interest was high, and the couple acquired a reputation for being "democratic", after having refused such formalities as greeting the guests at a reception sitting on thrones, which they had been invited to do at the reception of an American millionaire. During an interview in Salt Lake City, Louise stated that she believed in gender equality and that women are fully capable of being active within all professions and in the business world, as well as within politics: "Women are completely intellectually equal to men and, provided they are given sufficient education, are just as capable to deserve respect and admiration as men in this field". In 1934–35, she made a similar trip with Gustav Adolf to Greece and around the Middle East and Africa, called the Orient Tour. In 1936, Louise attended the funeral of George V of the United Kingdom.

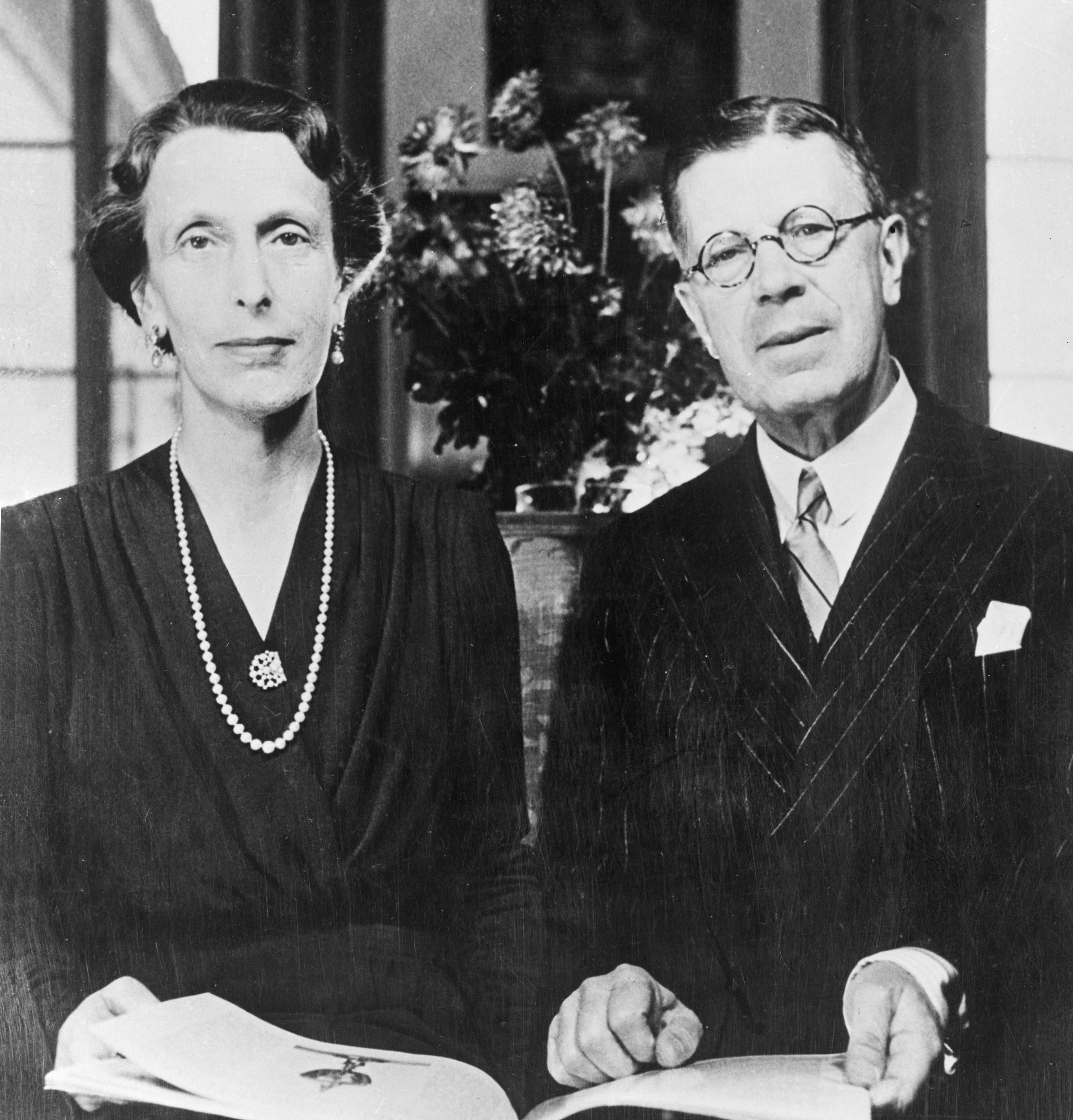
The Crown Prince and Crown Princess in 1945

During World War II, Louise was active in aid work within the Red Cross. She collected candles and other non-electric light sources for the needy during the campaign "Vinterljus" (English: Winter Lights). Another contribution was Kronprinsessans Gåvokommitté för Neutralitetsvakten (English: "The Crown Princess Gift Association For the Neutral Defence Forces"), which provided the soldiers mobilised to guard the borders of neutral Sweden with gifts: normally socks, scarfs and caps knitted by contributors from all over the country. As a citizen of a neutral country, Louise was also able to act as a messenger between relatives and friends across warfaring borders. She also provided supplies to many private citizens in this way, such as "two old ladies in Münich", the former German language teacher of her husband's late wife, and the exiled Princess Tatiana of Russia in Palestine. It is said many would have died, had it not been for Louise's help. In 1940, for example, she sent supplies to the British major Michael Smiley of the Rifle Brigade, who was captured and placed in a prisoner of war camp, after his mother-in-law Alicia Pearson had asked for her help. During the Finnish Winter War, Louise set up a home for Finnish war orphans at Ulriksdal Palace.

== Queen consort ==
In 1950, Louise became queen after her husband's accession to the throne. Louise is described as a true democrat at heart, and was therefore somewhat disturbed at being celebrated merely in her capacity of queen. In reference to the attention, she remarked: "People look at me as if I were something special. Surely I do not look differently today from how I looked yesterday!"

Louise disliked the strict pre-World War I protocol at court, retained during her mother-in-law's era, and reformed it when she became queen, instituting new guidelines in 1954 which democratised many old customs. In 1962, she abolished the court presentations, replaced them with "democratic ladies' lunches", to which she invited professional career women, a custom which was to continue under Princess Sibylla after her death. Louise also renovated and redecorated the interior of the Royal Palace in Stockholm.

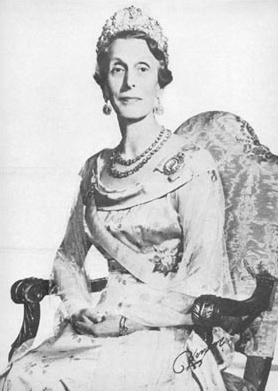
Queen Louise in 1963

Louise was described as eccentric for royalty and temperamental; she could get very angry, but was said to possess a good heart, a great sense of humour, a sense of self-irony and was able to distinguish between herself and her royal role. She could show her sympathies openly, and this was taken as a sign of her honesty. One courtier commented, "I would describe the queen as a 'gentleman'. She would never avoid acknowledging her own mistakes". Louise is described as a great lover and patriot of her new home country, and was often shocked by Swedish non-patriotic customs. She was a supporter of the political system and democracy in the form it had developed in Sweden and stated her opinion to her relatives that no other political system than the Swedish one had created such a happy development for any nation. Louise also admired Swedish nature and in particular Swedish women, because of what she considered their natural dignity regardless of class, and remarked that she had never seen a country with less vulgarity than Sweden.

After having taken summer vacations with her husband in Italy every year, she always departed before he did to visit England prior to returning to Sweden. A popular story told of her alleges that Louise, after almost being hit by a bus in London (because she would often jay-walk), took to carrying a small card with the words, "I am the Queen of Sweden" printed on it, so that people would know who she was in case she was hit by a vehicle. In London, she often stayed at the Hyde Park Hotel, often crossing a heavily trafficked street there to shop, which prompted her note.

In 1963, Louise accompanied her spouse on a state visit to France, where she made a great impression on President Charles de Gaulle. At dinner, she said to him: "I must ask you to excuse my ugly French. My French is the one spoken in the trenches of 1914." De Gaulle later attended her memorial service in Paris, which was the first occasion for a French president to visit the Swedish church there, as well as one of only two occasions de Gaulle visited a memorial service of the kind. Louise's last official engagement was the Nobel Prize dinner of 1964, during which no one noticed that she was in fact already ill.

According to Queen Margrethe II of Denmark it was very difficult for Louise to fill the shoes of her husband's first wife. Margrethe and Louise's other step-grandchildren all used the nickname Ist for Louise because when little they could not say Aunt Louise properly. Louise responded good-naturedly by signing all her letters to them that way.

== Death and funeral ==
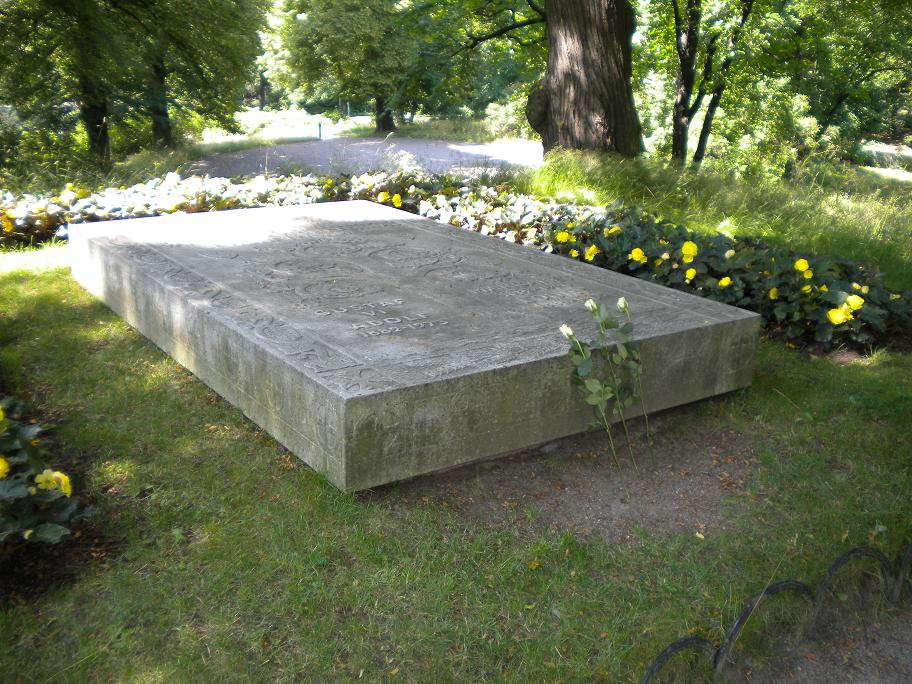
The grave of Louise, Gustaf Adolf and Margaret on Karlsborg Island in Solna, Sweden

Louise died on 7 March 1965 at Saint Göran Hospital, in Stockholm, Sweden, following emergency surgery after a period of severe illness. She had made her last public appearance at the Nobel Prize Ceremony in December 1964. Louise is buried beside her husband and his first wife, Crown Princess Margaret, in the Royal Cemetery in Solna north of Stockholm.

== Honours ==
- Austria: Grand Star of the Decoration for Services to the Republic of Austria
- Denmark: Knight of the Order of the Elephant
- Finland: Grand Cross with Collar of the Order of the White Rose
- Thailand: Dame of the Order of the Royal House of Chakri
- France:
  - Grand Cross of the Legion of Honour
  - Recipient of the Medal of French Gratitude
- Germany: Grand Cross of the Order of Merit of the Federal Republic of Germany
- Netherlands:
  - Knight Grand Cross of the Order of the Netherlands Lion
  - Recipient of the Queen Juliana Investiture Medal
- Sweden:
  - Member of the Royal Order of the Seraphim
  - Recipient of the Royal Family Order of King Gustaf V
  - Recipient of the Royal Family Order of King Gustaf VI Adolf
  - Recipient of the 90th Birthday Badge Medal of King Gustaf V
  - Recipient of the 70th Birthday Badge Medal of King Gustaf V
- United Kingdom:
  - Recipient of the Royal Red Cross (RRC)
  - Recipient of the King George VI Coronation Medal
  - Recipient of the British War Medal
  - Recipient of the Victory Medal
  - Recipient of the Voluntary Medical Service Medal

=== Arms and monogram ===
Louise's coat of arms as
Crown Princess of Sweden

Royal monogram of
Queen Louise of Sweden

Louise's coat of arms as
Queen of Sweden

== Sources ==
- Fjellman, Margit (1965). Drottning Louise: en biografi [Queen Louise – A Biography] (in Swedish). Stockholm: Bonnier. SELIBR 22198.
- Fjellman, Margit (1968). Louise Mountbatten, Queen of Sweden. London: Allen Unwin. ISBN 978-0-04-923044-6.
- Fridh, Kjell (1995). Gamle kungen: Gustaf VI Adolf : en biografi (in Swedish). Stockholm: Wahlström & Widstrand. ISBN 9146164626. SELIBR 7281986.
- Severin, Kid (1963). Vår drottning [Our Queen] (in Swedish). Stockholm: Åhlén & Åkerlund. SELIBR 22696666.
- Ulfsäter-Troell, Agneta (1996). "Drottning Louise" [Queen Louise]. Drottningar är också människor: [sex kvinnoöden på Stockholms slott] [Queens are people too: [six women's fates at Stockholm Palace]] (in Swedish). Smygehamn: Ulfsäter. ISBN 9197276014. SELIBR 7798132.
- Ulfsäter-Troell, Agneta; Söderberg, Marianne (1997). "Louise". Drottning av Sverige (in Swedish). Sveriges Television. – history programme about the six Bernadotte queens consort, from Queen Desirée to Queen Louise (adapted from the book)

Louise Mountbatten Battenberg family Cadet branch of the House of Hesse-Darmstadt Born: 13 July 1889 Died: 7 March 1965
Swedish royalty
Vacant Title last held by Victoria of Baden	Queen consort of Sweden; 1950–1965	Vacant Title next held by Silvia Sommerlath
