= Riedesel =

German noble family

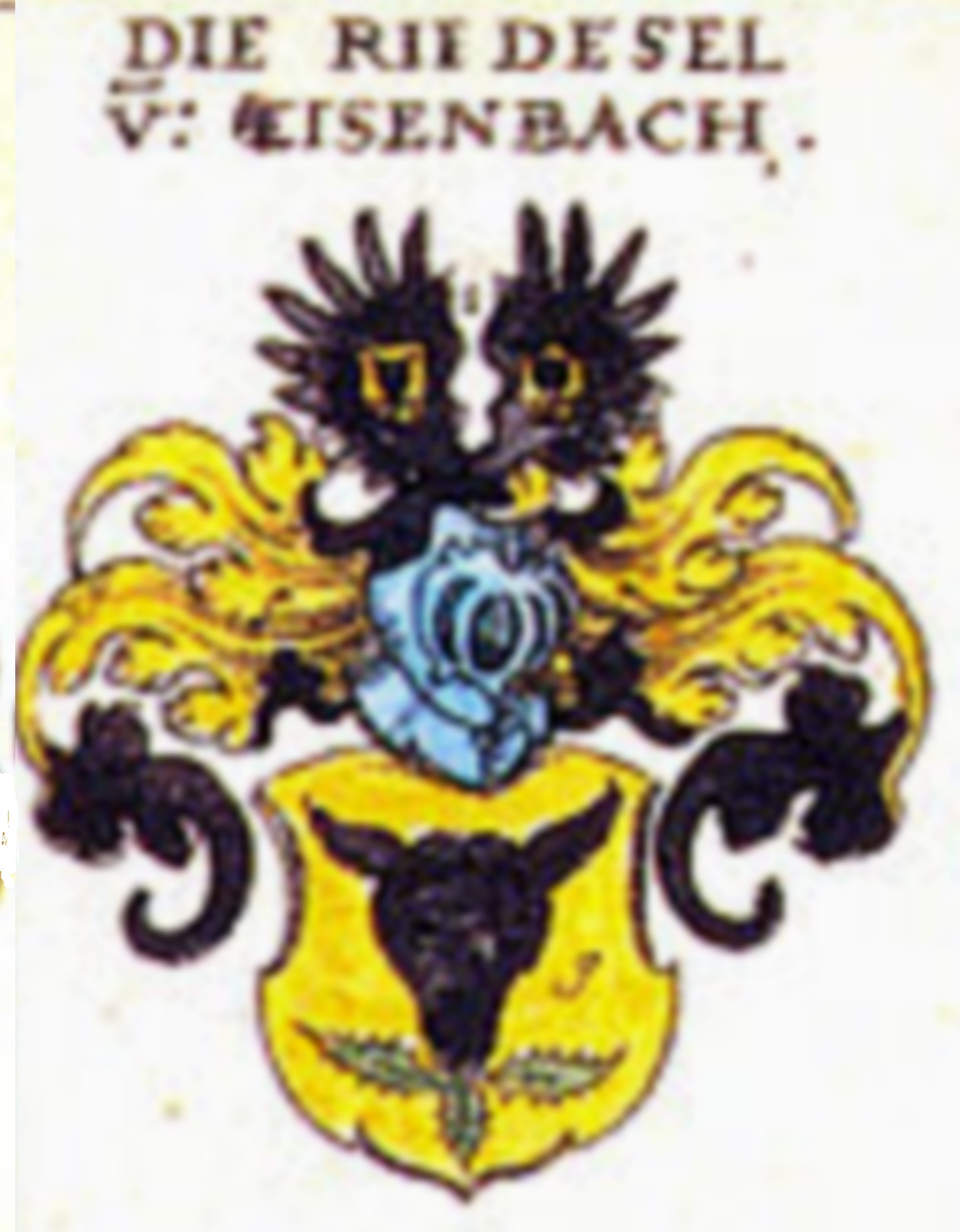
Coat of arms of Riedesel zu Eisenbach

The Riedesel family is an ancient German noble family that began to appear in legal documents in the early 13th century. They were of the knightly class, though not all had the official status of Ritter or knight.

== History ==
Its exact geographical and temporal origins are uncertain. However, all of the early references are from the area of Hesse, and many served as vassals of the Landgrave of Hesse in Marburg. In later centuries, the men served a wide variety of higher nobility as men-at-arms, administrators, and counselors.

Lines of the family are known to have had residences and offices throughout Hesse including Frankfurt, Josbach, Camberg, Bellersheim, Melsungen, as well as in Westphalia. The names employed typically used "zu" to designate their main residence, e.g. the Wappen (coat of arms) of Krafft Riedesel zu Josbach dating from 1523 still hang in the church of Saint Elisabeth in Marburg. Following the example of the Margrave of Hesse to whom they were vassals, the Riedesels were early converts to the Lutheran faith.

With one significant exception, the various lines of Riedesel knights either died out in the male line by the early 17th century or disappeared into the ranks of unfree peasants. Without hereditary lands, they were dependent on fiefs from higher nobility in exchange for their services.

The exception was the line of Riedesels based in Melsungen. Hermann II (1407–1463) of this line married Margareta von Röhrenfurth after establishing himself as an able knight and adviser in the service of Landgrave Ludwig. Hermann took possession of Schloss Eisenbach near Lauterbach (Hesse), as well as other lands and rights. He also took over the office of Erbmarschall zu Hessen (hereditary counselor to the Hessian courts). With this achievement, the Riedesels of Melsungen-Eisenbach had a permanent, hereditary financial base. Their holdings were substantial in comparison with those of most free knights, but still quite minor within the patchwork of German states, secular and ecclesiastical.

In 1680, five of the male Riedesels were granted the title of "Freiherr zu Eisenbach" by the German Emperor, with that title passing to all of their male descendants who reached majority. The title is usually translated as "Baron" in English. The common property of the family was governed by complex arrangements that have kept it intact. Nevertheless, few had enough income to support the lifestyle of even minor nobility without entering the service of greater powers in their armies or administration. Some continued to live around Lauterbach, but many others resided elsewhere.

The best-known member of the family, in the English-speaking world at least, is probably General Friedrich Adolph Riedesel, Freiherr zu Eisenbach (1738–1800). Erroneously known to American historians as "von Riedesel", he commanded a regiment of soldiers from the Duchy of Braunschweig as part of the British forces during the American Revolution. The noble Riedesels lost their sovereignty (and feudal rents and services) in the wake of the Napoleonic Wars, so pursued other enterprises included brewing and forestry.

Far more numerous in Germany and in America are Riedesels who clearly do not descend from the Riedesel Freiherren zu Eisenbach. Their traceable history begins around 1600 in the former Counties (Grafschaften) of Wittgenstein, immediately west of Hesse. A suggested ancestor was from the Riedesel zu Josbach line and settled in Wittgenstein perhaps a century earlier. No member of the Wittgenstein Riedesels is better known than the master builder Mannus Riedesel (1662–1726). The name and the variant of 'Rietesel' were also known among commoners in Vorpommern/Western Pomerania around Stralsund.

== Sources ==
The history of the Riedesel zu Eisenbach has been thoroughly researched and documented in a series of volumes with the overall title of Die Riedesel zu Eisenbach.

1. Vom ersten Auftreten des Namens bis zum Tode Hermanns III. Riedesel 1500 (Dr. E.E. Becker, 1923)

2. Riedeselisches Urkundenbuch 1200 bis 1500 (Dr. E.E. Becker, 1924)

3. Vom Tode Hermanns III. Riedesel 1501 bis zum Tode Konrads II 1593 (Dr. E.E. Becker, 1927)

4. Vom Tode Konrads II 1593 bis zum Vertrag mit Hessen-Darmstadt 1593-1713 (Dr. Fritz Zschaeck, 1957)

5. Vom Reich zum Rheinbund 1713-1806 (Dr. Karl Siegmar Baron von Galéra, 1961)

6. Wege zu neuen Lebensformen 1806-1918 (Dr. Karl Siegmar Baron von Galéra, 1965)

7. Die Riedesel in republikanischen Staatsformen 1918-1965 (Dr. Karl-August Helfenbein, 2003)

The only real source on the Riedesel zu Josbach line and its many branches is: Die Riedesel zu Josbach und ihre Josbacher Stammgüter. Hessiche Familienkunde Heft 1/1964, Heft 2/1964, Heft 4/1964. Gesellschaft für Familienkunde in Kurhessen und Waldeck e.V. (Dr. Ernst Wagner).

Concerning the origins of the Riedesel name in the county of Wittgenstein, from whence all Americans and most Germans bearing the name descend: Die Entstehung des Namens Riedesel in der Graftschaft Wittgenstein: Bekanntes und neue Theorien. Wittgenstein, Blätter des Wittgensteiner Heimatvereins e.V., Volume 71, Number 4, 2007. (Dr. Paul Riedesel and H. Stefan Riedesel). Also: Die Entstehung des Namens Riedesel in der Grafschaft Wittgenstein: Neue Erkenntnisse zu seiner Abstammung.Wittgenstein, Blätter des Wittgensteiner Heimatvereins e.V., Volume 78, Number 2, 2014. (H. Stefan Riedesel and Dr. Paul Riedesel).

Also Riedesel web site has a variety of references and factual information.
