= Mary Teissier =

Ukrainian-French socialite (1917–1990)

- Born: Maria Petrovna Perevostchikova; 27 December 1917; Odessa, Russian Republic
- Died: 1 August 1990 (aged 72); Châteauneuf-Grasse, France
- Occupations: Socialite, interior designer, art collector
- Spouse: Lucien Teissier
- Partner: J. Paul Getty
- Children: 2
- Relatives: Count Aleksey Belevsky-Zhukovsky (grandfather); Grand Duke Alexei Alexandrovich of Russia (great-grandfather); Alexandra Zhukovskaya (great-grandmother)

Mary Teissier (born Maria Petrovna Perevostchikova; 27 December 1917 – 1 August 1990) was a Ukrainian-French socialite, heiress, interior designer, and art collector. She is best known as the long-time mistress of American millionaire J. Paul Getty, with whom she lived at Sutton Place. When Getty died in 1976, she received the second-largest inheritance out of all of his mistresses. She was married to the Parisian socialite Lucien Teissier, with whom she owned the Villa San Michele in Tuscany. Through her mother, Teissier was a morganatic descendant of Emperor Alexander II and Empress Maria Alexandrovna of Russia.

== Early life and family ==
Teissier was born Maria Petrovna Perevostchikova in Odessa in 1917 to Petr Ghika-Perevostchikov and Countess Elizabeta Alexeevna Belevskya-Zhukovskya. Teissier's parents later divorced and her mother married the painter Arthur Lourié.

Through her mother, Teissier was a morganatic descendant of the House of Romanov and related to multiple Russian and German noble families. Teissier's maternal grandparents were Count Aleksey Belevsky-Zhukovsky, a second cousin of Tsar Nicholas II, and Princess Maria Petrovna Troubetskaya. She was a great-granddaughter of Grand Duke Alexei Alexandrovich of Russia, the son of Tsar Alexander II and Princess Marie of Hesse and by Rhine, and his mistress Alexandra Zhukovskaya, Baroness of Seggiano, the daughter of Vasily Zhukovsky and Elizabeth von Reutern (daughter of Gerhardt Wilhelm von Reutern).

== Married life ==
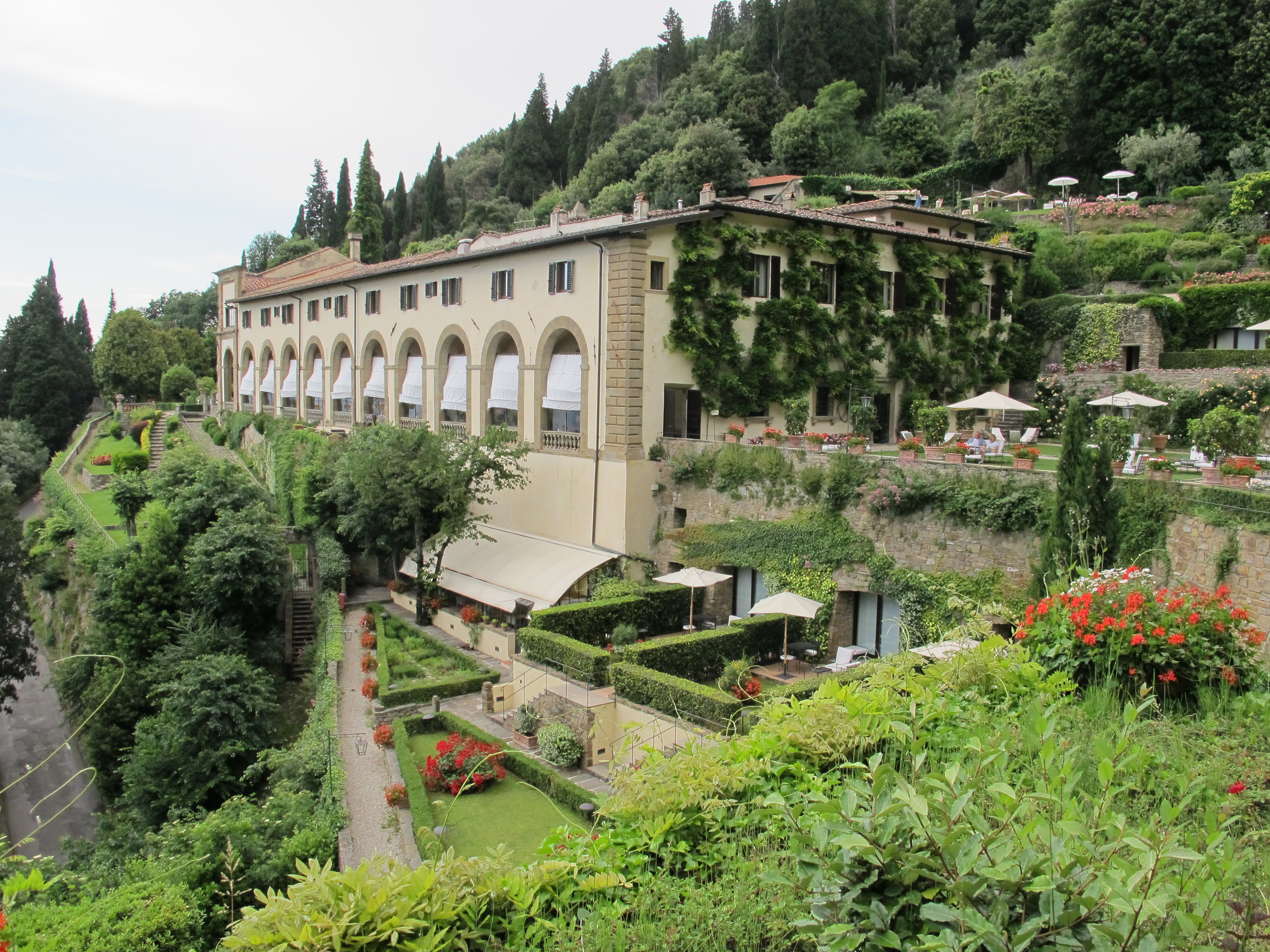
The Villa San Michele, Teissier's residence near Florence

She married Parisian socialite Lucien Teissier in Paris in May 1944. They had two children, Alexis (born 1946) and Marie Beatrice (born 1950). She and her husband owned a summer residence in Versailles and, in 1950, they purchased the Villa San Michele in Fiesole. Her husband transformed their Italian villa into a luxury boutique hotel. An art expert and interior designer, she kept a large art collection at the villa. The Teissiers later divorced.

=== Affair with J. Paul Getty ===
When she was thirty-six years old, Teissier was introduced to J. Paul Getty by their mutual friend Paul-Louis Weiller. Getty was a frequent guest of Teissier's at the Villa San Michele, particularly in between trips to Milan and Naples. It was during this time, around 1960, that the two began their longstanding affair. Getty's courtship of Teissier took longer than his previous affairs, as she was married, and she was reportedly jealous of Getty's other affairs. The two attended many society events together, including the Hotel Café Royal's 100th anniversary party on 11 February 1965.

When Getty invited British interior designer Penelope Ann Kitson to stay at Sutton Place, Teissier and Getty's other live-in mistresses, Rosabella Burch and Lady Ursula d'Abo, were infuriated. Both Teissier and Lady Ursula claimed to be Getty's "one true love" and Teissier had been the one to initially convince Getty to purchase the manor house. When Getty died in 1976, Teissier was listed alongside Lady Ursula, Kitson, Burch, Countess Marianne von Alvensleben, Karin Mannhardt, Hildegard Kuhn, Gloria Bigelow, Mary Maginnis, and Belene Clifford in his will. She received the second-largest inheritance from Getty, after Kitson, which included 2,500 shares of Getty Oil, valued at $413,125, and a $750 monthly allowance for the remainder of her life.

She died in Châteauneuf-Grasse on 1 August 1990.
