= Aleksey Belevsky-Zhukovsky =

Russian noble (1871–c. 1931)

- Baron of Seggiano
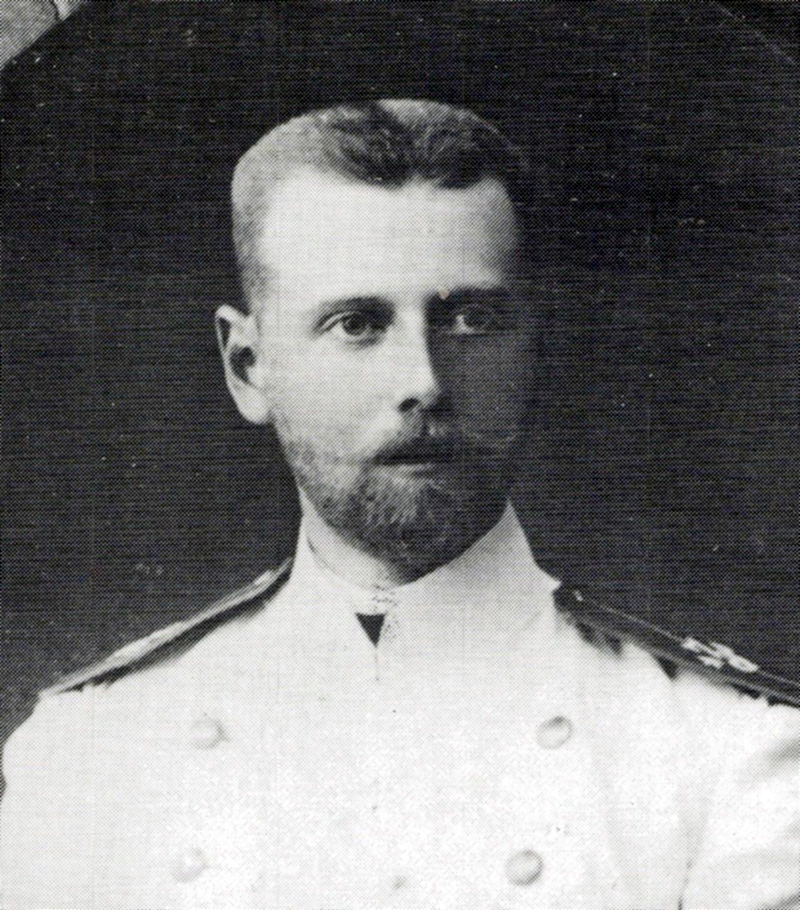
- Alexei c. 1890s
- Born: 26 November 1871; Salzburg, Salzburg, Austria-Hungary
- Died: 1930 or 1932; The Caucasus, Transcaucasian Socialist Federative Soviet Republic, Soviet Union
- Cause of death: Execution
- Noble family: Belevsky-Zhukovsky
- Spouses: Princess Maria Petrovna Troubetskaya; Princess Maria Petrovna Troubetskaya
- Issue Detail: Princess Maria Petrovna Troubetskaya; Countess Alexandra Alexeevna; Countess Maria Alexeevna; Count Sergei Alexeevich
- Father: Grand Duke Alexei Alexandrovich of Russia
- Mother: Alexandra Zhukovskaya

Count Alexei Alexeevich Belyovsky-Zhukovsky (Russian: Алексей Алексеевич Белёвский-Жуковский; 26 November 1871 – 1930 or 1932) was the son of Grand Duke Alexei Alexandrovich of Russia and Alexandra Vasilievna, Baroness Seggiano and a grandson of both Alexander II of Russia and the poet Vasily Zhukovsky.

== Birth ==
Alexei Alexeevich was born to Grand Duke Alexei Alexandrovich of Russia, the son of Czar Alexander II of Russia, and Alexandra Vasilievna Zhukovskaya. His maternal grandfather was the poet Vasily Zhukovsky, who was the illegitimate son of a landowner named Afanasi Bunin and his Turkish housekeeper Salkha.

== Controversy ==
It is still rumoured that Alexei's parents married, however that has never been proven. But even if they were married, the marriage was morganatic, because Alexandra was born a "commoner," and not of a royal or formerly sovereign family. When Alexei was born in Salzburg, he was known by his mother's family name. While his father tried to get a Russian title for his son, the Emperor Alexander II refused. However he managed to get a title for mother and son from the Republic of San Marino: on 24. March 1875 they were granted the title Baron Seggiano. Alexandra married the same year the Baron Christian-Henrich von Wohrmann. This might be taken as an indication that there was no marriage to the Grand Duke as she could have done so only after a divorce. No records exist of such a divorce.

Only after Alexander II had been murdered and Alexander III had become Emperor, the Grand Duke succeed to have his son created a Count. The title granted was on 21. March 1884 was Count Belevsky. The name was chosen from the village of Belyov in the province of Toula where his grandfather poet was born. In 1913 he was granted the right to add his grandfather's family name to his title just becoming Count Belevsky-Zhukovsky.

== Marriage ==
Count Alexei married, on 29 August 1894 in Ilyinskoye manor, Princess Maria Petrovna Troubetskaya (18 June 1872 Russia – 20 March 1954 Paris), the daughter of Prince Petr Troubetskoy. As Ilyinskoye was the property of his uncle the Grand Duke Sergei, Governor of Moscow, it can be taken as a sign that he was quite accepted in Imperial circles (and he served as Serge's orderly since 1904).

The marriage did not last and Alexis remarried. His second wife was Baroness Natalia von Schoeppingk.

== Children ==
Count Alexei and Princess Maria had four children:

- Countess Elizabeta Alexeevna Belevskya-Zhukovskya (8 September 1896 Moscow – 30 July 1975 New Jersey) married Petr Ghika-Perevostchikov (1872–1937) and had two children, including Mary Teissier.
- Countess Alexandra Alexeevna Belevskya-Zhukovskya (b. 4 March 1899 Moscow – 1995) married twice and had no children.
- Countess Mariya Alexeevna Belevskya-Zhukovskya (b. 26 October 1901 Moscow - 18 August 1996 Cormeilles-en-Parisis) married in 1922 Wladimir Sverbeev (1892–1951) and had one daughter.
- Count Sergei Alexeevich Belevsky-Zhukovsky (17 February 1903 Moscow – 27 November 1956 Los Angeles) married in 1926 Nina Botkine (1901–1966) and had one daughter.

== Death ==
Count Alexei was killed by the Soviets in the Caucasus sometime in 1930 or 1932.

== Ancestry ==
Ancestors of Aleksey Belevsky-Zhukovsky

8. Nicholas I of Russia
4. Alexander II of Russia
9. Princess Charlotte of Prussia
2. Grand Duke Alexei Alexandrovich of Russia
10. Louis II, Grand Duke of Hesse and by Rhine
5. Princess Marie of Hesse and by Rhine
11. Princess Wilhelmine of Baden
1. Count Alexei Alexeevich Belevsky-Zhukovsky
12. Afanasi Ivanovich Bunin
6. Vasily Andreyevich Zhukovsky
13. Salkha
3. Alexandra Vasilievna Zhukovskaya
14. Gerhardt Wilhelm von Reutern
7. Elisabeth von Reutern
15. Charlotte von Shvertcell

== See also ==
- Branches of the Russian Imperial Family
