= Grand Duke Alexei Alexandrovich of Russia =

Russian prince and naval officer (1850–1908)

Grand Duke Alexei Alexandrovich
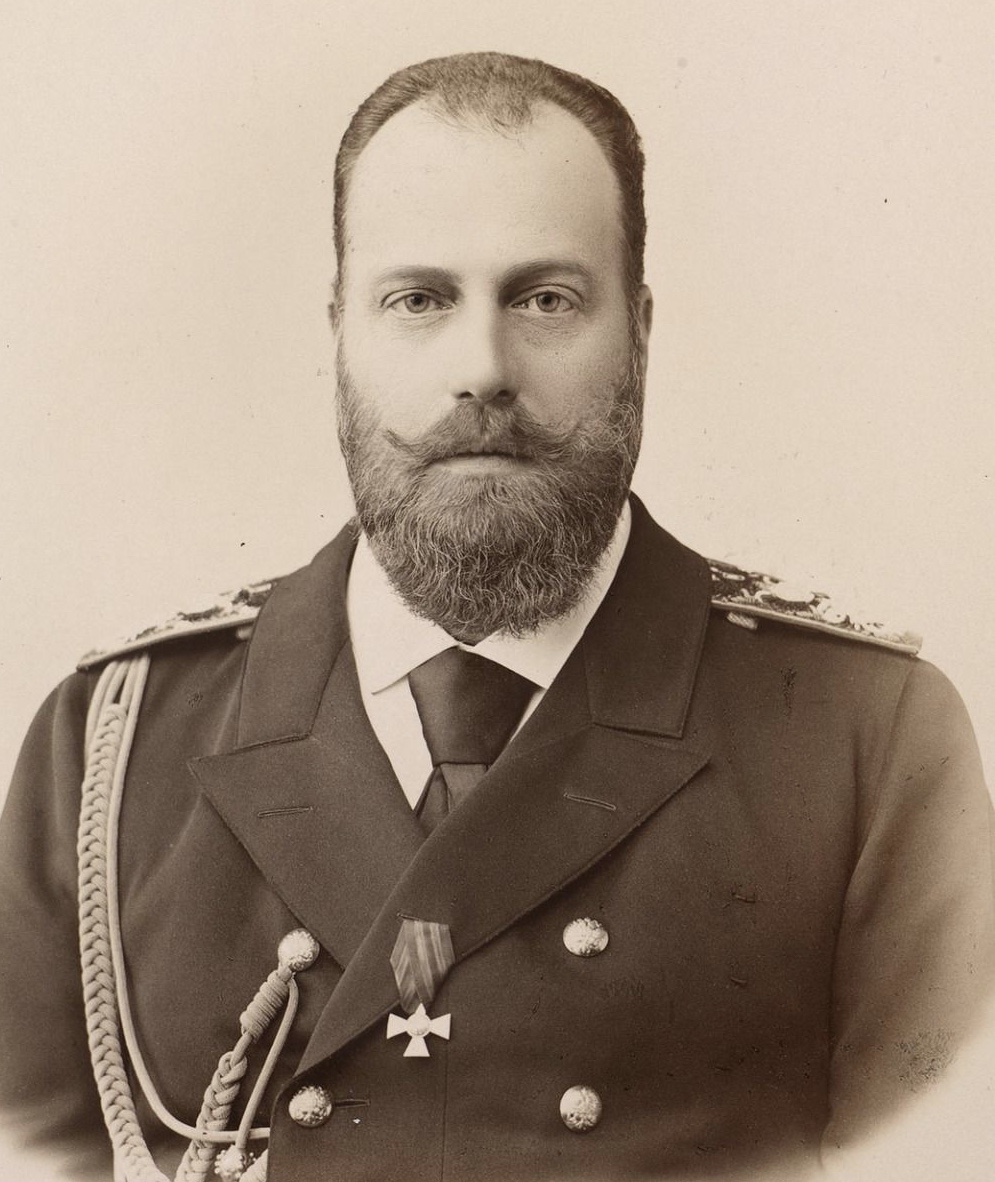
- Alexei Alexandrovich, c. 1880-90s
- Born: 14 January 1850; Winter Palace, Saint Petersburg, Russian Empire
- Died: 14 November 1908 (aged 58); Paris, France
- Burial: Grand Ducal Mausoleum
- Spouse: Alexandra Zhukovskaya
- Issue: Aleksey Belevsky-Zhukovsky
- House: Holstein-Gottorp-Romanov
- Father: Alexander II of Russia
- Mother: Marie of Hesse and by Rhine

Lesser coat of arms of the younger sons of the emperor of Russia

Grand Duke Alexei Alexandrovich of Russia (Алексе́й Алекса́ндрович; 14 January [O.S. 2 January] 1850 in St. Petersburg – 14 November 1908 in Paris) was the fifth child and the fourth son of Alexander II of Russia and his first wife Marie of Hesse and by Rhine. Chosen for a naval career, Alexei Alexandrovich started his military training at the age of seven. By the age of 20, he had been appointed lieutenant of the Imperial Russian Navy and had visited all Russia's European military ports. In 1871, he was sent as a goodwill ambassador to the United States and Japan.

In 1883, he was appointed general-admiral. He had a significant contribution in the equipment of the Russian navy with new ships and in modernizing the naval ports. However, after the Russian defeat in the Battle of Tsushima in 1905, he was relieved of his command. He was viewed at the time as an incompetent and corrupt dilettante. He died in Paris in 1908.

== Early life ==
Four brothers (from left to right: Alexander, Alexei, Vladimir and Tsarevich Nicholas) photo by Sergei Lvovich Levitsky

The Grand Duke Alexei Alexandrovich of Russia was born in Saint Petersburg on 14 January 1850 (4 January O.S.). He was the son of emperor Alexander II and empress Maria Alexandrovna. He was a younger brother of Grand Duchess Alexandra Alexandrovna, Tsarevich Nikolay Alexandrovich, Alexander III of Russia, Grand Duke Vladmir Alexandrovich. He was an older brother of Duchess Maria of Saxe-Coburg and Gotha, Grand Duke Sergei Alexandrovich and Grand Duke Paul Alexandrovich.

Alexei was chosen for a naval career since his childhood. At the age of 7 he received the rank of midshipman. The next year Konstantin Nikolayevich Posyet was appointed as his tutor. While the winters were dedicated to theoretical studies, during the summers he trained on Russian warships of the Baltic fleet stationed in Saint Petersburg harbour. Training exposed him to various sailing ships:

- in 1860 the yacht Shtandart on a cruise from Petergof to Livada
- in 1861–1863 the yacht Zabava under the flag of Counter-Admiral Posyet in the Gulf of Finland and Gulf of Bothnia,
- in 1864 the frigate Svetlana in the Gulf of Finland and the Baltic Sea
- in 1866 the frigate Oslyabya during an extensive training cruise to the Azore Islands.

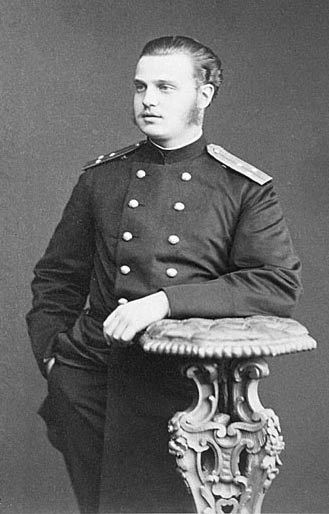
Grand Duke Alexei Alexandrovich in his youth, photo by Sergei Lvovich Levitsky

On 18 September 1866 Alexei was promoted to lieutenant. He continued his navy career serving as officer aboard the frigate Alexander Nevsky on a cruise across the Mediterranean to Piraeus, where he attended the wedding of his cousin Olga Konstantinovna.

In 1868 he went on a trip to southern Russia traveling by train from Saint Petersburg to Nikolayevsk, continuing by ship down the Volga to Astrakhan. He then boarded a military ship for a cruise on the Caspian Sea to Baku, [Petrovsk (now Makhachkala) and then to Iran. He then crossed the Caucasus and reached Poti where the Alexander Nevsky was moored. From there he sailed to Constantinople, Athens and the Azore Islands On the return voyage, the frigate was wrecked off the coast of Jutland during a storm on the North Sea. Though the ship was lost, all but five crew members were unhurt and safely reached shore.

In January 1870 Alexei Alexandrovich reached the age of majority according to Russian legislation. The event was marked by taking two oaths : the military one and the oath of allegiance of the Grand Dukes of the Russian Imperial House. In June 1870 Alexei started the last part of his training. This included inland navigation on a cutter with a steam engine, on the route from Saint Petersburg to Arkhangelsk through the Mariinsk Canal system and the Northern Dvina. After visiting the schools and industrial facilities of Arkhangelsk, he started his navigation training in arctic conditions, aboard the corvette Varyag. This cruise took him to the Solovetsky Islands, continuing through the White Sea and Barents Sea to Novaya Zemlya. The route continued to Kola Bay and the city of Murmansk, the ports of northern Norway and Iceland. He returned to Cronstadt at the end of September.

== Love affair with Alexandra Zhukovskaya ==
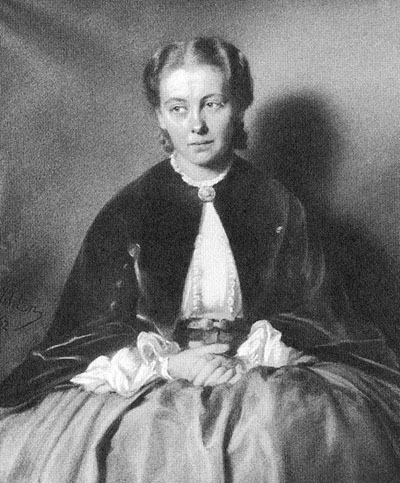
Alexandra Zhukovskaya

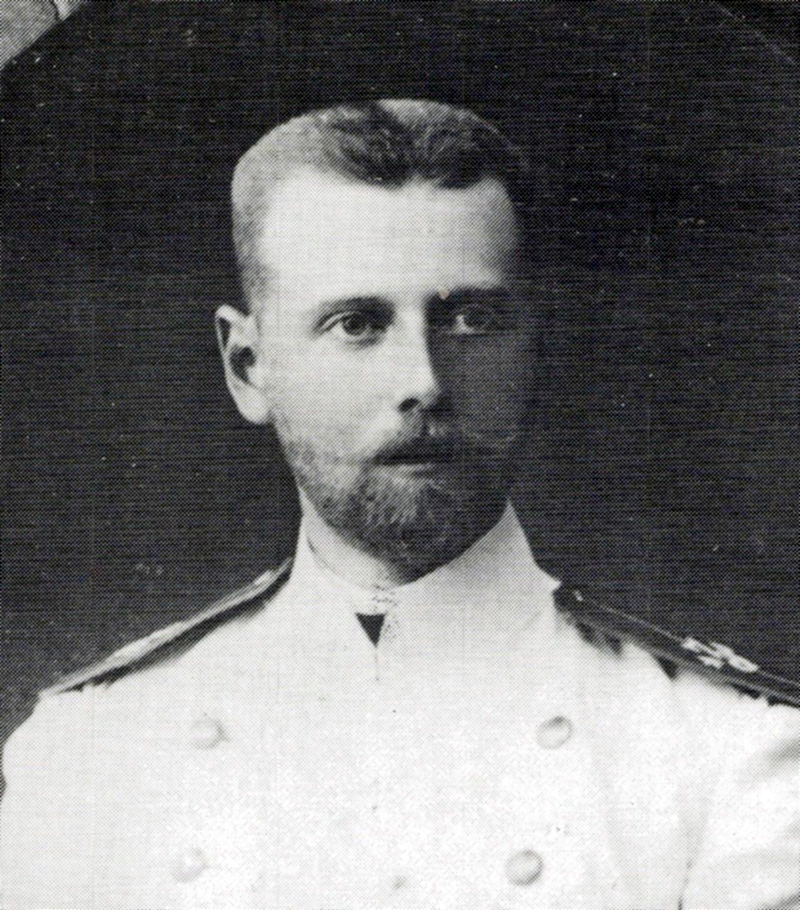
Count Alexey Alexeevich Belevskiy-Zhukovskiy 1871–1931

In 1869/1870, Alexei had an affair with Alexandra Zhukovskaya, daughter of poet Vasily Andreyevich Zhukovsky, who was eight years older than he was. They had a son, Alexei, born on 26 November 1871. Tsar Alexander II was strongly opposed to this relationship.

Some historians claim that they were morganatically married and that the marriage was annulled by the Russian Orthodox Church, because, according to the "Fundamental Laws of the Imperial House", this marriage was illegal. However, articles 183 and 188, which prohibited marriages without the consent of the emperor, were included in the Fundamental Laws only by the 1887 revision under Tsar Alexander III. The rules valid in 1870 did not prohibit morganatic marriages, but simply excluded their offspring from the succession to the throne. There is no evidence either to the marriage or to the divorce. There is also no evidence that Alexei even requested the permission to marry. As Alexandra Zhukovskaya was not an aristocrat and, besides, the daughter of an illegitimate son of a Russian landowner and a Turkish slave, such a marriage would have been unthinkable.

Upset by his son's affair, Alexander II even refused to grant Alexandra Zhukovskaya a title, which would have officially recognized the Grand Duke's paternity, even if illegitimate. Other European courts also refused to grant her a title. As a solution of last resort, on 25 March 1875 Alexandra was able to secure the title of Baroness Seggiano from the Republic of San Marino, with the right to transmit the title to her son and his firstborn male descendants. It was only in 1883, that Alexander III, Alexei's elder brother, granted the Baron Seggiano the title of Count Belevsky, and in 1893 approved his coat of arms.

== Overseas tours ==
=== United States ===
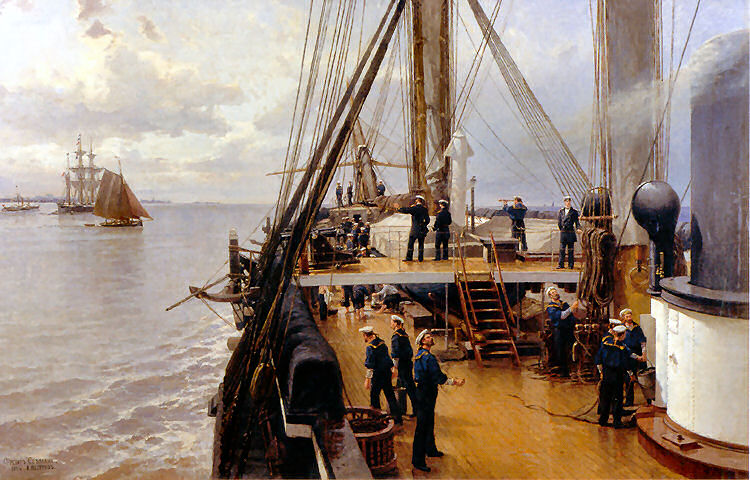
On board the frigate Svetlana

==== Voyage ====
After the official visit to Saint Petersburg of an American squadron under the command of Admiral David Farragut in 1867, a high level visit of the Russian Navy was envisaged by the Russian Government. After lengthy negotiations, it was decided that the Russian delegation would be headed by the Grand Duke. The official announcement of the visit was made on 29 June 1871 by Nikolay Karlovich Krabbe, Minister of the Imperial Russian Navy.

The Russian squadron, under the command of Admiral Konstantin Nikolayevich Posyet on board the frigate Bogatyr, included the frigates Svetlana and General-Admiral, the corvette Russian corvette Ignatiev and the gunboat Russian frigate Abrek. Alexei was serving as lieutenant aboard the Svetlana. Before reaching the United States, the Russian squadron was to be met by the frigate Vsadnik of the Russian Pacific Fleet. Though all ships were equipped with steam engines, the squadron made the passage to America mainly under sail, so as to avoid making port on the route for coal supplies. In addition to Alexei's personal staff, the crew included 200 officers and over 3000 sailors. The squadron set sail out of Kronstadt on 20 August 1871.

The squadron first stopped in Copenhagen, where he paid a visit to King Christian IX of Denmark. In the English Channel the Russians were met by a squadron of the Royal Navy and escorted to Plymouth, where Alexei was met by the Duke of Edinburgh Alfred of Saxe-Coburg. A visit to Balmoral Castle had been scheduled, but had to be canceled because the Prince of Wales was very sick and Queen Victoria extremely concerned. The Russian squadron set sail from Plymouth on 26 September, and, en route to New York, stopped for a few days in Funchal (Madeira Islands), leaving on 9 October.

The Russian squadron was met by an American squadron under the command of Vice-Admiral Stephen Clegg Rowan, Port Admiral of New York, hoisting his flag on the frigate USS Congress. Admiral Samuel Phillips Lee, commander of the North Atlantic Squadron attended on his own flagship, the USS Severn. The other ships of the squadron were the USS Iroquois and the USS Kansas, attended by several tugs.

A welcoming committee had been formed in New York, chaired by William Henry Aspinwall. Among the members of the committee were Moses H. Grinnell, General Irwin McDowell, Theodore Roosevelt Sr. Rear-Admiral S. W. Godon, John Taylor Johnston, Albert Bierstadt, Lloyd Aspinwall and others. After a short delay due to the weather, the Russian squadron anchored in New York Harbor on 21 November 1871, where the Grand Duke was greeted by general John Adams Dix. A military parade took place in the city. Alexei then attended a thanksgiving service at the Russian chapel.

==== Reception by President Grant ====
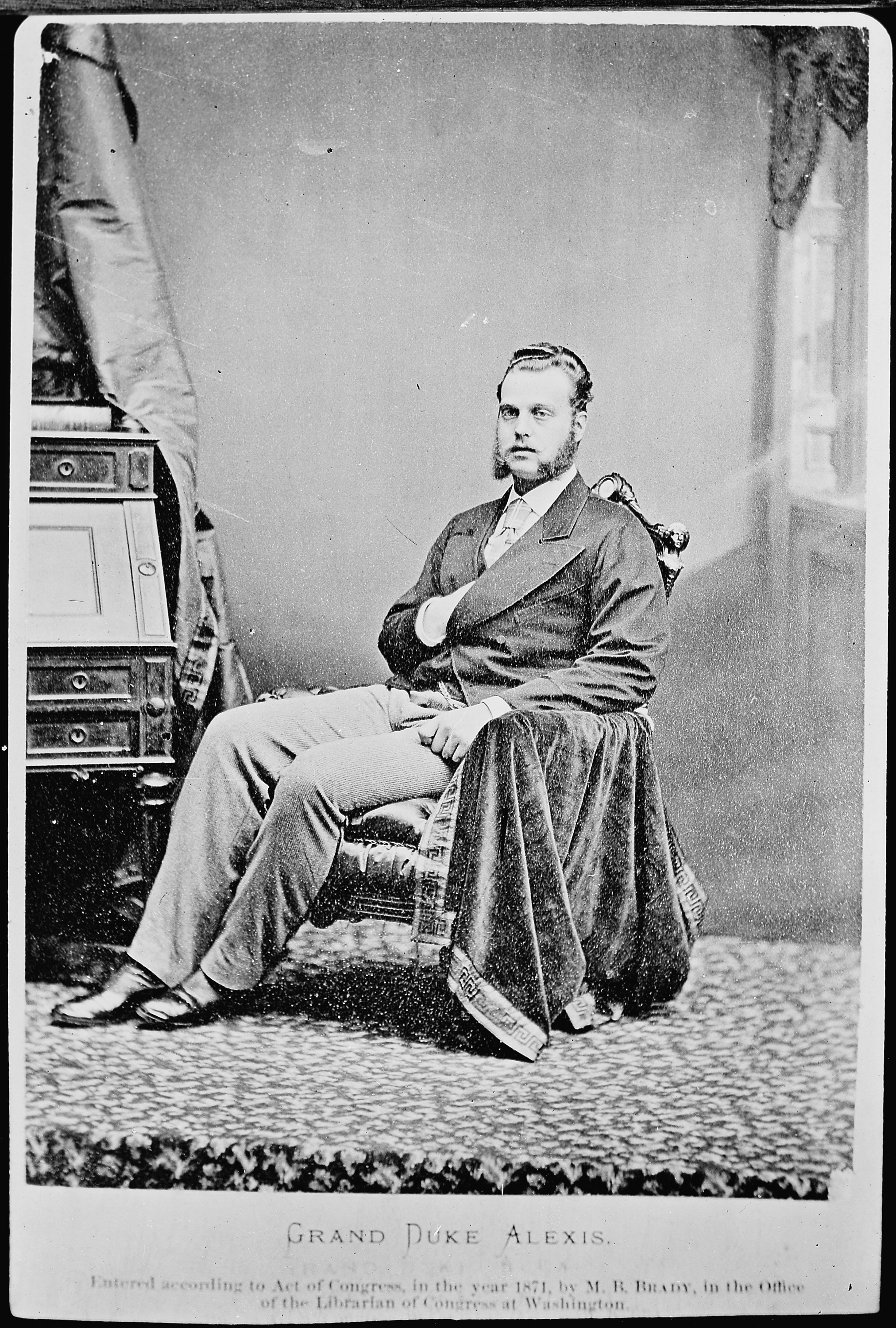
Photo by Mathew Brady

On 22 November 1871, Alexei left for Washington, D.C. by special train, placed at his disposal by the New Jersey Railroad and Transportation Company. The train had three cars: the "Commissariat" having all the modern improvements of a hotel, comprising store-rooms and pantry, the "Ruby", dining room car to accommodate 28 persons, with kitchen, ice boxes, and a sort of wine cellar, and the "Kearsarge", used as sitting, sleeping and reading room.

On 23 November, he was received by president Ulysses S. Grant. The president's wife, Julia Grant, and his daughter, Nellie Grant, also attended. Most of the members of the cabinet were present at the meeting: Hamilton Fish (United States Secretary of State), Columbus Delano (United States Secretary of the Interior) with his wife, Amos Tappan Akerman (United States Attorney General) with his wife, George S. Boutwell (United States Secretary of the Treasury), George Maxwell Robeson (United States Secretary of the Navy), General Frederick Tracy Dent (the president's brother-in-law and military secretary), John Creswell (Postmaster General of the United States), as well as generals Horace Porter and Orville E. Babcock.

The visit to Washington was overshadowed by President Grant's discontent caused by the Russian government's refusal to recall Konstantin Katacazi, minister plenipotentiary of Russia to the United States. The entire visit in Washington lasted only one day. No formal entertainment was given in Washington to the Grand Duke, though for all other visits of members of royal families to the White House, formal dinners had been organized. Such dinners had taken place when President John Tyler received François d'Orléans, prince de Joinville, when Abraham Lincoln received Prince Napoleon Joseph Bonaparte and even when Ulysses Grant received Kamehameha V, king of the Sandwich Islands. The evening of the visit to the White House, Alexei and his suite dined at Minister Katakazi's residence, the only American official attending being General Porter. At his departure Alexei was asked if he intended to return to Washington. Though he expressed his interest to return during a session of Congress, the uneasy diplomatic relations due to Minister Katakazi prevented this from happening. There had also been expectations that a military alliance treaty between the United States and Russia would be signed during the meeting; however this was not the case.

The next day, Alexei left by train for Annapolis where he visited the Naval Academy, thereafter returning to New York.

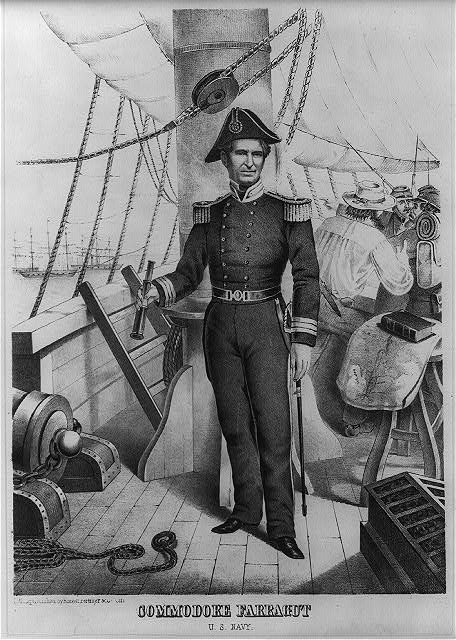
Farragut in the shrouds of the USS Hartford at the battle of Mobile Bay. Print after the painting by William Page, presented to Grand Duke Alexei as a gift for Tsar Alexander II

==== East Coast ====
In New York, he visited the Brooklyn Navy Yard, Fort Wadsworth and the fortifications on Governors Island. He also reviewed the Fire Department at Tompkins Square. A highlight was the trip by steamer on the Hudson for the visit of the United States Military Academy, West Point.

Several balls were organized in his honor, the most important being the grand balls at the Navy Yard and at the Academy of Music. Alexei attended opera performances of Faust and Mignon at the Academy of Music. He also went on a shopping spree, stopping at the A.T. Stewart and Tiffany stores where he bought some jewellery and bronze statues.

On 2 December 1871, a ceremony took place at the National Academy of Design, where the Grand Duke was received by Samuel F. B. Morse, William Stoddard, William Page, Albert Bierstadt and several other artists. The painting Farragut in the shrouds of the Hartfort at the battle of Mobile Bay by William Page was handed over as a gift of the citizens of New York for Tsar Alexander II. General John Adams Dix presented the picture and the accompanying scroll, with a brief address in which he expressed the hope that it would further cement the union that existed between the United States and Russia. The painting was placed on board the Russian flagship for transportation to Russia.

On 3 December 1871, Alexei left for Philadelphia where he was received by general George Meade and Admiral Turner. He visited Girard College, Baird Locomotive Works and the Navy Yard. He was particularly interested in the Methodist Fair at the Horticultural Hall, where the ladies presented him with an Afghan Hound.

On 6 December 1871, Alexei visited the Smith & Wesson factory in Springfield, Massachusetts and was presented with a fully engraved, carved pearl grip, cased Smith & Wesson Model 3 revolver. The gun and case cost the factory $400 but it was a worthwhile investment, as the company hoped for additional contracts. The Grand Duke proudly displayed his revolver as he toured the American Frontier and carried it on a buffalo hunt with the famous "Buffalo Bill" Cody.

From 7 to 14 December, he stopped in Boston where he stayed at the Revere House. The landau which President Lincoln rode during his visit to Boston, was used. He was officially welcomed at the City Hall and the State House. During his stay, he visited Harvard University and the suburb of Cambridge, Massachusetts as well as different public schools in the Boston area, being extensively briefed on the American education system. Other highlights were the battlefield of Bunker Hill and the visit to the shipyards of Charlestown, Massachusetts.

On December 12th, Alexei attended a performance of Henry VIII at Boston’s Globe Theatre, starring the famed actress Charlotte Cushman. Known for her powerful stage presence.

Alexei also attended a music festival where 1,200 school children composed the great choir. At the festival, a grand march of welcome, specially composed by Julius Eichberg and dedicated to "His Imperial Highness", was presented

A ball in honor of the Grand Duke took place at the Boston Theatre. The audit of the expenses shows that the cost of ball was $14,678.58 (equivalent of $750,000 today), with $8,916.29 being covered by the sale of the tickets and other receipts

==== Detour to Canada ====
On 17 December, Alexei left by train to Canada. He first stopped in Montreal, where he had breakfast with the mayor of the city, and then visited Lachine, Quebec. He then passed through Ottawa and Toronto, finally reaching Clifton Hill, Niagara Falls on 22 December 1871 by the Great Western Railway. On his way, the train stopped in Hamilton, Ontario where he received a telegram from Queen Victoria, notifying him that the Prince of Wales had recovered from his illness. From Clifton Hill the party left by sleighs for a visit to the Niagara Falls. After having dressed in oil-skinned suits for fishermen at sea, the party also went under the falls. He then crossed the Niagara River over a new suspension bridge and then visited the United States part of the falls.

==== Midwest ====
On 23 December 1871, Alexei left by train for Buffalo, New York, where he spent Christmas. On 26 December, he arrived in Cleveland where he visited the iron mills and other factories in Newburgh Heights, Ohio. He then reviewed the Cleveland Fire Department and visited the National Inventors’ Exhibition. He then stopped in Detroit on his way to Chicago, where he arrived on 30 December. The city was recovering from the great fire. Joseph Medill, mayor of Chicago, had written to the Grand Duke:

"We have but little to exhibit but the ruins and débris of a great and beautiful city and an undaunted people struggling with adversity to relieve their overwhelming misfortunes."

He visited the destroyed part of the city and was impressed by the rhythm of the reconstruction. He gave US$5,000 (equivalent to $250,000 today) in gold to the homeless people of Chicago. Alexei also visited the stockyards and a pork processing plant.

As the Tremont House Hotel had been burnt to the ground, he was accommodated in the New Tremont House which had opened on Michigan Avenue, where he was awarded the "Freedom of the City". On New Year's Day General Philip Sheridan initiated him into the American custom of making "New Year's calls upon the ladies". From 2 to 4 January he visited Milwaukee and on 5 January he arrived in St. Louis, Missouri, where he stayed for over a week.

In St. Louis, Alexei attended the burlesque show Blue Beard in which Lydia Thompson, a 36-year-old actress was singing a tune "If Ever I Cease to Love". It is claimed that he was fascinated both by the actress and the song. Supposedly, she had also sung the number privately for the duke during a rendezvous. Later, while in St. Louis, Alexei became particularly enamored of one of his dance partners, a lady called Sallie Shannon of Lawrence, Kansas.

Finally on 12 January he arrived in Omaha, Nebraska

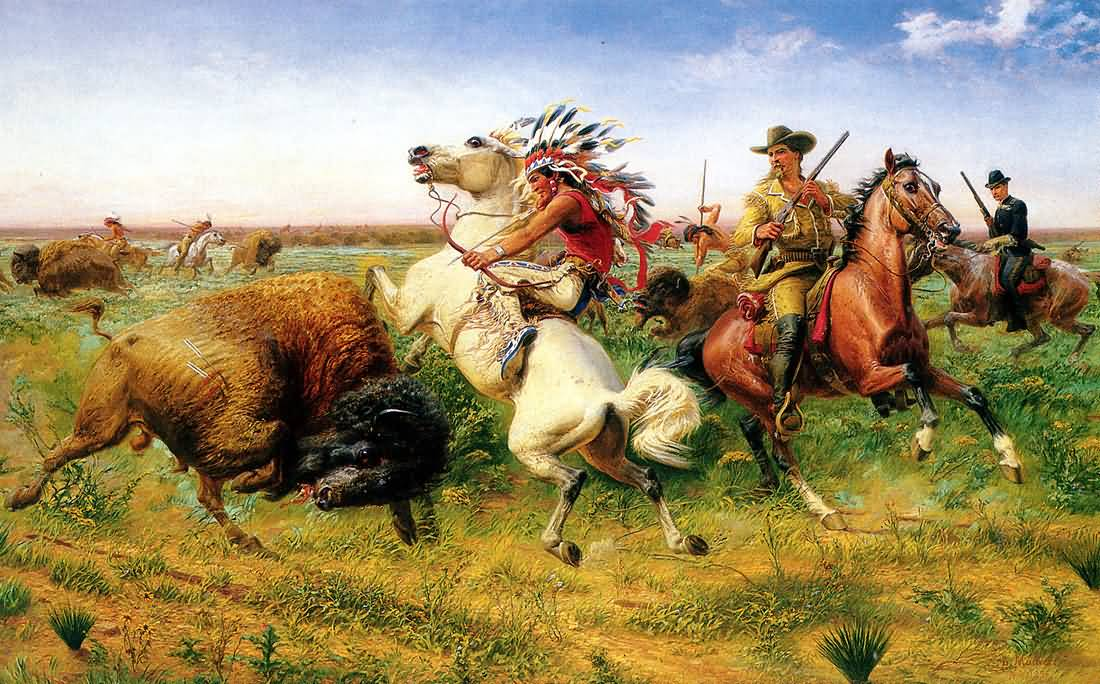
The Great Royal Buffalo Hunt Color print by Louis Maurer (1895)

==== Trip to the hunting grounds ====
Preparations for the hunt were extensive and had been carried out under the command of General Joel Palmer. Two companies of infantry in wagons, two companies of cavalry, the cavalry's regimental band, outriders, night herders, couriers, cooks had been mobilized for the event.

The Grand Duke in the company of General Philip Sheridan, General Edward Ord, and Lt. Colonel (Brevet Major General) George Armstrong Custer, the latter having been selected to be grand marshal of the hunt, arrived at Fort McPherson on 13 January 1872, by a special train provided by the Pennsylvania Railroad. They were greeted by an enthusiastic crowd, headed by Buffalo Bill. After speeches, party set out for the hunting grounds led by Buffalo Bill's partner Texas Jack Omohundro.

The Duke and General Sheridan rode in an open carriage, drawn by four horses. Buffalo Bill escorted the party with five ambulances, a light wagon for luggage, three wagons of "champagne and royal spirits" and fifteen to twenty extra saddle horses. The entire trip covered about 50 miles and took approximately eight hours.

The camp consisted of two hospital tents (used as dining tent), ten wall tents and tents for servants and soldiers. Three wall tents were floored and the Alexei's was carpeted with oriental rugs. Box stoves and Sibley stoves were provided for the tents.

Cody had discussed the hunt with Spotted Tail, chief of the Brulé Lakota, who had agreed to meet the "great chief from across the water who was coming there to visit him." About 600 warriors of different Sioux tribes, led by Spotted Tail, War Bonnet, Black Hat, Red Leaf, Whistler and Pawnee Killer, assembled to greet Alexei at the hunting camp. They had been provided with ten thousand rations of flour, sugar, coffee, and 1,000 pounds of tobacco for their trouble – twenty-five wagon loads in all.

At the start of the party, Spotted Tail, dressed in a suit, which didn't fit him, with an army belt upside down and an extremely awkward look was introduced to the Grand Duke. Then the Indian chief extended his hand, and greeted him in Lakota saying "How."

For the amusement of Alexei the Indians staged exercises of horsemanship, lance-throwing and bow-shooting. Then there was a sham fight, showing the Indian mode of warfare, closing up with a grand war dance. It was noticed that Alexei paid considerable attention to a good-looking Indian maiden. Concerned that his mother, Empress Maria Alexandrovna, might receive reports of his flirtations, he wrote her from St. Louis: "Regarding my success with American ladies about which so much is written in the newspapers, I can openly say, that this is complete nonsense. They looked on me from the beginning as they would look on a wild animal, as on a crocodile or other unusual beast.".

A dispute broke out, but Alexei was able to calm down the fight with gifts of red and green blankets, ivory-handled hunting knives and a large bag of silver dollars. A formal council took place in Sheridan's tent and a peace pipe was passed around. Spotted Tail seized the chance to press his demand for the right to hunt freely south of the Platte River and for more than one store in which to trade.

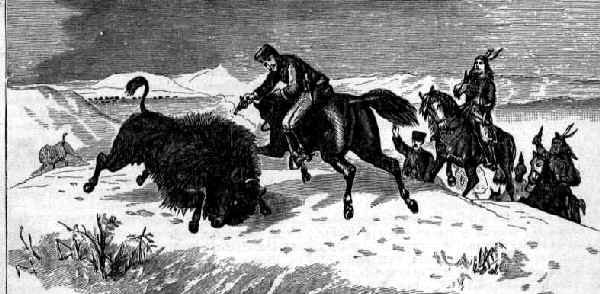
Grand Duke Alexei Alexandrovich killing a buffalo with a pistol shot on 15 January 1872

==== Buffalo hunt ====
The big hunt took place on Alexei's 22nd birthday, 14 January 1872. He carried a Russian hunting knife and an American revolver bearing the coats-of-arms of the United States and Russia on the handle, which he had recently received as a present. The hunting party approached buffalo herd several miles up the Red Willow Creek. Alexei rode Buffalo Bill's celebrated buffalo horse "Buckskin Joe", which had been trained to ride at full gallop with a target so that the best shot could be made. As soon as a herd of buffalo was seen, some two miles away, Alexei wanted to make a charge but was restrained by Bill. The party moved to the windward and gradually approached the herd. Within a hundred yards of the fleeing buffalo, Alexei, not accustomed to shooting from a running horse, fired, but missed. Buffalo Bill rode up close beside him, handed him his own famed .48-caliber rifle, "Lucretia", the one with which he claimed to have killed 4,200 buffalo, and advised him not to fire until he was on the flank of the buffalo. When Alexei tried again, he brought down his game. The hide of the dead buffalo was carefully removed and dressed; Alexei took it home as a souvenir of his hunt on the western plains. Twenty to thirty animals were killed on the first day of the hunt. The party returned early to camp, where there was a liberal supply of champagne and other beverages provided, and the evening was spent in frontier style.

The next morning Spotted Tail requested the Grand Duke to hunt by the side of Two Lance, chief of the Nakota Sioux tribe, so that he could see a demonstration of the Indian way of hunting. Coming up to a herd of buffalo, Two Lance demonstrated his skill by killing a large animal with one arrow which passed entirely through the body of the running buffalo. The arrow was preserved and given to Alexei. He killed two buffalo, one of them at 100 paces distance, with a pistol shot.

On the conclusion of the hunt, when returning to Fort McPherson, General Sheridan proposed that Buffalo Bill take the reins and show Alexei the old style of stage driving over the plains with the horses at full gallop. The heavy ambulance bounded over the rough prairie, while the occupants could hardly keep their seats. Alexei was pleased with his hunting trip. When he and Bill parted in Fort McPherson, Alexei presented him with a fur coat and expensive cuff links.

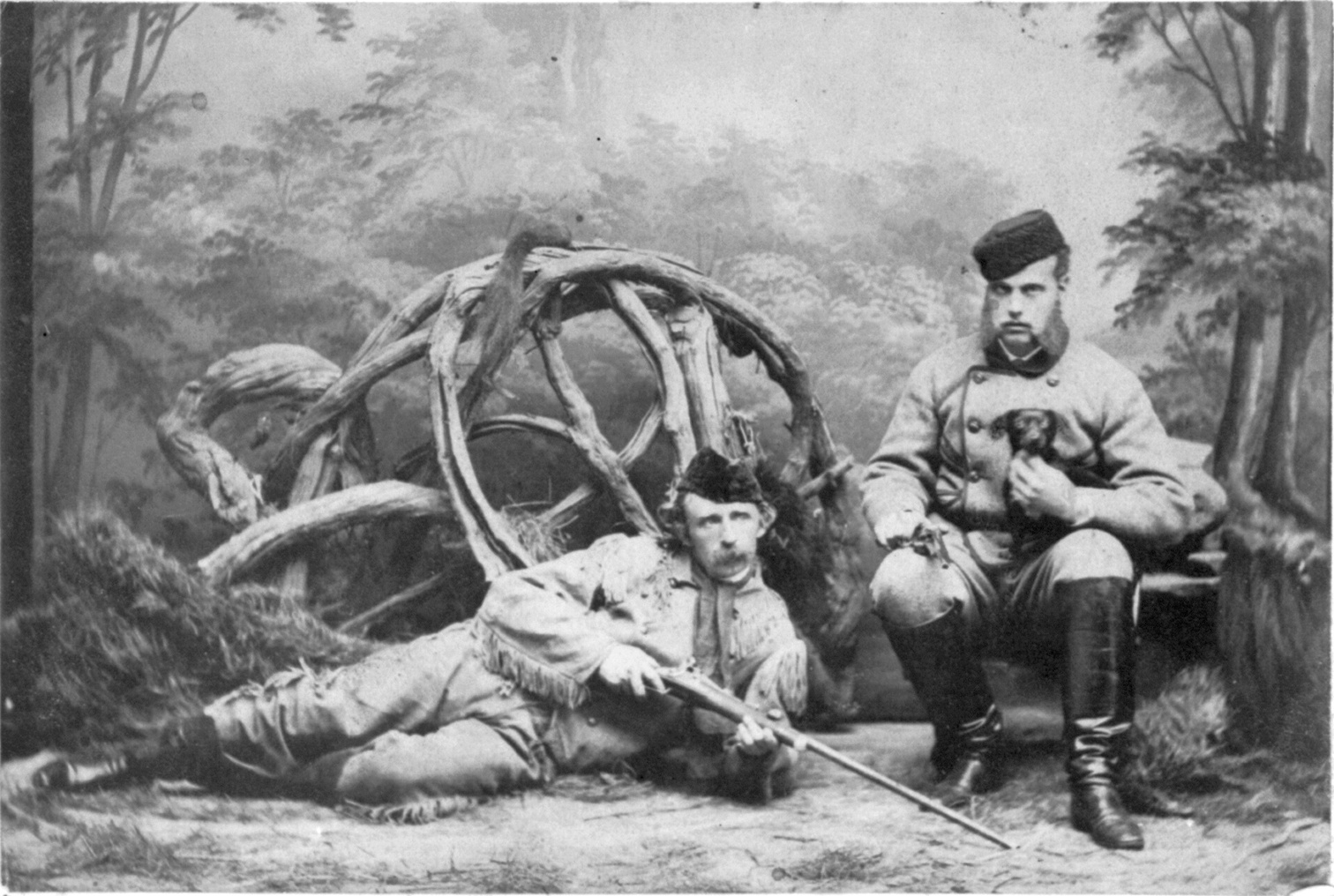
Grand Duke Alexei Alexandrovich and General George Armstrong Custer in Topeka, at the end of the buffalo hunt

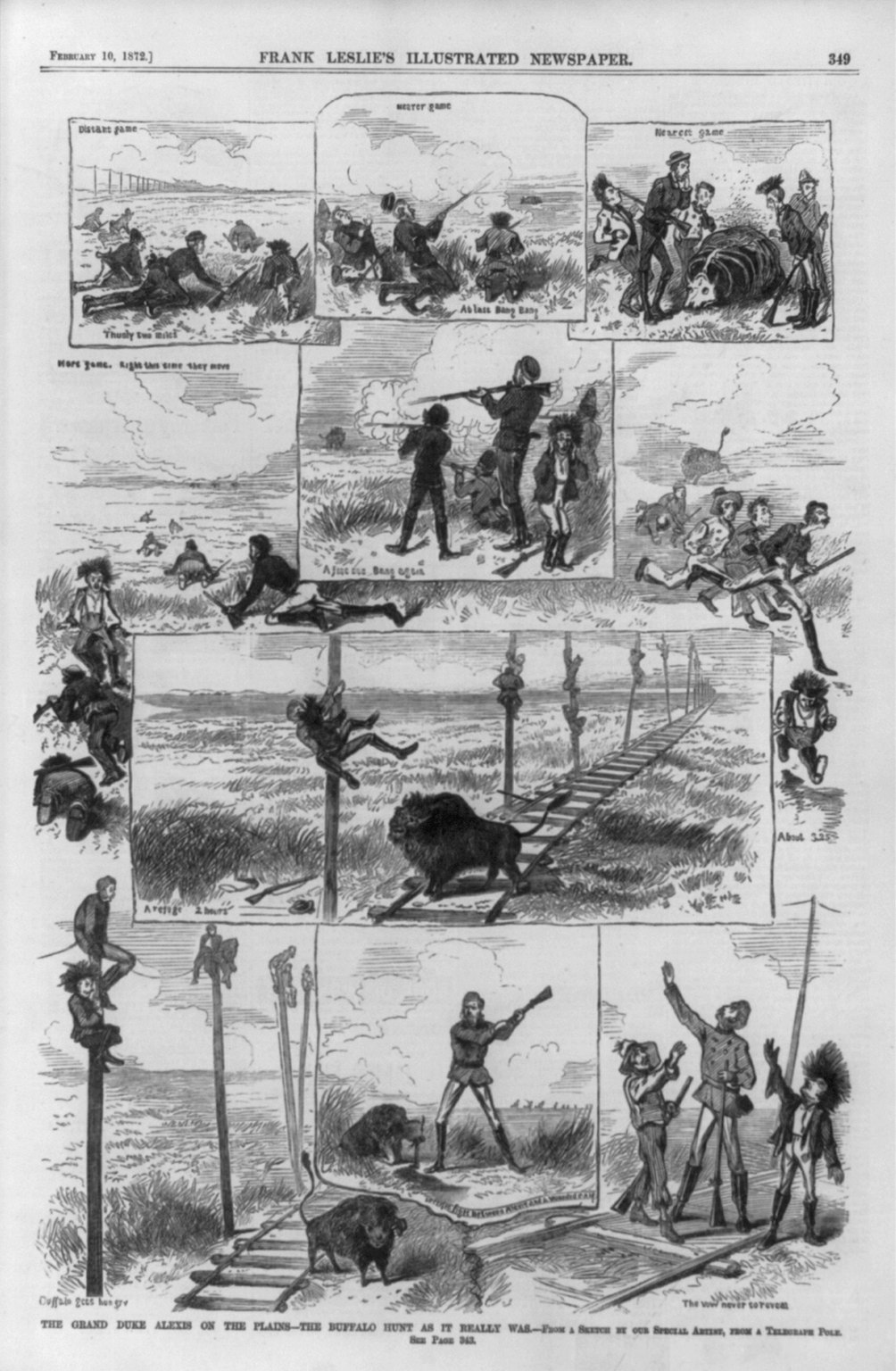
Newspaper caricature of the Grand Duke's buffalo hunt

From there the train continued to Denver where Alexei arrived on 17 January. While in Denver, he attended an honorary ball sponsored by the Pioneer Club and visited some mines. He apparently loved the new sport he had just learned and hunted buffalo again near Colorado Springs, on his return trip from Denver through Kansas to St. Louis. However, the horses used to hunt in eastern Colorado were cavalry mounts and unaccustomed to buffalo; several hunters were injured during the resulting confusion. Alexei was unhurt and succeeded in killing as many as 25 buffalo. He even shot a few more from the train on its way across western Kansas toward Topeka, which was reached on 22 January. It is claimed that, by the time they reached St. Louis, the party's supply of caviar and champagne had been exhausted.

General Custer became one of the Duke's best friends. He accompanied him and his entourage through Kansas, to St. Louis, New Orleans, and finally to Florida. They continued to correspond with one another up until Custer's death. In the United States, the hunt is remembered as "The Great Royal Buffalo Hunt". Starting from the year 2000, Hayes Center, Nebraska organizes each year the "Grand Duke Alexis Rendezvous" featuring a reenactment of the buffalo hunt.

Alexei received as a gift from chief Spotted Tail an Indian wigwam and a bow and arrows. He took them back to St. Petersburg. At present they are kept at the museum in Tver. In memory of his adventures in America, Alexei organized every year a special entertainment. The actors arrived to a village of tents in old carriages drawn by heavy horses. On the palace's lake there were "Indian" pirogues. Men with swords and tomahawks danced with women dressed in long old skirts. The performance was supposed to give the attendance an image of the American Old West.

==== Southern states ====
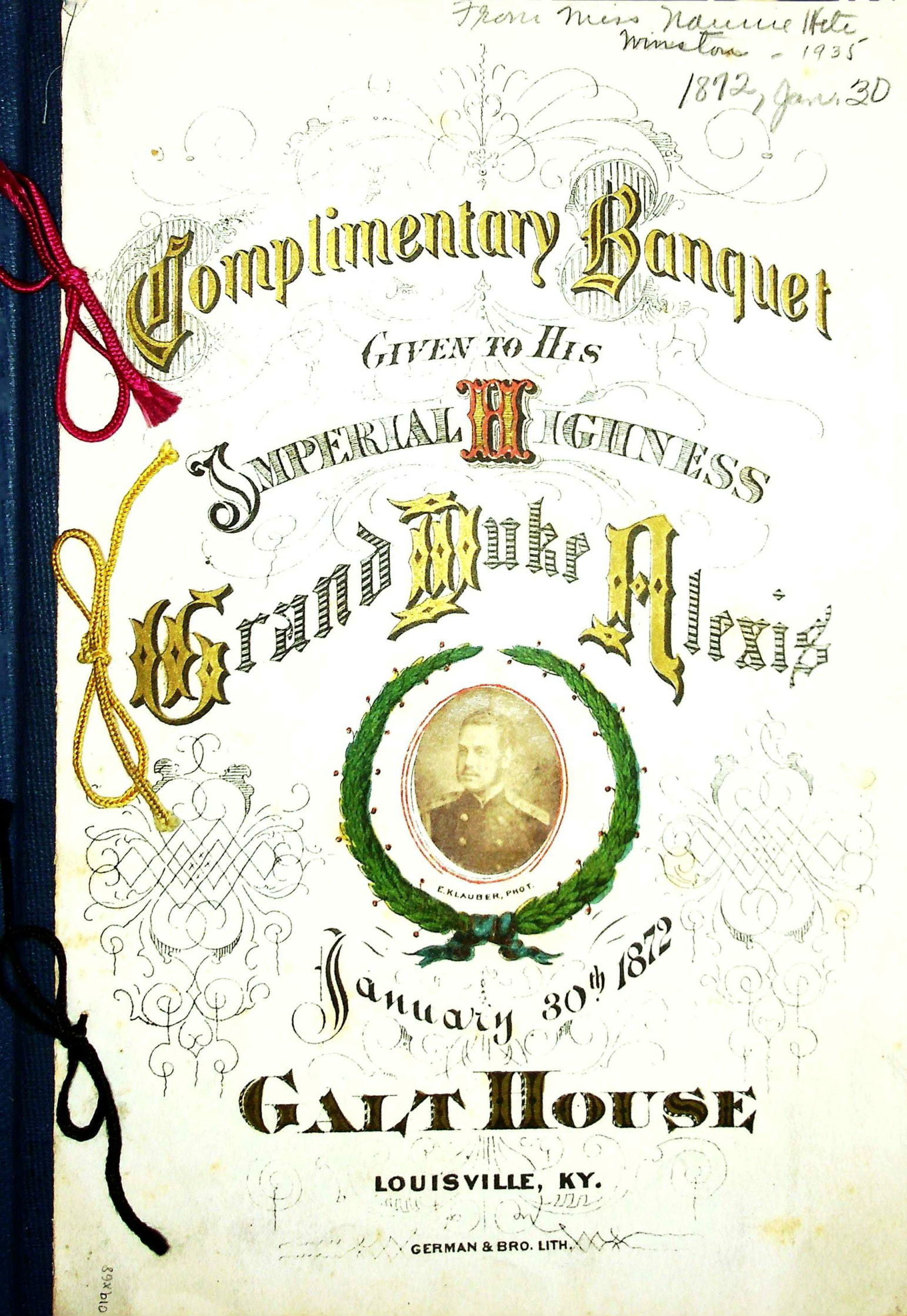
Menu for a Complimentary Banquet provided by the Galt House in Louisville, KY.

While in St. Louis, Alexei made a short visit to Cincinnati on 26 January. On 28 January he left by train for Louisville, Kentucky, where he visited the Mammoth Cave. He continued his trip by steamer, arriving on 2 February 1872 in Memphis, Tennessee aboard the Great Republic. After visiting the city he left on 8 February aboard the James Howard and after a stop in Vicksburg he finally arrived in New Orleans.

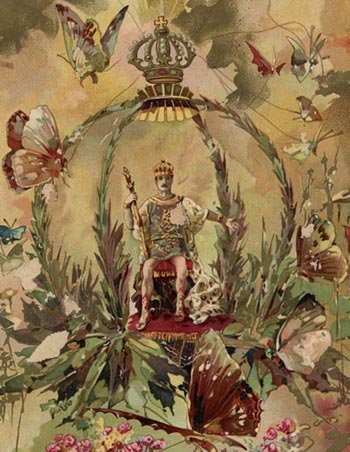
Detail from the invitation to the Rex carnival ball,1893

==== New Orleans ====
In New Orleans Alexei attended the 1872 Mardi Gras celebrations, where he was guest of honor reviewing the inaugural Rex parade.

There are many legends related to the Grand Duke's visit to New Orleans. It has been claimed that local business leaders had planned the first daytime parade to honor him, but this was not true. New Orleans was struggling to recover from the lingering effects of the Civil War. At the same time, many city leaders saw the need to bring some order to the chaotic street parades of Mardi Gras day. They had planned the parade all along and took the opportunity to capitalize on Alexei's visit. A new krewe of prominent citizens was formed, calling itself the School of Design, and its ruler was to be Rex (the organization is now known as the "Rex Organization"). The group of young men who founded the Rex Organization hoped not only to entertain the Grand Duke, but also to create a daytime parade that would be attractive and fun for the citizens of the city and their guests. They selected one of their members, Lewis J. Salomon, the organization's fund-raiser to be the first Rex, King of Carnival. Before he could begin his reign, he had to borrow a crown, scepter, and costume from Lawrence Barrett, a distinguished Shakespearean actor who was performing Richard III at the Varieties Theater.

At the same time, Lydia Thompson's tour had reached New Orleans and the Bluebeard burlesque was staged at the Academy of Music on St. Charles Avenue. Rumours of the courtship between Alexei and the actress had reached New Orleans and were amplified mainly to ensure a full house. Alexei had already seen the performance and didn't attend, hanging out at the Jockey Club. Besides, his preferences had shifted and he was captivated by the diminutive actress Lotta Crabtree who had one of the main roles in the play The Little Detective. Though the encounter was brief, Alexei sent her a gift in Memphis, her next stop after New Orleans.

Alexei attended the Rex parade. According to legend, the song "If Ever I Cease to Love", was chosen as anthem of the Rex parade, because it was claimed to be his favorite tune. Actually, the silly song had been written by George Leybourne and published in London in 1871. The song was already popular in New Orleans before the first Rex parade in 1872. the local adaptation of the lyrics was likely done local journalist E. C. Hancock whose newspaper had already published a spoof of the song in 1871. The lyrics of the song were adapted to the occasion and changed to:

"May the Grand Duke Alexis
Ride a buffalo in Texas
If Ever I Cease to Love"

The parade Alexei attended bears little resemblance to present day parades. Rex rode a horse, not a float and the parade that followed was made up largely of the informal maskers and marchers. There were however bands who stopped and played the Russian national anthem in honor of him. Many traditions such as the selection of Rex, the King of the Parade, the Rex anthem, the parade's colors date back to Alexei's visit.

The Russian fleet set sail from Pensacola, Florida of 22 February 1872. It is claimed that hundreds of pounds of iced buffalo meat were carefully stowed aboard.

While Libbie Custer, General Custer's wife, believed Alexei was more interested in "pretty girls and music" than the country he was passing through, Alexei did spend most of his time trying to get an understanding of the country.

=== Far East Tour ===
On its way home, the Russian squadron first stopped in Havana, Cuba, which it reached on 29 February 1872, before sailing on to Rio de Janeiro where it arrived on 3 June 1872. Alexei entertained Emperor Pedro II of Brazil and the imperial court aboard the Svetlana.

Sailing to the Far East, the squadron also stopped in Cape Town, Batavia, Singapore, Hong Kong, Canton and Shanghai

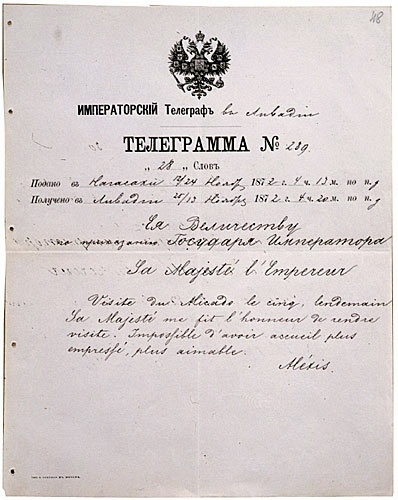
Telegram sent by Grand Duke Alexei Alexandrovich to Tsar Alexander II confirming the visit of the Japanese Emperor

Arriving in Japan on 15 October 1872, the Russian squadron cast anchor in Nagasaki harbour, where Alexei was greeted by the governor. The program included a ceremonial dinner in his honour, visits to the surrounding countryside and a tournament of the 60 best wrestlers of Japan. On 22 October Alexei and his staff visited the little village of Inasa where a Russian colony lived. The Russian delegation visited two hotels named "Kronstadt" and "Moscow" as well as the Russian cemetery.

The Russian squadron left Nagasaki on 24 October, the next port of call being Kobe, where he was again greeted by the provincial governor. Alexei also attended a performance at the local theatre in Kobe.

On 1 November, the Russian squadron set sail for Yokohama. On 5 November, the Grand Duke was officially received by Japanese Emperor Meiji and the following day, viewed a parade of the Japanese armed forces. After a few days, the Emperor, at Alexei's invitation, went to Yokohama to see the Russian squadron. Following his intervention, 34 Japanese Christians were pardoned by the Emperor and released.

On 26 November, the Russian squadron set sail for Vladivostok reaching the base of the Russian Pacific Fleet on 5 December nearly a year and a half after it had left Kronstadt. He then returned to St. Petersburg across Siberia.

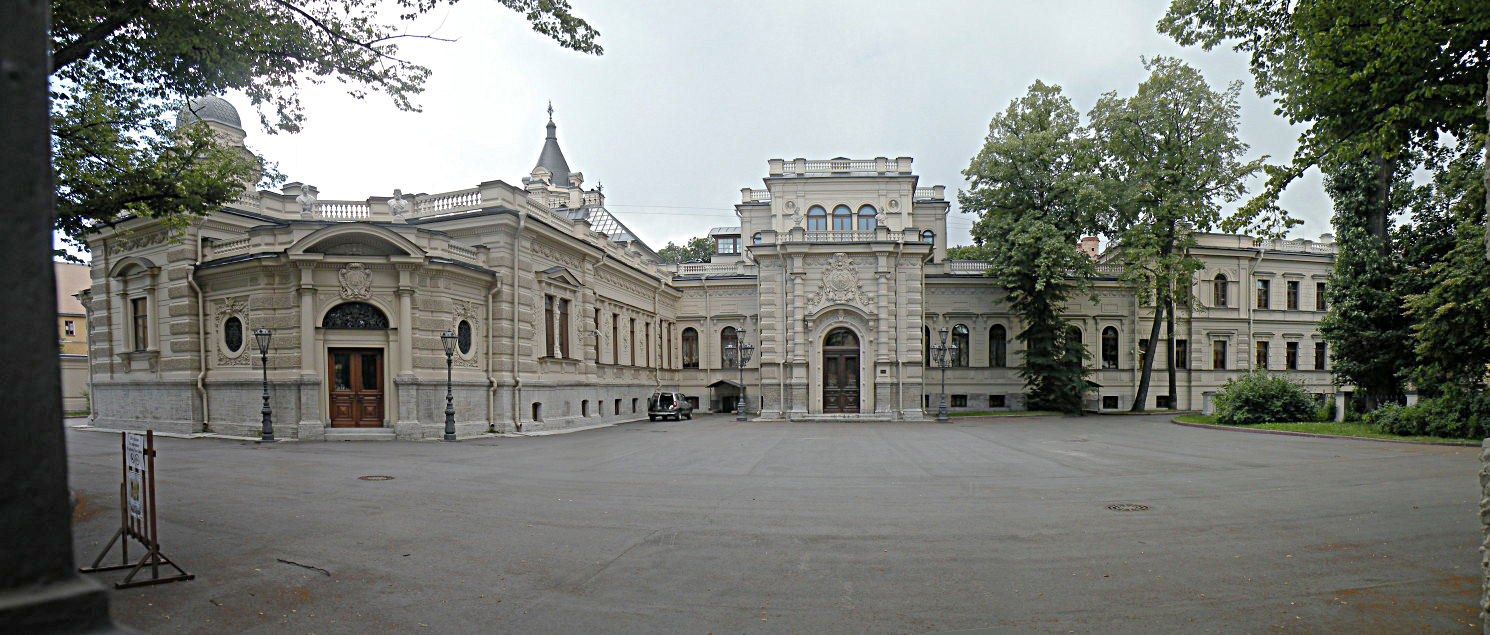
Palace of Grand Duke Alexei Alexandrovich on the Moika Embankment of Saint Petersburg

=== Visit to England ===
In 1874, Alexei accompanied his father to England to visit his sister, the Grand Duchess Marie Alexandrovna, recently married to Queen Victoria's son Prince Alfred.

== Palace of Grand Duke Alexei Alexandrovich ==
After his return from America, Alexei was concerned about an appropriate residence. He purchased an older building located at 122 Moika River Embankment in Saint Petersburg. The building was completely redesigned and rebuilt by architect Maximilian Messmacher having a total surface of 9,200 sq.m. It is considered one of the most interesting examples of Saint Petersburg's eclectic architecture. The architect used a different style for each façade. The wrought iron and stone fence surrounding the palace and its gardens is also an interesting feature. The central gates are still ornamented with the Grand Duke's monogram, the meaning of which was overlooked by the Soviet authorities. In 1910, part of the gardens were sold for the construction of a candy factory. Though the palace was declared a national landmark in 1968, it remained in disrepair for many years. After a restoration in the early 2000s, it was reopened in 2008 as the St. Petersburg Music House.

== Military career ==
Grand Duke Alexei Alexandrovich in the uniform of General-Admiral of Russia

In 1873, Alexei Alexandrovich was appointed head of the Imperial Naval Guards. He was also appointed member of the section for shipbuilding and naval artillery of the Russian Naval Technical Committee.

During the Russo-Turkish War (1877–1878), he was promoted to commander of the Russian Naval Forces on the Danube. On 9 January 1878, he was decorated with the Order of St. George – Fourth Degree for "tireless and successful management of the naval forces and equipment on 14 June 1877 for the construction and maintenance of the pontoon bridges and crossings at Zimnicea, Pietroşani and Nikopol and for the successful measures for protecting these crossing from destruction by enemy forces."

In 1880, he was promoted to general adjutant. In 1882, after the accession of his brother Alexander to the throne, Alexei was appointed head of the Naval Department, replacing Grand Duke Konstantin Nikolaievich. In 1883, he was also appointed General-Admiral of the Russian Imperial Fleet. Though his control over the day-to-day affairs of the military was limited, Alexei was involved in naval and military planning. His influence over the Tsar gave him a powerful say in strategic decision-making.

Besides being the head of Russia's fleets, Alexei was also in command of the naval cadet corps, the Moscow guard regiment, the 37th Ekaterinburg infantry regiment, the 77th Tenginsk infantry regiment, and the 17th Eastern Siberian infantry regiment.

As commander in chief of the navy, he was charged with modernization of the fleet, taking into account the rapid technological progress. During his tenure, he ensured a fivefold increase of the navy's budget. He was able to launch a series of pre-dreadnought battleships that were replacing the old ironclad ships. Thus, he was instrumental in the equipment of the Russian navy with several battleships of various classes:

- The Peresvet class, inspired by the British battleship HMS Centurion
- The Borodino class, based on a French design by the shipyards in La Seyne-sur-Mer
- The Petropavlovsk class designed at Galerniy Yard, St. Petersburg
- The Navarin class, on the British Trafalgar-class battleship

He also had older ironclads of the Imperator Aleksandr II class reconstructed by the French La Seyne yard. He also put new cruisers in service (among them the Aurora).

Alexei was instrumental in the modernization of the Russian navy. He reconstructed and developed the military harbours of Sevastopol, Alexander III in Livada (now Liepāja, Latvia) and Port Arthur, increased the number of navy yards and extended the dry-docks in Kronstadt, Vladivostok and Sevastopol. He also reorganized the navy, defining the conditions for different naval qualifications, drafting rules for rewarding long-time service of first and second rank ship captains, restructuring the corps of mechanical engineers and naval engineers, increasing the number of officers and crew.

When tensions mounted in the Far East, he ordered the transfer of additional ships to Port Arthur, including the battleship Petropavlovsk.

Russian academician and naval engineer Alexei Nikolaevich Krylov shows that, despite these achievements, there were severe drawbacks in the Grand Duke's activity. There was no strategic planning and ships were not built based on their intended role within the fleet. There were too many ships of different types. Ships were designed mainly by copying the ones of foreign navies and were therefore technologically 6–7 year old when they were launched. Their armour and equipment was often inadequate.

Alexei seems to have become aware of some these deficiencies. He decided to have more battleships of a single type and to have them designed abroad to meet the needs of the Russian navy. However, though he was an admirer of the British navy, the new battleships were conceived in France and had a poor design. The new Borodino-class battleships had tumblehome hulls and were unstable, having a high center of gravity. The drawbacks proved to be fatal for the Russian navy.

== Disgrace and dismissal ==
The Grand Duke's reputation as a corrupt, spendthrift dilettante, who lavished fortunes on "ladies of no reputation", had worsened throughout the years. Having purchased a magnificent mansion in Paris, he built a new wing of his St Petersburg palace for his mistress, ballerina Elizabeth Balletta. According to Kaiser Wilhelm II, no ship in the Russian Fleet could be purchased "without the Grand Duke Alexis, the Commander-in-Chief of the Fleet, pocketing a quarter of a million roubles". In 1903, thirty million roubles – half of the budget of the Russian navy – had disappeared without a single new ship being launched. The Grand Duke was suspected of being involved in the misappropriation.

At the outbreak of the Russo-Japanese War in 1904, the Russian First Pacific Squadron was able to resist the Japanese attack during the Battle of the Yellow Sea. However, the squadron was destroyed during the Battle of Port Arthur and the Baltic Fleet, sent for reinforcement, was completely defeated in the Battle of Tsushima. The Grand Duke had been a strong opponent of naval reform and was considered partly responsible for the disaster. In 1904, the windows of his St. Petersburg palace were smashed by a crowd. That same year, the audience of that city's French theatre "hissed him from the building". When Balletta appeared on the stage in 1905 bedecked in diamonds, the audience cried: 'She has our fleet in her ears! On her every finger there is a cruiser!’.

On 2 June 1905 O.S., Alexei was relieved of his command and retired.

== Life at the Russian court ==
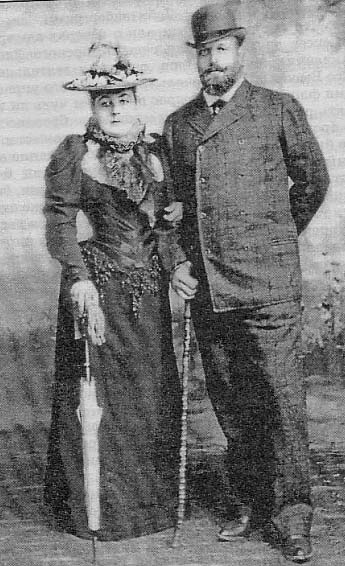
Grand Duke Alexei Alexandrovich and the Duchess of Leuchtenberg

His critics talked of Alexei's life as consisting of "fast women and slow ships", referring to his womanizing and the defeat of the Russian navy by the Japanese. Away from his desk, Alexei devoted his time to the good things of life. He entertained generously and collected fine silver and other works of art to adorn his palace. Sometimes he designed his own clothes. A womanizer, he spent his vacations in Paris or in Biarritz, each time in the company of a different lady.

Around the late 1880s, he started a celebrated affair with the Duchess of Leuchtenberg, the morganatic wife of one of his cousins Eugène von Leuchtenberg. Born Zinaida Skobelyeva, "Zina" was a strikingly beautiful woman who had married Eugeni of Leuchtenberg as his second wife in 1870. Alexander II made her Countess de Beauharnais and Alexander III raised her to Serene Highness and Duchess of Leuchtenberg. Alexei was so besotted with her that he conducted an affair openly, under her husband's roof and in his full knowledge. Eugene Leuchtenberg initially resented that Alexei cuckolded him. One night, Leuchtenberg arrived home late and found his wife's room locked. He knocked on the door and insisted that she let him in; Alexei opened the door kicked him downstairs. Later that day, Leuchtenberg complained to Alexander III of Russia, who told him that if he was incapable of managing his wife himself he could not expect others to help him. From that day forward, Leuchtenberg slept in his study and apparently accepted the situation. Leuchtenberg drank away most of his fortune; for years, he and Zinaida lived off his cousin's generosity. Even after his wife's death in 1899, the Duke continued to live under Alexei's roof.

Beside his military duties, Alexei was also chairman of the Imperial Commission for the Promotion of Ballet.

In 1904, he became one of the godparents of Tsarevich Alexei, the other godparents being the Dowager Empress Maria Feodorovna, Kaiser Wilhelm II of Germany, King Edward VII of the United Kingdom, King Christian IX of Denmark, Grand Duke Ernest Ludwig of Hesse, Grand Duchess Alexandra Iosifovna, Grand Duke Michael Nikolaevich, and Grand Duchess Olga Nikolaievna. All soldiers serving in the military during the Russo-Japanese War were also declared godfathers to Alexei.

== Death ==
After the assassination of his brother Grand Duke Sergei Alexandrovich of Russia in February 1905 and his retirement in disgrace from the navy in June that same year, Alexei Alexandrovich spent most of his time in the Paris house he had bought in 1897. At his house in Avenue Gabriel, he kept an open door for writers, painters, actors, and especially actresses. He had always been less interested in the armed services than in art and fashion, and he had long since been recognized as a connoisseur of the social, artistic, and literary life of Paris. His massive frame was a familiar sight at restaurants and theaters, particularly on first nights. His last public appearance a week before his death was at the dress rehearsal of a new play at the vaudeville. Decades of comfort and good living eventually took their toll on his health. He died of pneumonia in Paris on 27 November (14 November O.S.) 1908. His death was said to have devastated Tsar Nicholas II, his nephew, who reportedly claimed Alexei as his favourite uncle. In 2006, Alexei's diary was found in the Russian National Library amongst the Yussupov archive. The journal, written in Russian, begins in 1862 and ends in 1907. It has not been published yet.

== In fiction ==
The Adventure of the Seven Clocks (1952), part of The Exploits of Sherlock Holmes collection, deals with attempts of the Nihilist movement to assassinate the Grand Duke.

The 1973 Lucky Luke comic book Le Grand Duc features a Russian Grand Duke who visits the Wild West.

In 1977, Christopher Lee played a Russian Grand Duke hunting buffalo in three episodes of the TV-series How the West Was Won.

The western hunt is alluded to in the 1994 film Maverick, starring Mel Gibson. In the film, the Duke is hustled, after he has grown bored with hunting animals, into thinking that he is hunting a Native American.

He appears as a character in Boris Akunin's novel The Coronation (2000) under the name Georgi Aleksandrovich.

== Honours ==
- Austria-Hungary: Grand Cross of St. Stephen, 1874
- Denmark:
  - Knight of the Elephant, 17 June 1866
  - Cross of Honour of the Order of the Dannebrog, 21 December 1878
- France: Grand Cross of the Legion of Honour, November 1874
- Grand Duchy of Hesse: Grand Cross of the Ludwig Order, 8 June 1857
- Kingdom of Italy: Knight of the Annunciation, 19 November 1868
- Empire of Japan: Grand Cordon of the Order of the Chrysanthemum, 17 June 1882
- Oldenburg: Grand Cross of the Order of Duke Peter Friedrich Ludwig, with Golden Crown, 11 March 1863
- Kingdom of Portugal: Grand Cross of the Tower and Sword, 26 July 1866
- Kingdom of Prussia:
  - Knight of the Black Eagle, 14 January 1860
  - Pour le Mérite (military), 22 March 1879
  - Grand Commander's Cross of the Royal House Order of Hohenzollern, 11 June 1879
- Saxe-Weimar-Eisenach: Grand Cross of the White Falcon, 1 June 1868
- (Thailand) Siam: Knight of the Order of the Royal House of Chakri, 4 July 1897
- Sweden-Norway: Knight of the Seraphim, 28 August 1873
- Württemberg: Grand Cross of the Württemberg Crown, 1864
