= Belmond Villa San Michele =

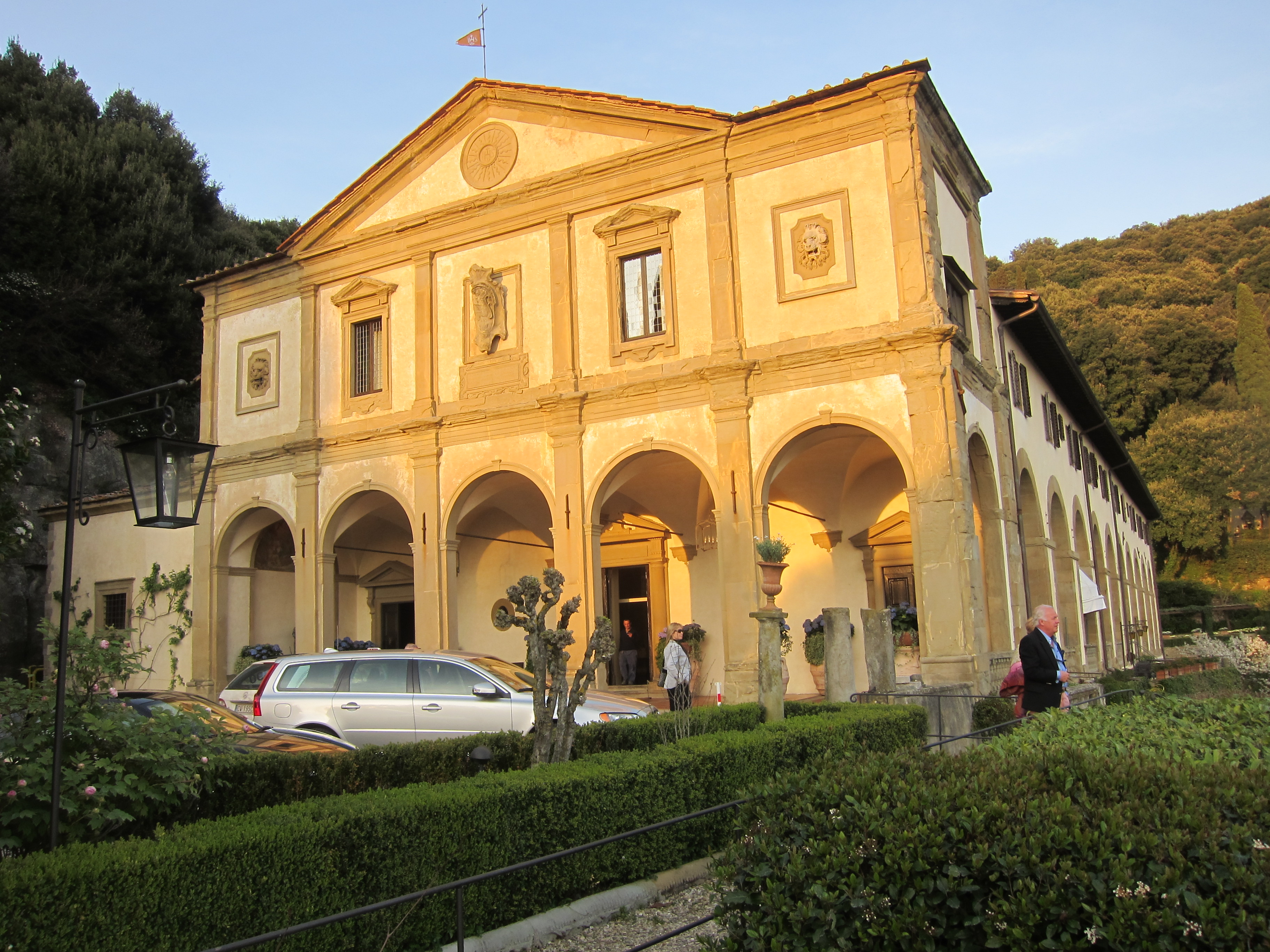
- Villa San Michele, Fiesole
- Interactive map of the Belmond Villa San Michele area
- Former names: Villa San Michele

General information
- Type: Luxury hotel
- Location: Florence, Italy
- Coordinates: 43°48′10″N 11°17′54″E
- Named for: Church of St Michael the Archangel
- Completed: 15th century
- Renovated: ≈1600s (expansion as monastery); ≈1900s (new owner); ≈1950s (post-World War II)
- Owner: Belmond Management Ltd

Technical details
- Floor count: 2

The Belmond Villa San Michele is a hotel situated on the hill of Fiesole overlooking Florence, Italy. It is named after the church of St Michael the Archangel. Today it is owned by Belmond Ltd. and is operated as a luxury hotel.

== History ==
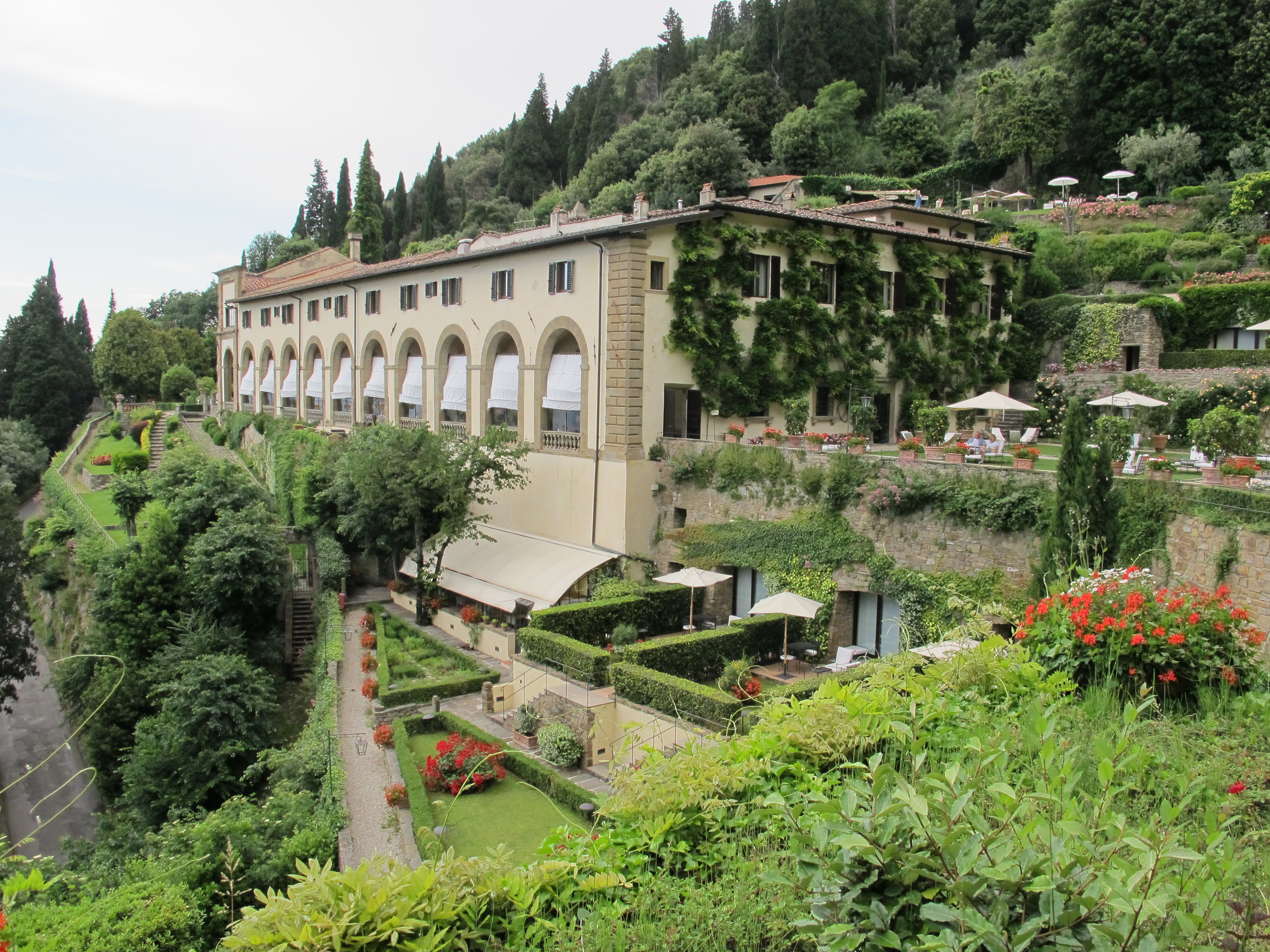
Villa San Michele, Fiesole

The original building was a monastery, founded in the early years of the 15th century for the Franciscan friars. The land on which it stood had been donated by a Florentine family, the Davanzatis, who also contributed to the monastery's upkeep by gifts of woodlands, further buildings and money.

The present building, with its façade attributed to Michelangelo and its imposing loggia, dates from 1600 when it was enlarged and completely renovated by Giovanni di Bartolomeo Davanzati. The monastery remained the property of the Franciscans until 1808 when the monastic orders were dissolved by Napoleon and, in 1817, it returned to secular use. By this time, many of its most treasured possessions had been dispersed throughout Florence's churches and art galleries.

In 1900 the Villa was acquired by Henry W. Cannon, a New York City bank president, who landscaped the gardens, erected large greenhouses and restored the building after the fashion of the Victorians, by adding wrought iron gates and by applying a rust-coloured patina to the walls. He also converted the courtyard into a winter garden by covering it with a roof of glass and iron.

During World War II, the Villa was badly damaged and, in 1950, it was bought by Monsieur Lucien Teissier and Madame Mary Teissier as a private residence.

He set about restoring the 20 first floor rooms, while living on the second floor, but the cost involved was substantial and to finance it, he turned the villa in to a hotel for those wanting to visit the nearby art treasures of Florence and the surrounding countryside.

In 1982, Orient-Express Hotels, which already owned the Hotel Cipriani in Venice bought the Villa San Michele and the surrounding land. A comprehensive restoration of the buildings was embarked upon, this time with the cooperation of the Florence Fine Arts Authority.

In 2014 the Villa San Michele was renamed the Belmond Villa San Michele when Orient-Express Hotels Ltd. changed its name to Belmond Ltd.
