= Alexandra Zhukovskaya =

Russian noblewoman and lady in waiting (1842–1899)

- Baroness of Seggiano
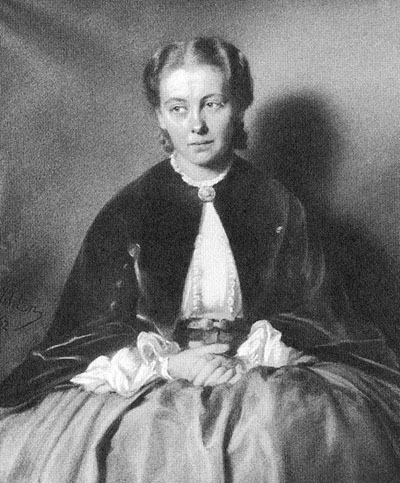
- Born: Alexandra Vasilievna Zhukovskaya; 11 November 1842; Düsseldorf , Prussia, German Empire
- Died: 26 August 1899 (aged 56); Wendischbora, Kingdom of Saxony, German Empire
- Noble family: Zhukovsky
- Spouse: Baron Christian Heinrich von Wermann (m. 1875)
- Issue: Count Aleksey Belevsky-Zhukovsky
- Father: Vasily Zhukovsky
- Mother: Elizabeth von Reutern

Alexandra Vasilievna Zhukovskaya, Baroness of Seggiano (11 November 1842 in Düsseldorf – 26 August 1899 in Wendischbora, Germany), was a Russian noblewoman and lady in waiting.

== Biography ==
She was the daughter of Vasily Andreyevich Zhukovsky and his Baltic-German wife, Elizabeth von Reutern (1821-1856). Her father was the illegitimate son of a landowner named Afanasi Bunin and his Turkish housekeeper Salkha.

She was made lady-in-waiting of the empress, Maria Alexandrovna (Marie of Hesse), at the Russian Imperial court.

At the age of twenty, Grand Duke Alexei Alexandrovich, the 4th son of Alexander II, according to the generally accepted opinion, secretly married Zhukovskaya (there is no exact information when and where: according to some sources in Italy, according to others – 9/21 September 1868 in Russian Orthodox Church in Geneva), but the marriage was not approved by the emperor and dissolved by the Synod, since Alexandra was no match for him. According to other sources, the relationship between Alexandra Vasilyevna and the Grand Duke remained only an extramarital affair (although in letters he called her "wife"). At the time of the beginning of the novel, he was 19, and she was 27 years old.

In the memoirs of E.P. Letkova-Sultanova, the story, about which "all Petersburg" spoke at one time, was recorded from the words of Pavel Zhukovsky and contains an interesting detail: upon learning that his sister was pregnant, he came to the Grand Duke, demanded a duel, and when Alexander II forbade his son to accept the challenge, Zhukovsky openly protested against the emperor's decision. The Grand Duke wanted to marry, but Alexander II did not allow him and sent him on a voyage around the world for two years; Zhukovskaya was exiled abroad, followed by her brother. The State Archives of the Russian Federation has preserved a diary-collection of letters from the Grand Duke, which he kept in separation.

On 20 August 1871, Alexei Alexandrovich was sent on a round-the-world voyage, and on 26 November of the same year, Alexandra gave birth to a son in Salzburg from the Grand Duke, named after her father Alexei. The Grand Duke was at sea for 2 years, during which time Zhukovskaya was subjected to strong pressure from the imperial family and relations were interrupted on her initiative.

Alexandra and Alexei had one child, a son, Count Alexei Alexandrovich Belevsky-Zhukovsky (1871–1931), He received the title Count Belevsky on 21 March 1884 from his uncle, Emperor Alexander III. In 1901 he added his name of his grandfather on his mother's side.

The Grand Duke tried to get a title for her and her son. However, the Emperor, his father refused. He was however able to secure her a title by the Republic of San Marino. She was made on 24 March 1875 Baroness of Seggiano (Baronessa di Seggiano).

The same year, on 14 December 1875 she married Baron Christian Heinrich von Wöhrmann (1849-1932) in Munich. This marriage seems to prove that she did not marry the Grand Duke before. No proof of a divorce exists.

== Descendants ==
1. Count Alexei Alexandrovich Belevsky-Zhukovsky, married Princess Maria Petrovna Troubetskaya (18 June 1872 Russia – 20 March 1954 Paris) at Illinskoye manor, had issue. Married secondly Baroness Natalia von Schoeppingk, no issue.
  1. Elizabeth (8 November 1896 - 30 July 1975, New Jersey) Married first Peter Glinka-Perevozchikov (1872-1937), had issue . Married second Arthur Lurie (May 14, 1892 - November 13, 1966), no issue.
    1. Maria Perevozchikova (27 December 1917 - 1 August 1990) married Lucien Tessier.
      1. Alexi Tessier (b. August 27, 1946, Paris).
      2. Marie Beatrice Tessier (b. Circa 1950).
    2. Dmitri Perevozchikov (24 June 1919 - 23 August 1960) married Maria Ursova
  2. Alexandra (19 April 1899 - ?) Married first Heinrich Lepp, no issue. Married second Georgy Flevitsky, no issue.
  3. Maria (26 October 1901 - 18 August 1996, Paris). Married first Vladimir Sergeyevich Sverbeev (1892-1951), had issue. Married second to Vladmir Alexandrovich Yanushevsky, no issue.
    1. Elizabeth Sverbeeva (28 August 1923 - 1 April 2020). Married first Alexander Tsarsaide, no issue. Married second Charles Byron-Patrikades, no issue.
  4. Count Sergei Alekseevich Belevsky-Zhukovsky (8 February 1904 - 27 November 1965, Los Angeles. Married Nina Botkina (1901 - 1966), had issue.
    1. Elena Sergeevna (b. August 1929), lives in France. Married first Nikolai Mozhaisky (b. 17 June 1928), had issue. Married second Count Kirill Mikhailovich Nieroth/Nirot (b. 14 April 1930), had issue.
      1. Alexi Mozhaisky-Nirot (b. 20 December 1951) married Pamela Waldbauer (b. 17 March 1953) had issue.
        1. Katherine Nirot (b. 27 February 1983, Connecticut, USA).
        2. Christopher Nirot (b. 23 August 1989, Connecticut, USA).
      2. Count Peter Nirot (b. 17 June 1957).
      3. Countess Elizabeth Nirot (b. 2 February 1966, Houston, USA).
