= Schoeppingk =

German noble family

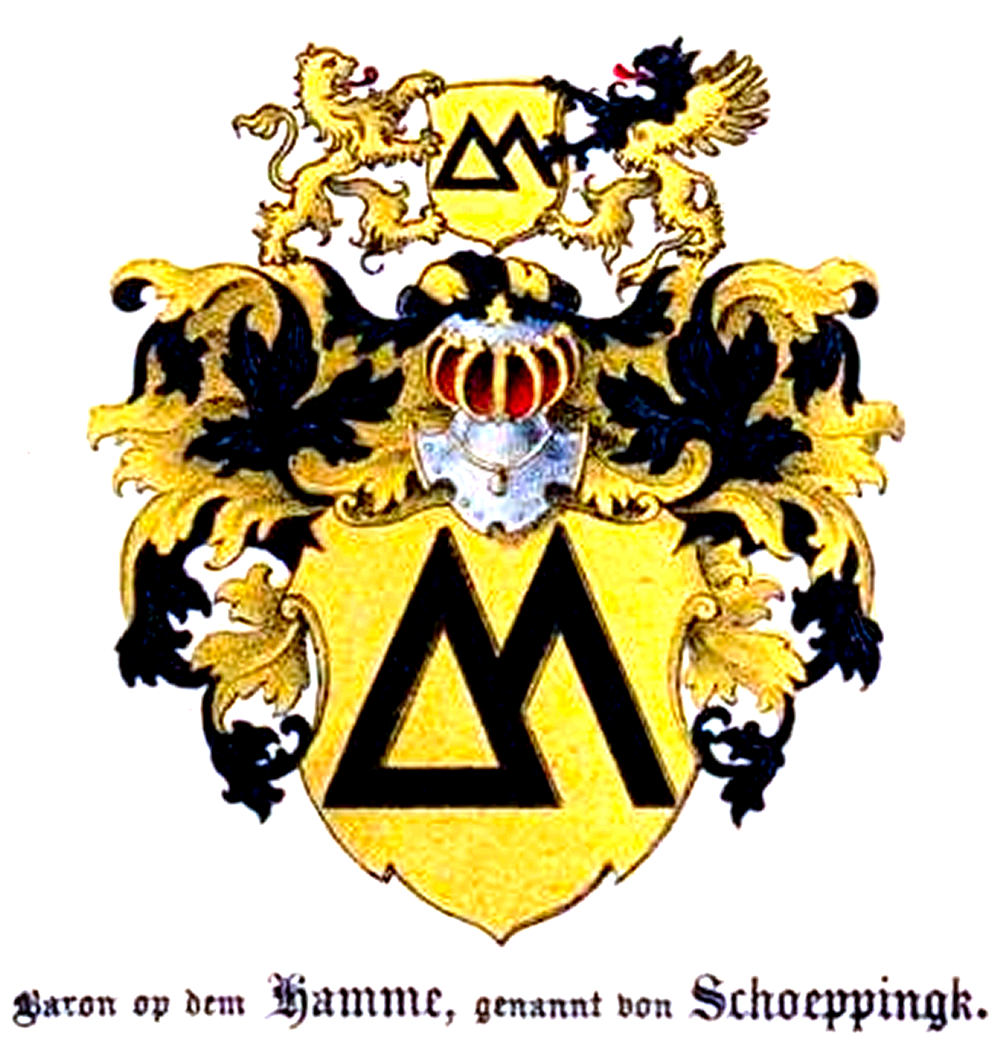
- Origin: Westphalia
- Estate: Bornsmünde

The Schoeppingk family (German: Freiherren op dem Hamme genannt von Schoeppingk) is a Baltic-German noble family, which also belonged to the Russian nobility.

== History ==
The Schoeppingk family lived in Westphalia the 13th century, migrated in the 15th century to Courland, and on 17 October 1620, were included in the list of Courland nobility. In 1818 the head of the family was created Baron of the Russian Empire.

== Notable members ==
- Ernst Dietrich Freiherr op dem Hamme genannt Schoeppingk (Dmitry) - after Courland became part of the Russian empire, was appointed to the Privy Council.
- Magnus Friedrich Freiherr op dem Hamme genannt Schoeppingk - (Fyodor Dmitriyevich; d. 1855) - Privy Councillor
- Otto Friedrich Freiherr op dem Hamme genannt Schoeppingk (1790—1874) - Major-General.
- Baron Dmitry Ottovich Shepping (1823—1895) - Russian historian, archaeologist, ethnographer
- Juliane Anna Elisabeth Gräfin von der Pahlen, born Freiin op dem Hamme genannt Schoeppingk (1751—1814) - wife of Peter Ludwig von der Pahlen
