= Bornsminde Manor =

Manor house in Latvia

- Semigallia, Latvia
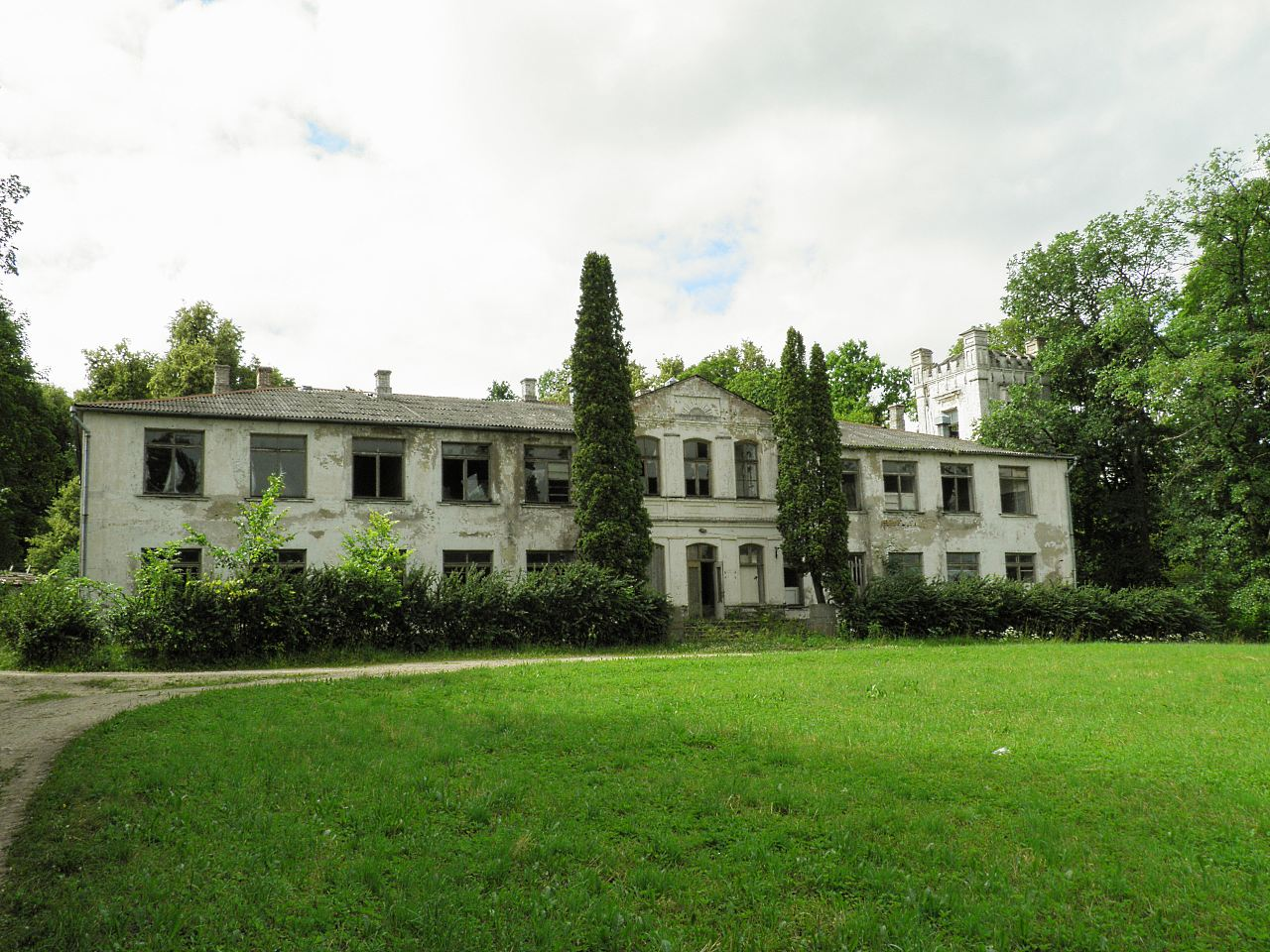

Site information
- Type: Manor

Location
- Coordinates: 56°24′45″N 24°06′24″E

Bornsminde Manor (German: Herrenhaus Bornsmünde) is a manor house located in the Rundāle Parish of Rundāle Municipality in the Semigallia region of Latvia.

== History ==
The first manor owner was Josef von Heiden, who was replaced in 1462 by Master of the Livonian Order Johann von Mengede. From the 15th century until the end of the 1920s, the manor was owned by the von Šeping noble family, and from 1499 to 1868 it was directly inherited by a son from his father. Around 1763, the new manor house was built in its present location - a one-story brick building in baroque style. Between 1805 and 1806, it was rebuilt in the late classicism style by architect Pietro Ponchini and became a two-storied building. Servants' barns were built on both sides of the parade courtyard, and at the end of the barn and further on, stables. In 1880s the manor house was rebuilt again to give it a fashionable Gothic revival look with addition of a tower. It was rebuilt once again in 1962 when building obtained it present appearance, losing the facade decorations and interior finishing elements of the past. In the 50s and 60s of the 20th century, the building houses the dormitories of the National Agricultural Technical School. Between 1967 and mid-1992 the manor housed a tuberculosis hospital. In July 1993, Bornsminde Manor became the property of Rundale Parish Municipality, privatized in 2000.

== See also ==
- List of palaces and manor houses in Latvia
