= William Page (painter) =

American painter and portrait artist (1811–1885)

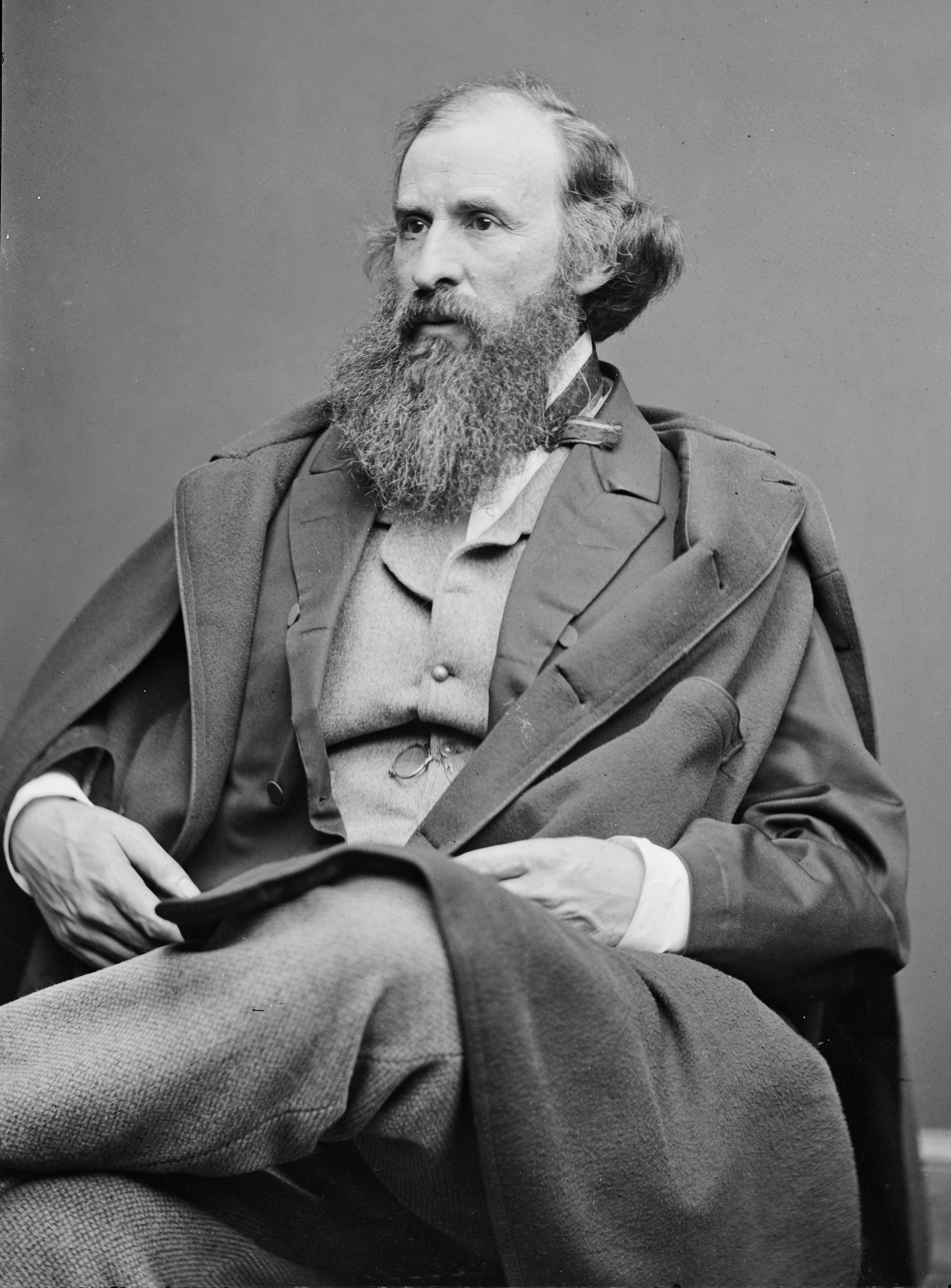
- Photograph by the Mathew Brady Studio, c. 1860s
- Born: January 3, 1811; Albany, New York, US
- Died: October 1, 1885 (aged 74); Tottenville, Staten Island, New York, US

Signature
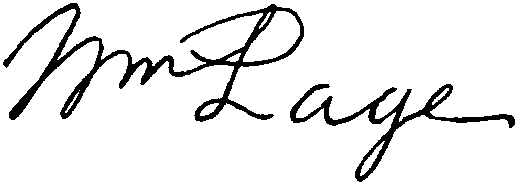

William Page (January 3, 1811 – October 1, 1885) was an American painter and portrait artist.

== Biography ==
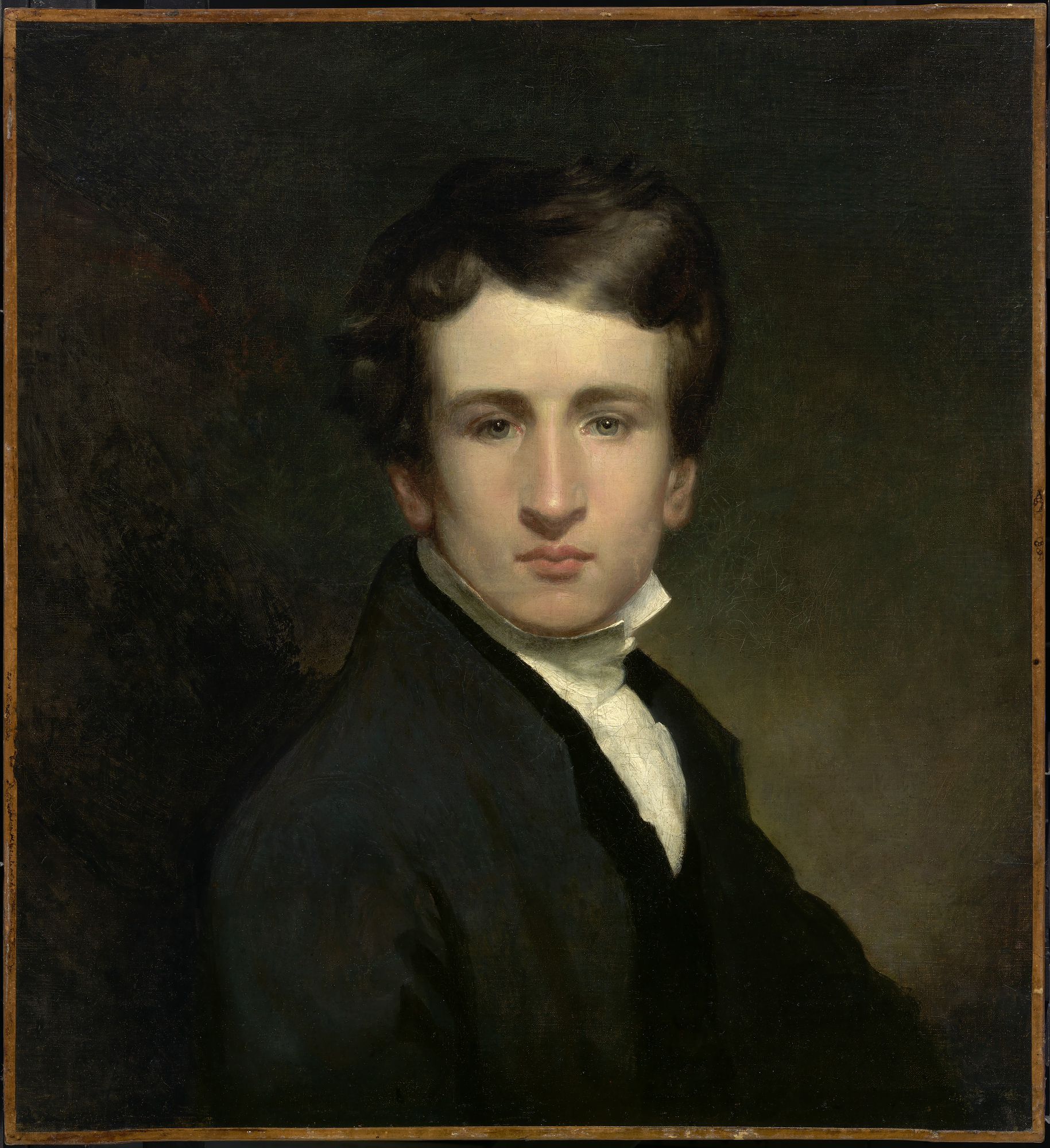
Self-portrait, 1830

He came to New York City with his parents at the age of nine, and in 1822 received a premium from the American Institute for a drawing in India ink. At the age of 14, he began to study law in the office of Frederick de Peyster, which he soon left to enter the studio of James Herring, and in less than a year he became a pupil of Samuel F. B. Morse, through whom he also enrolled at the National Academy of Design. His drawings in the antique class at the National Academy won him the silver medal, but, having joined the Presbyterian Church, he determined to enter its ministry. For two years from 1828, he studied theology at the Andover Theological Seminar and Amherst College, at the end of which time he returned to art.

After painting portraits in Albany for a year, he went to New York, where he executed likenesses of William L. Marcy and John Quincy Adams. In 1836, he was elected a National Academician, and he was president of the National Academy from 1871 until 1873. About 1844 he moved to Boston, but in 1847 he returned to New York for a stay of two years.

Page then went to Italy, where he resided for eleven years in Florence and Rome, coming back to New York in 1860. While he was in Italy, he painted the portraits of Robert and Elizabeth Browning and other well-known Englishmen and Americans. He also took occasion to study the works of the great masters, notably Titian, whom he admired and emulated, and whose method of painting he strove to discover. The copies that he executed of Titian's paintings were so remarkable that one of them was seized by the Florentine authorities under the belief that it was the original. He was also a friend of William Wetmore Story and of James Russell Lowell, who dedicated his first collection of poems to him in 1843.

He died in 1885, aged 74 on Staten Island. Although extravagantly praised as an artist from the 1830s into the 1860s, Page's reputation suffered in later life because he changed his style so frequently and, more particularly, because technical characteristics of his painting method soon caused much of his work to darken excessively.

== Works ==
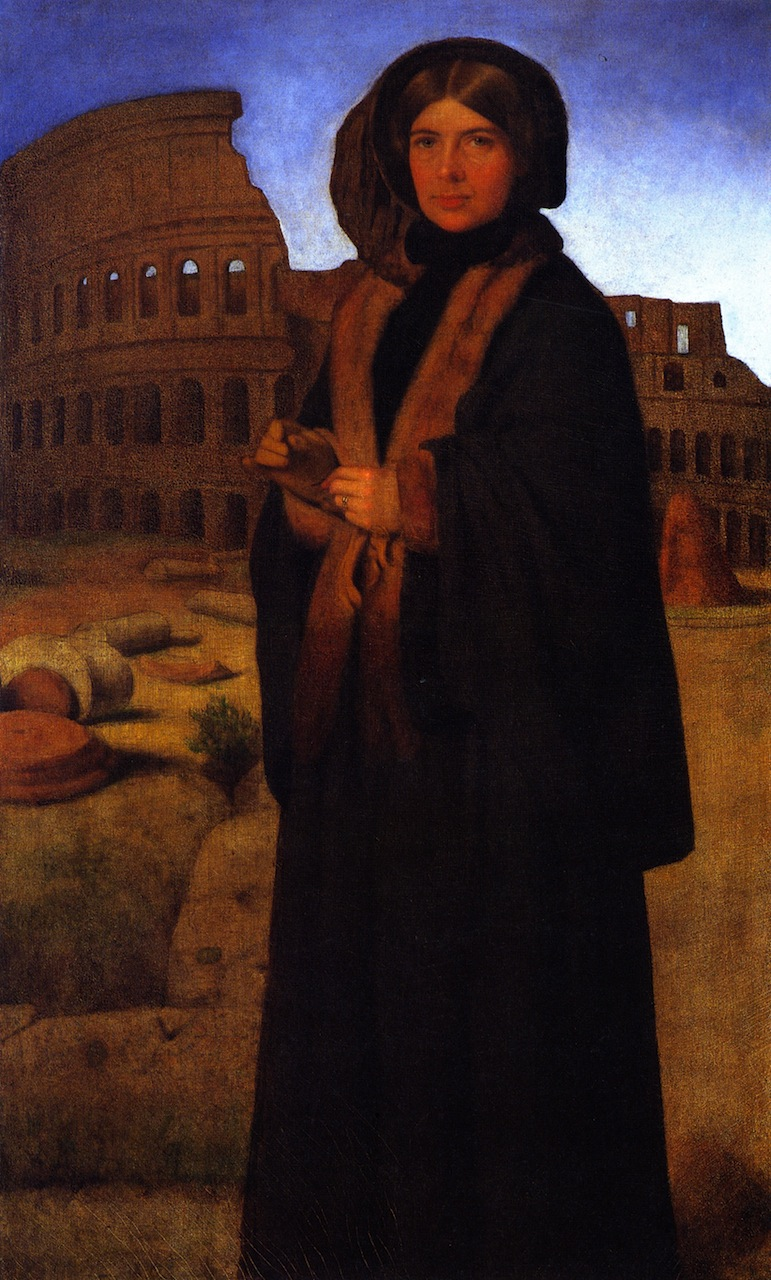
Mrs William Page (c. 1860)

In Italy, he produced his "Venus," "Moses and Aaron on Mount Horeb," "Infant Bacchus," and "Flight into Egypt." His work also includes a full-length portrait of Admiral David Farragut at the Battle of Mobile Bay (purchased by a committee in 1871, and presented to the emperor of Russia), the "Holy Family" (1837, now at the Boston Athenaeum) and "The Young Merchants" (now at Pennsylvania Academy of the Fine Arts in Philadelphia). In 1870, Page exhibited a portrait head of Jesus Christ which attracted great attention and excited much controversy. Other paintings include: "The Last Interview" (1838), "Ruth and Naomi," and "Cupid" (1880).

Among his many portraits, for which he was most noted, are those of Hiram Powers (painted in Florence about 1848), Henry Ward Beecher, Wendell Phillips, Charles P. Daly (1848, in New York Historical Society), James Russell Lowell, Josiah Quincy III, Gov. Reuben E. Fenton (1870), Charlotte Cushman, Ulysses S. Grant (1880), Thomas Le Clear (1883), and Charles Sumner (left unfinished upon Sumner's death). In 1874 Page made a second visit to Europe, in order to study Ludwig Becker's supposed death mask of William Shakespeare preserved in Germany, and on his return he executed a large bust and several portraits of Shakespeare (1874–78).

He wrote A New Geometrical Method of Measuring the Human Figure (1860), and invented and patented various improvements in boats and guns.

== Notes ==
Attribution
