= Vasily Zhukovsky =

Russian poet (1783–1852)

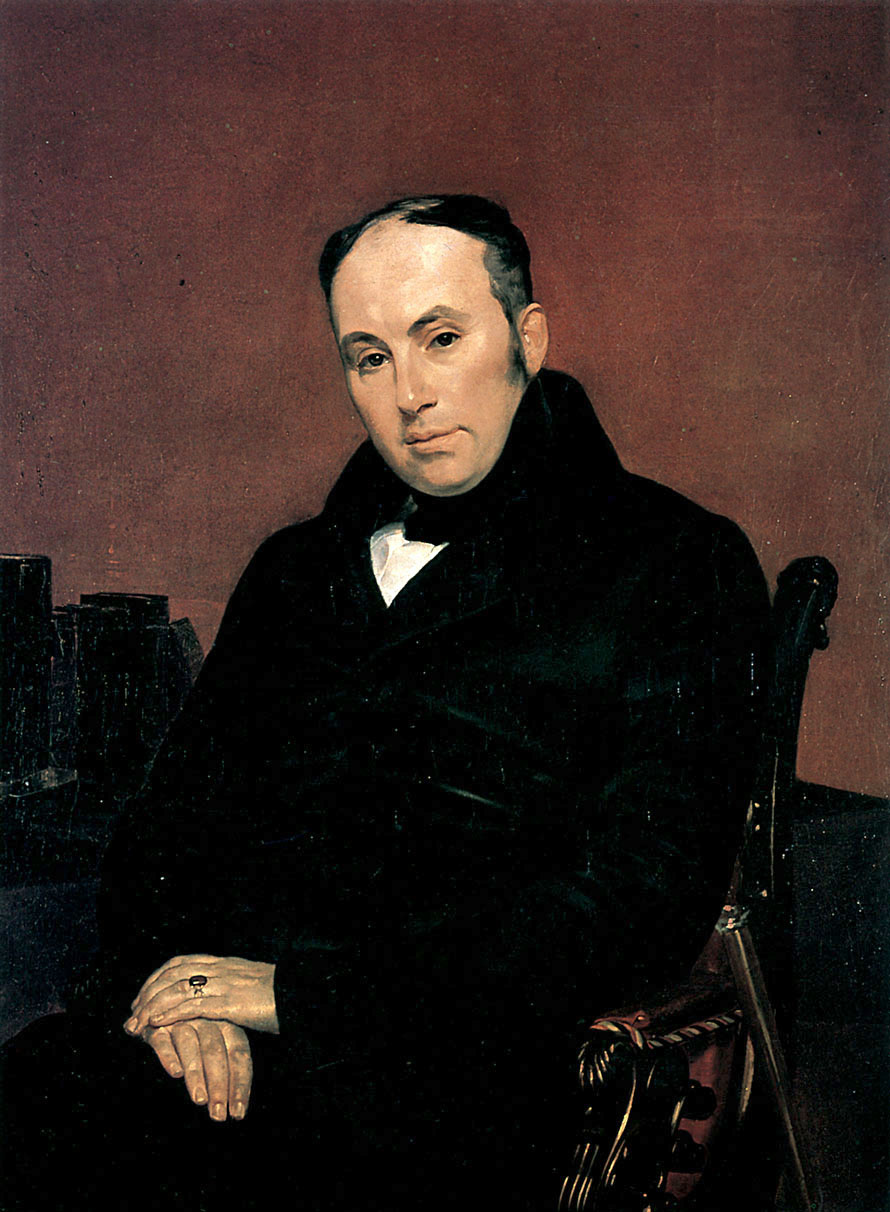
- Portrait by Karl Bryullov, 1837–1838
- Born: Vasily Andreyevich Zhukovsky; 9 February 1783; Mishenskoe, Belyovsky Uyezd, Tula Governorate, Russian Empire
- Died: 24 April 1852 (aged 69); Baden-Baden, Grand Duchy of Baden, German Confederation
- Buried: Tikhvin Cemetery, Saint Petersburg
- Spouse: Elizabeth von Reutern (m. 1841)
- Issue: Alexandra Zhukovskaya; Pavel Zhukovsky
- Father: Afanasi Bunin
- Mother: Salkha
- Occupation: Poet

Vasily Andreyevich Zhukovsky (Russian: Василий Андреевич Жуковский; 9 February [O.S. 29 January] 1783 – 24 April [O.S. 12 April] 1852) was the foremost Russian poet of the 1810s and a leading figure in Russian literature in the first half of the 19th century. He held a high position at the Romanov court as tutor to the Grand Duchess Alexandra Feodorovna and later to her son, the future tsar Alexander II.

Zhukovsky is credited with introducing the Romantic movement into Russia. The main body of his literary output consists of free translations covering an impressively wide range of poets, from ancients like Ferdowsi and Homer to his contemporaries Goethe, Schiller, Byron, and others. Many of his translations have become classics of Russian literature, regarded by some to be better written and more enduring in Russian than in their original languages.

== Life ==
Zhukovsky was born on 9 February [O.S. 29 January] 1783 in the village of Mishenskoe in the Tula Governorate of the Russian Empire. He was the illegitimate son of a landowner named Afanasi Bunin and his Turkish housekeeper Salkha, who had been captured during the siege of Bender in 1770 and brought to Russia as a slave.

The Bunin family had a literary bent and some 90 years later produced the Nobel Prize-winning modernist writer Ivan Bunin. Although raised in the Bunin family circle, the infant poet was formally adopted by a family friend for reasons of social propriety and kept his adopted surname and patronymic for the rest of his life. At the age of fourteen, he was sent to Moscow to be educated at the Moscow University's boarding school for noblemen. There, he was heavily influenced by Freemasonry, as well as by the fashionable literary trends of English Sentimentalism and German Sturm und Drang. He also met Nikolay Karamzin, the preeminent Russian man of letters and the founding editor of the most important literary journal of the day, Vestnik Yevropy (The herald of Europe).

In December 1802, the 19-year-old Zhukovsky published a free translation of Thomas Gray's "Elegy Written in a Country Churchyard" in Karamzin's journal. The translation was the first sustained example of his trademark sentimental-melancholy style, which at the time was strikingly original in Russian. It made him so well known among Russian readers that in 1808 Karamzin asked him to take over the editorship of Vestnik Yevropy. The young poet used this position to explore Romantic themes, motifs, and genres—largely by way of translation.

Zhukovsky was among the first Russian writers to cultivate the mystique of the Romantic poet. Much of his original work was inspired by his half-niece Maria "Masha" Protasova, the daughter of one of his several half-sisters, with whom he had a passionate but ultimately Platonic affair. He also came under the influence of Romanticism in the medieval Hansa cities of Dorpat and Revel, now called Tartu and Tallinn, which were then part of the Russian Empire. The Imperial University of Dorpat had been opened as the only German-speaking university in Imperial Russia.

Zhukovsky's rise at court began with Napoleon's invasion of 1812 and with the consequent revilement of French as the favored foreign language of the Russian aristocracy. Like thousands of others, Zhukovsky volunteered for the defense of Moscow and was present at the Battle of Borodino. There he joined the Russian general staff under Field Marshal Kutuzov, who drafted him to work on propaganda and morale. After the war, he settled down temporarily in the village of Dolbino, near Moscow, where in 1815 he experienced a burst of poetic creativity known as the Dolbino Autumn. His work in this period attracted the attention of Grand Duchess Alexandra Feodorovna, the German-born wife of Grand Duke Nicholas, the future Tsar Nicholas I. Alexandra invited Zhukovsky to Saint Petersburg to be her personal Russian tutor. Many of Zhukovsky's best translations from German, including almost all of his translations of Goethe, were made as practical language exercises for Alexandra.

Zhukovsky's pedagogical career removed him in some respects from the forefront of Russian literary life, while at the same time positioning him to become one of the most powerful intellectuals in Russia. Among his first acts on moving to Saint Petersburg was to establish the jocular Arzamas literary society in order to promote Karamzin's European-oriented, anti-classicist aesthetics. Members of the Arzamas included the teenage Alexander Pushkin, who rapidly emerged as his poetic heir apparent. Indeed, by the early 1820s, Pushkin had upstaged Zhukovsky in terms of the originality and brilliance of his work—even in Zhukovsky's own estimation. Yet the two remained lifelong friends, with the older poet acting as a literary mentor and protector at court.

Much of Zhukovsky's subsequent influence can be attributed to this gift for friendship. His good personal relations with Nicholas spared him the fate of other liberal intellectuals following the ill-fated 1825 Decembrist Revolt. Shortly after Nicholas ascended the throne, he appointed Zhukovsky tutor to the tsarevich Alexander, later to become the tsar Alexander II. Zhukovsky's progressive educational methods influenced the young Alexander so deeply that many historians attribute the liberal reforms of the 1860s at least partially to them. The poet also used his high station at court to take up the cudgels for such free-thinking writers as Mikhail Lermontov, Alexander Herzen, and Taras Shevchenko (Zhukovsky was instrumental in buying him out of serfdom), as well as many of the persecuted Decembrists.

On Pushkin's early death in 1837, Zhukovsky stepped in as his literary executor, not only rescuing his work from a hostile censorship (including several unpublished masterpieces), but also diligently collecting and preparing it for publication. Throughout the 1830s and 1840s, Zhukovsky also promoted the career of Nikolay Gogol, another close personal friend. In this way, he acted as an impresario for the developing Russian Romantic movement.

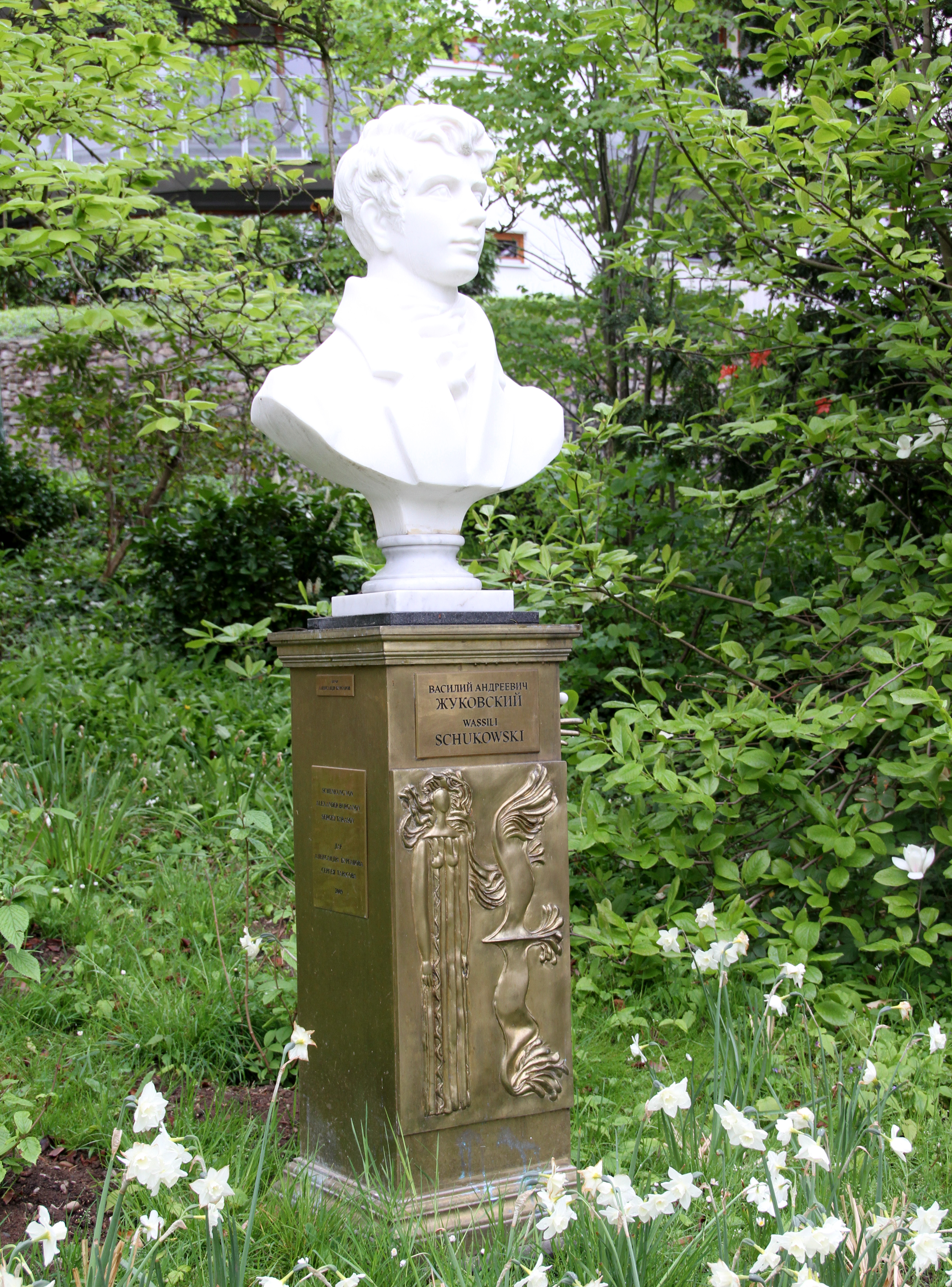
Bust of Zhukovsky in Baden-Baden

Like his mentor Karamzin, Zhukovsky travelled widely in Europe, above all in the German-speaking world, where his connections with the Prussian court in Berlin gave him access to high society in spa-towns like Baden-Baden and Bad Ems. He also met and corresponded with world-class cultural figures like Goethe, the poet Ludwig Tieck, and the landscape painter Caspar David Friedrich. In 1841, Zhukovsky retired from court and settled near Düsseldorf, where he married Elisabeth von Reutern, the 18-year-old daughter of Gerhardt Wilhelm von Reutern, an artist friend. The couple had two children, a girl named Alexandra and a boy named Pavel. Alexandra later had a much talked-about affair with Grand Duke Alexei Alexandrovich.

Zhukovsky died in Baden-Baden in 1852, aged 69. His body was returned to Saint Petersburg and buried in the Alexander Nevsky Lavra. His crypt can be found directly behind the monument to Dostoevsky.

== Work ==
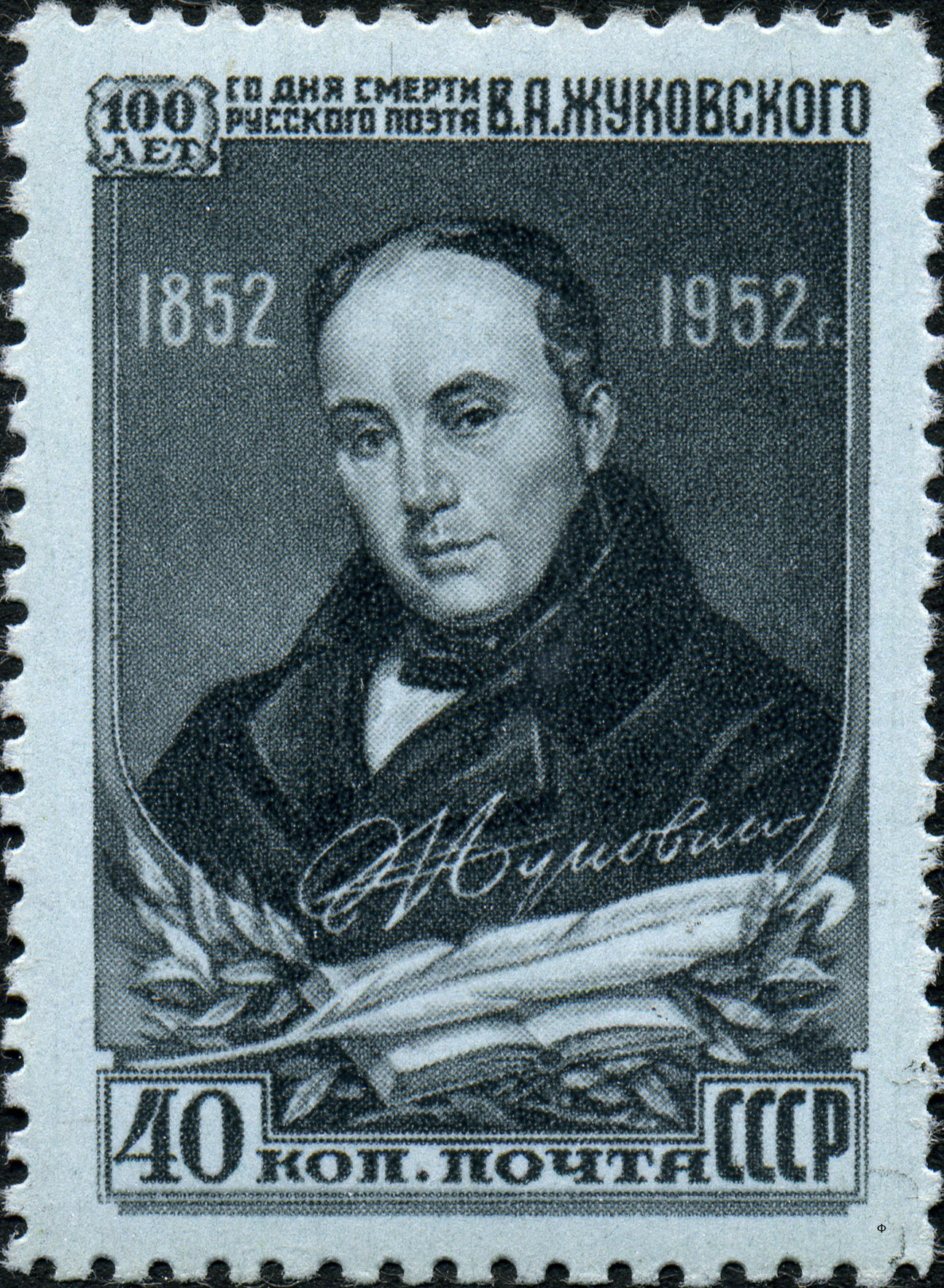
Zhukovsky on a 1952 stamp

In the opinion of Vladimir Nabokov, Zhukovsky was "a wonderful translator, who surpassed both Seidlitz and Schiller in his versions of their poems, and one of the greatest minor poets that ever was." His main contribution was as a stylistic and formal innovator who borrowed freely from European literature in order to provide high-quality models for "original" works in Russian. His translation of Gray's "Elegy" is still cited by scholars as the conventional starting point for the Russian Romantic Movement. He also wrote some prose, the best-known example of which is the 1809 short story "Marina roshcha" ("Mary's grove"), about the ancient past of Moscow; it was inspired by Nikolay Karamzin's famous story "Poor Liza" (1792).

Zhukovsky translated from a staggeringly wide range of sources, often without attribution, given that modern ideas of intellectual property did not exist in his day. In his choice of original, however, he was consistently motivated by formal principles, above all generic. Following his initial success with the "Elegy", he was especially admired for his first-rate melodious translations of German and English ballads. Among these, the ballad "Ludmila" (1808) and its companion piece "Svetlana" (1813) are considered landmarks in the Russian poetic tradition. Both are free translations of Gottfried August Burger's well-known German ballad "Lenore", although each renders the original in a completely different way. Characteristically, Zhukovsky later translated "Lenore" yet a third time as part of his lifelong effort to develop a natural-sounding Russian dactylic hexameter. His many translations of Schiller—including both Classical and Romantic ballads, lyrics, and the verse drama Die Jungfrau von Orléans (about Joan of Arc)—became classic works in Russian that many consider to be of equal if not higher quality than their originals. They were remarkable for their psychological depth, strongly influencing the younger generation of Russian realists, among them Dostoevsky, who famously called them "nash Schiller" ("our Schiller").

Zhukovsky also wrote original verse. His love lyrics to Masha Protasova, such as "Moi drug, khranitel'-angel moi" ("My friend, my guardian angel ..."), are minor classics of the genre. Probably his best-known original poem is the patriotic ode "A Bard in the Camp of the Russian Warriors", which he wrote to boost the morale of Russian troops during his service on Kutuzov's general staff. He also composed the lyrics for the national anthem of Imperial Russia, "God Save the Tsar!"

In the late 1830s, after a period of partial withdrawal from the literary scene, Zhukovsky staged a comeback with a highly original verse translation of his German friend Friedrich de la Motte Fouqué's prose novella Undine. Written in a waltzing hexameter, Zhukovsky's version later inspired the libretto for an opera by Tchaikovsky.

On retiring from court, Zhukovsky devoted his remaining years to hexameter translations of Eastern poetry, including long excerpts from the Persian epic Shahnameh. His greatest achievement in this period, however, was his translation of Homer's Odyssey, which he finally published in 1849. Although the translation has been strongly criticized for its distortions of the original, it became a classic in its own right and occupies a notable place in the history of Russian poetry. Some scholars argue that both his Undina and his Odyssey—as long narrative works in verse—made a significant, albeit oblique contribution to the development of the 19th-century Russian novel.

All in all, Zhukovsky's work probably constitutes the most important body of literary hermeneutics in the modern Russian language. He is often considered the founder of a "German school" of Russian poets and as such has influenced figures as far afield as Fyodor Tyutchev and Marina Tsvetaeva.

== Sources ==
- Nabokov, Vladimir (1961) [First published in 1959]. Nikolai Gogol (Corrected ed.). New York: New Directions. ISBN 0-8112-0120-1.
- Pein, Annette (1991). Schiller and Zhukovsky: Aesthetic Theory in Poetic Translation. Mainz: Liber.
- Rueckert, George (2003). Zhukovsky and the Germans: A Study in Romantic Hermeneutics (PhD thesis). Seattle: University of Washington.
- Semenko, I. M. (1975). Zhizn' i poeziia Zhukovskogo [Zhukovsky's life and poetry] (in Russian). Moscow: Khudozhestvennaia literatura.
- Semenko, I. M. (1976). Vasily Zhukovsky. Boston: Twayne Publishers. ISBN 0-8057-2995-X.
- Veselovsky, A. N. (1999). V. A. Zhukovskii: Poeziia chuvstva i "serdechnogo voobrazheniia" [V. A. Zhukovsky: the poetry of feeling and 'heartfelt imagination'] (in Russian). Moscow: Intrada.
- Yanushkevich, A. S. (1985). Etapy i problemy tvorcheskoi evolutsii V.A. Zhukovskogo [Phases and problems of Zhukovsky's creative development] (in Russian). Tomsk: Izd. Tomskogo Universiteta.
- Yesuitova, R.V. (1989). Zhukovskii i ego vremia [Zhukovsky and his time] (in Russian). Leningrad: Nauka.
