= Marchioness of Milford Haven =

Marchioness of Milford Haven may refer to:

- Princess Victoria of Hesse and by Rhine (1863–1950), wife of Prince Louis of Battenberg, created Marquess of Milford Haven in 1917.
- Nadejda Mountbatten, Marchioness of Milford Haven (1896–1963), wife of George Mountbatten, 2nd Marquess of Milford Haven.
- Romaine Dahlgren Pierce (1923–1975), first wife of David Mountbatten, 3rd Marquess of Milford Haven between 1950–1954
- Janet Mountbatten, Dowager Marchioness of Milford Haven (b. 1937), second wife of David Mountbatten, 3rd Marquess of Milford Haven (m. 1960)
- Sarah Georgina Walker (b. 1961/2), first wife of George Mountbatten, 4th Marquess of Milford Haven between 1989–1996
- Clare Mountbatten, Marchioness of Milford Haven (b. 1960), second wife of George Mountbatten, 4th Marquess of Milford Haven (m. 1997)
