= Wedding of Princess Eugenie and Jack Brooksbank =

2018 wedding British royal wedding

- Date: 12 October 2018; 8 years ago
- Venue: St George's Chapel, Windsor Castle
- Location: Windsor, Berkshire, England
- Participants: Princess Eugenie of York; Jack Brooksbank

The wedding of Princess Eugenie of York and Jack Brooksbank took place on 12 October 2018 at St George's Chapel at Windsor Castle in the United Kingdom. The bride is a member of the British royal family. The groom is a British wine merchant, brand ambassador of Casamigos Tequila, and socialite. The dean of Windsor, David Conner, officiated at the wedding using the standard Anglican church service for Holy Matrimony published in Common Worship, the liturgical text of the Church of England. Princess Eugenie was the first British princess of royal blood to marry in the Church of England since the wedding of Princess Anne and Mark Phillips 45 years before.

== Engagement announcement ==
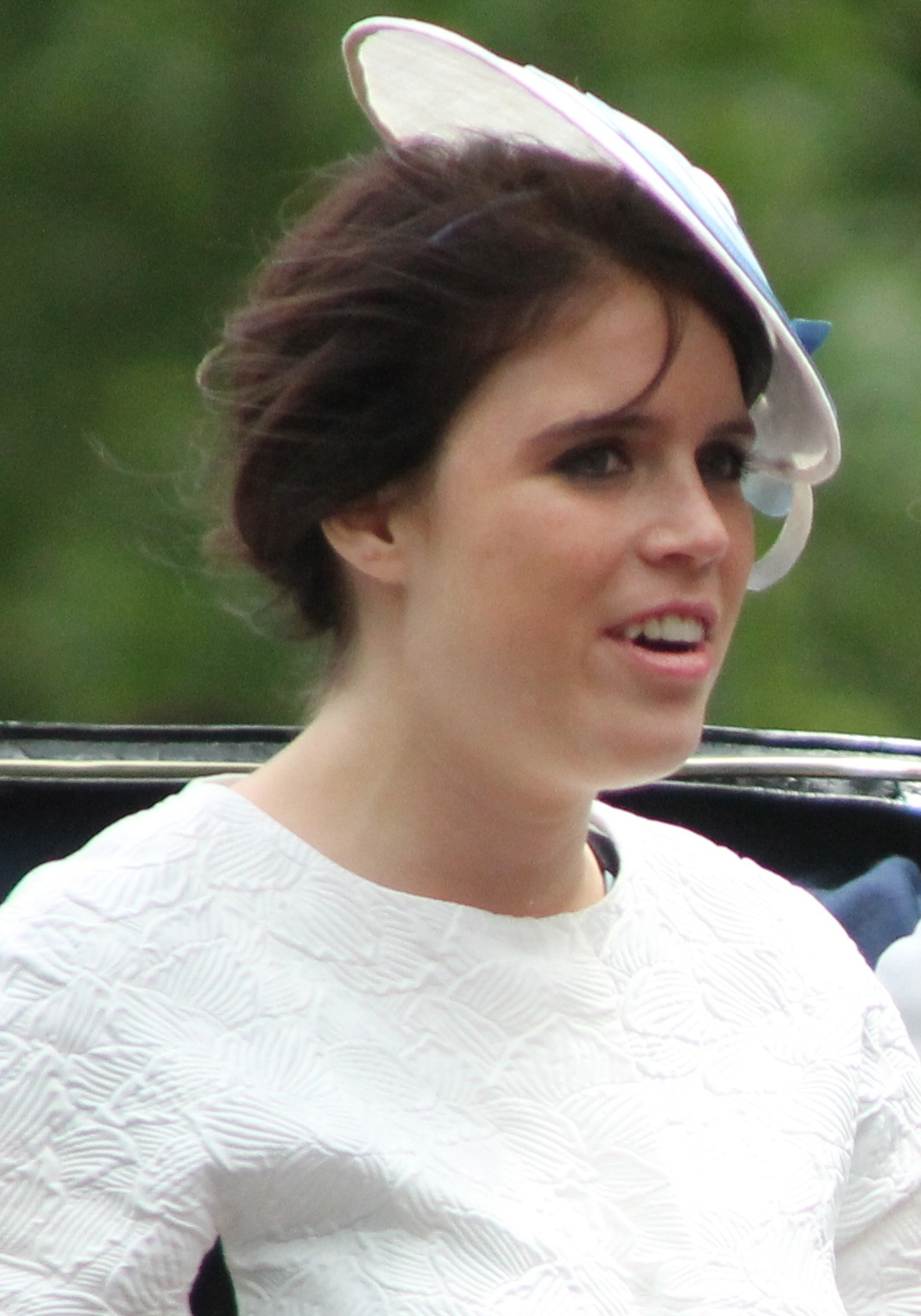
Princess Eugenie of York in 2013

Princess Eugenie of York is the second daughter of Andrew Mountbatten-Windsor, formerly Prince Andrew, Duke of York, and Sarah Ferguson. At the time of the engagement announcement, she was eighth in the line of succession to the British throne.

Jack Christopher Stamp Brooksbank is the European brand manager for Casamigos Tequila, the company co-founded by George Clooney. Brooksbank is descended from the Brooksbank baronets: he is the great-great-grandson of Sir Edward Clitherow Brooksbank, 1st Baronet. Jack is a third cousin twice removed of Princess Eugenie through Thomas Coke, 2nd Earl of Leicester. (Note: Thomas Coke, 2nd Earl of Leicester, is Princess Eugenie's great-great-great-great-grandfather on the side of her mother, Sarah, Duchess of York; the Earl is also Brooksbank's great-great-grandfather via his second marriage, to The Honourable Georgina Cavendish.) His great-grandfather is Sir Jack Coke, Gentleman Usher to King George VI and Extra Gentleman Usher to Queen Elizabeth II. Brooksbank's parents are Old Etonian George Brooksbank, a company director and chartered accountant, and his wife, Nicola (née Newton) who split their time between London and France's Bordeaux wine region. Jack has a younger brother, Thomas, who is also an Old Etonian. After completion of his studies at Stowe School, Brooksbank worked in hospitality and management at establishments such as the Mahiki club and the Markham Inn gastropub. His first job after leaving school was in service at the Admiral Codrington pub in Chelsea.

The couple had been dating for seven years and they were first introduced by friends in a ski break in Verbier, Switzerland, where Brooksbank was working at the time.

On 22 January 2018, Buckingham Palace announced that they would marry in the autumn. They were engaged earlier the same month while in Nicaragua with Brooksbank giving the Princess an oval-cut Padparadscha sapphire surrounded by a halo of diamonds set on a gold band with two further diamonds on the shoulders. The ring bears a striking similarity to the engagement ring of Princess Eugenie's mother. Its value is estimated to be between $30,000 and $150,000.

Although Eugenie is a member of the British royal family, she does not require the Queen's permission to marry. (Note: Under the Royal Marriages Act 1772, descendants of George II of Great Britain in the line of succession required the consent of the monarch to contract a legally-valid marriage. The restriction was removed under the Succession to the Crown Act 2013, but the latter states that if any of the first six persons in the line of succession marry without the Sovereign's consent, they and their children are removed from the line of succession.) The Duke of York and Sarah, Duchess of York expressed their delight at the news and the British Prime Minister Theresa May congratulated the couple on her Twitter account. After the announcement the couple gave an interview to Matt Baker of BBC One. The official engagement photographs were taken in the Picture gallery at Buckingham Palace. During the public announcement of the engagement, Eugenie wore a floral Erdem cocktail dress to coordinate with the pink sapphire engagement ring. She had previously worn the dress for a 2016 interview with Harper's Bazaar.

To mark the wedding of Eugenie and Jack, the Royal Collection Trust produced an official range of commemorative china, showing a monogram surmounted by the coronet of Princess Eugenie, alongside the couple's entwined monogram.

During the week preceding the wedding, Buckingham Palace and the Duke of York shared family photographs to commemorate the wedding. The couple gave a final interview to ITV's This Morning on 11 October 2018, released before the live coverage of the wedding.

== Wedding ==
=== Planning ===
The Duke of York announced shortly after the engagement announcement that the wedding would be held on Friday, 12 October 2018. Eugenie, who is a supporter of charities that battle plastic pollution, stated that she was organising a plastic-free wedding ceremony. The couple reportedly hired Peregrine Armstrong-Jones, founder of Bentley's Entertainment and half-brother of Princess Margaret's husband, the Earl of Snowdon, to plan the wedding parties. Rob Van Helden designed an autumnal floral theme for the ceremony using roses, hydrangeas, dahlias and berries from Windsor Great Park. The Duke of York later described the event as a family wedding, rather than a public one.

=== Venue ===
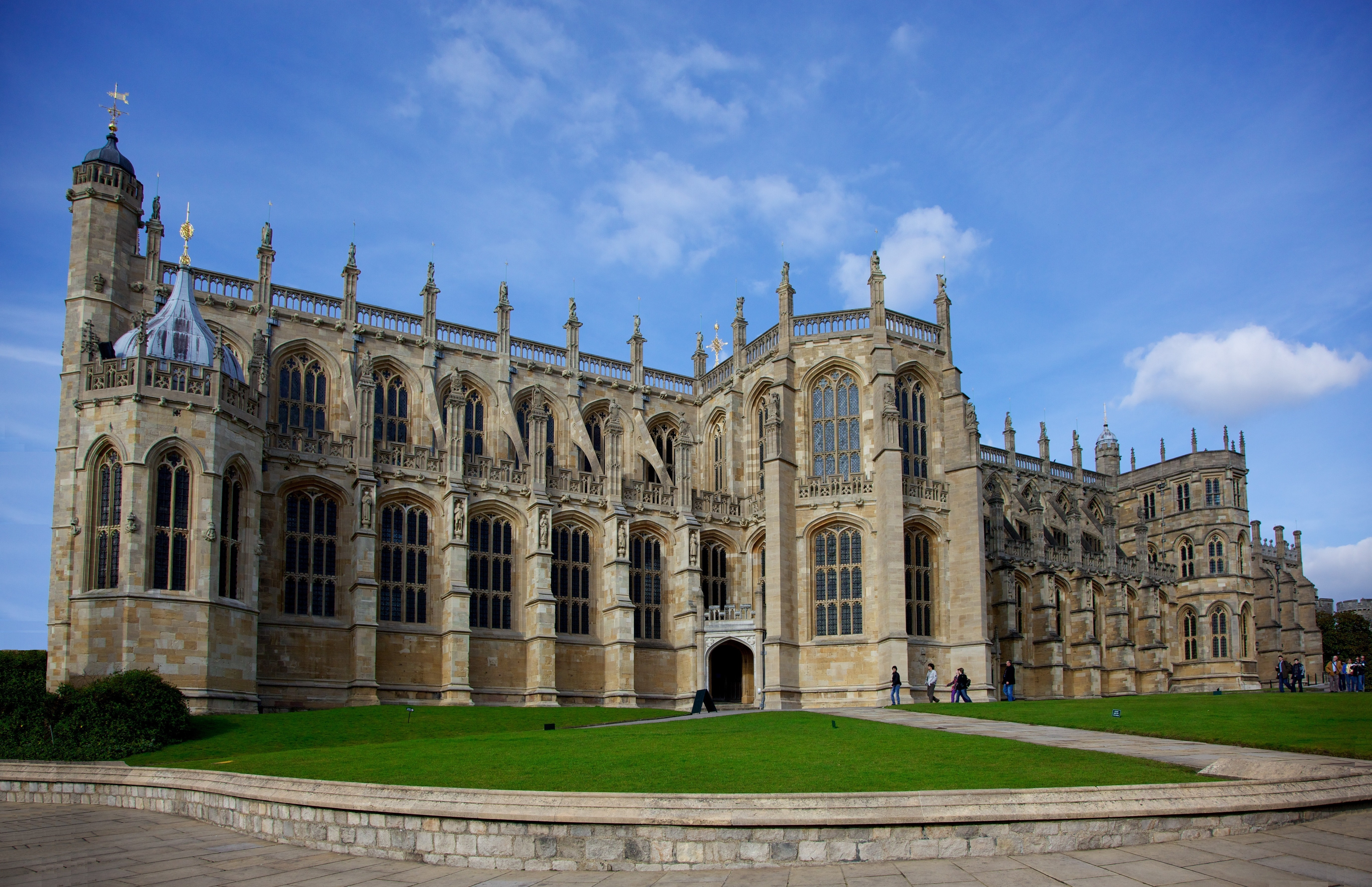
St George's Chapel, Windsor Castle

After the engagement announcement, it was announced that the wedding would take place in autumn 2018 at St George's Chapel, Windsor, a few months after the wedding of her cousin, Prince Harry, making it the second royal wedding at the chapel that year. The venue was the site for the weddings of her uncle the Earl of Wessex and cousin Peter Phillips and the blessing for the second marriage of her uncle the Prince of Wales. The Duke of York later revealed that it was the Queen who suggested St George's Chapel to be used as the venue for the ceremony.

=== Cost ===
The wedding and the parties were paid for privately by the bride's parents and family, not by the public as commonly thought. The royal family also paid for flowers, entertainment and the dress.

Experts expected the wedding to cost the public around £2 million due to security, Thames Valley Police having confirmed they would be responsible for security on the day. The cost of providing security was expected to be lower than for the weddings of Princes William and Harry, but an exact estimate has not been given. Thames Valley Police were expected to use a special grant provided by the tax payer to cover its costs. Windsor and Maidenhead Borough Council was to spend money on stewarding and setting up parking, and were expected to receive a government reimbursement. This caused controversy across the country with many people, including Labour Party Members of Parliament Emma Dent Coad and Chris Williamson, claiming they should not contribute. Republic, an anti-monarchist group, launched a petition asking the House of Commons to withdraw public funding for the wedding. The petition received around 50,000 signatures.

=== Wedding attire ===
The wedding invitations specified a dress code for men of "dress, morning coat" and for women, "day dress and hat".

==== Bride and bridal attendants ====
The bride wore a long-sleeved ivory "open-back" dress with folded shoulders and flowing full length train designed by Peter Pilotto and Christopher de Vos. Eugenie, who did not wear any veil, wanted her scar from the scoliosis operation that she had undergone at the age of 12 to be revealed. The bride also wore a pair of diamond and emerald earrings, gifted to her by Brooksbank. The Queen lent her granddaughter the Greville Emerald Kokoshnik Tiara, which was made in 1919 by Boucheron for Dame Margaret Greville and bequeathed by Mrs. Greville to Queen Elizabeth the Queen Mother in 1942. It features "brilliant and rose cut diamonds pavé set in platinum, with six emeralds on either side". For the customary bridal themes of "Something old, something new, something borrowed, something blue", Eugenie had her emerald drop earrings (the "new"), the Queen's tiara (the "borrowed" and "old".), and a handful of "blue thistle flowers" in her bouquet (the "blue"). Hairstylist Sonny-Jo MacFarlane styled Eugenie's hair in a "loose chignon". The bride wore shoes by Charlotte Olympia. Her bouquet, created by Patrice Van Helden Oakes, consisted of "Lily of the Valley, Stephanotis pips, hints of baby blue thistles, white spray roses, trailing ivy, and sprigs of myrtle from Osborne House". After the wedding the bridal bouquet was placed on the Tomb of the Unknown Warrior at Westminster Abbey, following royal tradition that began with the Queen Mother. Bobbi Brown make-up artist Hannah Martin did Eugenie's make-up for the ceremony.

Maid of honour Princess Beatrice wore an outfit by Ralph & Russo and a hat by Sarah Cant. The bridesmaids and pageboys wore dresses and uniforms designed by Amaia Arrieta. The design incorporates the Mark Bradford artwork included in the Order of Service. The bridesmaids carried flowers by Rob Van Helden similar to that of the bride's bouquet. The special attendant, Lady Louise Mountbatten-Windsor, wore a dress by Claudie Pierlot and a hat by Emily London.

==== Groom and best man ====
The groom and the best man wore morning dress with tie pins given to them by Eugenie which featured "the white rose of York and the Padparadscha sapphire".

=== Wedding party ===
Eugenie picked her sister, Princess Beatrice of York, as maid of honour after having previously announced it in a Vogue interview in August. Thomas Brooksbank, brother of the groom, was his best man, and that the bridesmaids and page boys would all be children. A total of six bridesmaids and two page boys were chosen: Eugenie's godchild, Maud Windsor, daughter of Lord and Lady Frederick Windsor, her cousin Peter Phillips' daughters Isla and Savannah Phillips, her cousin Zara Tindall's eldest daughter Mia Tindall, her cousin the Duke of Cambridge's eldest children Prince George and Princess Charlotte, as well as Theodora Williams, daughter of Ayda Field and Robbie Williams, and Louis de Givenchy, son of Olivier and Zoë de Givenchy. Eugenie's cousins Lady Louise Mountbatten-Windsor and James, Viscount Severn were special attendants.

Members of the Nijmegen Company Grenadier Guards, of which the Duke of York is Colonel, lined the West Steps of the chapel as the couple depart for their carriage procession.

=== Wedding service ===
External videos
- The wedding of Princess Eugenie and Jack Brooksbank: Full Ceremony (external video)

On 14 September 2018, the palace announced that the ceremony would commence at 11:00am. Members of the royal family started to arrive at the chapel at 10:25am. The Queen and the Duke of Edinburgh were the last members of the royal family to depart for the ceremony, as is traditional, arriving at the chapel at 10.52am. Shortly after, the bride arrived in a 1977 Rolls-Royce Phantom VI and proceeded down the aisle escorted by her father. He accompanied her through the Nave to the Organ Screen, where the groom and the best man were standing. After the introduction had been read by the dean of Windsor, the couple along with the best man and the bride's father were led through the Quire Gates and into the Quire of the Chapel.

It had been announced that the Dean of Windsor, David Conner, would give the address at their wedding. The dean also officiated as the couple made their marriage vows. The Archbishop of York, John Sentamu, had written a personal prayer for the service, which was included in the Order of Service.

Brooksbank's first cousin, Charles Brooksbank, gave the first reading taken from St Paul's Letter to the Colossians (Chapter 3, verses 12–16), followed by another reading by Princess Beatrice of York taken from The Great Gatsby.

The marriage vows were those published in Common Worship, and included the promise "to love and to cherish" each other. This was sealed by putting a ring on the fourth finger of bride's left hand. The ring is made out of the Welsh gold. After the signing of the registers, Eugenie and Brooksbank together with the guests sang the national anthem. The couple paused briefly to bow and curtsey to the Queen before walking down the aisle. They were followed in procession by other members of the bridal party and by their families. The couple shared a kiss on the steps outside the chapel.

=== Music ===
Members of the Royal Philharmonic Orchestra and the State Trumpeter of the Household Cavalry trumpeters provided music for the service. James Vivian, the Director of Music at St George's Chapel, prepared two hymns exclusively for the couple. Hymns sung at the wedding included "Glorious Things of Thee Are Spoken" words by John Newton, tune Abbot's Leigh; "Immortal, Invisible, God Only Wise" words by Walter Chalmers Smith, tune "St Denio"; and Love Divine, All Loves Excelling words by Charles Wesley, tune Blaenwerm.

Andrea Bocelli also performed two pieces: the Bach/Gounod Ave Maria, and Panis angelicus by César Franck. During the signing of the registers, the choir sang Ubi caritas from Quatre Motets sur des thèmes grégoriens by Maurice Duruflé and "My spirit sang all day" by Gerald Finzi. The Scots Guards performed as a personal link to Brooksbank's great-grandfather, Sir Jack Coke, who was an officer in the regiment. As the couple departed the chapel for the carriage procession, pipers from the 2nd Battalion of the Royal Regiment of Scotland performed "Scottish pieces" from the Garter Tower.

The recessional was the Final from the Symphonie No 1 by Louis Vierne.

=== Family celebrations ===
There was a carriage procession through Windsor after the ceremony in the Scottish State Coach, "leaving Castle Hill and proceeding along part of the High Street before returning to the castle via Cambridge Gate". The couple decided to use an enclosed carriage due to windy weather. An estimated crowd of 3,000 people lined the streets to watch the couple during the procession. There was a reception hosted by the Queen at Windsor Castle. The Duke of York is said to have delivered a speech at the reception. This was followed by a black-tie reception that evening at Royal Lodge, the Duke of York's official residence, with a third celebration the next day hosted by the bride's parents. Brooksbank drove his new wife to the reception at the Royal Lodge in a silver Aston Martin DB10, one of the eight models made for the 2015 James Bond movie Spectre. For the evening reception, Princess Eugenie wore a silk gown designed by Zac Posen. The "pin-tucked plisse" dress was "cut on the bias and mixed with signature drapes", and "the White Rose of York was embroidered on both the shoulder and back which held together the cape". Biddle Sawyer Silks provided the silk for the gown. The blush gown was inspired by an outfit worn by Grace Kelly in the 1955 movie To Catch a Thief. Eugenie adorned her hair with a hair slide that belongs to the Queen. It was originally commissioned by King William IV in 1830 for Queen Adelaide. The Wheat-Ear brooches were passed to the Queen in 1952. The monarch has since worn them as both hair slides and brooches.

The wedding cake was a 5-tier red velvet and chocolate cake made by London-based cake designer Sophie Cabot.

Four official wedding photos taken by Alex Bramall were released the day after the ceremony. Two of them were taken at Windsor Castle following the wedding service, while the third one showed the couple inside the Scottish State Coach, and the fourth one was taken at the Royal Lodge, during the private black-tie reception.

== Guests ==
=== Relatives of the bride ===
==== House of Windsor ====
- The Queen and the Duke of Edinburgh, the bride's paternal grandparents
  - The Duke of York and Sarah, Duchess of York, the bride's parents
    - Princess Beatrice of York, the bride's sister
  - The Prince of Wales, the bride's paternal uncle
    - The Duke and Duchess of Cambridge, the bride's first cousin and his wife
      - Prince George of Cambridge, the bride's first cousin once removed
      - Princess Charlotte of Cambridge, the bride's first cousin once removed
    - The Duke and Duchess of Sussex, the bride's first cousin and his wife
  - The Princess Royal and Vice Admiral Sir Timothy Laurence, the bride's paternal aunt and uncle
    - Peter and Autumn Phillips, the bride's first cousin and his wife
      - Savannah Phillips, the bride's first cousin once removed
      - Isla Phillips, the bride's first cousin once removed
    - Zara and Michael Tindall, the bride's first cousin and her husband
      - Mia Tindall, the bride's first cousin once removed
  - The Earl and Countess of Wessex, the bride's paternal uncle and aunt
    - Lady Louise Mountbatten-Windsor, the bride's first cousin
    - Viscount Severn, the bride's first cousin
- The Princess Margaret, Countess of Snowdon's family:
  - The Earl and Countess of Snowdon, the bride's first cousin once removed and his wife
    - Viscount Linley, the bride's second cousin
    - Lady Margarita Armstrong-Jones, the bride's second cousin
  - Lady Sarah and Daniel Chatto, the bride's first cousin once removed and her husband

Other descendants of Princess Eugenie's great-great-grandfather King George V and their families:

- The Duke and Duchess of Gloucester, the bride's first cousin twice removed and his wife
- The Duke of Kent, the bride's first cousin twice removed
  - Lady Helen and Timothy Taylor, the bride's second cousin once removed and her husband
- Princess Alexandra, The Hon. Lady Ogilvy's family:
  - James Ogilvy, the bride's second cousin once removed and godfather
  - Marina Ogilvy's family:
    - Zenouska Mowatt, the bride's third cousin
- Prince and Princess Michael of Kent, the bride's first cousin twice removed and his wife
  - Lord and Lady Frederick Windsor, the bride's second cousin once removed and his wife
    - Maud Windsor, the bride's third cousin and goddaughter
  - Lady Gabriella Windsor and Thomas Kingston, the bride's second cousin once removed and her fiancé

==== Ferguson family ====
- Jane Luedecke and Ramin Marzbani, the bride's maternal aunt and her guest
  - Seamus Makim, the bride's first cousin
  - Ayesha Makim, the bride's first cousin
  - Heidi Luedecke, the bride's first cousin
  - Nikki Marzbani
- Lady Swinburn, the bride's maternal step-grandmother
  - Andrew Ferguson and Florence Hill, the bride's maternal half-uncle and his fiancée
  - Elizabeth and Henry Coob, the bride's maternal half-aunt and uncle

==== Mountbatten family ====
- The Marquess and Marchioness of Milford Haven, the bride's paternal second cousin once removed and his wife
  - Lady Tatiana Mountbatten, the bride's third cousin
  - Earl of Medina, the bride's third cousin
  - Harry Wentworth-Stanley, the Marchioness' son
  - Louisa Wentworth-Stanley, the Marchioness' daughter

==== Bowes-Lyon family ====
- Lady Elizabeth Shakerley , the bride's second cousin once removed

=== Relatives of the groom ===
- George and Nicola Brooksbank, the groom's parents
  - Thomas Brooksbank, the groom's brother
- David Brooksbank, the groom's paternal uncle
  - Scott Brooksbank, the groom's first cousin
  - Charles Brooksbank, the groom's first cousin
  - Anne Brooksbank, the groom's first cousin
- Sir Nicholas and Lady Brooksbank, the groom's paternal first cousin once removed and his wife
  - Thomas Brooksbank, the groom's second cousin
  - Victoria Brooksbank, the groom's second cousin

=== Foreign non-reigning royalty and nobility ===
==== House of Schleswig-Holstein-Sonderburg-Glucksburg ====
- Crown Prince and Crown Princess of Greece, the bride's paternal third cousin and his wife
  - Princess Maria-Olympia of Greece and Denmark, the bride's third cousin once removed
- Prince Philippos of Greece and Denmark and Nina Flohr, the bride's paternal third cousin and his guest

==== House of Hanover ====
- The Hereditary Prince and Hereditary Princess of Hanover, the bride's fourth cousin and his wife
- Prince and Princess Christian of Hanover, the bride's fourth cousin and his wife

==== House of Oettingen-Spielberg ====
- The Hereditary Prince and Hereditary Princess of Oettingen-Oettingen and Oettingen-Spielberg
- Princess Nora, Lady Max Percy and Lord Max Percy

==== House of Bismarck ====
- Countess Debonnarie von Bismarck-Schonhausen
- Count Nikolai von Bismarck-Schonhausen

=== Religious figures ===
- The Rt Rev David Conner, Dean of Windsor
- The Most Rev. and Rt Hon John Sentamu, Archbishop of York

=== Friends of Princess Eugenie of York and Jack Brooksbank ===
- Freddie Andrews
- Alessandra Ford Balzs
- Amit Bhatia
- Derek Blasberg
- Hayley Bloomingdale
- Julia de Boinville (friend and colleague of Princess Eugenie)
- Cressida Bonas (friend of Princess Eugenie) and her guest
- Holly Branson
- Emily Few Brown
- Laura Brown
- Maria Tereza Turrion Burallo
- Jacobi Anstruther-Gough-Calthorpe
- Arnaud Cauchois
- Maddie Chesterton
- Chelsy Davy
- Lauren De Niro Pipher
- Charles and Chloe Delevingne (father and sister of models Cara and Poppy Delevingne), and Chloe's husband, Edward Grant
- Sam Dougal
- Viscount Erleigh (older brother of Natasha Rufus Isaacs)
- Hum Fleming
- Georgia Forbes
- Irene and Lydia Forte
- Sabine and Joseph Getty
- Olivier and Zoë de Givenchy (parents of page boy Louis de Givenchy)
- Jane Gottschalk
- Rianne ten Haken
- Charlie and Yoanna Hanbury
- Astrid and Davina Harbord
- Chantal Hochuli (ex-wife of Prince Ernst August of Hanover)
- Rory Hoddell
- Edward Lawson Johnston
- Heather Kerzner
- Saloni Lodha
- Frederica Lowell-Pank
- Cavan Mahony Linde
- Elizabeth Mason
- Pippa and James Matthews (sister and brother-in-law of the Duchess of Cambridge)
- James Middleton (brother of the Duchess of Cambridge)
- Alice and Thomas Philip Naylor-Leyland
- Eugenie Niarchos
- Misha Nonoo
- Edgar Osorio
- Kaki Paige
- David Peacock
- Gabriella Peacock
- Guy Pelly and his wife, Lizzie Wilson
- Lady Melissa Percy (daughter of the 12th Duke of Northumberland])
- Annina Pfuel
- Emma Pilkington
- Natalie Pinkham
- Ollie Proudlock and his fiancée, Emma Louise Connolly
- Jamie Richards
- Lavinia Richards
- Jamie Ryde
- Natasha Rufus Isaacs and husband, Rupert Finch
- Caroline Sieber
- Hannah Schuster
- Harriet Stewart
- Alexander Stileman
- Charlie van Straubenzee
- Daisy van Straubenzee
- Lady Tang
- Edward Tang
- Joan Templeman
- Owain Walbyoff
- Martha Ward
- Susanna Warren
- Fritz von Westenholz
- The Duke of Westminster
- Molly Whitehall

=== Celebrity and other notable guests of the couple ===
- Isabella Anstruther-Gough-Calthorpe and her husband, Sam Branson
- Surinder Arora
- Richard Bacon and his wife, Rebecca MacFarlane
- Tamara Beckwith and her husband, Giorgio Veroni
- Andrea Bocelli, his wife Veronica Berti, and sons
- Arpad Busson
- Naomi Campbell
- Jimmy Carr and his girlfriend, Karoline Copping
- Edei
- David Emanuel (designed the wedding dress of Diana, Princess of Wales)
- The Lord and Lady Fellowes of West Stafford
- Pixie Geldof and her husband, George Barnett
- Kate Moss and her daughter Lila-Grace Moss
- CK Cheung
- Manuel Fernandez
- Stephen Fry and his husband, Elliot Spencer
- Mark Guiducci, former editor-in-chief of Vogue
- Subodh Gupta
- Edward Hutley
- Tarek Kaituni
- Evgeny Lebedev
- Richard Liu
- Paddy McNally
- Liv Tyler and her partner, David Gardner
- Demi Moore and Eric Buterbaugh
- James Blunt and his wife, Sophie Wellesley (Wellesley is the granddaughter of the 8th Duke of Wellington)
- Ellie Goulding and her fiancé, Caspar Jopling
- Cara Delevingne with Derek Blasberg
- Poppy Delevingne and her husband, James Cook
- Tracey Emin
- Robbie Williams and Ayda Field, with Gwen Field
- Rudolf Maag
- Ricky Martin and his husband, Jwan Yosef
- Zac Posen and his mother, Susan
- Jamie Redknapp
- Holly Valance and her husband, Nick Candy
- Jack Whitehall
- Philip Winser
- Iwan Wirth (Princess Eugenie's boss)

=== Charities ===
Princess Eugenie and Jack Brooksbank invited representatives from charities and organisations that they support.

==== Healthcare and young people ====
- Royal National Orthopaedic Hospital
- Teenage Cancer Trust
- Street Child

==== Anti-slavery ====
- The Salvation Army
- The UN Trust Fund to End Violence Against Women ref name="RoyalCharities2018" />
- Key to Freedom

==== Military ====
- Supporting Wounded Veterans

==== Animals and conservation ====
- The Big Cat Sanctuary
- Elephant Family
- Project 0
- Charity: water

==== The Arts ====
- The Print Room at The Coronet
- Tate Young Patrons

=== Bridal party ===
==== Best man ====
- Thomas Brooksbank, brother of the groom

==== Maid of honour ====
- Princess Beatrice of York, the sister of bride

==== Bridesmaids and page boys ====
- Prince George of Cambridge, aged 5 – son of The Duke and Duchess of Cambridge
- Princess Charlotte of Cambridge, aged 3 – daughter of The Duke and Duchess of Cambridge
- Louis de Givenchy, aged 6 – son of Zoe and Olivier de Givenchy
- Savannah Phillips, aged 7 – daughter of Peter and Autumn Phillips
- Isla Phillips, aged 6 – daughter of Peter and Autumn Phillips
- Mia Tindall, aged 4 – daughter of Zara and Michael Tindall
- Theodora Williams, aged 6 – daughter of Ayda Field and Robbie Williams
- Maud Windsor, aged 5 – daughter of Lord and Lady Frederick Windsor

==== Special attendants ====
- Lady Louise Mountbatten-Windsor, the bride's paternal first cousin
- Viscount Severn, the bride's first cousin

=== Notable absences ===
- The Duchess of Cornwall, the bride's paternal aunt by marriage, previous engagement in Scotland
- The Duchess of Kent, the wife of the bride's paternal first cousin twice removed, semi-retired
- Princess Alexandra, The Hon. Lady Ogilvy, the bride's paternal first cousin twice removed, broken arm

== Coverage ==
Coverage of the royal wedding in the United Kingdom was shown on ITV's This Morning, hosted by Eamonn Holmes and Ruth Langsford. An average audience of 3 million people watched the wedding coverage on ITV, the channel's best ratings for the time slot since the wedding of Prince William and Catherine Middleton in 2011. The BBC did not broadcast the ceremony live, but they had full coverage across their news services. Sky News also reported the highlights of the event.

In the United States, a simulcast of ITV's coverage of the wedding and carriage procession was shown live exclusively on cable network TLC beginning at 4:25 AM EDT. It was then rebroadcast in its entirety beginning at 7:25 AM EDT. Both broadcasts aired on a three-hour tape delay in the west coast. The network also made their full wedding coverage available on their TLC Go mobile app at the conclusion of the live airing.

In Australia, the wedding was broadcast on Channel 7, starting at 8:00 PM Sydney time. The coverage was watched by 1.5 million viewers nationally, making it the highest rated program on Australian television for the day.

On 10 October, Buckingham Palace confirmed that the wedding would be streamed live on the royal family's and the Duke of York's media channels beginning at 10:00 AM (BST). Live updates and material were also released throughout the day.

== Title ==
Since the wedding, the Court Circular has used the style "Princess Eugenie, Mrs Jack Brooksbank".

Although it was speculated that Jack Brooksbank would receive the title Earl of Northallerton, such rumours were dismissed by representatives of the York family.

== Honeymoon ==
It is not clear when the couple left for their honeymoon. The location of the honeymoon was kept secret; the press speculated they might have been heading to Switzerland, Nicaragua, Italy, the Caribbean, and the Seychelles.

== See also ==
- List of royal weddings
