= Mountbatten family =

British noble family of German origin

Mountbatten
- German-British noble family
- Coat of arms
- Parent family: Battenberg branch of the House of Hesse-Darmstadt
- Origin: Grand Duchy of Hesse
- Founded: 14 July 1917; 109 years ago
- Current head: George Mountbatten, 4th Marquess of Milford Haven
- Titles: Extant titles: Marquess of Milford Haven; Earl Mountbatten of Burma; Extinct titles: Marquess of Carisbrooke
- Connected members: Louis Mountbatten, 1st Marquess of Milford Haven; Prince Philip, Duke of Edinburgh; King Charles III of the United Kingdom; Queen Louise of Sweden; Louis Mountbatten, 1st Earl Mountbatten of Burma
- Connected families: House of Windsor; House of Hesse; House of Glücksburg; House of Bernadotte
- Cadet branches: Mountbatten-Windsor; (by cognatic descent)

The Mountbatten family is a British family that originated as a branch of the German princely Battenberg family. The name was adopted by members of the Battenberg family residing in the United Kingdom on 14 July 1917, three days before the British royal family changed its name from Saxe-Coburg and Gotha to Windsor. This was due to rising anti-German sentiment among the British public during World War I. The name is a direct Anglicisation of the German name Battenberg, which refers to a small town in Hesse. The Battenberg family was a morganatic line of the House of Hesse-Darmstadt, itself a cadet branch of the House of Hesse.

The family includes the Marquesses of Milford Haven (and formerly the Marquesses of Carisbrooke), as well as the Earls Mountbatten of Burma. The late Prince Philip, Duke of Edinburgh, consort of Queen Elizabeth II, adopted the surname of Mountbatten from his mother's family in 1947, although he was a member of the House of Glücksburg by patrilineal descent. Another prominent member of the family was Lady Louise Mountbatten, who became Queen consort of Sweden after her husband ascended the Swedish throne as King Gustaf VI Adolf in 1950.

== Origins ==
The Mountbatten family is a branch of the German house of Battenberg. The latter family was a morganatic branch of the House of Hesse-Darmstadt, which formerly ruled the Grand Duchy of Hesse in what is now Germany. The first member of the Battenberg family was Julia Hauke, whose brother-in-law (Grand Duke Louis III of Hesse) created her Countess of Battenberg with the style of Illustrious Highness (HIllH) in 1851, on the occasion of her morganatic marriage to Grand Duke Louis' brother, Prince Alexander of Hesse and by Rhine. In 1858, Julia was elevated in title to Princess of Battenberg, with the style of Serene Highness (HSH).

Two of Alexander and Julia's sons, Prince Henry of Battenberg and Prince Louis of Battenberg, became associated with the British royal family. Prince Henry married The Princess Beatrice, youngest daughter of Queen Victoria. Prince Louis married Victoria's granddaughter, Princess Victoria of Hesse and by Rhine, and became First Sea Lord of the Royal Navy.

Due to anti-German feelings prevalent in Britain during World War I, Prince Louis, his children and his nephews (the two living sons of Prince Henry) renounced their German titles and changed their name to the more English-sounding Mountbatten. (They had considered an alternative translation, "Battenhill", but later rejected it). Their cousin George V compensated the princes with British peerages. Prince Louis became the 1st Marquess of Milford Haven, while Prince Alexander, Prince Henry's eldest son, became the 1st Marquess of Carisbrooke.

== Members ==
=== Marquesses of Milford Haven ===
Louis Mountbatten, 1st Marquess of Milford Haven

The Marquessate of Milford Haven was created in 1917 for Prince Louis of Battenberg, the former First Sea Lord, and a relation to the British royal family. He was at the same time made Earl of Medina and Viscount Alderney, also in the Peerage of the United Kingdom. Princess Alice of Battenberg never took the name Mountbatten as she married Prince Andrew of Greece and Denmark in 1903; her son, Prince Philip of Greece and Denmark, took the name upon becoming a naturalised British citizen.

- Louis Mountbatten, 1st Marquess of Milford Haven (1854–1921) m. Princess Victoria of Hesse and by Rhine
  - Princess Alice of Battenberg (1885–1969) m. Prince Andrew of Greece and Denmark, son of King George I of Greece
    - Princess Margarita of Greece and Denmark (1905–1981) m. Gottfried, Prince of Hohenlohe-Langenburg
    - Princess Theodora of Greece and Denmark (1906–1969) m. Berthold, Margrave of Baden
    - Princess Cecilie of Greece and Denmark (1911–1937) m. Georg Donatus, Hereditary Grand Duke of Hesse
    - Princess Sophie of Greece and Denmark (1914–2001) m. Prince Christoph of Hesse d. 1943, m. Prince George William of Hanover
    - Prince Philip of Greece and Denmark (1921–2021), m. Elizabeth II of the United Kingdom
  - Lady Louise Mountbatten (1889–1965) m. Gustaf VI Adolf of Sweden
  - George Mountbatten, 2nd Marquess of Milford Haven (1892–1938) m. Countess Nadejda Mikhailovna de Torby
    - Lady Tatiana Mountbatten (1917–1988)
    - David Mountbatten, 3rd Marquess of Milford Haven (1919–1970) m. Romaine Dahlgren Pierce div. 1954, m. Janet Mercedes Bryce
      - George Mountbatten, 4th Marquess of Milford Haven (b. 1961) m. Sarah Georgina Walker div. 1996, m. Clare Steel
        - Lady Tatiana Dru (b. 1990) m. Alexander Dru
          - Elodie Dru (b. 2023)
          - Auberon Dru (b. 2025)
        - Henry Mountbatten, Earl of Medina (b. 1991)
      - Lord Ivar Mountbatten (b. 1963) m. Penelope Anne Vere Thompson div. 2011, m. James Coyle
        - Ella Mountbatten (b. 1996)
        - Alexandra Mountbatten (b. 1998)
        - Louise Mountbatten (b. 2002)
  - Louis Mountbatten, 1st Earl Mountbatten of Burma (1900–1979) m. Edwina Ashley
    - Patricia Knatchbull, 2nd Countess Mountbatten of Burma (1924–2017) m. John Knatchbull, 7th Baron Brabourne
    - Lady Pamela Hicks (1929–2026) m. David Nightingale Hicks

The heir apparent to the marquessate is the present holder's son Henry Mountbatten, Earl of Medina (b. 1991)

The 1st Marquess's youngest daughter, Lady Louise Mountbatten, married the crown prince of Sweden in 1923. On his accession in 1950 as Gustaf VI Adolf of Sweden, Louise became Queen consort of Sweden.

=== Earls Mountbatten of Burma ===
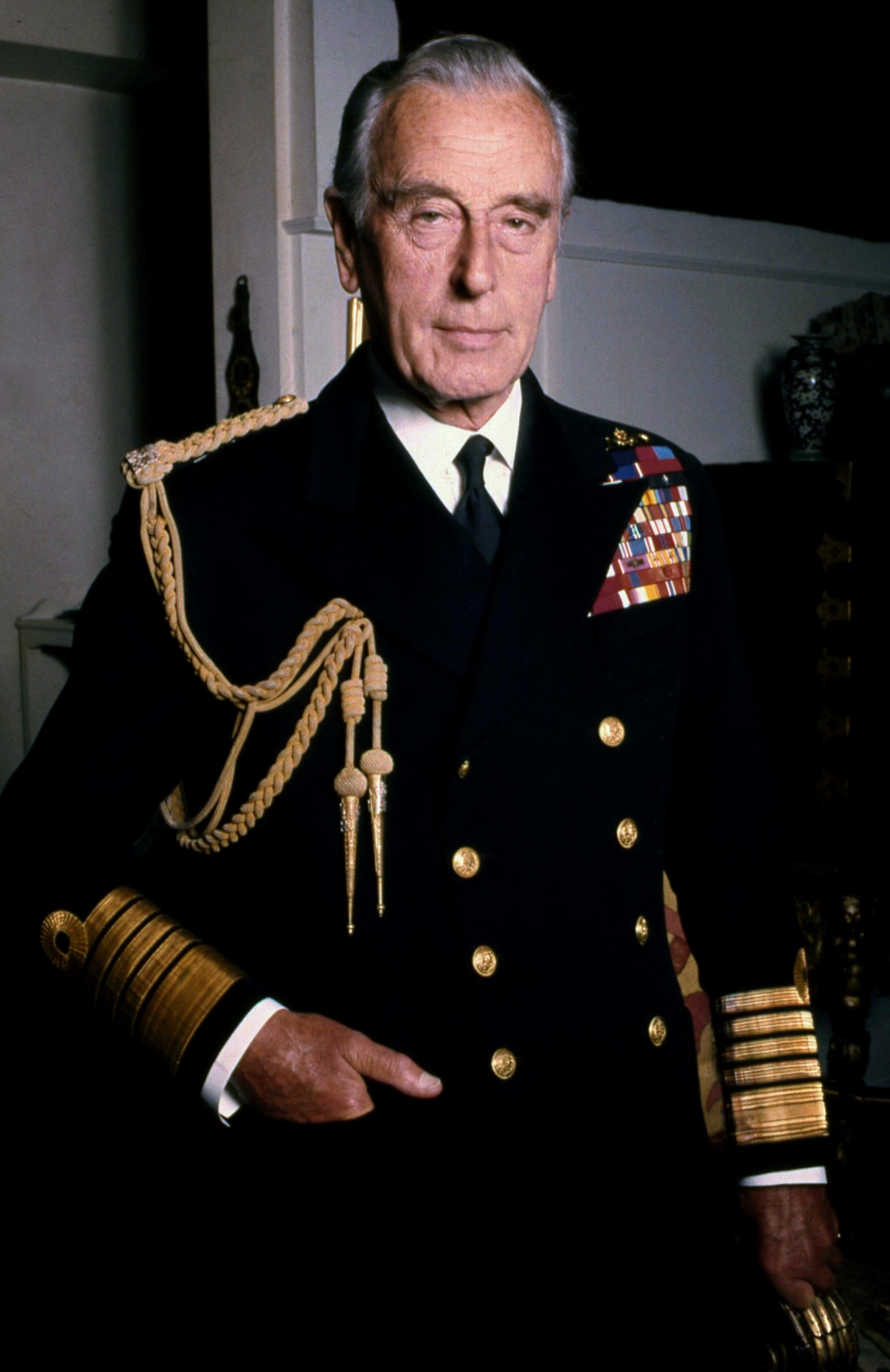
Louis Mountbatten, 1st Earl Mountbatten of Burma

Earl Mountbatten of Burma is a title in the Peerage of the United Kingdom, created in 1947 for Rear Admiral Louis Mountbatten, 1st Viscount Mountbatten of Burma, youngest son of the 1st Marquess of Milford Haven and the last Viceroy of India. The letters patent creating the title specified the following special remainder to his daughters. The subsidiary titles of the Earldom are Viscount Mountbatten of Burma, of Romsey in the County of Southampton, created 1946, and Baron Romsey, of Romsey in the County of Southampton, created in 1947. Both of these titles, in the Peerage of the United Kingdom, have the same special remainder as the Earldom.

- Louis Mountbatten, 1st Earl Mountbatten of Burma (1900–1979) m. Edwina Cynthia Annette Ashley, daughter of Wilfrid Ashley, 1st Baron Mount Temple and great-granddaughter of Anthony Ashley-Cooper, 7th Earl of Shaftesbury
  - Patricia Knatchbull, 2nd Countess Mountbatten of Burma (1924–2017) m. John Knatchbull, 7th Baron Brabourne
    - Norton Knatchbull, 3rd Earl Mountbatten of Burma (b. 1947) m. Penelope Eastwood
      - Nicholas Knatchbull, Lord Brabourne (b. 1981) m. Ambre Pouzet
        - The Hon. Alexander Knatchbull (b. 2022)
      - Lady Alexandra Hooper (b. 1982) m. Thomas Hooper
        - Inigo Norton Sebastian Mountbatten Hooper (b. 2017)
        - Alden Peter Theodore Mountbatten Hooper (b. 2020)
      - The Hon. Leonora Knatchbull (1986–1991)
    - The Hon. Michael-John Knatchbull (b. 1950) m. Melissa Clare Owen, div. 1997, m. Susan Penelope "Penny" Jane Coates, div. 2006
      - Kelly Knatchbull (b. 1988)
      - Savannah Knatchbull (b. 2001)
    - The Hon. Anthony Knatchbull (1952–1952)
    - Lady Joanna Zuckerman (b. 1955) m. Baron Hubert Pernot du Breuil, div. 1995, m. Azriel Zuckerman
      - Eleuthera Pernot du Breuil (b. 1986)
      - Alexander Zuckerman (b. 2002)
    - Lady Amanda Ellingworth (b. 1957) m. Charles Vincent Ellingworth
      - Luke Ellingworth (b. 1991)
      - Joseph Ellingworth (b. 1992)
      - Louis Ellingworth (b. 1995)
    - The Hon. Philip Knatchbull (b. 1961) m. Atalanta Cowan, div. 2000, m. Wendy Amanda Leach
      - Daisy Knatchbull (b. 1992)
      - Phoebe Knatchbull (b. 1995)
      - Frederick "Freddy" Knatchbull (b. 2003)
      - John Knatchbull (b. 2004)
    - The Hon. Nicholas Knatchbull (1964–1979)
    - The Hon. Timothy Knatchbull (b. 1964) m. Isabella Julia Norman
      - Amber Knatchbull (b. 2000)
      - Milo Knatchbull (b. 2001)
      - Ludovic Knatchbull (b. 2003)
      - Isla Knatchbull (b. 2005)
      - Wilhelmina Knatchbull (b. 2008)
  - Lady Pamela Hicks (1929−2026) m. David Nightingale Hicks
    - Edwina Brudenell (b. 1961) m. Jeremy Brudenell, div. 2004
      - Maddison May Brudenell (b. 1994)
      - Jordan Anne Brudenell (b. 1995)
      - Rowan Michael David Brudenell (b. 2001)
    - Ashley Hicks (b. 1963) m. Marina Allegra Federica Silvia Tondato, div. 2009, m. Kathryn Anne Sharkey, known as Kata de Solis, div. 2018
      - Angelica Hicks (b. 1992)
      - Ambrosia Hicks (b. 1997)
      - Caspian Hicks (b. 2018)
      - Horatio Hicks (b. 2019)
    - India Hicks (b. 1967) m. David Flint Wood
      - Wesley Flint Wood (b. 1996) (adopted)
      - Felix Flint Wood (b. 1997)
      - Amory Flint Wood (b. 1999)
      - Conrad Flint Wood (b. 2003)
      - Domino Flint Wood (b. 2007)

The heir apparent to the earldom is the present holder's son, Nicholas Knatchbull, Lord Brabourne (born 1981).

=== Marquess of Carisbrooke ===
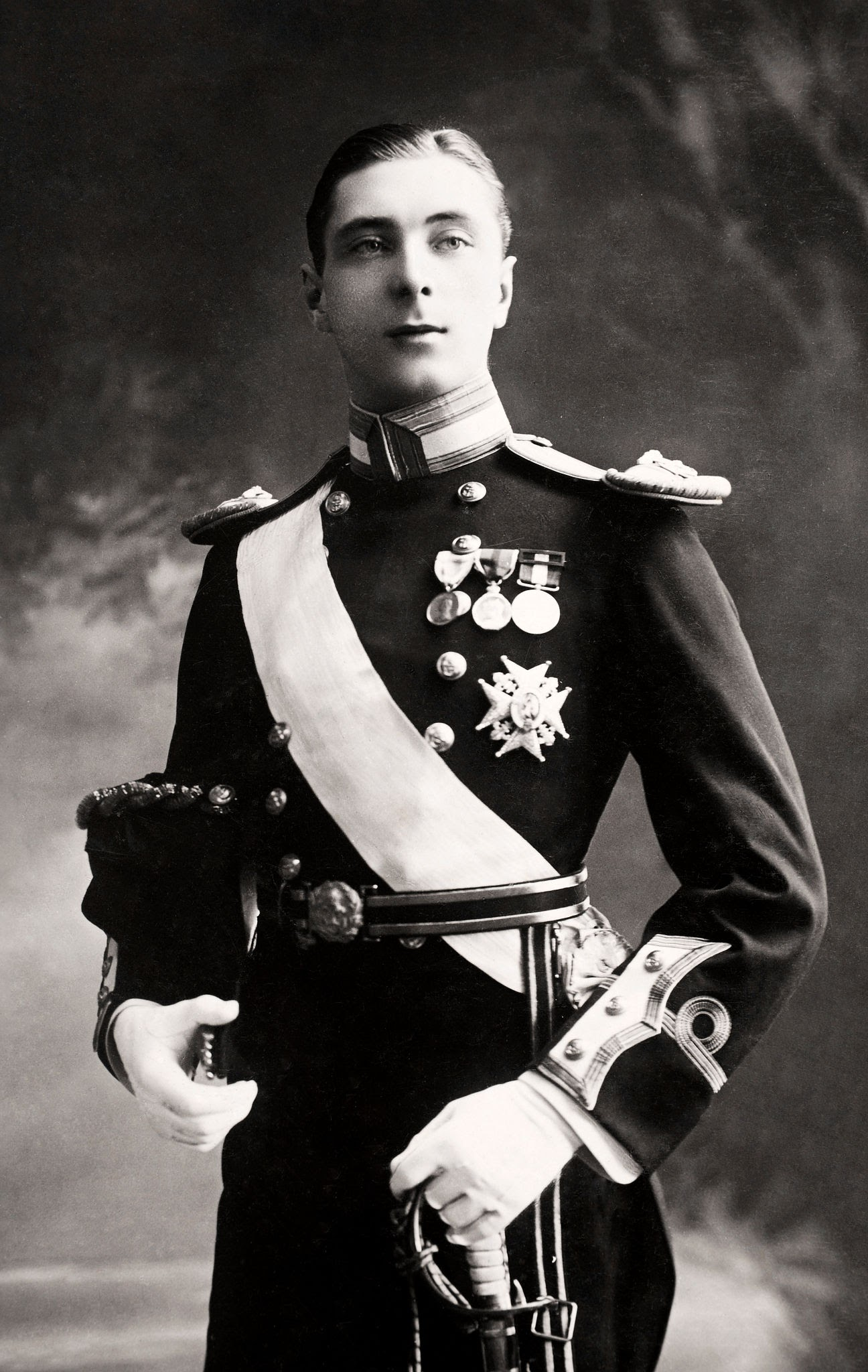
Alexander Mountbatten, 1st Marquess of Carisbrooke

Marquess of Carisbrooke was a title in the Peerage of the United Kingdom, created in 1917 for Prince Alexander of Battenberg, eldest son of Princess Beatrice of the United Kingdom and Prince Henry of Battenberg. He was made Viscount Launceston, in the County of Cornwall, and Earl of Berkhampsted at the same time, also in the Peerage of the United Kingdom. The titles became extinct upon Lord Carisbrooke's death in 1960, as he had no sons.

- Alexander Mountbatten, 1st Marquess of Carisbrooke (1886–1960) m. Lady Irene Denison, daughter of William Denison, 2nd Earl of Londesborough
  - Lady Iris Mountbatten (1920–1982) m. Captain Hamilton Joseph Keyes O'Malley, div. 1946, m. Michael Neely Bryan, div. 1957, m. William Alexander Kemp

His siblings were:

- Princess Victoria Eugenie of Battenberg (1887–1969), m. Alfonso XIII of Spain
- Lord Leopold Mountbatten (1889–1922)
- Prince Maurice of Battenberg (1891–1914)

=== Prince Philip, Duke of Edinburgh ===
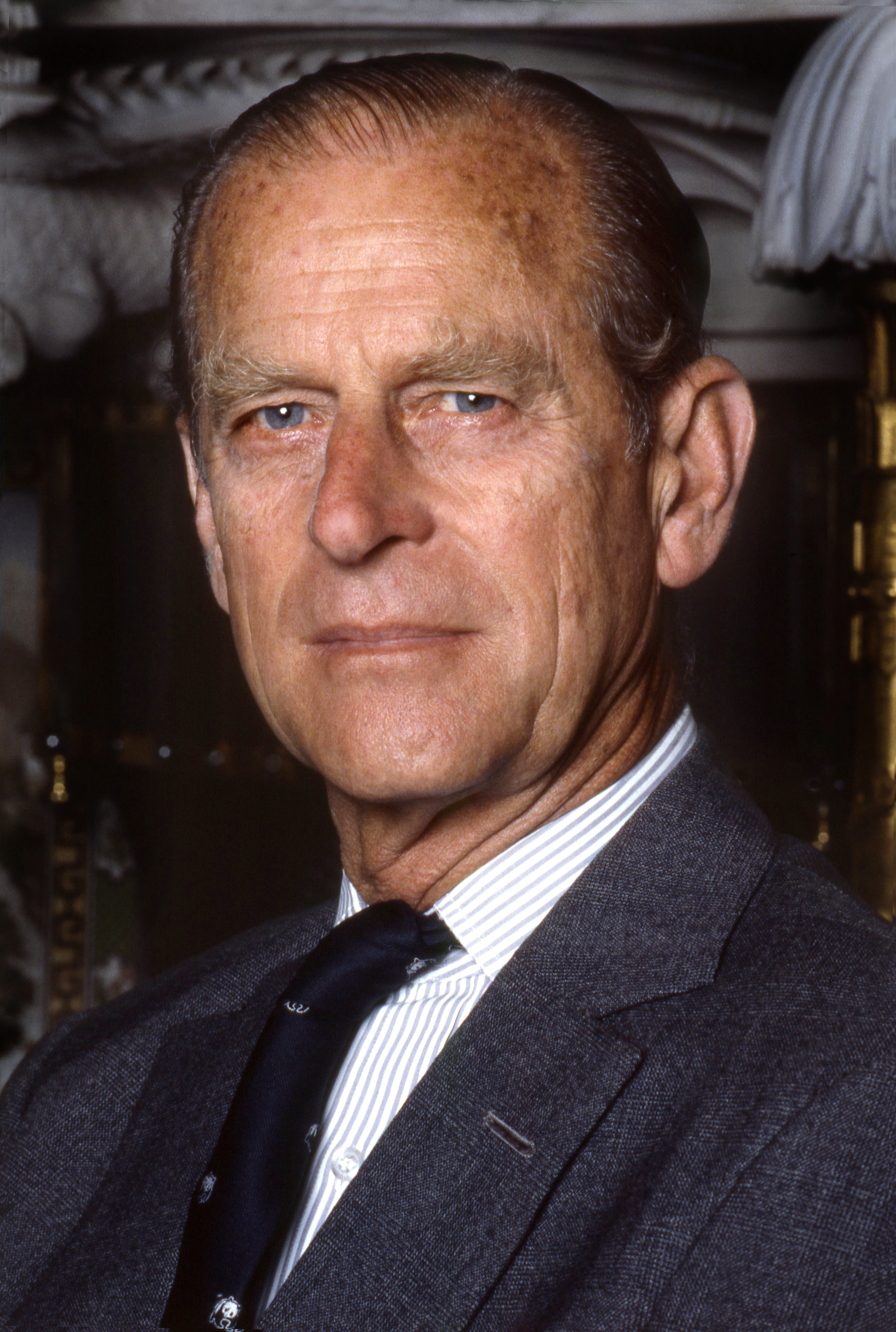
Prince Philip, Duke of Edinburgh

Prince Philip, Duke of Edinburgh, the son of Princess Alice of Battenberg and grandson of the 1st Marquess of Milford Haven, took the name Mountbatten when he became a naturalised British subject. Lieutenant Philip Mountbatten married Princess Elizabeth, daughter of King George VI of the United Kingdom, on 20 November 1947. In 1952, on the accession of his wife as Queen Elizabeth II, there was some dispute regarding the dynasty to which descendants of Elizabeth and Phillip would belong. Queen Mary (the new Queen's grandmother) expressed to Prime Minister Winston Churchill her aversion to the idea of the House of Mountbatten succeeding the House of Windsor as the royal dynasty, and so it remained Windsor.

- Prince Philip, Duke of Edinburgh (1921–2021) m. Queen Elizabeth II of the United Kingdom
  - King Charles III (b. 1948) m. Lady Diana Spencer, div. 1996, m. Camilla Parker Bowles
    - William, Prince of Wales (b. 1982) m. Catherine Middleton
      - Prince George of Wales (b. 2013)
      - Princess Charlotte of Wales (b. 2015)
      - Prince Louis of Wales (b. 2018)
    - Prince Harry, Duke of Sussex (b. 1984) m. Meghan Markle
      - Prince Archie of Sussex (b. 2019)
      - Princess Lilibet of Sussex (b. 2021)
  - Anne, Princess Royal (b. 1950) m. Captain Mark Phillips, div. 1992, m. Vice Admiral Sir Timothy Laurence
    - Peter Phillips (b. 1977) m. Autumn Kelly, div. 2021
      - Savannah Phillips (b. 2010)
      - Isla Phillips (b. 2012)
    - Zara Phillips (b. 1981) m. Mike Tindall
      - Mia Tindall (b. 2014)
      - Lena Tindall (b. 2018)
      - Lucas Tindall (b. 2021)
  - Andrew Mountbatten-Windsor (b. 1960) m. Sarah Ferguson, div. 1996
    - Princess Beatrice of York (b. 1988) m. Edoardo Mapelli Mozzi
      - Sienna Mapelli Mozzi (b. 2021)
      - Athena Mapelli Mozzi (b. 2025)
    - Princess Eugenie of York (b. 1990) m. Jack Brooksbank
      - August Brooksbank (b. 2021)
      - Ernest Brooksbank (b. 2023)
      - Adelaide Brooksbank (b. 2026)
  - Prince Edward, Duke of Edinburgh (b. 1964) m. Sophie Rhys-Jones
    - Lady Louise Windsor (b. 2003)
    - James, Earl of Wessex (b. 2007)

==== Mountbatten-Windsor ====
Mountbatten-Windsor is the personal surname of some of the descendants of Queen Elizabeth II and Prince Philip, Duke of Edinburgh under an Order in Council issued in 1960, which has not been applied consistently. While the order specifically applies the surname "Mountbatten-Windsor" to Elizabeth's male-line descendants not holding royal styles and titles, "Mountbatten-Windsor" has been formally used by some of her descendants who do hold royal styles. The surname was first officially used by Princess Anne in 1973, in the wedding register for her marriage to Mark Phillips. Prince William and his wife Catherine used the names "Monsieur et Madame Mountbatten-Windsor" when filing a French lawsuit against the French magazine Closer. Prince Harry, Duke of Sussex, and his wife Meghan named their children Archie Mountbatten-Windsor and Lilibet Mountbatten-Windsor from birth, although the children formally became a prince and princess on the accession of their grandfather to the throne on 8 September 2022.

Mountbatten-Windsor differs from the official name of the British royal family or royal house, which remains Windsor. The adoption of the Mountbatten-Windsor surname applies only to members of the royal family who are descended from Elizabeth, and not, for example, to her cousins, or descendants of her sister, Princess Margaret.

== Legacy ==
The city of Ottawa, Ontario, erected Mountbatten Avenue in memory of the 1st Earl Mountbatten of Burma. A Royal Canadian Sea Cadets corps, RCSCC No. 134 Admiral Mountbatten, was named after him in 1946. A 9 ft 5 in (2.9 m) bronze statue by Franta Belsky of Lord Mountbatten of Burma was erected in 1983 outside the Foreign Office, overlooking Horse Guards Parade. The earl is dressed in the uniform of an Admiral of the Fleet.

The neighbourhood of Mountbatten in the planning area of Marine Parade, Singapore, is named after Lord Louis Mountbatten. Java Street in Kuala Lumpur, Malaysia, was renamed Jalan Mountbatten in 1946. In 1981 it was renamed Jalan Tun Perak.

The Mountbatten Institute (formerly known as the Mountbatten Internship Programme), an organization based in New York and London dedicated to fostering work experience and cultural exchange by placing international graduate students abroad to earn postgraduate and degrees was set up by his eldest daughter, Patricia, 2nd Countess Mountbatten. It was named in honour of the countess's father, the 1st Earl Mountbatten of Burma. Despite the family's well-known connections with the Royal Navy, the Mount Batten Peninsula, overlooking the Royal Naval Base of Devonport, England, is not named after them but after Sir William Batten, a 17th-century Surveyor of the Navy.

== Coats of arms ==
Coat of Arms of Prince Louis, 1st Marquess of Milford Haven

Coat of arms of the 2nd Marquess of Milford Haven, after his appointment as GCVO

Coat of Arms of Louis Mountbatten, Earl Mountbatten of Burma

Coat of arms of Queen Louise of Sweden

Coat of Arms of Princes Alexander, Leopold and Maurice of Battenberg (before 1917)

Coat of arms of Alexander Mountbatten, Marquess of Carisbrooke

Coat of Arms of Lord Leopold Mountbatten

Coat of Arms of Prince Philip, Duke of Edinburgh

Coat of Arms Norton Knatchbull, Earl Mountbatten of Burma

Arms of Prince Louis, 1st Marquess of Milford Haven and Prince Henry of Battenberg

Arms of George Mountbatten, 2nd Marquess of Milford Haven and Louis Mountbatten, Earl Mountbatten of Burma

Arms of Queen Louise of Sweden as Crown Princess

Arms of Queen Louise of Sweden

Arms of Princes Alexander, Leopold and Maurice of Battenberg (before 1917)

Arms of Alexander Mountbatten, Marquess of Carisbrooke
(after 1917)

Arms of Prince Philip, Duke of Edinburgh

Arms granted to the Brabourne descendants of Earl Mountbatten of Burma's elder daughter

== Family tree ==
Genealogical Table of the Battenberg, Mountbatten and Mountbatten Windsor Family

Battenberg/ Mountbatten	House of Hesse-Darmstadt	British Royal Family	House of Romanov (Russia)	Greek Royal Family	Swedish Royal Family	Spanish Royal Family
Louis II (1777–1848); Grand Duke of Hesse and by the Rhine; 1830—1848
Victoria	Prince Albert of Saxe-Coburg and Gotha	Prince Charles of Hesse and by the Rhine (1809–1877)	Louis III (1806–1877); Grand Duke of Hesse and by the Rhine; 1848—1877	Prince Alexander of Hesse and by the Rhine (1823–1888)	Julia v. Hauke (Note: This coat of arms is reported in the "Heraldry of the Royal Families of Europe", by Jiri Louda and Michael Maclagan, Clarkson N. Potter, Inc. Publishers, New York, 1981, p216, table 109. While these arms are virtually the same as the city of Mainz, it is a common heraldic law that identical arms are allowed when the bearers are of different nations, but within a nation they are not (see for England, Warbelton v Gorges and Scrope v Grosvenor). However, Wikipedia reports a different set of arms for the family at the article on Hauke-Bosak (However, these arms are for the family in Russia, and the reference given is an expired page in the Polish Wikipedia. There is no reference for the family seen in the Rietstap Armorial General.) (1825–1895); Countess, later Princess of Battenberg	Marie (1824–1880); Empress Maria Alexandrovna	Alexander II (1818–1881); Emperor of All Russia; 1855—1881
Edward VII	Alice (1843–1878); Grand Duchess of Hesse and by the Rhine	Louis IV (1837–1892); Grand Duke of Hesse and by the Rhine; 1877—1892	Princess Beatrice of the United Kingdom (1857–1944)	Prince Henry of Battenberg (1858–1896)	Prince Alexander of Battenberg (1857–1893); Prince of Bulgaria (1879–1886)	Prince Francis Joseph of Battenberg (1861–1924)	Alexander III (1845–1894); Emperor of All Russia; 1881—1894	George I (1845–1913); King of Greece; 1863—1913
George V	Ernest Louis (1868–1937); Grand Duke of Hesse and by the Rhine; 1892—1918	Alix (1872–1918); Empress of Russia	Nicholas II (1868–1918); Emperor of All Russia; 1894—1917	Victoria (1863–1950)	Prince Louis of Battenberg (Note: Admiral of the Fleet, RN GCB, GCVO, KCMG, PC First Sea Lord, RN (1912–1914)) (1854–1921) from 1917 Louis Mountbatten, 1st Marquess of Milford Haven	Alexander (1886–1960) from 1917 Alexander Mountbatten, Marquess of Carisbrooke	Leopold (1889–1922) from 1917 Lord Leopold Mountbatten	Prince Maurice of Battenberg (1891–1914)	Victoria Eugenie of Battenberg (1887–1969) Queen of Spain,1906 –1931	Alfonso XIII (1886–1941); King of Spain; 1886—1931	Constantine I (1868–1923); King of Greece; 1913-17 & 1920-22
George VI	Georg Donatus, Hereditary Grand Duke of Hesse (1906–1937)	Louis, Prince of Hesse and by Rhine (1908–1968)	Princess Alice of Battenberg (1885–1969)	Prince Andrew of Greece and Denmark (1882–1944)	Louise Mountbatten (1889–1965); Queen of Sweden	Gustaf VI Adolf (1882–1973); King of Sweden; 1950—1973	George (1892–1938) 2nd Marquess of Milford Haven	Lord Louis Mountbatten (Note: Admiral of the Fleet, RN KG GCB OM GCSI GCIE GCVO DSO PC FRS Chief of Combined Operations, Chiefs of Staff Committee (UK) and Combined Chiefs of Staff (US & UK) (1941–1943) Supreme Allied Commander, South East Asia Command(1943–1946) Viceroy and Governor-General of India(1947) Governor-General of India(1947–1948) Commander-in-Chief, Mediterranean Fleet, RN (1952–1954) Fourth Sea Lord, RN (1950–1952) First Sea Lord, RN (1955–1959) Chief of the Defence Staff (1959–1965)) (1900–1979) 1st Earl Mountbatten of Burma	Infante Juan; Count of Barcelona (1913–1993)	Paul (1901–1964); King of Greece; 1947—1964
Elizabeth II (1926–2022)	Philip (Note: Prince Philip was born a member of the Danish and Greek Royal House of Glucksborg and was known as Prince Philip of Greece and Denmark. On his marriage he became a naturalized British subject, disclaimed his Greek and Danish titles, and adopted his mother's maiden name of Mountbatten as his surname. As documented in the Mountbatten family and Mountbatten-Windsor articles, the dynastic name of the British Royal Family remains Windsor. However, the personal surname of Queen Elizabeth II and Prince Philip's male-line descendants who do not carry royal titles is Mountbatten-Windsor (e.g. James Mountbatten-Windsor, Earl of Wessex and Lady Louise Mountbatten-Windsor). Philip was created Duke of Edinburgh on his marriage. In 1957, Queen Elizabeth created him a British Prince.) (1921–2021); Duke of Edinburgh	Prince; Gustaf Adolf; Duke of Västerbotten (1906—1947)	David Mountbatten (1919–1970); 3rd Marquess of Milford Haven	Lady Pamela Hicks (1929–2026)	Patricia Knatchbull (1924–2017); 2nd Countess Mountbatten of Burma m. John Knatchbull, 7th Baron Brabourne	Juan Carlos I (1938—); King of Spain; 1975—2014	Sophia (1938—); Queen of Spain; 1975—2014	Constantine II (1940—2023); King of Greece; 1964–73
Charles III (1948–)	Anne, Princess Royal (1950–)	Andrew Mountbatten-Windsor (1960–)	Prince Edward, Duke of Edinburgh (1964–)	Carl XVI Gustaf (1946–); King of Sweden; 1973—	George Mountbatten (1961–); 4th Marquess of Milford Haven	Lord Ivar Mountbatten (1963–)	Norton Knatchbull (1947–); 3rd Earl Mountbatten of Burma	7 others	Felipe VI (1968–); King of Spain; 2014—	Pavlos; Crown Prince (1967—)

== See also ==
- Battenberg family
- Mountbatten-Windsor
- Mountbatten class hovercraft
- Mountbatten Medal
- The Mountbatten School And Language College
- Mountbatten Institute
- Edward Iwi
