= Henry Mountbatten =

Henry Mountbatten may refer to:

- Prince Harry, Duke of Sussex (born 1984; formally Prince Henry), younger son of King Charles III.
- Henry Mountbatten, Earl of Medina (born 1991), only son and heir of George Mountbatten, 4th Marquess of Milford Haven.
