= Mountbatten-Windsor =

Family name

Mountbatten-Windsor Surname
- Royal Member Coat of Arms of Mountbatten-Windsor Member Coat of Arms of Mountbatten-Windsor

- Flag of Mountbatten-Windsor
- Parent family: Glücksburg branch of Oldenburg Prince Andrew of Greece and Denmark (agnatic); Mountbatten branch of Battenberg; Princess Alice of Battenberg (enatic); Windsor branch of Saxe-Coburg and Gotha George VI (enatic) Bowes-Lyon branch of Lyon Queen Elizabeth the Queen Mother (enatic)
- Country: United Kingdom List: Antigua and Barbuda (1981–present); Australia (1960–present); Bahamas (1973–present); Barbados (1966–2021); Belize (1981–present); Canada (1960–present); Ceylon (1960–1972); Fiji (1970–1987); The Gambia (1965–1970); Ghana (1960); Grenada (1974–present); Guyana (1966–1970); Jamaica (1962–present); Kenya (1963–1964); Malawi (1964–1966); Malta (1964–1974); Mauritius (1968–1992); New Zealand (1960–present); Nigeria (1960–1963); Papua New Guinea (1975–present); Saint Kitts and Nevis (1983–present); Saint Lucia (1979–present); Saint Vincent and the Grenadines (1979–present); Sierra Leone (1961–1971); Solomon Islands (1978–present); South Africa (1960–1961); Tanganyika (1961–1962); Trinidad and Tobago (1962–1976); Tuvalu (1978–present); Uganda (1962–1963)
- Founded: 1960; 66 years ago
- Founder: Elizabeth II and Prince Philip, Duke of Edinburgh
- Current head: Charles III
- Members: 14
- Connected families: British royal family Norwegian royal family Danish royal family Greek royal family Spencer; Middleton; Markle; Brooksbank; Mapelli Mozzi; Ferguson

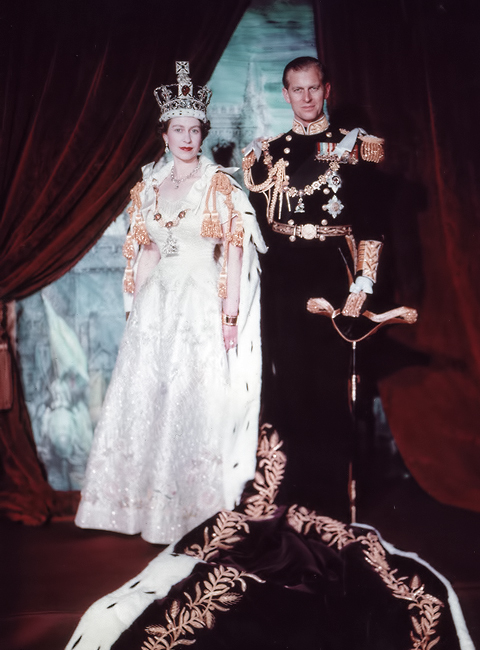
Coronation portrait of Elizabeth II and Philip, June 1953

Mountbatten-Windsor is the family surname available to and used by descendants of Queen Elizabeth II and Prince Philip, Duke of Edinburgh, when a surname is required. Generally, those who are entitled to, and use, the royal style HRH Prince or Princess have no need for a surname. A surname may become needed, for example to register a marriage, and for non-royal children. Mountbatten-Windsor combines Elizabeth's house name of Windsor and Prince Philip's adopted surname of Mountbatten, the name his maternal family the House of Battenberg adopted in 1917. Its use was authorised in a declaration by the Privy Council in 1960. The male line ancestry of the Mountbatten-Windsors is through the House of Glücksburg, the senior surviving branch of the German House of Oldenburg, one of Europe's oldest royal houses.

== Origin ==
Mountbatten-Windsor was created by combining the royal family's House name of Windsor and Prince Philip's adopted surname, Mountbatten, an Anglicised version of Battenberg. In 1960 the Queen declared:

Whereas on the 9th day of April 1952, I did declare in Council My Will and Pleasure that I and My children shall be styled and known as the House and Family of Windsor, and that My descendants, other than female descendants who marry and their descendants, shall bear the name of Windsor:

And whereas I have given further consideration to the position of those of My descendants who will enjoy neither the style, title or attribute of Royal Highness, nor the titular dignity of Prince and for whom therefore a surname will be necessary: And whereas I have concluded that the Declaration made by Me on the 9th day of April 1952, should be varied in its application to such persons:

Now therefore I declare My Will and Pleasure that, while I and My Children shall continue to be styled and known as the House and Family of Windsor, My descendants other than descendants enjoying the style, title or attribute of Royal Highness and the titular dignity of Prince or Princess and female descendants who marry and their descendants shall bear the name of Mountbatten-Windsor.

The Privy Council declaration made it so that Elizabeth's descendants who bear princely titles keep the house name Windsor but do not need a surname, pursuant to a declaration she made in a previous Privy Council meeting at the beginning of her reign, but those who do not, use the surname Mountbatten-Windsor. This is the case for James Mountbatten-Windsor, Earl of Wessex. Any female descendants who marry, and their descendants, do not hold the surname Mountbatten-Windsor; this is the case for Zara Tindall, who was born with the surname Phillips as a daughter of Anne, Princess Royal, and Mark Phillips.

== Current use ==
The British monarchy asserted that the name Mountbatten-Windsor should be used by members of the royal family when a surname is required. For example, Anne, Princess Royal and her brother (then HRH Prince) Andrew, children of Queen Elizabeth II, used the surname Mountbatten-Windsor in official marriage registry entries in 1973 and 1986, respectively. Likewise, William, Prince of Wales, used the name when filing a French lawsuit related to the topless pictures of his wife Catherine, Princess of Wales published by the French magazine Closer. At the time of the 1960 declaration, palace officials claimed in private communications that it created a 'hidden' surname that would emerge several generations later when some of Queen Elizabeth II's descendants became further removed from the throne. On the wedding of Prince Edward and Sophie Rhys-Jones in 1999, the Queen decided, with their agreement, that any of their future children should not be styled His or Her Royal Highness. Consequently, the birth of their daughter in 2003 marked the first emergence of the Mountbatten-Windsor surname (hyphenated). Their daughter was named Louise Alice Elizabeth Mary Mountbatten-Windsor, and she goes by the title of Lady Louise Mountbatten-Windsor.

Mountbatten-Windsor as a surname differs from the official name of the British royal family, which remains the House of Windsor. In accordance with law and custom in the English-speaking world, the surname Mountbatten-Windsor belongs to all male-line descendants of Queen Elizabeth II and Prince Philip, and can be used by them if and when a surname is needed. In contrast, male-line descendants of King George V, the first monarch of the House of Windsor, use Windsor as their surname in cases where a surname is needed if they are not direct descendants of Queen Elizabeth II and Prince Philip, as for example Lady Davina Windsor is a descendant of George V's son Prince Henry, Duke of Gloucester. (George V's other sons have no male-line descendants: King George VI had only daughters while King Edward VIII had no issue and Prince John died young and was unmarried.) After the House of Saxe-Coburg and Gotha was renamed Windsor, other descendants of Queen Victoria and Prince Albert of Saxe-Coburg and Gotha could also use the name Windsor, as for example, Alastair Arthur Windsor, 2nd Duke of Connaught and Strathearn, grandson of their son Prince Arthur, Duke of Connaught and Strathearn. None do so today, however, because the only extant male line (apart from the descendants of King George V) is through Charles Edward, Duke of Saxe-Coburg and Gotha, whose descendants use the surname Saxe-Coburg and Gotha (English) or von Sachsen-Coburg und Gotha (German).

The former Prince Andrew became Andrew Mountbatten-Windsor after Charles III's October 2025 decision to initiate the processes of stripping him of all royal styles and titles and agreement that he would move out of Royal Lodge. While the initial announcements spelt the surname "Mountbatten Windsor", on 12 November it was reported it would be hyphenated as "Mountbatten-Windsor" in conformity with the 1960 declaration.

== See also ==
- Succession to the British throne
- House of Windsor, Queen Elizabeth II's paternal family
- Bowes-Lyon family, Queen Elizabeth II's maternal family
- House of Glücksburg, Prince Philip's paternal family
- Mountbatten family, Prince Philip's maternal family
- Descendants of Elizabeth II
