= Lady Tatiana Mountbatten =

English equestrian (born 1990)

Lady Tatiana Dru
- Born: Tatiana Helen Georgia Mountbatten; 16 April 1990 (age 36); London, England
- Occupations: Equestrian, Psychotherapist
- Spouse: Alexander Bernard Molyneux Dru (m. 2022)
- Children: 2
- Parents: George Mountbatten, 4th Marquess of Milford Haven (father); Sarah Georgina Walker (mother)
- Family: Mountbatten
- Website: tatianatherapy.com

Lady Tatiana Helen Georgia Dru (née Mountbatten; born 16 April 1990) is an English equestrian.

== Early life and family ==
Lady Tatiana Mountbatten was born on 16 April 1990 to George Mountbatten, 4th Marquess of Milford Haven and his first wife, Sarah Georgina (née Walker). She is an older sister of Henry Mountbatten, Earl of Medina. Her paternal great-grandparents, Prince George of Battenberg and Countess Nadejda Mikhailovna de Torby, were morganatic descendants of German and Russian royal houses.

Her great-grandparents gave up their German titles in exchange for titles within the British peerage and Anglicised their family name from Battenberg to Mountbatten. Through her father, Lady Tatiana is a descendant of Alexander Pushkin, Abram Gannibal and multiple monarchs including Louis II, Grand Duke of Hesse, Louis IV, Grand Duke of Hesse, Nicholas I of Russia, and Queen Victoria. She is a paternal second cousin once removed of Charles III and the first cousin twice removed of Prince Philip, Duke of Edinburgh.

Lady Tatiana went to school at Millfield in Street, Somerset. She is an equestrian and competes at a high level in dressage. She trained under Hasse Hoffamann, Klaus Balkenhol, and Kyra Kyrklund, before training under Charlotte Dujardin.

In 2007, she was presented to society at Le Bal des Débutantes in Paris. In October 2018, Crofton & Hall appointed her as their brand ambassador.

== Equestrian ==
In November 2019, Lady Tatiana published a personal website containing an equestrian and country style blog. She has previously raced in The 2021 Magnolia Cup for a UK Charity.

== Personal life ==
In December 2019, she was banned from driving for six months by a Magistrates Court because of speeding-related offences.

Her engagement to entrepreneur Alexander 'Alick' Bernard Molyneux Dru (born 1991), from Bickham, Somerset, was announced in January 2022; the proposal took place during a vacation in Verbier, in the Swiss Alps. Alick Dru is the son of Bernard Auberon Alexander Dru and his wife Catherine Margaret Norden, great-grandson of Colonel Aubrey Herbert, great-great-grandson of the 4th Earl of Carnarvon and of the 4th Viscount de Vesci, and great-grandnephew (by marriage) of Evelyn Waugh. The couple married at Winchester Cathedral on 23 July 2022. They have two children.

Her website and Instagram account state that she is a psychotherapist in training; she wishes to combine her knowledge of horses and somehow incorporate them into her methods of therapy.

| Preceded by Henry Mountbatten, Earl of Medina | Line of succession to the British throne descendant of Princess Alice of the United Kingdom, daughter of Queen Victoria | Succeeded by Elodie Dru |
