= Princess Victoria of Hesse and by Rhine =

Marchioness of Milford Haven (1863–1950)

Princess Victoria
- Marchioness of Milford Haven
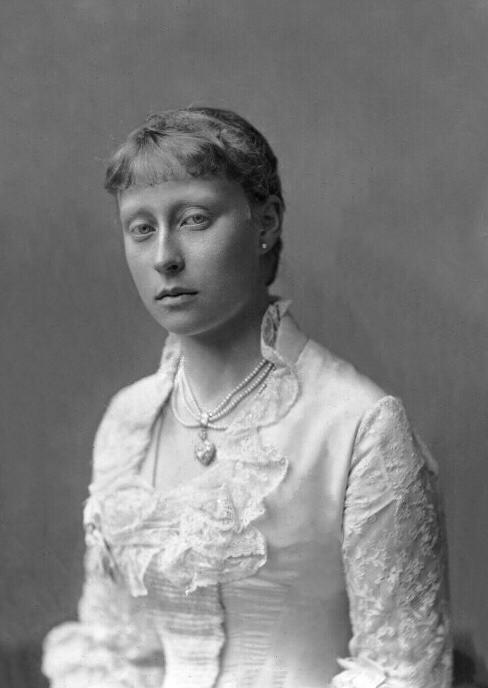
- Portrait c. 1878
- Born: 5 April 1863; Windsor Castle, Berkshire, England
- Died: 24 September 1950 (aged 87); Kensington Palace, London, England
- Burial: 28 September 1950; St Mildred's Church, Whippingham, Isle of Wight
- Spouse: Prince Louis of Battenberg (m. 1884; died 1921)
- Issue: Alice, Princess Andrew of Greece and Denmark; Louise, Queen of Sweden; George Mountbatten, 2nd Marquess of Milford Haven; Louis Mountbatten, 1st Earl Mountbatten of Burma
Names
- Victoria Alberta Elisabeth Mathilde Marie
- House: Hesse-Darmstadt
- Father: Louis IV, Grand Duke of Hesse and by Rhine
- Mother: Princess Alice of the United Kingdom

Princess Victoria of Hesse and by Rhine (5 April 1863 – 24 September 1950), later Princess Louis of Battenberg and then Victoria Mountbatten, Marchioness of Milford Haven, was the eldest daughter of Louis IV, Grand Duke of Hesse and by Rhine, and Princess Alice of the United Kingdom.

Victoria was born at Windsor Castle in the presence of her namesake grandmother, Queen Victoria. She was raised in Germany and England. Her mother died while Victoria and her siblings were still young, placing her in an early position of responsibility within the family. Despite her father's disapproval, she married his morganatic first cousin, Prince Louis of Battenberg, an officer in the British Royal Navy. Victoria lived in various parts of Europe during her husband's naval career and through visits to her many royal relations. She was regarded by her family as liberal in outlook, straightforward, practical, and intelligent. The couple had four children: Alice, Louise, George, and Louis.

During World War I, Victoria and her husband abandoned their German titles and adopted the surname Mountbatten, an anglicised version of the German "Battenberg". Two of her sisters – Elisabeth and Alix, who had married into the Russian imperial family – were murdered during the Russian revolution. After World War II, her daughter Louise became queen consort of Sweden and her son Louis was appointed the last Viceroy of India. She was the maternal grandmother of Prince Philip, Duke of Edinburgh, consort of Queen Elizabeth II, and the paternal great-grandmother of King Charles III.

== Early life ==
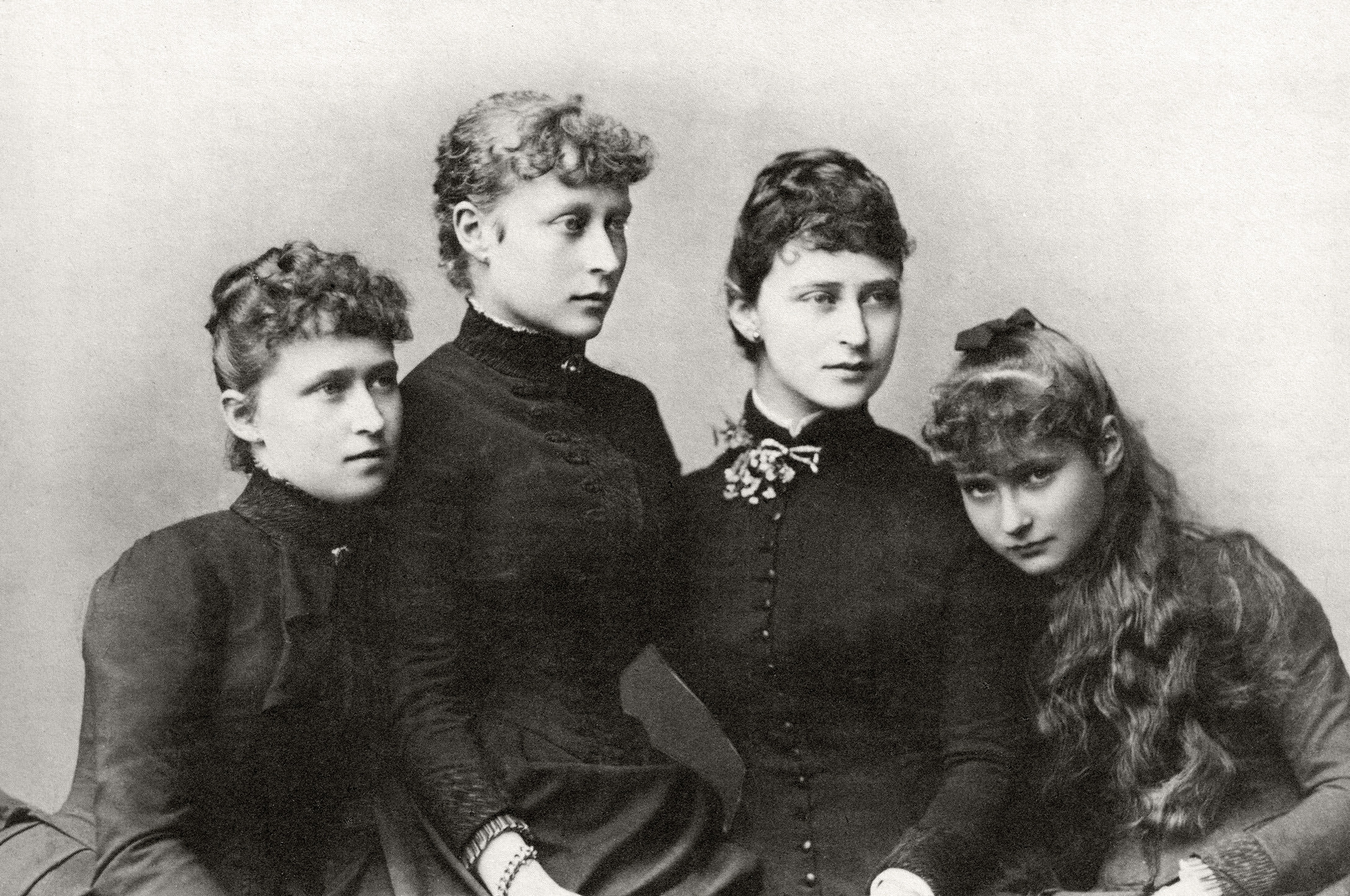
Four of the Hesse sisters: (left to right) Irene, Victoria, Elisabeth, and Alix, 1885

Victoria was born on Easter Sunday in 1863 at Windsor Castle, in the presence of her maternal grandmother, Queen Victoria. The eldest daughter of Princess Alice and Louis IV, Grand Duke of Hesse, she was baptised into the Lutheran faith in the Green Drawing Room at Windsor Castle on 27 April, and was held in the Queen's arms during the ceremony. Her godparents were Queen Victoria; Princess Mary Adelaide of Cambridge; Louis III, Grand Duke of Hesse and by Rhine (represented by Prince Alexander of Hesse and by Rhine); the Prince of Wales; and Prince Heinrich of Hesse and by Rhine.

Victoria spent her early childhood in Bessungen, a suburb of Darmstadt, before the family moved to the New Palace in Darmstadt when she was three. She shared a room with her younger sister, Elisabeth, until they reached adulthood. Privately educated to a high standard, she remained an avid reader throughout her life.

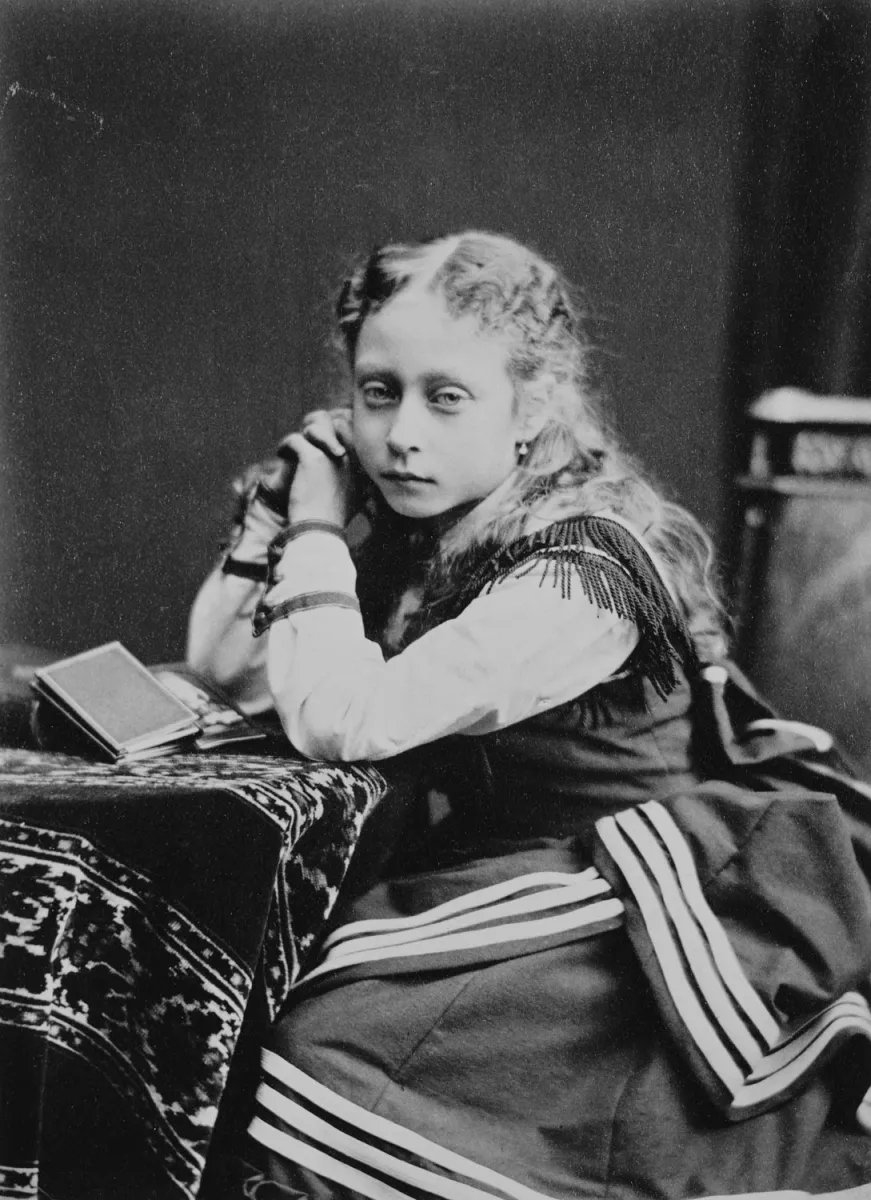
Victoria in 1871

During the Prussian invasion of Hesse in June 1866, Victoria and Elisabeth were sent to Britain to live with their grandmother until hostilities ended with the absorption of Hesse-Kassel and parts of Hesse-Darmstadt into Prussia. During the Franco-Prussian War of 1870, military hospitals were established in the palace grounds at Darmstadt, and Victoria assisted her mother in the soup kitchens. She later recalled the severe winter cold and an incident in which her arm was burned by hot soup.

In 1872, Victoria's eighteen-month-old brother, Friedrich, was diagnosed with haemophilia. The news shocked Europe's royal families; it had been two decades since Queen Victoria had given birth to her haemophiliac son, Prince Leopold, Duke of Albany, and Friedrich's diagnosis was the first clear indication that the disorder was hereditary within the royal family. The following year, Friedrich fell from a window onto stone steps and died, marking the first of several tragedies to affect the Hesse family.

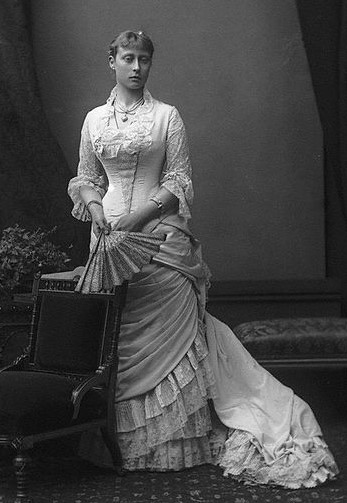
Photograph by Alexander Bassano, c. 1878

In early November 1878, Victoria contracted diphtheria. Elisabeth was quickly moved from their shared room and was the only member of the family to avoid infection. For several days, Victoria's mother nursed the sick, but she was unable to save her youngest daughter, Marie, who died in mid-November. Just as the remaining family members appeared to be recovering, Alice fell ill. She died on 14 December, the anniversary of the death of her father, Prince Albert. As the eldest child, Victoria assumed some of her mother's responsibilities, caring for her younger siblings and supporting her father. She later wrote, "My mother's death was an irreparable loss ... My childhood ended with her death, for I became the eldest and most responsible".

== Marriage and family ==
At family gatherings, Victoria had often met Prince Louis of Battenberg, her first cousin once removed and a member of a morganatic branch of the Hessian royal family. Louis had adopted British nationality and was serving as an officer in the Royal Navy. They met again in Darmstadt in the winter of 1882 and became engaged the following summer.

After a brief postponement because of the death of her maternal uncle, Prince Leopold, Duke of Albany, Victoria married Louis on 30 April 1884 in Darmstadt. Her father disapproved of the match; in his view, Louis – his own first cousin – had little money and would take Victoria abroad to live in Britain, depriving him of her company. Victoria, however, was independent‑minded and paid little heed to her father's objections. Remarkably, that same evening, her father secretly married his mistress, Countess Alexandrine von Hutten-Czapska, the former wife of Alexander von Kolemine, the Russian chargé d'affaires in Darmstadt. His marriage to a divorcee of unequal rank shocked Europe's royal houses, and diplomatic and family pressure forced him to seek an annulment.

Over the next sixteen years, Victoria and Louis had four children:

Name	Birth	Death	Marriage
Alice	25 February 1885	5 December 1969	Married 1903 Prince Andrew of Greece and Denmark; Five children, including Prince Philip, Duke of Edinburgh
Louise	13 July 1889	7 March 1965	Married 1923 King Gustaf VI Adolf of Sweden (his second marriage); One stillborn daughter
George	6 November 1892	8 April 1938	Married 1916 Countess Nadejda Mikhailovna de Torby (daughter of Grand Duke Michael Mikhailovich of Russia); Two children
Louis	25 June 1900	27 August 1979	Married 1922 Hon. Edwina Ashley; Two children

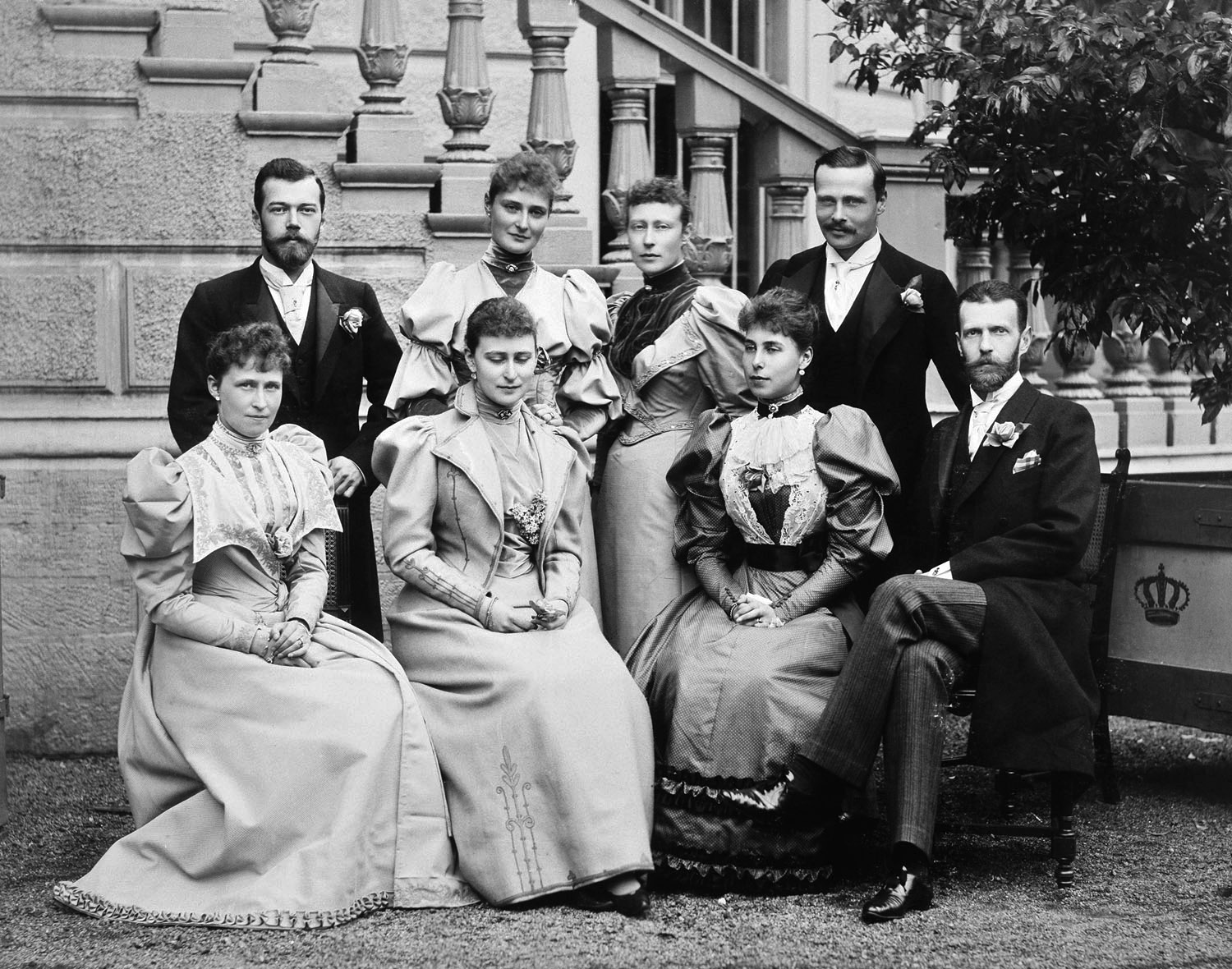
Victoria (back row, second from right) at the marriage of her brother Ernest Louis (back row, right) to Princess Victoria Melita of Saxe-Coburg and Gotha (seated, second from right), 1894. Nicholas II of Russia and his fiancé Alix are on the back row left, Irene and Elisabeth are seated front row left, and Grand Duke Sergei Alexandrovich of Russia (Elisabeth's husband) is seated right.

The couple lived in a succession of houses in Chichester and Walton-on-Thames in England, and at Schloss Heiligenberg in Germany. When Louis was serving with the Mediterranean Fleet, Victoria spent several winters in Malta. In 1887, she contracted typhoid but, after being nursed through her illness by her husband, had recovered sufficiently by June to attend Queen Victoria's Golden Jubilee celebrations in London. She had an interest in science, drew a detailed geological map of Malta, and took part in archaeological excavations both on the island and in Germany. She kept meticulous leather‑bound volumes recording the books she read, which show a wide range of subjects, including socialist philosophy.

The family were present at Windsor for Queen Victoria's funeral service at St George's Chapel. Under the terms of the late Queen's will, Victoria received an increase of £2,000 in her annual income.

She personally educated her children and introduced them to new ideas and inventions. She taught her younger son, Louis, until he was ten years old. He later said of her, in 1968, that she was "a walking encyclopedia. All through her life she stored up knowledge on all sorts of subjects, and she had the great gift of being able to make it all interesting when she taught it to me. She was completely methodical; we had time-tables for each subject, and I had to do preparation, and so forth. She taught me to enjoy working hard, and to be thorough. She was outspoken and open-minded to a degree quite unusual in members of the Royal Family. And she was also entirely free from prejudice about politics or colour and things of that kind."

In 1906, she flew in a Zeppelin airship and later flew in a biplane even though it was "not made to carry passengers, and we perched securely attached on a little stool holding on to the flyer's back". Until 1914, Victoria regularly visited relatives abroad in both Germany and Russia, including her two sisters who had married into the Russian imperial family: Elisabeth, who had married Grand Duke Sergei Alexandrovich, and Alix, who had married Emperor Nicholas II. Victoria was among the Empress's relatives who attempted to dissuade her from the influence of Rasputin. At the outbreak of war between Germany and Britain in 1914, Victoria and her daughter, Louise, were in Russia in Yekaterinburg. Travelling by train and steamer, they reached St Petersburg and continued through Tornio to Stockholm, before sailing from Bergen, Norway, on "the last ship" back to Britain.

== Later life and death ==
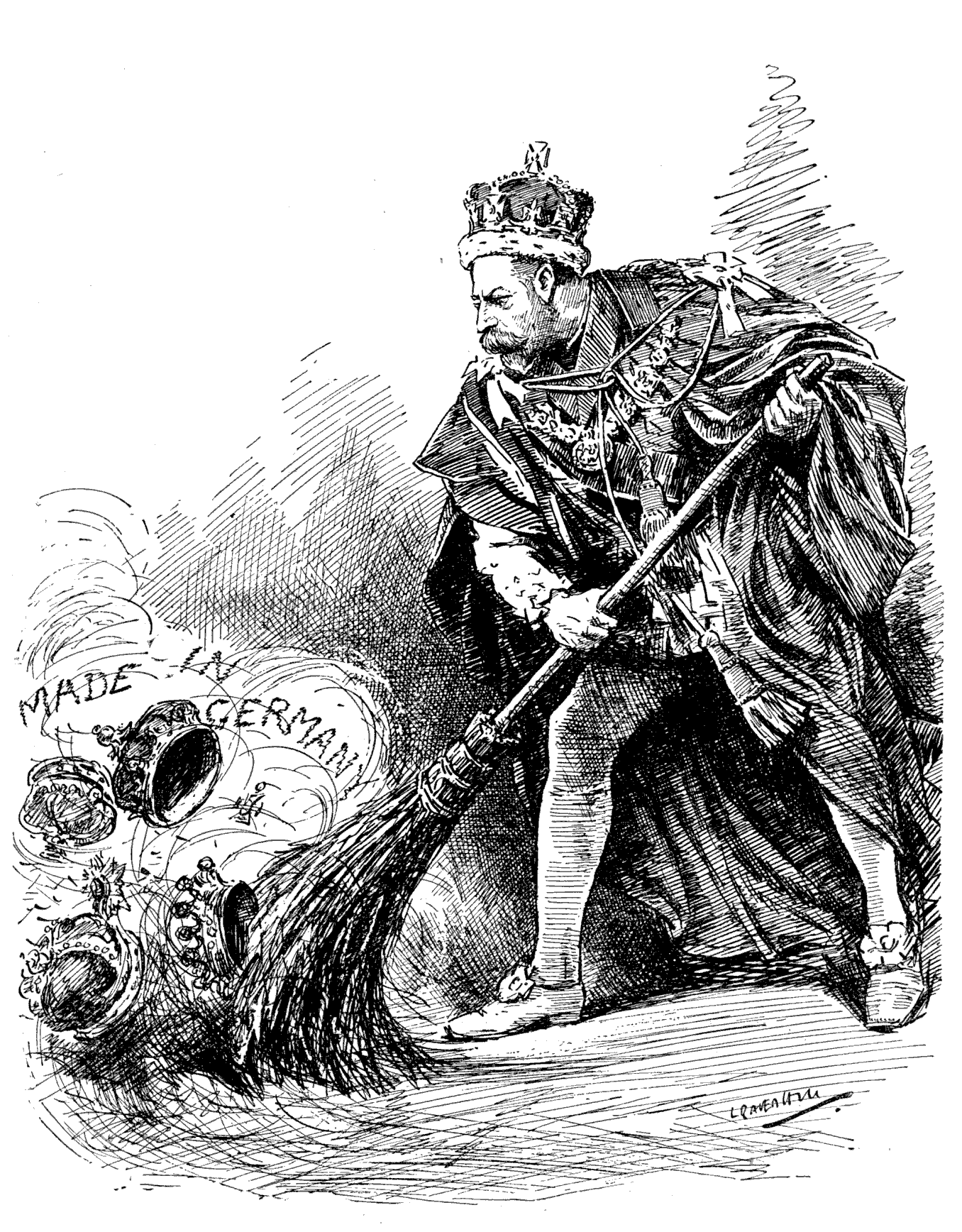
A 1917 Punch cartoon depicting King George V sweeping away the German titles held by members of his family

Louis was forced to resign from the navy at the start of the war when his German origins became an embarrassment, and the couple retired for the war years to Kent House on the Isle of Wight, which Victoria had been given by her aunt Princess Louise, Duchess of Argyll. Victoria blamed her husband's forced resignation on the Government "who few greatly respect or trust". She distrusted the First Lord of the Admiralty, Winston Churchill, because she thought him unreliable – he had once borrowed a book and failed to return it. Continued public hostility to Germany in the United Kingdom led King George V to renounce his German titles, and on 14 July 1917 Louis and Victoria renounced theirs, assuming an anglicised version of Battenberg – Mountbatten – as their surname. Four months later Louis was re-ennobled by the King as Marquess of Milford Haven. During the war, Victoria's two sisters, Alix and Elisabeth, were murdered in the Russian revolution, and her brother, Ernest Louis, Grand Duke of Hesse, was deposed. On her last visit to Russia in 1914, Victoria had driven past Ipatiev House in Yekaterinburg where Alix would be murdered. In January 1921, after a long and complex journey, Elisabeth's body was interred in Jerusalem in Victoria's presence. Alix's body was not recovered during Victoria's lifetime.

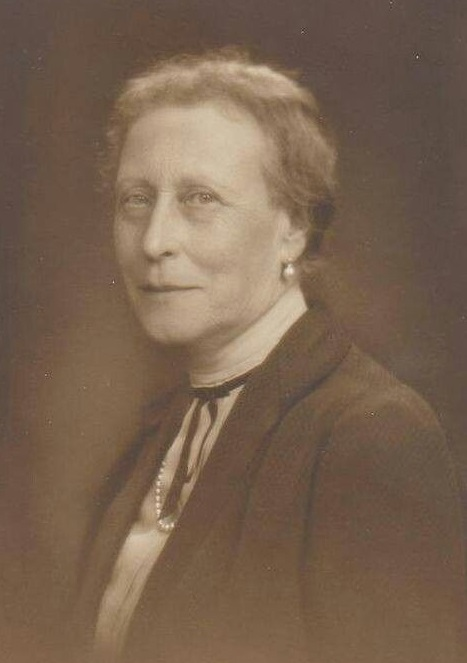
Victoria in 1932

Victoria's husband died in London in September 1921. After meeting her at the Naval and Military Club in Piccadilly, he complained of feeling unwell, and Victoria persuaded him to rest in a room they had booked in the club annexe. She called a doctor, who prescribed some medicine, and Victoria went out to fill the prescription at a nearby pharmacy. When she returned, Louis was dead. Upon her widowhood, Victoria moved into a grace-and-favour residence at Apartment 7, Kensington Palace, and, in the words of her biographer "became a central matriarchal figure in the lives of Europe's surviving royalty". In 1930, her eldest daughter, Alice, suffered a nervous breakdown and was diagnosed as schizophrenic. In the following decade Victoria was largely responsible for her grandson Prince Philip's education and upbringing during his parents' separation and his mother's institutionalisation. Philip recalled, "I liked my grandmother very much and she was always helpful. She was very good with children ... she took the practical approach to them. She treated them in the right way – the right combination of the rational and the emotional."

In 1937, Victoria's brother, Ernest Louis, died, and soon afterwards her widowed sister-in-law, nephew, granddaughter and two of her great-grandchildren all died in an air crash in Ostend. Victoria's granddaughter, Princess Cecilie of Greece and Denmark, had married Victoria's nephew (Ernest Louis's son), Georg Donatus, Hereditary Grand Duke of Hesse. They and their two young sons, Louis and Alexander, were all killed. Cecilie's youngest child, Johanna, who was not on the plane, was adopted by her uncle Prince Louis of Hesse and by Rhine, whose wedding the crash victims were travelling to, but the child survived her parents and brothers by only eighteen months, dying in 1939 of meningitis.

Further tragedy followed when Victoria's son, George, died of bone cancer the following year. Her granddaughter, Lady Pamela Hicks, remembered her grandmother's tears. During World War II Victoria was bombed out of her Kensington Palace apartment in October 1940, and spent some time at Windsor Castle with King George VI. Her surviving son (Louis) and her two grandsons (David Mountbatten and Prince Philip) served in the Royal Navy, while her German relations fought with the opposing forces. She spent most of her time reading and worrying about her children; her daughter, Alice, remained in occupied Greece and was unable to communicate with her mother for four years at the height of the war. After the Allied victory, her son Louis was made Viscount Mountbatten of Burma. He was offered the post of Viceroy of India, but she was opposed to his accepting, knowing that the position would be dangerous and difficult; he accepted anyway.

On 15 December 1948, Victoria attended the christening of her great-grandson, Prince Charles. She was one of eight sponsors or godparents, along with King George VI, King Haakon VII of Norway, Queen Mary, Princess Margaret, Prince George of Greece and Denmark, Lady Brabourne, and David Bowes-Lyon.

She fell ill with bronchitis (she had smoked since the age of 16) at Lord Mountbatten's home at Broadlands, Hampshire, in the summer of 1950. Saying "it is better to die at home", Victoria moved back to Kensington Palace, where she died on 24 September aged 87. She was buried four days later in the grounds of St. Mildred's Church, Whippingham, on the Isle of Wight.

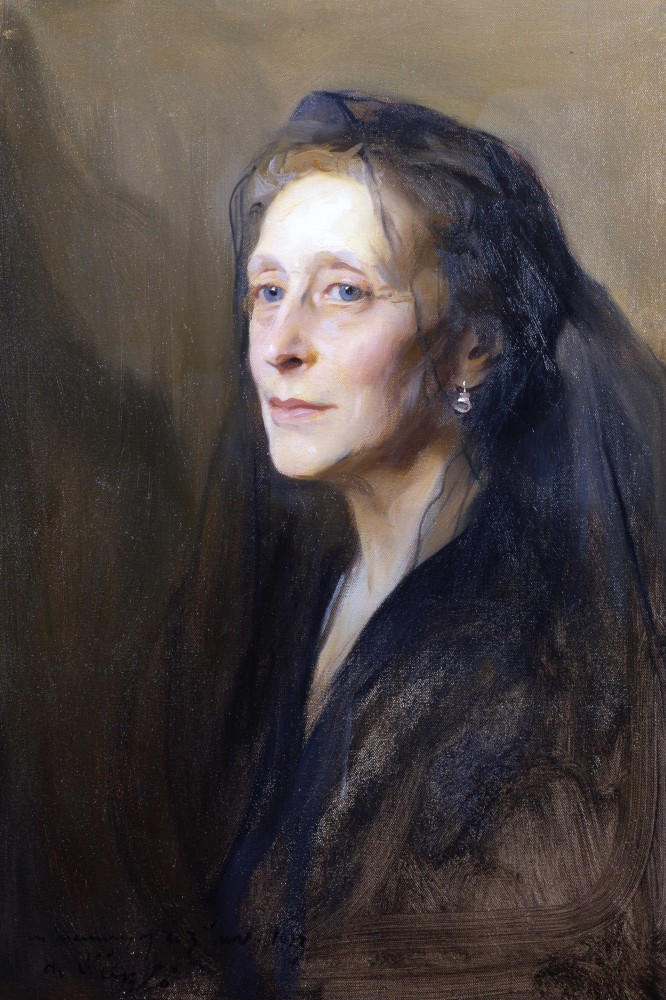
Portrait by Philip de László, 1937

== Legacy ==
With the help of her lady-in-waiting, Baroness Sophie Buxhoeveden, Victoria wrote a memoir, held in the Mountbatten archive at the University of Southampton, which remains a source for royal historians. A selection of Queen Victoria's letters to Victoria has been published with a commentary by Richard Hough and an introduction by Victoria's granddaughter, Patricia Mountbatten.

Lord Mountbatten remembered her fondly: "My mother was very quick on the uptake, very talkative, very aggressive and argumentative. With her marvellous brain she sharpened people's wits." Her granddaughter thought her "formidable, but never intimidating ... a supremely honest woman, full of commonsense and modesty". Victoria wrote her own typically forthright epitaph at the end of her life in letters to, and conversation with, her son: "What will live in history is the good work done by the individual & that has nothing to do with rank or title ... I never thought I would be known only as your mother. You're so well known now and no one knows about me, and I don't want them to."

== Honours ==
- Grand Duchy of Hesse: Dame of the Order of the Golden Lion, 1 January 1883
- Kingdom of Prussia: Red Cross Medal, 1st Class
- Russian Empire: Dame Grand Cross of the Order of St. Catherine
- United Kingdom:
  - Queen Victoria Golden Jubilee Medal, 1887
  - Royal Order of Victoria and Albert, 1st Class

== Ancestry ==
Ancestors of Princess Victoria of Hesse and by Rhine

8. Louis II, Grand Duke of Hesse and by Rhine
4. Prince Charles of Hesse and by Rhine
9. Princess Wilhelmine of Baden
2. Louis IV, Grand Duke of Hesse and by Rhine
10. Prince Wilhelm of Prussia
5. Princess Elisabeth of Prussia
11. Princess Maria Anna of Hesse-Homburg
1. Victoria Mountbatten, Marchioness of Milford Haven
12. Ernest I, Duke of Saxe-Coburg and Gotha
6. Prince Albert of Saxe-Coburg and Gotha
13. Princess Louise of Saxe-Gotha-Altenburg
3. Princess Alice of the United Kingdom
14. Prince Edward, Duke of Kent and Strathearn
7. Victoria of the United Kingdom
15. Princess Victoria of Saxe-Coburg-Saalfeld
