= Marquess of Milford Haven =

Title in the Peerage of the United Kingdom

Marquessate of Milford Haven
- Creation date: 17 July 1917
- Created by: King George V
- Peerage: Peerage of the United Kingdom
- First holder: Prince Louis of Battenberg
- Present holder: George Mountbatten, 4th Marquess
- Heir apparent: Henry Mountbatten, Earl of Medina
- Remainder to: 1st Marquess's heirs male of the body lawfully begotten
- Subsidiary titles: Earl of Medina; Viscount Alderney
- Status: Extant
- Seat: Great Trippetts Estate
- Former seats: Lynden Manor; Moyns Park
- Motto: IN HONOUR BOUND

Marquess of Milford Haven is a title in the Peerage of the United Kingdom.

== History ==
The marquessate of Milford Haven was created in 1917 for Prince Louis of Battenberg, the former First Sea Lord and a relation by marriage to the British royal family. Amidst the anti-German sentiments of the First World War, Prince Louis abandoned the use of his German surname and titles and adopted the surname Mountbatten, an Anglicized version of the surname Battenberg. He was at the same time made Earl of Medina and Viscount Alderney, also in the Peerage of the United Kingdom. The title honours the Welsh seaport and shipyard town of Milford Haven.

As of 2025, the titles are held by his great-grandson, the fourth Marquess, who succeeded his father in 1970.

=== Other family members ===
Louis Mountbatten, 1st Marquess of Milford Haven

- Louis Mountbatten, 1st Earl Mountbatten of Burma (1900–1979), was the second son of the 1st Marquess of Milford Haven.
- Alexander Albert Mountbatten, 1st Marquess of Carisbrooke (1886–1960), was a nephew of the 1st Marquess of Milford Haven.
- Prince Philip, Duke of Edinburgh (1921–2021) was a grandson of the 1st Marquess of Milford Haven, and through him, the younger generations of the British royal family are descendants of the 1st Marquess.

=== Estates ===
The family lived at Lynden Manor at Holyport, Berkshire, now split into four houses. A later seat was Moyns Park in Birdbrook, Essex. The 1st and 3rd Marquess of Milford Haven are buried at St. Mildred's Church, Whippingham; the 2nd Marquess is buried in Bray Cemetery, Bray, Berkshire.

The present Marquess owns the Great Trippetts Estate in Sussex.

== Marquesses of Milford Haven (1917) ==
Other titles (1st Marquess onwards): Earl of Medina (UK, 1917) Viscount Alderney (UK, 1917)

- Louis Alexander Mountbatten, 1st Marquess of Milford Haven (1854–1921)
- George Louis Victor Henry Serge Mountbatten, 2nd Marquess of Milford Haven (1892–1938)
- David Michael Mountbatten, 3rd Marquess of Milford Haven (1919–1970)
- George Ivar Louis Mountbatten, 4th Marquess of Milford Haven (b. 1961)

The heir apparent is the present holder's son, Henry David Louis Mountbatten, who at present uses the courtesy title Earl of Medina (b. 1991).

== Line of succession ==
Ref:

- Louis Alexander Mountbatten, 1st Marquess of Milford Haven (1854–1921)
  - George Mountbatten, 2nd Marquess of Milford Haven (1892–1938)
    - David Mountbatten, 3rd Marquess of Milford Haven (1919–1970)
      - George Mountbatten, 4th Marquess of Milford Haven (born 1961)
        - (1) Henry Mountbatten, Earl of Medina (b. 1991)
      - (2) Lord Ivar Mountbatten (b. 1963)

== Arms ==
Coat of arms of Marquess of Milford Haven
Notes Arms of the 2nd Marquess of Milford Haven Coronet A Coronet of a Marquess Crest 1st: Out of a Coronet Or two Horns barry of ten Argent and Gules issuing from each three Linden Leaves Vert and from the outer side of each horn four Branches barwise having three like Leaves pendent therefrom of the last (Hesse); 2nd: Out of a Coronet Or a Plume of four Ostrich Feathers alternately Argent and Sable (Battenberg) Escutcheon Quarterly: 1st and 4th, Azure a Lion rampant double-queued barry of ten Argent and Gules armed and langued of the last crowned Or within a Bordure compony of the second and third (Hesse); 2nd and 3rd, Argent two Pallets Sable (Battenberg); charged on the honour point with an Escutcheon of the arms of Princess Alice of the United Kingdom, namely the Royal Arms differenced by a Label of three points Argent the centre point charged with a Rose Gules barbed Vert and each of the other points with an Ermine Spot Sable Supporters On either side a Lion double-queued and crowned all Or Motto In Honour Bound
