= Mountbatten Institute =

- Founded: 1984
- Location: New York City
- Region served: London, India
- Patron: Lord Ivor Mountbatten
- Key people: Ambassador Dr. Paul Beresford-Hill, CBE, Dr. Ronald J. Kovach, Christopher Chan
- Website: mountbatten.org

The Mountbatten Institute is an organization based in New York City, dedicated to fostering international exchange and study by placing international graduate students abroad to earn business certificates. Named in honour of Louis Mountbatten, 1st Earl Mountbatten of Burma, and benefacted by his eldest daughter, Patricia, 2nd Countess Mountbatten, the organization was founded in 1984.

== Education Program ==
The Mountbatten Institute offers students in New York City the opportunity to study for a Certificate in Applied Entrepreneurial Management.
