= David Mountbatten, 3rd Marquess of Milford Haven =

British noble (1919–1970)

Lieutenant The Most Honourable The Marquess of Milford Haven OBE DSC
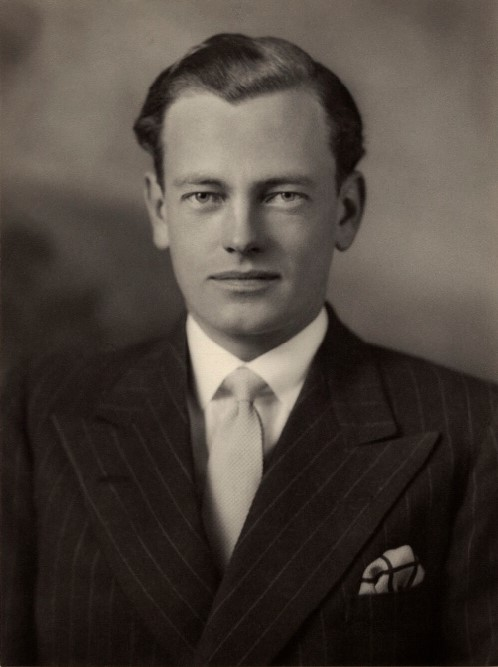
- Portrait, late 1940s
- Born: David Michael Mountbatten; 12 May 1919; Edinburgh, Scotland
- Died: 14 April 1970 (aged 50); London, England
- Spouses: Romaine Dahlgren Pierce (m. 1950; div. 1954) Janet Mercedes Bryce (m. 1960)
- Issue: George Mountbatten, 4th Marquess of Milford Haven; Lord Ivar Mountbatten
- Parents: George Mountbatten, 2nd Marquess of Milford Haven; Countess Nadejda Mikhailovna of Torby
- Military career
- Allegiance: United Kingdom
- Branch: Royal Navy
- Service years: 1933–1948
- Rank: Lieutenant
- Conflicts: World War II; Siege of Malta; Operation Pedestal
- Awards: Distinguished Service Cross; Officer of the Order of the British Empire

Lieutenant David Michael Mountbatten, 3rd Marquess of Milford Haven, (12 May 1919 – 14 April 1970) was a British peer and naval officer. Styled Viscount Alderney before 1921 and Earl of Medina between 1921 and 1938, he succeeded his father as Marquess in 1938 and served in the Royal Navy during the Second World War.

== Early years and education ==
David Michael Mountbatten was born on 12 May 1919 in Edinburgh, Scotland, the only son of George Mountbatten, 2nd Marquess of Milford Haven (born Prince George of Battenberg), and Russian Countess Nadejda (Nada) de Torby, who married in 1916. His paternal grandparents were Prince Louis of Battenberg and Princess Victoria of Hesse and by Rhine. He was a great-great-grandson of Queen Victoria. Mountbatten's maternal grandparents were Grand Duke Michael Mikhailovich of Russia and his wife, Countess Sophie von Merenberg, who was descended from the House of Nassau-Weilburg through a morganatic line. He was also a descendant of the Russian writer Aleksandr Pushkin and Peter the Great's African protégé, General Abram Petrovich Gannibal.

Mountbatten grew up at the family home in Holyport, Berkshire, and enjoyed a close friendship with his first cousin Prince Philip of Greece and Denmark, later the Duke of Edinburgh. They both attended Dartmouth Naval College. He served as best man to the prince at his marriage in November 1947 to Princess Elizabeth, later Queen Elizabeth II.

He became the 3rd Marquess of Milford Haven and head of the House of Mountbatten on the death of his father on 8 April 1938.

== Navy and postwar social life ==
During the Second World War Mountbatten served in the Royal Navy. In 1942, he was appointed an Officer of the Order of the British Empire for taking the destroyer Kandahar through a minefield in an attempt to rescue the cruiser Neptune. The following year, he was awarded the Distinguished Service Cross for his work on Malta convoy operations. He retired from the Navy in 1948. He subsequently joined The Castaways' Club, which enabled him to keep in close contact with many of his naval contemporaries.

Mountbatten later played a prominent part in the London demi-monde of the 1950s, which brought together a mix of aristocrats and figures such as osteopath Stephen Ward. This set formed the nucleus for the Profumo affair.

== Personal life and death ==
Mountbatten married twice. His first marriage was to Romaine Dahlgren Pierce (17 July 1923 – 15 February 1975). She had previously been married and had a daughter. Mountbatten and Pierce were married on 4 February 1950 in Washington, D.C., and divorced in Mexico in 1954. They had no children together.

His second marriage was to Janet Mercedes Bryce (born 29 September 1937). They were married on 17 November 1960 at St Andrew's Presbyterian Church, Frognal, London. Mountbatten and Bryce had two sons, George Mountbatten, 4th Marquess of Milford Haven (born 6 June 1961) and Lord Ivar Mountbatten (born 9 March 1963).

Mountbatten died of a heart attack in London, on 14 April 1970, aged 50.

== Arms ==
Coat of arms of David Mountbatten, 3rd Marquess of Milford Haven
Coronet A Coronet of a Marquess Crest 1st: Out of a Coronet Or two Horns barry of ten Argent and Gules issuing from each three Linden Leaves Vert and from the outer side of each horn four Branches barwise having three like Leaves pendent therefrom of the last (Hesse); 2nd: Out of a Coronet Or a Plume of four Ostrich Feathers alternately Argent and Sable (Battenberg) Escutcheon Quarterly: 1st and 4th, Azure a Lion rampant double-queued barry of ten Argent and Gules armed and langued of the last crowned Or within a Bordure compony of the second and third (Hesse); 2nd and 3rd, Argent two Pallets Sable (Battenberg); charged on the honour point with an Escutcheon of the arms of Princess Alice of the United Kingdom, namely the Royal Arms differenced by a Label of three points Argent the centre point charged with a Rose Gules barbed Vert and each of the other points with an Ermine Spot Sable Supporters On either side a Lion double-queued and crowned all Or Motto In Honour Bound

Peerage of the United Kingdom
Preceded by George Mountbatten	Marquess of Milford Haven; 1938–1970	Succeeded by George Mountbatten
