= Brooksbank =

Brooksbank may refer to:

- Anne Brooksbank (born 1943), Australian writer
- Brooksbank baronets, of Healaugh Manor in the County of York, a title in the Baronetage of the United Kingdom
- Jack Brooksbank (born 1986), husband of Princess Eugenie and member of the British royal family
- Joseph Brooksbank (born 1612), English cleric and schoolmaster
- Stamp Brooksbank (1694–1756), English MP and Governor of the Bank of England
