= George Mountbatten, 4th Marquess of Milford Haven =

British peer and businessman (born 1961)

The Most Honourable The Marquess of Milford Haven

Marquess of Milford Haven
- Tenure: 14 April 1970 – present
- Predecessor: David Mountbatten
- Other titles: Earl of Medina (1961–1970)
- Born: George Ivar Louis Mountbatten; 6 June 1961 (age 65)
- Spouses: Sarah Georgina Walker (m. 1989; div. 1996) Clare Husted Steel (m. 1997)
- Issue: Lady Tatiana Dru; Henry Mountbatten, Earl of Medina
- Heir: Henry Mountbatten, Earl of Medina
- Parents: David Mountbatten, 3rd Marquess of Milford Haven; Janet Mercedes Bryce

George Ivar Louis Mountbatten, 4th Marquess of Milford Haven (born 6 June 1961), styled Earl of Medina before 1970, is a British hereditary peer and businessman.

== Biography ==
=== Family ===
Born on 6 June 1961, Lord Milford Haven is the elder son of the 3rd Marquess of Milford Haven and Janet Mercedes Bryce, the older brother of Lord Ivar Mountbatten, and a descendant of Queen Victoria, Catherine the Great, Alexander Pushkin, and Abram Gannibal. Upon the death of his father on 14 April 1970, he became the 4th Marquess of Milford Haven and head of the Mountbatten family. He is a second cousin of Charles III through their fathers.

Lord Milford Haven married, first, Sarah Georgina Walker (born London, Middlesex, 17 November 1961/2), in London on 8 March 1989. She is the daughter of Jean Maureen (née Hatton) and George Alfred Walker. She is the former wife of Andreas Antoniou (married 1985; divorced 1987). Lord Milford Haven and Walker had two children:

- Lady Tatiana Helen Georgia Mountbatten (born London, 16 April 1990), who works in public relations. She married Alexander 'Alick' Bernard Molyneux Dru (born 1991) on 23 July 2022 at Winchester Cathedral. Alick is the son of Bernard Auberon Alexander Dru and Catherine Margaret Norden. He is a great-grandson of Colonel Aubrey Herbert, great-great-grandson of Henry Herbert, 4th Earl of Carnarvon and of John Vesey, 4th Viscount de Vesci and grandnephew (by marriage) of Evelyn Waugh. They have two children:
  - Elodie Dru (b. 20 September 2023)
  - Auberon “Albie” Dru (b. 13 April 2025)
- Henry (Harry) David Louis Mountbatten, Earl of Medina (born London, 19 October 1991). He had a child from his former girlfriend, fashion stylist and social media influencer Bella Buchanan (granddaughter of Nicholas Parsons):
  - Theodore Mountbatten (b. 2024)

The couple divorced on 27 February 1996. In June 2016, Walker married Michael Spencer, Lord Spencer of Alresford.

Lord Milford Haven subsequently married Clare Husted Steel at Coatue Point in Nantucket, Massachusetts, on 20 August 1997.

=== Career ===
In 2000, Lord Milford Haven founded uSwitch, a website to help consumers compare and change suppliers of various services. The company was sold in March 2006 to the American media firm E. W. Scripps for around £210 million ($400 million).

He plays polo and Julian Hipwood has coached his teams. Lord Milford Haven won the Queen's Cup with the Broncos team in 1988 and he reached the final in 2006.

== Arms ==
Coat of arms of George Mountbatten, 4th Marquess of Milford Haven
Coronet A Coronet of a Marquess Crest 1st: Out of a Coronet Or two Horns barry of ten Argent and Gules issuing from each three Linden Leaves Vert and from the outer side of each horn four Branches barwise having three like Leaves pendent therefrom of the last (Hesse); 2nd: Out of a Coronet Or a Plume of four Ostrich Feathers alternately Argent and Sable (Battenberg) Escutcheon Quarterly: 1st and 4th, Azure a Lion rampant double-queued barry of ten Argent and Gules armed and langued of the last crowned Or within a Bordure compony of the second and third (Hesse); 2nd and 3rd, Argent two Pallets Sable (Battenberg); charged on the honour point with an Escutcheon of the arms of Princess Alice of the United Kingdom, namely the Royal Arms differenced by a Label of three points Argent the centre point charged with a Rose Gules barbed Vert and each of the other points with an Ermine Spot Sable Supporters On either side a Lion double-queued and crowned all Or Motto In Honour Bound

Peerage of the United Kingdom
Preceded by David Mountbatten	Marquess of Milford Haven; 1970–present	Incumbent; Heir apparent: Henry Mountbatten, Earl of Medina
Orders of precedence in the United Kingdom
Preceded by The Marquess of Linlithgow	Gentlemen; The Marquess of Milford Haven	Succeeded by The Marquess of Reading
Lines of succession
Preceded by Princess Clarissa of Hesse	Line of succession to the British throne descendant of Princess Alice of the United Kingdom, daughter of Queen Victoria	Succeeded by Henry Mountbatten, Earl of Medina
