= George Mountbatten, 2nd Marquess of Milford Haven =

German prince (1892–1938)

Captain The Most Honourable The Marquess of Milford Haven GCVO
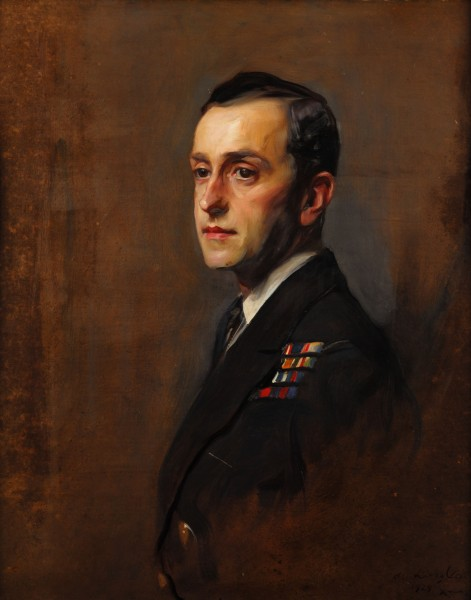
- Portrait by Philip de László, 1924
- Born: Prince George of Battenberg; 6 November 1892; New Palace, Darmstadt, Grand Duchy of Hesse, German Empire
- Died: 8 April 1938 (aged 45); London, England
- Buried: 13 April 1938; Bray, Berkshire, England
- Spouse: Countess Nadejda Mikhailovna de Torby (m. 1916)
- Issue: Lady Tatiana Mountbatten; David Mountbatten, 3rd Marquess of Milford Haven
- Father: Louis Mountbatten, 1st Marquess of Milford Haven
- Mother: Princess Victoria of Hesse and by Rhine
- Military career
- Allegiance: United Kingdom
- Branch: Royal Navy
- Service years: 1905–1932
- Rank: Captain (Retired List)
- Conflicts: First World War

Captain George Louis Victor Henry Serge Mountbatten, 2nd Marquess of Milford Haven (6 November 1892 – 8 April 1938), born Prince George of Battenberg, styled Earl of Medina between 1917 and 1921, was a Royal Navy officer and the elder son of Louis Mountbatten, 1st Marquess of Milford Haven (Prince Louis of Battenberg), and Princess Victoria of Hesse and by Rhine.

== Biography ==
George was born 6 November 1892 in Darmstadt in the Grand Duchy of Hesse, then ruled by his maternal uncle Ernest Louis, Grand Duke of Hesse. From birth, he was a prince of the Hessian royal family, albeit of a morganatic branch. His siblings were Princess Alice (mother of Prince Philip, Duke of Edinburgh, to whom he was a mentor in Philip's adolescence), Queen Louise of Sweden and Louis Mountbatten, 1st Earl Mountbatten of Burma (who assumed the role of Philip's mentor after George's death).

George followed his father into the Royal Navy, and after passing out from the Royal Naval College at Dartmouth, was promoted to sub-lieutenant on 15 January 1913. He was promoted to lieutenant on 15 February 1914, and served in the First World War. In 1917, his father and several of his relations relinquished their German names, styles and titles in exchange for British peerages at the behest of George V. Accordingly, Prince George dropped the style of Serene Highness and his surname was anglicised to "Mountbatten." When his father was created Marquess of Milford Haven in late 1917, George received the courtesy title of Earl of Medina, succeeding to his father's peerage after his death in September 1921.

Lord Milford Haven, as George was now known, remained in the Royal Navy after the war; he was promoted to lieutenant-commander on 15 February 1922 and to commander on 31 December 1926. In 1932, he retired from active service at his own request, with effect from 9 December of that year. On 6 November 1937, shortly before his death, he was promoted to the rank of captain on the retired list.

An accomplished mathematician, the Marquess "could work out complicated gunnery problems in his head" and "read books on calculus casually on trains". Queen Elizabeth II, his niece-in-law, considered him "one of the most intelligent and brilliant of people".

== Marriage and issue ==
Prince George of Battenberg, as he then was known, married Countess Nadejda Mikhailovna de Torby (daughter of Russian Grand Duke Michael Mikhailovich Romanov and his morganatic wife, Countess Sophie von Merenberg) on 15 November 1916 at the Russian Embassy, Welbeck Street, London. They lived at Lynden Manor at Holyport in Berkshire and had two children:

- Lady Tatiana Elizabeth Mountbatten (16 December 1917 – 15 May 1988).
- David Michael Mountbatten, 3rd Marquess of Milford Haven (12 May 1919 – 14 April 1970).

== Death ==
Lord Milford Haven died in London on 8 April 1938 of bone marrow cancer, aged 45. His funeral took place at St Michael's Church, Bray, Berkshire, and he was buried in Bray Parish Cemetery.

== Collection of pornography ==
George Mountbatten possessed a large collection of pornography. Upon his death, most of it was donated to the British Museum, and some was retained by the family.

== Honours ==
=== National ===
- United Kingdom:
  - Knight Commander of the Royal Victorian Order (KCVO), 15 November 1916
  - Knight Grand Cross of the Royal Victorian Order (GCVO), 1932
  - Recipient of the King George VI Coronation Medal, 1937

=== Foreign ===
- (Kingdom of Italy) Italian Royal Family: Knight of the Military Order of Savoy, authorised to wear 11 August 1917
- (Russian Empire) Russian Imperial Family: Order of St Vladimir, 4th class, with Swords, authorised to wear 5 June 1917

== Arms ==
Coat of arms of George Mountbatten, 2nd Marquess of Milford Haven
Coronet A Coronet of a Marquess Crest 1st: Out of a Coronet Or two Horns barry of ten Argent and Gules issuing from each three Linden Leaves Vert and from the outer side of each horn four Branches barwise having three like Leaves pendent therefrom of the last (Hesse); 2nd: Out of a Coronet Or a Plume of four Ostrich Feathers alternately Argent and Sable (Battenberg) Escutcheon Quarterly: 1st and 4th, Azure a Lion rampant double-queued barry of ten Argent and Gules armed and langued of the last crowned Or within a Bordure compony of the second and third (Hesse); 2nd and 3rd, Argent two Pallets Sable (Battenberg); charged on the honour point with an Escutcheon of the arms of Princess Alice of the United Kingdom, namely the Royal Arms differenced by a Label of three points Argent the centre point charged with a Rose Gules barbed Vert and each of the other points with an Ermine Spot Sable Supporters On either side a Lion double-queued and crowned all Or Motto In Honour Bound Orders The shield is surrounded by the heraldic circlet of the Royal Victorian Order, which bears the order's motto (VICTORIA), and suspended below the shield is the insignia of a Knight Grand Cross of the order (GCVO)

== Notes ==
Peerage of the United Kingdom
Preceded by Louis Mountbatten	Marquess of Milford Haven; 1921–1938	Succeeded by David Mountbatten
