= Clare Mountbatten, Marchioness of Milford Haven =

British journalist and aristocrat (born 1960)

The Most Honourable The Marchioness of Milford Haven
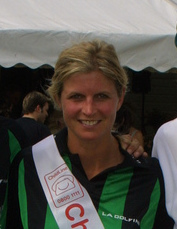
- The Marchioness in 2003
- Born: Clare Husted Steel; 2 September 1960 (age 66)
- Spouses: Nicholas Wentworth-Stanley (m. 1985; div. 1997) George Mountbatten, 4th Marquess of Milford Haven (m. 1997)
- Issue: 3
- Parents: Anthony Nigel Steel; Anne Husted
- Occupation: Journalist

Clare Husted Mountbatten, Marchioness of Milford Haven (née Steel, formerly Wentworth-Stanley; born 2 September 1960), is a British aristocrat, journalist, polo player and brand ambassador. In 2018, the Marchioness co-founded the charity James' Place.

== Biography ==
Lady Milford Haven is the daughter of Anthony Nigel Steel of Rock House Farm, Lower Froyle, Hampshire, and his wife, Anne Husted. She has one brother and one sister.

Her sister, Louise Helen Steel (born 1956), married Count Don Ludovico del Balzo, dei Duchi di Presenzano, son of Count Don Giulio del Balzo, dei Duchi di Presenzano and Donna Maria Elisabetta, dei Marchese Cavalletti dell'Oliveto Sabino, on 30 April 1983; they have three children.

The Marchioness enjoys playing polo. Until 2020, she was an ambassador of the watch company Jaeger-LeCoultre for over 15 years, and she was made a brand ambassador for Arthur J. Gallagher & Co. in 2019. She has also worked as a journalist and was a special editor for the Tatler magazine between October 1998 – 2006, and has also written for magazines such as GQ, The Times, Homes & Gardens.

=== James' place ===
After the family tragedy of losing her son James to suicide in 2006, she later co-founded the charity James' Place in England during 2018. The original location in Liverpool operated as the first non-clinic suicide crisis centre in the UK, several locations were added to the Marchioness' charity in Newcastle upon Tyne and London, and through fundraising, the charity plans to raise £10 million more to open new locations in Birmingham and Bristol in the future (c. 2023). She was also made a co-chair for the British Alliance of Suicide Prevention Charities (TASC) in 2010.

== Marriages and children ==
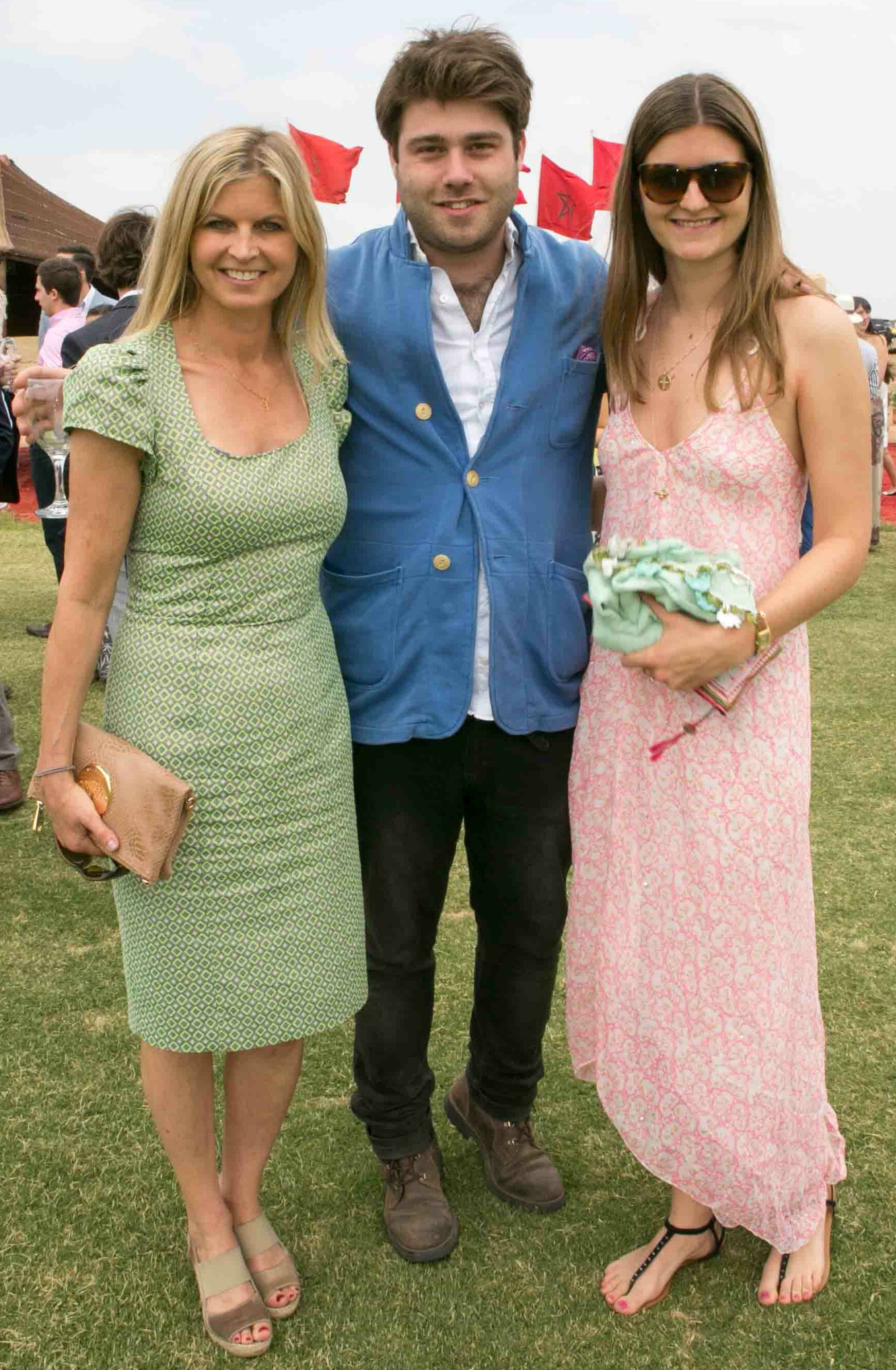
Mountbatten (left) with daughter Louisa Wentworth Stanley (right), and Archie Standing at British Polo Day Morocco 2014

She married Nicholas Philip Wentworth-Stanley (born 1954), a Lloyd's List's underwriter and great-grandson of Major Sir Charles Wentworth-Stanley, in 1985; they later divorced in 1997. With her first husband, she had three children:

- James Nicholas (Nick) Wentworth-Stanley (1985–2006), studied at Harrow School and Newcastle University, and, like his mother, an accomplished polo player.
- Harry David Wentworth-Stanley (born 1989), married Cressida Bonas. They have a son, Wilbur James Wentworth-Stanley (born in November 2022) and a daughter, Delphina Pandora Wentworth-Stanley (born in June 2025).
- Louisa Clare Wentworth-Stanley (born 1993), engaged to Ludovic Sebastian Ziani de Ferranti.

She married George Mountbatten, 4th Marquess of Milford Haven in Nantucket, Massachusetts, on 20 August 1997, without issue.
