= Assassination of Lord Mountbatten =

1979 bomb attack in Mullaghmore, Ireland

Coordinates: 54.4638°N 8.4392°W

- Part of the Troubles
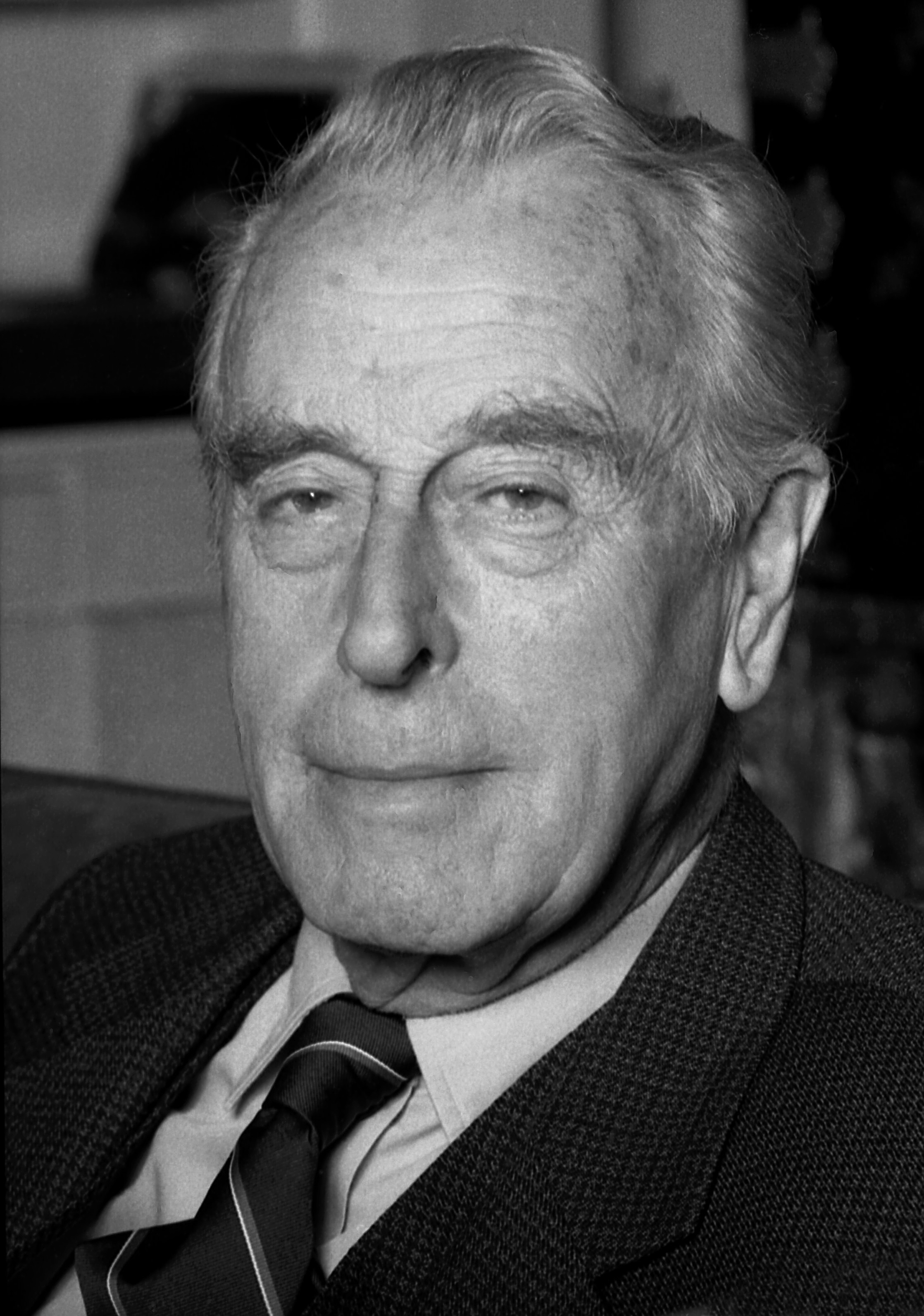
- Mountbatten in 1976
- Location: Mullaghmore Peninsula, Ireland
- Date: 27 August 1979
- Target: Lord Mountbatten
- Weapon: Bomb
- Deaths: Lord Mountbatten; Nicholas Knatchbull; Paul Maxwell; Lady Brabourne
- Injuries: Patricia Knatchbull; Lord Brabourne; Timothy Knatchbull
- Perpetrator: Provisional IRA
- Assailant: Thomas McMahon
- Motive: Irish republicanism
- Charges: Murder
- Convicted: Thomas McMahon

Lord Mountbatten, a retired British statesman and cousin to Queen Elizabeth II, was assassinated on 27 August 1979 off the coast of Mullaghmore, Ireland. Thomas McMahon, an Irish republican and a volunteer for the Provisional Irish Republican Army (IRA), planted a bomb on Mountbatten's boat, the cabin cruiser Shadow V, during Mountbatten's annual summer trip to Classiebawn Castle, his house on the Mullaghmore Peninsula.

The IRA had planned the attack for several months. A bomb team, which included McMahon, constructed a device containing fifty pounds (23 kg) of the explosive gelignite. McMahon placed this on Shadow V on the night of 26 August 1979 before he and his accomplice, Francis McGirl, drove away. They were arrested during a routine stop eighty miles (130 km) from Mullaghmore. McGirl did not have the papers to prove his identity or ownership of the car, and so both men were held by the Garda Síochána, the Irish national police force.

The bomb was detonated less than two hours later, killing Mountbatten, his grandson Nicholas and Nicholas's grandmother Doreen. Also killed was Paul Maxwell, a boy who was crewing for Mountbatten. Three other passengers were severely injured. When news of the bombing broke, McMahon and McGirl were charged. Five hours after the bomb went off, the IRA ambushed a British Army patrol with two roadside bombs, killing eighteen British soldiers. The attacks were condemned by world leaders and by the media in both the UK and Ireland.

The investigation by the Garda Síochána found traces of nitroglycerine and ammonium nitrate, two of the ingredients of gelignite, on the clothing of McMahon and McGirl. The tests also found flakes of green and white paint, which matched the paint from Shadow V, on McMahon's boots and jacket, and sand from Mullaghmore in his boots' treads. McMahon was sentenced to life imprisonment in November 1979; McGirl was acquitted.

The bombing led to Margaret Thatcher, the British prime minister, changing the UK's strategy towards Northern Ireland. She introduced an approach in which the intelligence services took a more active role; she appointed Maurice Oldfield as an inter-service intelligence co-ordinator. Donations to NORAID, the US-based organisation that raised funds for the IRA, declined. American intelligence and law enforcement became more proactive in investigating IRA arms procurement in the US, and the Federal Bureau of Investigation set up a specialist unit to combat weapons smuggling to Ireland.

== Background ==
=== The Troubles in the late 1970s ===
The Troubles were the conflict in Northern Ireland between unionists (mostly Ulster Protestants) and republicans (mostly Irish Catholics), which began in the late 1960s. (Note: The start date of the Troubles is a matter of debate. Early dates focus on the formation of the Ulster Volunteer Force in 1966; the later dates are based on the deployment of British troops on 14 August 1969. The Northern Ireland Troubles (Legacy and Reconciliation) Act 2023 defined the start of the Troubles as 1 January 1966 for the purposes of the act.) The unionists—also known as loyalists—want Northern Ireland to remain within the United Kingdom; republicans want Northern Ireland to leave the UK and join a united Ireland.

The Provisional Irish Republican Army (IRA) was a paramilitary group that wanted to bring about Irish reunification through armed struggle. In 1976 they assassinated Christopher Ewart-Biggs, the British ambassador to Ireland, in Dublin. Two IRA gunmen shot dead Sir Richard Sykes, the British ambassador in The Hague in March 1979; that month Airey Neave, the Shadow Secretary of State for Northern Ireland, was assassinated by the Irish National Liberation Army (INLA)—a rival republican paramilitary group to the IRA—in a car bomb attack in the Palace of Westminster. Neave had been the political mentor and a close friend of Margaret Thatcher—the leader of the Opposition—and had run her campaign when she was elected to lead the Conservative Party in 1975. Thatcher was described by her biographer Jonathan Aitken as being "numb with shock" at the news of his death.

=== Lord Mountbatten ===
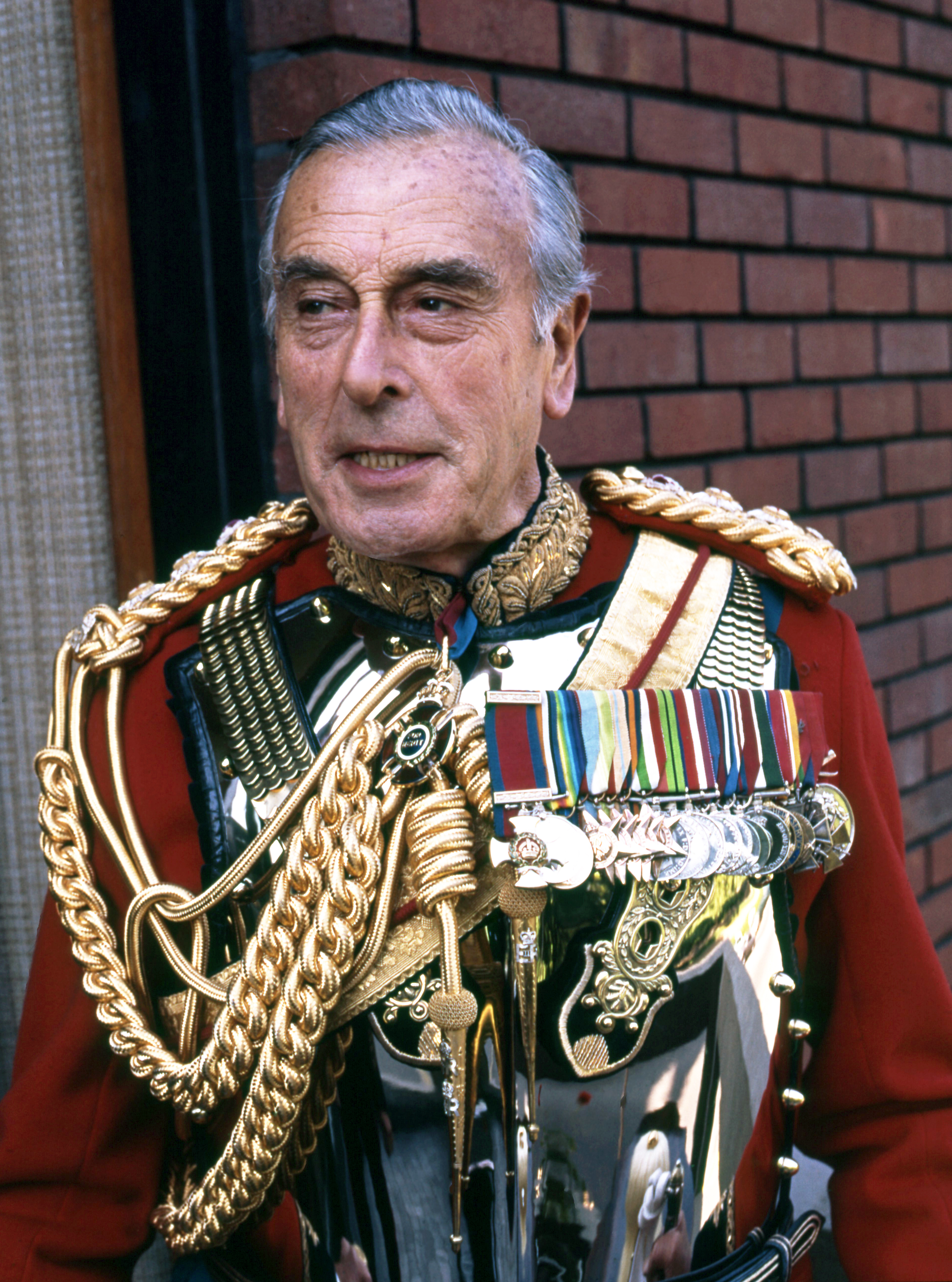
Mountbatten in the uniform of colonel-in-chief of the Household Cavalry, 1972

Lord Mountbatten was a British statesman, Royal Navy officer and cousin to Queen Elizabeth II. He was a member of the prominent Battenberg family, a great-grandson of Queen Victoria, the maternal uncle of Prince Philip, Duke of Edinburgh, and a second cousin of King George VI. Mountbatten saw service in the Royal Navy during the First World War and was appointed Supreme Allied Commander, South East Asia Command, in the Second World War, where he oversaw the recapture of Burma (December 1944 – August 1945) and Singapore (September 1945) from the Japanese. He later served as the last viceroy of India and briefly as the first governor-general of the Dominion of India. During the 1950s he was the commander-in-chief of the British Mediterranean Fleet and NATO Commander Allied Forces Mediterranean and First Sea Lord. He then served as the chief of the defence staff until 1965, and for a year as the chairman of the NATO Military Committee. (Note: The Chief of the Defence Staff is the professional head of the United Kingdom's Armed Forces; the First Sea Lord is the professional head of the Royal Navy.)

Mountbatten had spent thirty years holidaying during the summer at Classiebawn Castle on the Mullaghmore Peninsula near Cliffoney, County Sligo, Ireland. The castle was a country house built for Lord Palmerston and was owned by Lady Mountbatten. Mountbatten kept the twenty-eight-foot-long (8.5 m) cabin cruiser Shadow V, which he used for fishing, in the local harbour; the boat was largely unguarded. (Note: Sources differ on the level of protection on Shadow V. Some sources state there was no guard; others that it was unguarded during the night.)

=== Thomas McMahon and Francis McGirl ===
Thomas McMahon, a carpenter who lived in Carrickmacross, County Monaghan, was one of the IRA's explosives officers in south County Armagh. An Garda Síochána had no record of him being a republican activist, although he had been detained several years prior to the bombing when he was found in possession of an IRA constitution; he had appeared in the Republic of Ireland's Special Criminal Court twice, (Note: The Special Criminal Court has three judges but no jury and is used for conducting cases involving paramilitary and organised crimes.) accused of IRA membership, but was acquitted on both occasions. He was known to be friends with Seán Mac Stíofáin and Seamus Twomey, both former IRA chiefs of staff. McMahon was also a suspect in the 1974 Birmingham pub bombings.

McMahon's accomplice was Francis McGirl; he lived in Ballinamore, County Leitrim, where he was a gravedigger. He was the nephew of John Joe McGirl, a former IRA chief of staff.

== Build-up and McMahon's actions ==
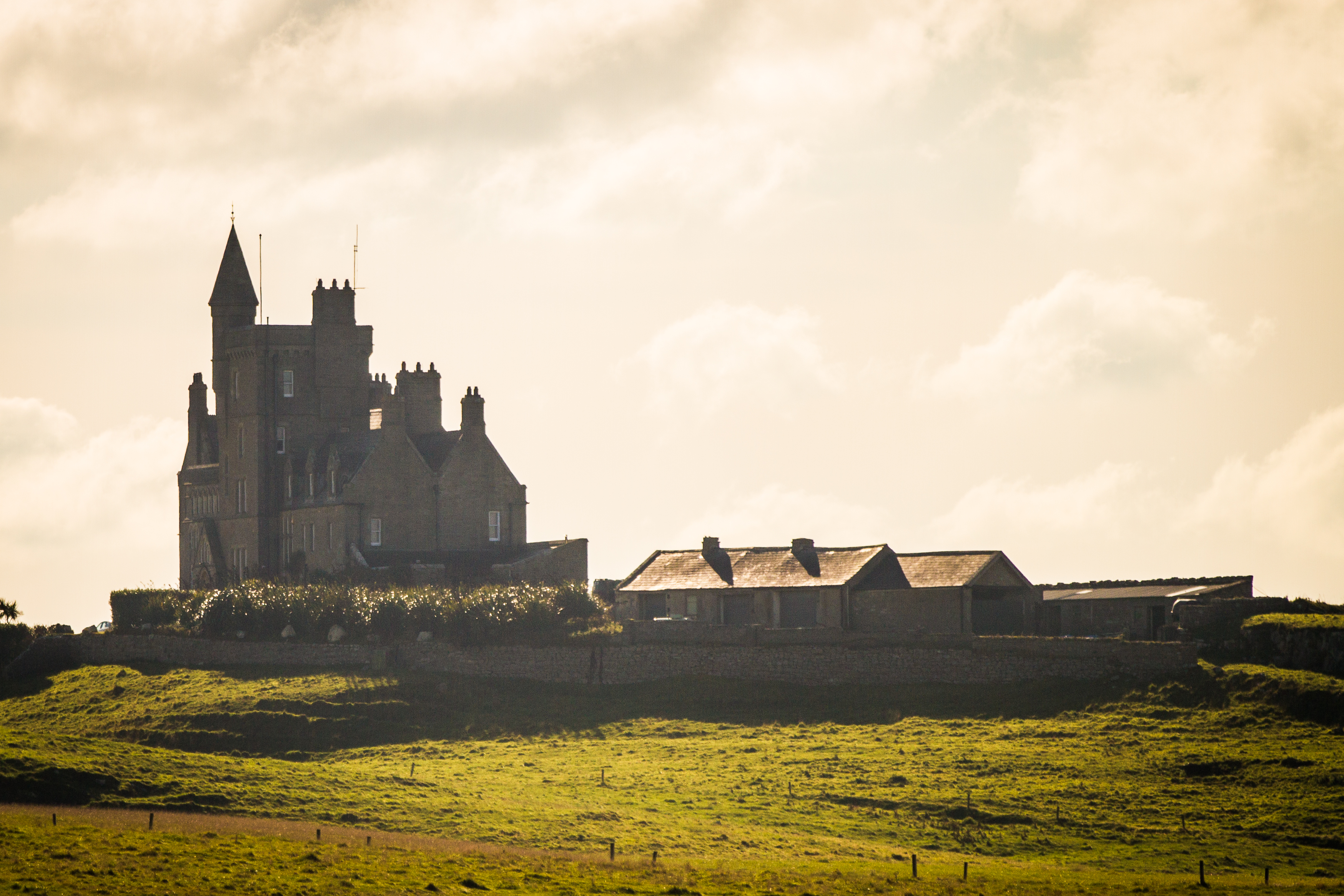
Classiebawn Castle, County Sligo

Because of his connection to the royal family, the IRA had considered the assassination of Mountbatten since 1970. When asked if he was concerned he could be a target for the IRA, Mountbatten dismissed the threat and insisted on light military and police protection, saying "what would they want with an old man like me?" From the start of the Troubles he was given a twelve-man security detail, which had risen to twenty-eight by 1974. The detail comprised uniformed and plainclothes members of the Garda Síochána, the Irish Special Branch and the British Special Air Service (SAS). Mountbatten disliked close security and refused to allow members of his Garda protection detail onto his boat, or to be nearby in a speedboat when he went out fishing.

In the early 1970s a plan to kill Mountbatten was cancelled by the IRA leadership because of the risk to civilians. In 1976 steps were taken to assassinate him, but an IRA ceasefire stopped the operation; in August 1978 a plan to shoot him on board his boat did not proceed because the choppy waters made a sniper shot too difficult. According to the journalist Annabel Ferriman, following the assassination of Airey Neave by the INLA, "a counter-coup by the IRA was felt by them to be necessary". With increased threats against him, the police advised Mountbatten not to holiday in Ireland in 1979; Maurice Oldfield—who had been the director of MI6 until 1978—advised him that members of the royal family were being targeted.

The IRA planned the attack on Mountbatten for several months. While some constructed the bomb, others focused on reconnaissance. They reported that a planned boat trip on Monday 27 August to Mountbatten's lobster pots was probably the last opportunity to bomb him on the boat that year. The bombers—which included McMahon—constructed a device containing fifty pounds (23 kg) of gelignite. In 2024 the former IRA commander Michael Hayes stated that he had been the explosives expert who built the bomb, aided by McMahon.

During Mountbatten's 1979 holiday an SAS corporal on his protection detail reported that Shadow V was a soft target that was kept in a publicly accessible harbour. The corporal also reported seeing a car with Belfast number plates whose driver appeared to be watching the boat. The car was recognised as one that had previously been used to carry IRA bombs, but no action was taken.

On the night of 26–27 August 1979 the bomb was planted on Shadow V; it contained a radio-controlled detonator and was placed below where Mountbatten was known to sit on board. Several sources state McMahon was the one who planted the device; others say it was McGirl that did so. The two men then got into a yellow Ford Cortina to travel to Strokestown, County Roscommon, with McGirl driving. They then switched to a second car, a red Ford Escort. At 9:55 am the car was stopped eighty miles (130 km) from Mullaghmore by Garda James Lohan, who was conducting routine vehicle tax and insurance checks in the town of Granard, County Longford. McGirl gave a false name and said he had no papers or identification on him; Lohan was suspicious of McGirl's story as to why he was driving a car that did not belong to him, and he noticed the driver's hands were shaking. Lohan took both men into custody in the nearby Garda station.

== Assassination ==
Shadow V; Mountbatten, wearing white, sits on the left, at the stern of the boat.

At 11:15 am on 27 August, Mountbatten left Classiebawn Castle and travelled the fifteen minutes to the local harbour where Shadow V was kept. He was accompanied by his daughter Lady Patricia Brabourne, her husband Lord Brabourne, their twin sons Timothy and Nicholas Knatchbull, the twins' paternal grandmother Doreen Knatchbull (the Dowager Lady Brabourne) and Paul Maxwell, a fifteen-year-old from Enniskillen, Northern Ireland, who was working as a boatboy. (Note: Maxwell's family had a holiday home in Mullaghmore and he had also been employed as a boatboy the previous summer. He helped maintain the vessel and would take it out for a run each day.) Police accompanied them from the castle to the boat and then drove to watch them from the nearby clifftop.

After ten minutes' sailing the boat reached the lobster pots, where it slowed; Mountbatten was at the helm. As it reached the pots, the bomb was detonated by remote control from the shore by an unknown man using the modified controls for a model aeroplane. The explosion lifted the boat out of the water and completely destroyed it. Maxwell and Nicholas Knatchbull were both killed instantly. Mountbatten's legs were almost completely blown off and he was thrown into the water face down, still alive. In 2009 Timothy Knatchbull recalled the explosion:

My grandfather was at the helm three or four feet behind me and slightly to my right. The gelignite under the deck must have been between us because as we rose into the air we went in different directions. I remember a sensation, as if I had been hit with a club, and a tearing sound. I do not remember my journey through the air or hitting the water but before the debris finished raining down, I was unconscious and about a hundred feet from my grandfather.

Detective Henry, one of the Garda officers, was watching from the cliffs. He recalled that:

The noise was tremendous, terrifying. There was a huge mushroom-shaped cloud of smoke and multi-coloured flashes. This cloud rose high above me, and then started to disappear. There was debris in the sky and on the sea and I was hit with a huge shower of sea-spray. I could hear screams of panic and pain.

Local fishing boats were quickly at the scene. Mountbatten was still breathing when he was pulled from the water, but died within minutes. Doreen Knatchbull was badly injured when she was rescued. By the time the boats returned to Mullaghmore harbour, two doctors—on holiday from Belfast—had improvised a first aid post; locals provided doors for use as makeshift stretchers and broom handles for splints. The wounded were transported to Sligo General Hospital. Timothy Knatchbull and Doreen Knatchbull were the more serious casualties; they were the first to be operated on. She was operated on through the night, but died from internal injuries and shock the following morning. Lord Brabourne had badly broken legs, which were saved by surgeons. The IRA claimed responsibility five hours after the bombing.

== Warrenpoint ==
The north of Ireland, showing the approximate positions of the Mountbatten attack and the Warrenpoint ambush

The same day as Mountbatten's assassination, the IRA attacked the British Army at Narrow Water Castle outside Warrenpoint, County Down, on the east coast of the island, near the Irish border. The IRA South Armagh Brigade set off a 1,100-pound (500 kg) roadside bomb packed into milk churns. (Note: This is sometimes described as a 700-pound (320 kg) device or an 800-pound (360 kg) one.) This exploded at 4:40 pm as an army convoy drove past. Six members of the Parachute Regiment were killed instantly. The remains of the convoy then came under gunfire from a position on the Irish side of the border.

Reinforcements, including medics, were sent and a command point was set up at the castle's gatehouse. At 5:12 pm a second bomb, placed in milk churns at the gatehouse, exploded; ten men from the Parachute Regiment and two from the Queen's Own Highlanders were killed. This was a 1,000-pound (450 kg) device operated by a decoder device in a Tupperware box. (Note: This is sometimes described as an 800-pound (360 kg) device.) The explosion was so fierce that all that was found of the senior officer who had arrived with the reinforcements—Lieutenant Colonel David Blair, the commanding officer of the Queen's Own Highlanders—was one of his epaulettes. Eighteen soldiers were killed in the two explosions, sixteen of whom were from the Parachute Regiment: it was the biggest loss of life in a single incident for the latter since the Second World War.

== Reactions ==
The assassination was condemned by world leaders. (Note: This included Chancellor Helmut Schmidt of Germany, President Neelam Sanjiva Reddy of India, Prime Minister Francesco Cossiga of Italy, Prime Minister Pierre Werner of Luxembourg, Prime Minister Robert Muldoon of New Zealand, President-elect Shehu Shagari of Nigeria, Prime Minister Odvar Nordli of Norway, Prime Minister Ferdinand Marcos of the Philippines, Prime Minister P. W. Botha of South Africa, Prime Minister Kriangsak Chamanan of Thailand, President Jimmy Carter of the United States and President Josip Broz Tito of Yugoslavia.) Jack Lynch, the taoiseach, said he was "horrified and saddened" by the killing, adding that the IRA "has brought death and sorrow to many thousands of innocent people and shame to all true Irish men and women". The US Department of State said: "Americans will especially recall his great contribution to our common cause in World War II as well as his many services to this country and to the world since then." Pope John Paul II was due to visit both Ireland and Northern Ireland, with a trip to Armagh, but the Northern Ireland part was cancelled following what the Vatican described as "the brutal crimes" of the attacks on Mountbatten and the Warrenpoint ambush; the Pope described the assassination as "an insult to human dignity". Three days of state mourning were announced in Burma (now Myanmar), while in India a week of mourning was observed. (Note: As the Supreme Allied Commander, South East Asia Command, his command oversaw the recapture of Burma from the Japanese. When he was created a viscount in 1946, he chose the title "Viscount Mountbatten of Burma".)

The British press condemned the attack, with the tabloid press expressing rage in their headlines, including the front page headlines in The Daily Express ("These Evil Bastards") and The Sun ("May the Bastards Rot in Hell"). An Phoblacht (The Republic)—the republican newspaper published by Sinn Féin, the political party associated with the IRA—carried a statement from the IRA in which they described the murders as "a discriminate act to bring to the attention of the English people the continuing occupation of our country". The statement continued:

The British Army acknowledge that after ten years of war it cannot defeat us but yet the British government continue with the oppression of our people and the torture of our comrades in the H-Blocks. Well, for this we will tear out their sentimental, imperialist heart.

The Irish media was also condemnatory of the attack; in The Irish Press, Tim Pat Coogan wrote that the IRA's statement contained:

Not a word of sympathy for the victims, two of them mere children, not a hint of regret, not a scintilla of compassion. Murder, whatever the supposed cause, never can be justified. But the murder of Lord Mountbatten—and that, it needs to be emphasised, is what it was—was particularly cruel. A friend of this country ... a friendly, genial man, popular with local people, blown to pieces while on one of his regular visits to this country. ... In their statement the Provisionals talk of his murder as "an execution". The execution of a 79-year-old man? Such hypocrisy will sicken and disgust all Irish people.

Thatcher—prime minister of the newly elected government—hypothesised that the bombers had some links with Libya. Investigations by the security services showed no such connection, and that there was "no evidence that any member of this team has visited Libya". The counter-terrorism consultant Andy Oppenheimer states the IRA received £2 million from Syria, through a contact in the Palestine Liberation Organisation, for the murder of Mountbatten and other acts. (Note: £2 million in 1979 equates to approximately £9,850,000 in 2025, according to calculations based on the Consumer Price Index measure of inflation.) Others had different theories: James Molyneaux—the leader of the Ulster Unionist Party (UUP)—and Enoch Powell—the UUP MP for South Down—alleged involvement by the American Central Intelligence Agency in Mountbatten's death, as part of a scheme to get Ireland to join NATO, although this was deemed nothing more than a conspiracy theory.

The British government had pressed the government of Ireland over the cross-border aspect of IRA activity for some time; the death of Mountbatten in Ireland and the shooting at the survivors from south of the border at Warrenpoint, Britain argued, proved it. Thatcher asked Lynch to take action in the wake of the two attacks. The requested measures included closer cooperation between MI6 and the Irish Special Branch; that members of the Royal Ulster Constabulary (RUC) could attend Garda interviews of suspects; and to allow British helicopters to fly up to nine point three miles (15 km) into Irish airspace in pursuit of IRA units. Lynch allowed overflights of up to three point one miles (5 km); when news of this became public, he was forced to resign.

== Investigation and trial ==
The Garda collected the debris from the boat, including using diver units to recover the engine and parts of the bomb, which were in thirty feet (9 m) of water; the aim was to rebuild the boat to establish the type of device used. The forensic investigation was headed by James Donovan, Ireland's most senior forensic scientist.

On 29 August McMahon and McGirl appeared in the Special Criminal Court in Dublin. They were released on a technicality but rearrested straight away and charged with being members of the IRA; the following day they were charged with the murders. (Note: The men had been arrested twice under section 30 of the Offences against the State Act. A recent case in the High Court had directed that people could only be arrested once under that section, so the detention was deemed illegal.) Forensic tests showed traces of nitroglycerine and ammonium nitrate, two of the ingredients of gelignite, on the clothing of both men. The tests also found flakes of green and white paint, which matched the paint from Shadow V, on McMahon's boots and jacket, and sand from Mullaghmore in his boots' treads.

The case against McMahon and McGirl opened on 5 November 1979 at the Special Criminal Court. The trial concluded on 23 November; McMahon was found guilty and sentenced to life imprisonment. McGirl, on whom no traces of paint or explosives were located, was acquitted. McMahon reappeared in court in January 1980 on the separate charge of being a member of the IRA. He swore on oath that he was not a member, and had not been so at the time of the bombing; the charges were dismissed.

== Funerals ==
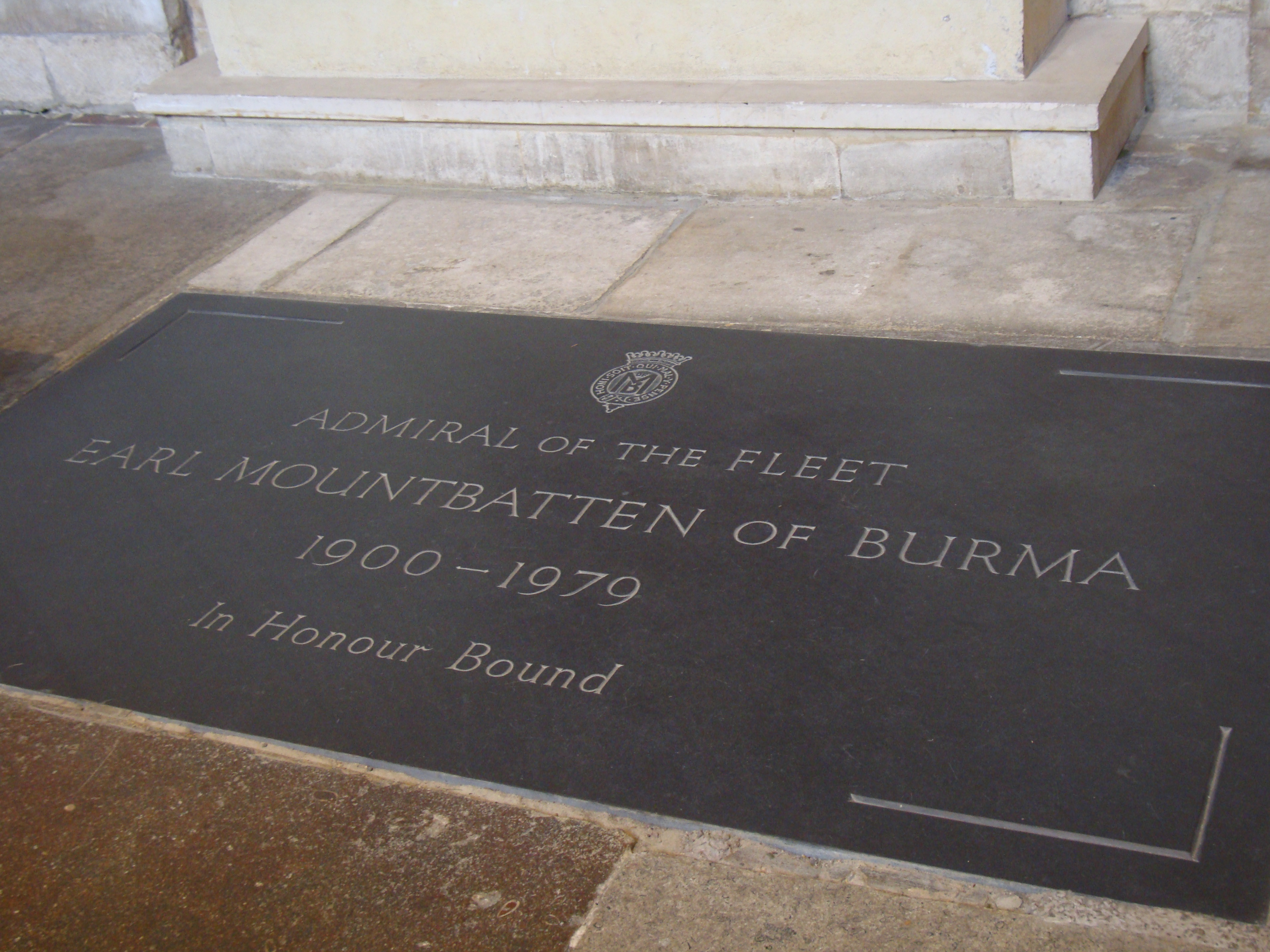
Mountbatten's tomb in Romsey Abbey

Maxwell's funeral took place on 29 August 1979 in Enniskillen. On 6 September the joint funeral of Lady Brabourne and Nicholas Knatchbull took place at the family church in Mersham, Kent.

Mountbatten's ceremonial funeral was held on 5 September 1979 at Westminster Abbey, under tight security; he had planned his funeral for over ten years and it reflected all aspects of his life. It was attended by the Queen, members of the royal family, members of fourteen other royal houses, Thatcher, all of her surviving predecessors and Lynch. Thousands of people turned out for the funeral procession, which began at Wellington Barracks, including representatives of the three services and military contingents from France, Burma, India, Canada and the US. His coffin was carried on the State Funeral Gun Carriage and was also accompanied by 118 members of the Royal Navy. The funeral service was televised on BBC1 and the Prince of Wales read Psalm 107. (Note: Part of psalm 107 reads "They that go down to the sea in ships, that do business in great waters; These see the works of the Lord, and his wonders in the deep." The nautical theme of the funeral continued with the final hymn, "For Those in Peril on the Sea".) Mountbatten was buried in Romsey Abbey, Hampshire, on the same day.

== Legacy ==
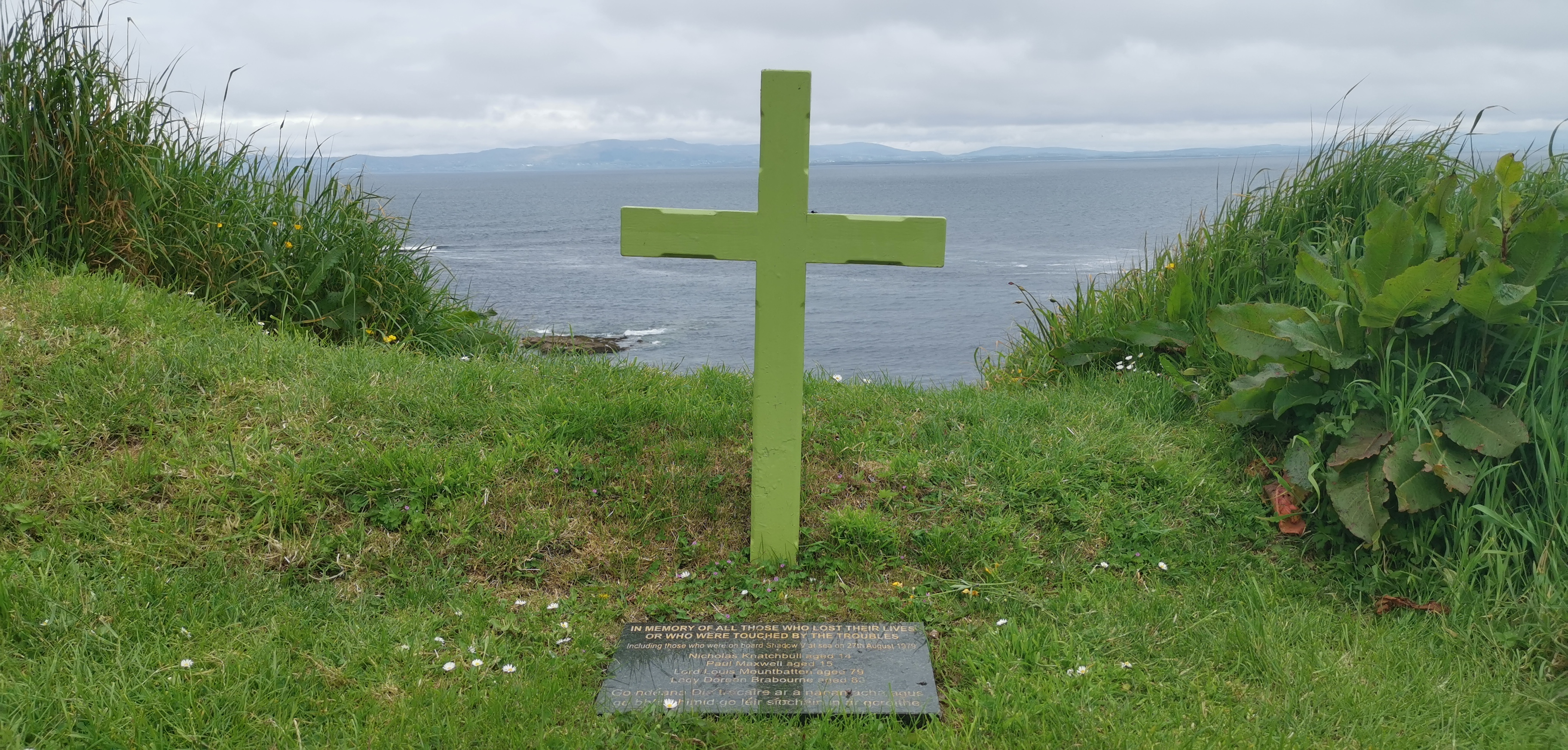
Memorial near Mullaghmore

Thatcher was only four months into her premiership when the assassination and the deaths at Warrenpoint occurred. According to Eamonn Kennedy, the Irish ambassador to the UK between 1978 and 1983, Mountbatten's murder—and that of Neave and those of British soldiers—"left deep psychological scars" on what he called Thatcher's "Irish outlook". Although she wanted to focus on domestic economic matters, the events ensured that Northern Ireland occupied a central place in her political agenda and she visited the region at the end of August 1979. There was a political struggle between the army and the RUC as to which should be the primary force countering terrorism in Northern Ireland. Rather than undertake any heavy-handed measures, which had backfired in the past, (Note: Previous British reactions included actions such as internment without trial, a move that had boosted republican support and IRA membership.) Thatcher introduced an approach in which the intelligence services took a more active role and appointed Maurice Oldfield—the former director of MI6—as an inter-service intelligence co-ordinator.

Mountbatten's murder led to a loss of sympathy for the IRA's cause among the Irish-American community. This brought about a further decline in donations to NORAID, the US-based organisation that raised funds for the IRA; donations had been falling since the mid-1970s. The murder resulted in an increased awareness within US intelligence circles of IRA arms procurement. In May 1980 the FBI established a unit in New York to investigate those smuggling weapons between the east coast of the US and Ireland.

In March 1995 McGirl was driving a tractor when it overturned, killing him instantly. While in Mountjoy Prison, Dublin, McMahon renounced his connection with the IRA. After nineteen years in prison he was paroled from his life sentence in 1998 under the terms of the Good Friday Agreement, as part of the Northern Ireland peace process. In 2021 Mary Lou McDonald, the leader of Sinn Féin, apologised for the assassination.

== Notes and references ==
=== Sources ===
==== Books ====
- Adams, James (1986). The Financing of Terror. Sevenoaks, Kent: New English Library. ISBN 978-0-4500-6086-1.
- Aitken, Jonathan (2013). Margaret Thatcher: Power and Personality. New York: Bloomsbury. ISBN 978-1-62040-342-6.
- Aldrich, Richard J.; Cormac, Rory (2022). Spying and the Crown: The Secret Relationship Between British Intelligence and the Royals. London: Atlantic Books. ISBN 978-1-7864-9914-1.
- Baker, George (1959). Mountbatten of Burma. London: Cassell. OCLC 4992039.
- Barton, Brian; Roche, Patrick J. (1994). The Northern Ireland Question: Perspectives and Policies. Aldershot, Hampshire: Avebury. ISBN 978-1-8562-8881-1.
- Bell, J. Bowyer (1993a). IRA Tactics and Targets. Swords, Dublin: Poolbeg Press. ISBN 978-1-85371-257-9.
- Bell, J. Bowyer (1993b). The Irish Troubles: A Generation of Violence, 1967–1992. New York: St. Martin's Press. ISBN 978-0-3120-8827-9.
- Bell, J. Bowyer (2000). The IRA, 1968–2000: Analysis of a Secret Army. London: Frank Cass. ISBN 978-1-1363-3308-8.
- Bland, Olivia (1986). The Royal Way of Death. London: Constable. ISBN 978-0-0946-5430-3.
- Carroll, Rory (2023). Killing Thatcher. London: HarperCollins Publishers Limited. ISBN 978-0-0084-7666-3.
- Conlon, Tommy; McGreevy, Ronan (2023). Kidnapping: A Hostage, a Desperate Manhunt and a Bloody Rescue that Shocked Ireland. London: Penguin Books. ISBN 978-1-8448-8663-0.
- Davis, Lee (1993). Assassination: Twenty Assassinations that Changed History. Abingdon, Oxfordshire: TransEdition Books. ISBN 978-1-8982-5011-1.
- Fay, Marie-Therese; Morrisey, Mike; Smyth, Marie (1999). Northern Ireland's Troubles: The Human Costs. London: Pluto Press. ISBN 978-1-8496-4027-5.
- Hanley, Brian (2018). The Impact of the Troubles on the Republic of Ireland, 1968-79. Manchester University Press. ISBN 978-0-7190-9113-1.
- Harnden, Toby (2000). 'Bandit Country': The IRA and South Armagh. London: Coronet. ISBN 978-0-3407-1737-0.
- Hernon, Ian (2007). Assassin! 200 Years of British Political Murder. London: Pluto Press. ISBN 978-0-7453-2716-7.
- Karmon, Eli (2005). Coalitions Between Terrorist Organizations: Revolutionaries, Nationalists and Islamists. Leiden: Martinus Nijhoff. ISBN 978-9-0041-4358-6.
- Kelly, Stephen (2021). Margaret Thatcher, the Conservative Party and the Northern Ireland Conflict, 1975–1990. London: Bloomsbury Academic. ISBN 978-1-3501-1537-8.
- Knatchbull, Timothy (2009). From a Clear Blue Sky. London: Hutchinson. ISBN 978-0-09-193146-9.
- Mara, Sandra (2009). Dead Men Talk. Dublin: Poolbeg Books. ISBN 978-1-8422-3365-8.
- McDonald, Henry; Cusack, Jim (2005). The UDA: Inside the Heart of Loyalist Terror. London: Penguin Books. ISBN 978-1-8448-8021-8.
- McKittrick, David (1999). Lost Lives: The Stories of the Men, Women and Children who Died as a Result of the Northern Ireland Troubles. Edinburgh: Mainstream. ISBN 978-1-8401-8227-9.
- Moloney, Ed (2003). A Secret History of the IRA. London: Penguin. ISBN 978-0-1410-1041-0.
- Mulholland, Marc (2012). "'Just Another Country'? The Irish Question in the Thatcher Years". In Jackson, Ben; Saunders, Robert (eds.). Making Thatcher's Britain. Cambridge: Cambridge University Press. pp. 180–196. ISBN 978-0-5119-9816-4.
- Mumford, Andrew (2017). Counterinsurgency Wars and the Anglo-American Alliance: The Special Relationship on the Rocks. Washington, DC: Georgetown University Press. ISBN 978-1-6261-6491-8.
- Oppenheimer, A. R. (2009). IRA, the Bombs and the Bullets: A History of Deadly Ingenuity. Dublin: Irish Academic Press. ISBN 978-0-7165-2894-4.
- Reddy, Tom (1990). Murder Will Out: A Book of Irish Murder Cases. Dublin: Gill and Macmillan. ISBN 978-0-7171-1787-1.
- Ross, Josephine (1981). Lord Mountbatten. London: Hamilton. ISBN 978-0-2411-0593-1.
- Wynn, Douglas (2003). On Trial for Murder: Over 200 of the Most Dramatic Trials of the 20th Century. London: Pan. ISBN 978-0-3304-3748-6.
- Ziegler, Philip (1986). Mountbatten. New York: Harper & Row. ISBN 978-0-0609-7022-2.

==== Journals and magazines ====
- Ball, Simon (March 2013). "The Assassination Culture of Imperial Britain, 1909–1979". The Historical Journal. 56 (1): 231–256. doi:10.1017/S0018246X1200060X.
- Ball, Simon (March 2019). "The State and the Assassination Threat in Britain, 1971–1984". The Historical Journal. 62 (1): 241–265. doi:10.1017/S0018246X17000401.
- "The Death of Lord Mountbatten". Summary of World Broadcasts (The Far East. Part III). Monitoring Service of the British Broadcasting Corporation. August 1979.
- English, Richard (July 2013). "Terrorist Innovation and International Politics: Lessons from an IRA Case Study?". International Politics. 50 (4): 496–511. doi:10.1057/ip.2013.18.
- Kowalski, Rachel Caroline (4 July 2018). "The Role of Sectarianism in the Provisional IRA Campaign, 1969–1997". Terrorism and Political Violence. 30 (4): 658–683. doi:10.1080/09546553.2016.1205979.
- Patterson, Henry (July 2013). "The Provisional IRA, the Irish Border and Anglo-Irish Relations During the Troubles". Small Wars & Insurgencies. 24 (3): 493–517. doi:10.1080/09592318.2013.802607.
- Wilson, Andrew J. (March 2007). "Ulster Unionists in America, 1972–1985". New Hibernia Review. 11 (1): 50–73. doi:10.1353/nhr.2007.0017.

==== Legislation ====
- "Northern Ireland Troubles (Legacy and Reconciliation) Act 2023: Section 1(1)(a)". The National Archives. 2023.

==== News ====
- Allen-Mills, Tony (6 September 1979). "Queen Leads Mourning". The Daily Telegraph. pp. 1–2.
- Downie Jr., Leonard (28 August 1979). "IRA Bomb Kills Lord Mountbatten". The Washington Post.
- Ezard, John (6 September 1979). "Mountbatten's Final Bequest". The Guardian. pp. 1–2.
- Ferriman, Annabel (24 November 1979a). "One Man Gets Life Sentence for Murder of Lord Mountbatten". The Times. pp. 1–2.
- Ferriman, Annabel (24 November 1979b). "The Flecks of Green that Tripped up a Bomber". The Times. p. 14.
- "India Orders Mourning For Slain British Hero". The New York Times. 28 August 1979. p. A10.
- "Men Freed on I.R.A. Charges are Rearrested". Evening Herald. 29 August 1979. p. 4.
- Morrow, Ann (7 September 1979). "Lady Brabourne Buried with Grandson". The Daily Telegraph. p. 2.
- Noonan, Laura (18 April 2021). "Sinn Féin Leader Apologises for Mountbatten Assassination". The Financial Times.
- Rais, Guy (30 August 1979). "Blast Yacht to be Rebuilt in Clues Hunt". The Daily Telegraph. p. 2.
- Rorich, Eric (30 August 1979). "Pope will not Visit Ulster". The Daily Telegraph. p. 1.
- Sheridan, Danielle (20 May 2024). "IRA Man Takes Blame for Mountbatten Bomb Blast". The Daily Telegraph. p. 4.
- "Statement by I.R.A." The New York Times. 31 August 1979. p. 6.
- Tew, Kenneth; Glover-James, Ian (5 November 1979). "Sand Grains 'Trapped Lord Louis Bombers'". The Evening Standard. p. 2.
- "The Execution of Soldier Mountbatten". An Phoblacht. 1 September 1979. p. 2.
- "Tito Tribute". The Daily Telegraph. 29 August 1979. p. 1.
- "Two Freed on I.R.A. Charges are Rearrested". Irish Independent. 30 August 1979. p. 9.
- "Two Men Held by Police 'Planted Bomb'". The Daily Telegraph. 6 November 1979. p. 3.
- "Warrenpoint Ambush". An Phoblacht. 8 September 1979. p. 9.
- Witherow, Tom (19 May 2024). "Call to Prosecute IRA Man who Made Bomb that Killed Mountbatten". The Sunday Times. p. 4.

==== Websites ====
- "Admiral Sir Tony Radakin KCB ADC". UK Government.
- "CAIN: FAQ". CAIN Archive. Ulster University. Archived from the original on 6 December 2010.
- Charlton, Linda (24 September 1979). "Fund-Raising by a Group in U.S. Called Vital to I.R.A. Operations". The New York Times. p. 1.
- Clark, Gregory (2023). "The Annual RPI and Average Earnings for Britain, 1209 to Present (New Series)". MeasuringWorth. Archived from the original on 1 April 2023.
- Fitzduff, Mari; O'Hagan, Liam (2009). "The Northern Ireland Troubles: INCORE Background Paper". CAIN Archive. Ulster University. Archived from the original on 9 July 2024.
- "MT letter to President-Elect Shagari of Nigeria". Margaret Thatcher Foundation.
- "New First Sea Lord Officially Takes up Role After Ceremony on HMS Victory". Royal Navy.
- "Prime Minister Botha of South Africa letter to MT". Margaret Thatcher Foundation.
- "Prime Minister Chomanan of Thailand letter to MT". Margaret Thatcher Foundation.
- "Prime Minister Cossiga of Italy letter to MT". Margaret Thatcher Foundation.
- "Prime Minister Marcos of the Philippines letter to MT". Margaret Thatcher Foundation.
- "Prime Minister Muldoon of New Zealand letter to MT". Margaret Thatcher Foundation.
- "Prime Minister Nordli of Norway letter to MT". Margaret Thatcher Foundation.
- "Prime Minister Werner of Luxembourg letter to MT". Margaret Thatcher Foundation.
- "Schmidt message to MT". Margaret Thatcher Foundation.
- "Special Criminal Court". Citizens Information. Archived from the original on 29 April 2025.
- "Taoiseach John Lynch message to MT" (PDF). Margaret Thatcher Foundation.
- "The State Funeral Gun Carriage". Naval Historical Society of Australia. 19 March 1981. Archived from the original on 12 September 2022.
- Ziegler, Philip (6 January 2011). "Mountbatten, Louis Francis Albert Victor Nicholas, first Earl Mountbatten of Burma". Oxford Dictionary of National Biography (online ed.). Oxford University Press. doi:10.1093/ref:odnb/31480. (Subscription, Wikipedia Library access or UK public library membership required.)
