= Gary D. Rawnsley =

British political scientist

Gary D. Rawnsley FRSA
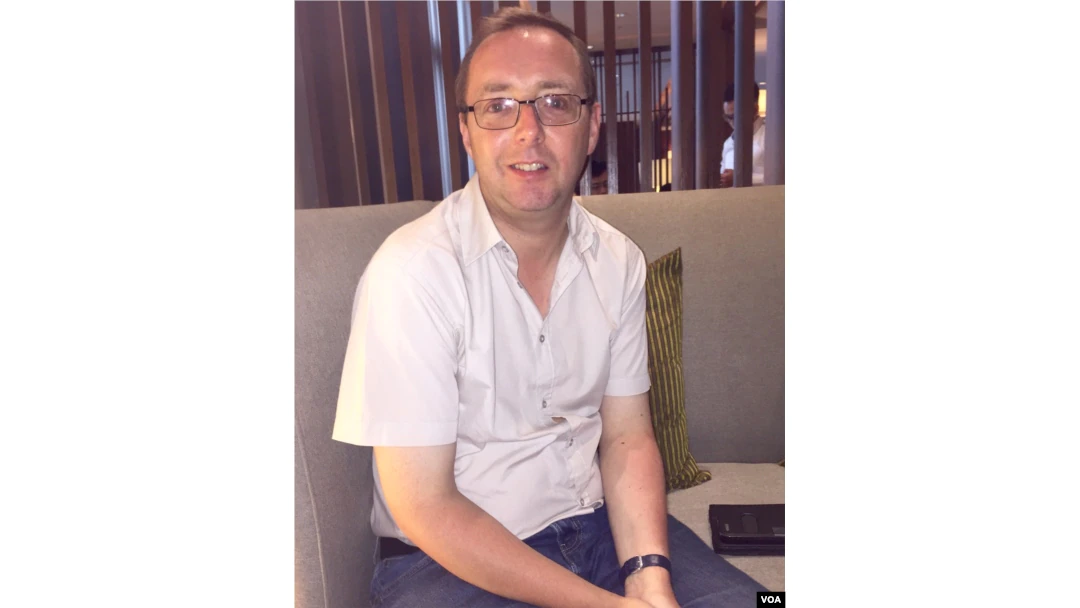
- Rawnsley in 2016
- Born: Gary David Rawnsley; 1970 (age 55–56); Bradford, Yorkshire, England
- Spouse: Ming-Yeh Rawnsley

Academic background
- Education: University of Leeds
- Thesis: Nation Unto Nation: The BBC and VOA in International Politics, 1956-64 (1994)

Academic work
- Discipline: political science
- Sub-discipline: Political communication; International relations
- Main interests: Public diplomacy; Soft power

Gary David Rawnsley (born 1970) is a British political scientist whose research is located at the intersection of international relations and international communication. Rawnsley writes extensively on soft power, public and cultural diplomacy, propaganda, international broadcasting, media and democracy, and political cinema. He is the author/editor of 13 scholarly books, and the book review editor of Journal of International Communication and International Journal of Taiwan Studies. Since 2023, he has been Professor of Public Diplomacy & Soft Power and Head of the School of Social & Political Sciences, University of Lincoln. From 2020 to 2022, Rawnsley was a professor of public diplomacy at the University of Nottingham Ningbo China (UNNC), and Dean of the Faculty of Humanities and Social Sciences (FHSS) of this university.

== Biography ==
=== Early life ===
Rawsley is from Bradford, Yorkshire. In the early 1980s, when he was a teenager, Rawnsley began his career in public diplomacy, writing regularly for Shortwave Magazine. According to a BBC story, his father was a long distance truck driver who would regularly get up at 03:00 and 04:00 to start work. During school holidays, he would go with his father. In 1984, he started to listen to the BBC World Service in his father’s truck. In 1986, his parents bought him a Vega Selena 215 Russian shortwave receiver. He studied comparative politics and international relations in college and used shortwave radio receiver to follow world events. His keen interest in radio led him to study the relevance of international broadcasting to international politics during his doctoral studies.

=== Academic career ===
After graduating from the University of Leeds with a PhD in International Relations/International Communications in 1993, Rawnsley taught for 12 years in the School of Politics at the University of Nottingham, England. From 2005 to 2007, Rawnsley was the founding dean of FHSS, the first professor and head of International Studies, UNNC. After a two-year-secondment to UNNC, Rawnsley became a professor of international communication and the head of the Institute of Communications Studies at the University of Leeds. In 2013, he joined Aberystwyth University as a professor of public diplomacy in the Department of International Politics.

== Publications ==
=== Monographs ===
- Political Communication and Democracy (Palgrave Macmillan, 2005)
- Taiwan's Informal Diplomacy and Propaganda (Palgrave Macmillan, 2000)
- Radio Diplomacy and Propaganda: The BBC and VOA in International Politics, 1956–64 (Palgrave Macmillan, 1996)

=== Single-edited books ===
- Cold-War Propaganda in the 1950s (Springer, 2016)

=== Co-edited volumes ===
- Research Handbook on Political Propaganda. (Edward Elgar Publishing, 2021) with Yiben Ma and Kruakae Pothong
- Transnational Sites of China’s Cultural Diplomacy: Central Asia, Southeast Asia, Middle East and Europe Compared (Palgrave Macmillan, 2020) with Jarmila Ptáčková and Ondřej Klimeš
- Taiwan Cinema: International Reception and Social Change (Routledge, 2019) with Kuei-fen Chiu and Ming-Yeh Rawnsley
- Critical Security, democratisation and television in Taiwan (Taylor & Francis, 2018) with Ming-Yeh Rawnsley
- The Routledge Handbook of Soft Power (Routledge, 2016) with Naren Chitty, Lilian Ji, and Craig Hayden
- Routledge Handbook of Chinese Media (Routledge, 2015) with Ming-Yeh Rawnsley
- Global Chinese Cinema: The Culture and Politics of 'Hero' (Routledge, 2011) with Ming-Yeh Rawnsley
- Political Communications in Greater China: The Construction and Reflection of Identity (Routledge, 2003) with Ming-Yeh Rawnsley
- The Clandestine Cold War in Asia, 1945-65: Western Intelligence, Propaganda and Special Operations (Taylor & Francis, 2000) with Richard J. Aldrich and Ming-Yeh Rawnsley
