= Death of Yasser Arafat =

2004 death of the Palestinian president

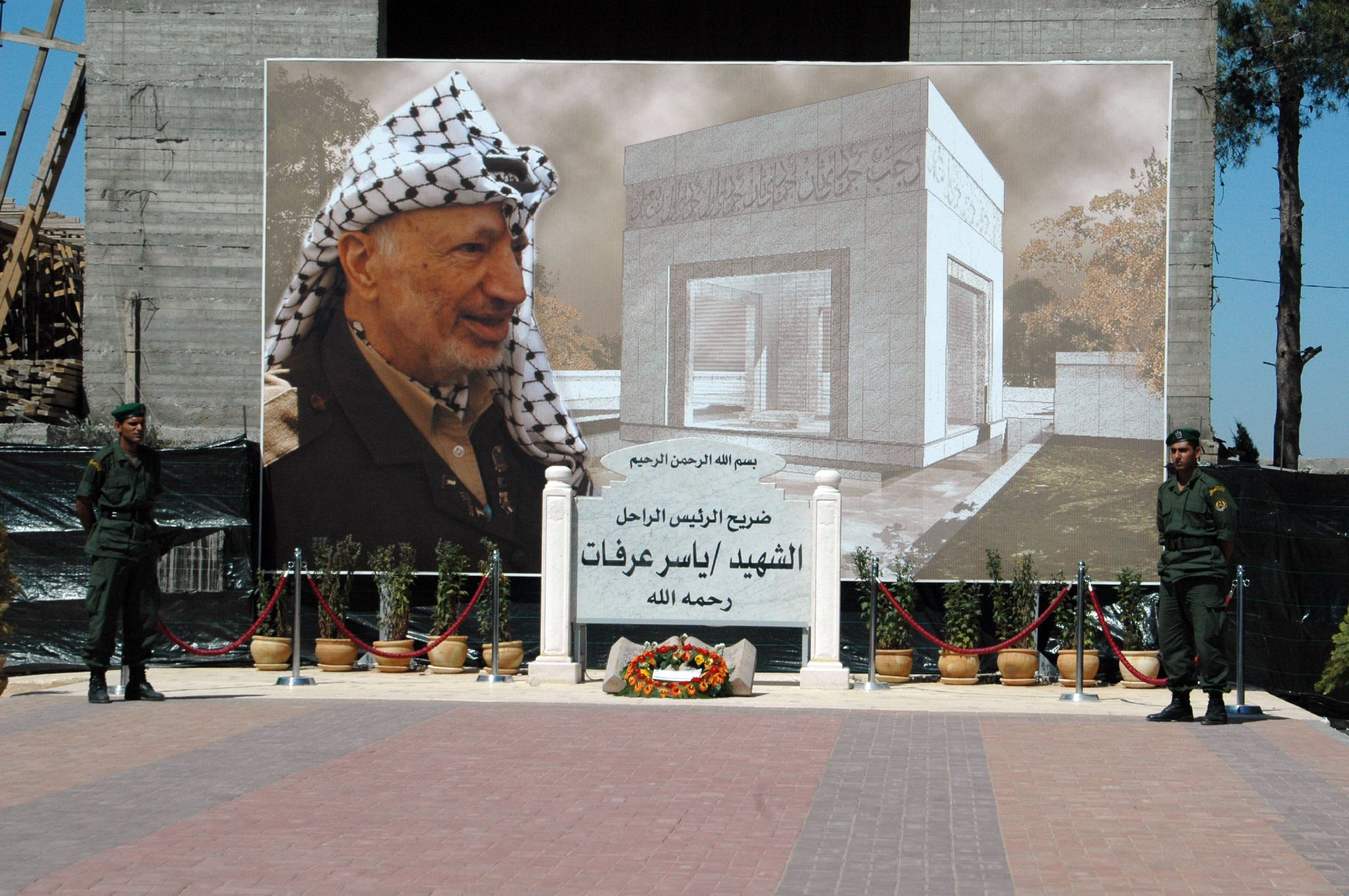
- Mausoleum of Arafat in Ramallah
- Date: 11 November 2004
- Location: Hôpital d'instruction des armées Percy in Clamart, a suburb of Paris, France
- Outcome: Yasser Arafat's body buried in the Mukaata, which was his compound in Ramallah.

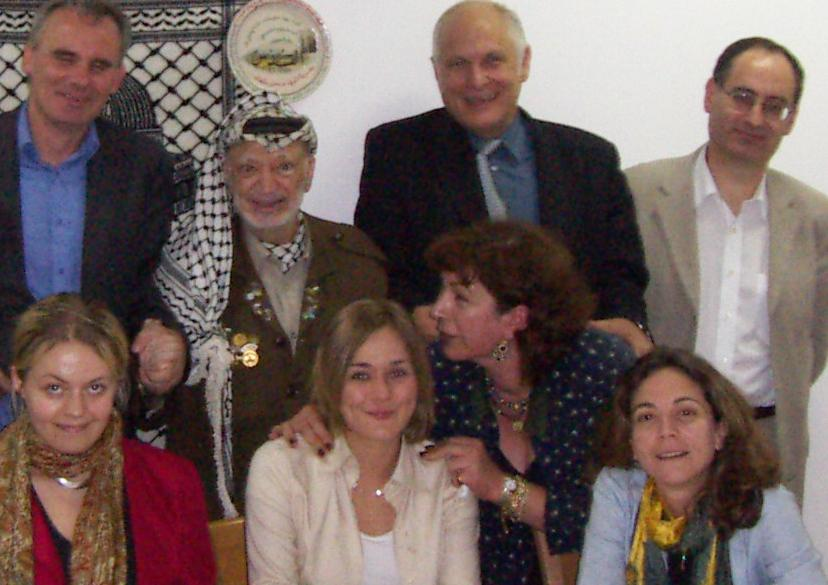
Yasser Arafat, November 2004, shortly before his death

Yasser Arafat, who was the President of the Palestinian National Authority and Chairman of the Palestine Liberation Organization, died unexpectedly on 11 November 2004, at the age of 75, after a short period of illness. The cause of his death has since been debated, and several different theories concerning it have been suggested. However, official investigations by French and Russian teams did not find evidence of foul play.

== History of illness ==
Arafat's illness began on 12 October 2004 with nausea, vomiting, abdominal pain, and diarrhea. Soon afterward, his general health deteriorated. Following visits by other doctors, including teams from Tunisia, Jordan, and Egypt, Arafat was taken to France on a French government jet, and was admitted to the Hôpital d'instruction des armées Percy in Clamart, a suburb of Paris, on 29 October 2004. On admission, he was experiencing diarrhea, nausea, vomiting, and generalised abdominal pain, along with mild liver and kidney failure linked to disseminated intravascular coagulation. His condition deteriorated with acute renal failure, and, on 3 November, he lapsed into a gradually deepening coma.

A controversy erupted between officials of the PNA and Suha Arafat, Arafat's wife, when officials from the PNA traveled to France to see Arafat. French law forbids physicians from discussing the condition of their patients with anybody, with the exception, in the case of a grave prognosis, of close relatives. Accordingly, all communications concerning Arafat's health had to be authorized by his wife. Palestinian officials expressed regret that the news about Yasser Arafat was "filtered" by her.

The next day, chief surgeon Christian Estripeau of Percy reported that Arafat's condition had worsened, and that he had fallen into a deeper coma. Sheikh Taissir Tamimi, the head of the Islamic court of the Palestinian territories, who held a vigil at Arafat's bedside, visited Arafat, and declared that it was out of the question to disconnect him from life support, since, according to him, such an action is prohibited in Islam.

== Death ==
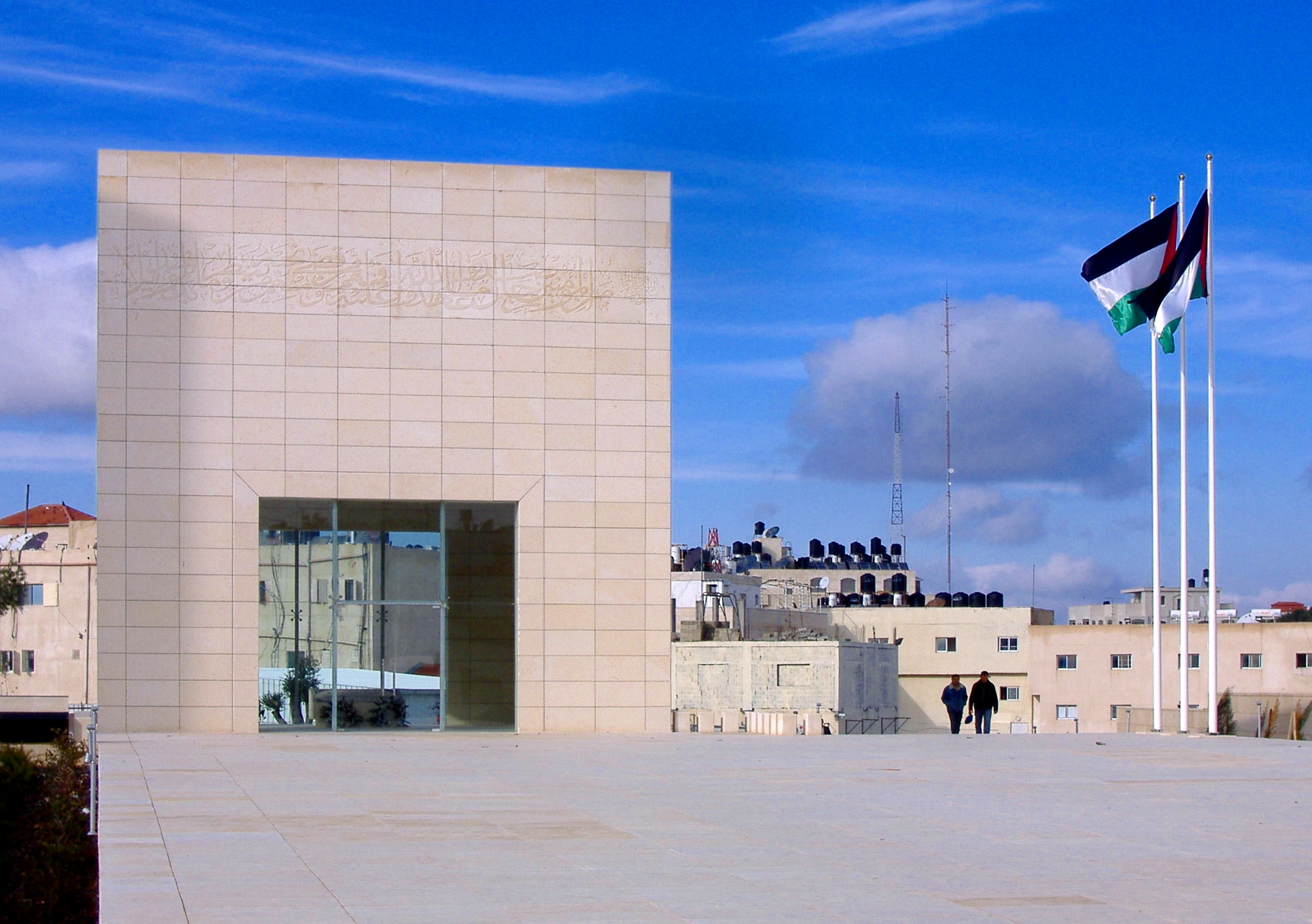
Arafat mausoleum

Arafat was pronounced dead on 11 November 2004 at 03:30 UTC at the age of 75 of what French doctors called a massive haemorrhagic cerebrovascular accident. However, the underlying infection was declared unknown. The official statement announcing his death failed to determine a cause, saying only that he had a "mystery blood disorder".

The Canard Enchaîné newspaper reported alleged leaks of information by unnamed medical sources at Percy hospital that had access to Arafat and his medical file. According to the newspaper, the doctors at Percy hospital suspected, from Arafat's arrival, grave lesions of the liver responsible for an alteration of the composition of the blood; Arafat was therefore placed in a hematology service. Leukemia was "soundly ruled out". According to the same source, the reason why this diagnosis of cirrhosis could not be made available was that, in the mind of the general public, cirrhosis is generally associated with the consequences of alcohol abuse. Even though the diagnosis was not of alcoholic cirrhosis and Arafat was not known for consuming any alcohol, there was a likelihood of rumors. The source explained that Arafat's living conditions did little to improve the situation. Thus, according to the source, the probable causes of the disease were multiple; Arafat's coma was a consequence of the worsened cirrhosis. The French newspaper Le Monde quoted doctors as saying that he had "an unusual blood disease and a liver problem".

After Arafat's death, the French Ministry of Defence said that Arafat's medical file would be transmitted to only his next of kin. It was determined that Arafat's nephew and PNA envoy to the UN, Nasser al-Qudwa, was a close enough relative, thus working around Suha Arafat's silence on her husband's illness. Nasser al-Qudwa was given a copy of Arafat's 558-page medical file by the French Ministry of Defence.

== Theories about the cause of death ==
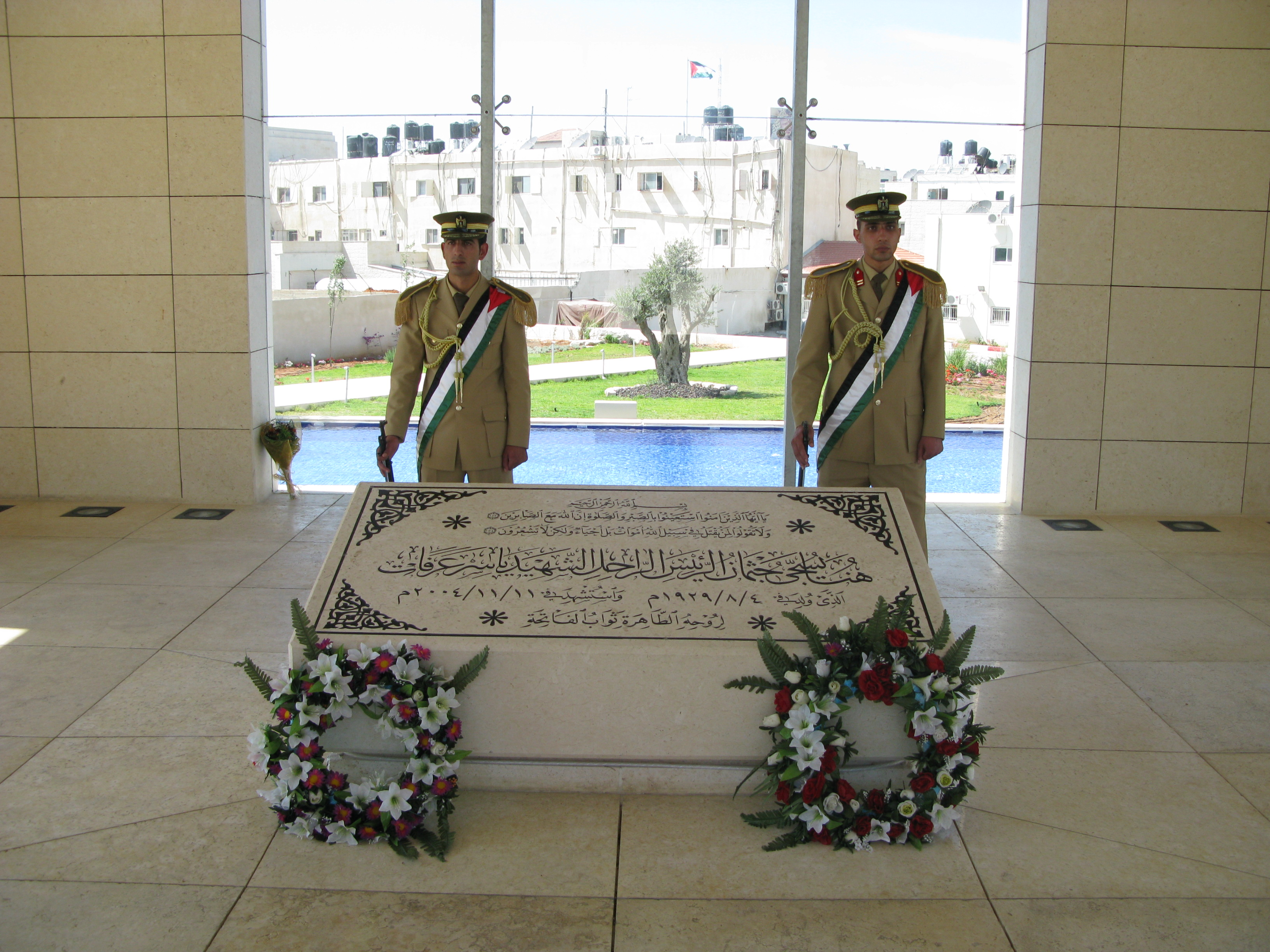
Palestinian honor guard stationed at Arafat's temporary tomb in Ramallah

There are numerous theories about the cause of Arafat's death. Initially Arafat's records were withheld by senior Palestinian officials. In 2004, Palestinian Foreign Minister Nabil Shaath said after talks with Arafat's French doctors that they had "ruled out poison completely". However, Shaath stated in "The Price of Kings", a documentary on Arafat's leadership, "I have no doubt that he was assassinated. The French said that whatever toxic material was in his body did not test positive in their toxicology table, saying in plain words 'this was a poison we did not have in our laboratories.'"

Al-Kurdi, Arafat's personal physician for 18 years, said "I would usually be summoned to attend to Arafat immediately, even when all he had was a simple cold ... But when his medical situation was really deteriorating, they chose not to call me at all", and Arafat's wife, Suha, refused to allow him to visit Arafat in the private Paris hospital where he was being treated. Later he was denied access to Arafat's body after his death.

Al-Kurdi also lamented that Arafat's widow Suha had refused an autopsy, which he said would have answered many questions regarding cause of death.

Medical records released in 2005 showed that Arafat's doctors could not agree on the cause of death, stating that he died from a stroke that stemmed from an unknown condition. Analysis based on those records suggested him dying from poisoning, AIDS, or an infection. In 2012, newly released medical records revealed that French doctors initially diagnosed Arafat with gastroenteritis.

=== Poisoning ===
In 2004, Palestinian Foreign Minister Nabil Shaath said after talks with Arafat's French doctors that they had "ruled out poison completely". A 2005 article in The New York Times said that based on his records it was highly unlikely that Arafat died from poisoning. Meanwhile, al-Kurdi called for the creation of an independent commission to carry out investigations concerning Arafat's suspicious death, stating, "any doctor would tell you that these are the symptoms of a poisoning".

Former Knesset member, peace activist and personal friend of Arafat Uri Avnery claimed at the time of Arafat's death that he had been poisoned, and repeated the claim in 2012. Another "senior Israeli physician" claimed in an article in Haaretz that it was "a classic case of food poisoning", probably caused by a meal eaten four hours before he fell ill that may have contained a toxin such as ricin, rather than a standard bacterial poisoning. However, in the same week as the report in Haaretz, The New York Times published a separate report, also based on access to Arafat's medical records, which claimed that it was highly unlikely that Arafat had food poisoning.

==== Poisoning with polonium ====
According to Israel Radio, a former Palestinian intelligence officer, attorney Fahmi Shabana, said that Yasser Arafat's political rivals were responsible for his death, and that he was poisoned with polonium. Shabana, who took part in the investigation into Arafat's death in a French hospital in 2004, also said that several months after his death, the same cell murdered the head of military intelligence in Gaza, General Moussa Arafat, a relative of the PLO leader, in order to prevent a blood feud. The lawyer called on Palestinian Authority president Mahmoud Abbas to reopen the investigation into Arafat's death."

==== Al Jazeera's investigation ====
On 4 July 2012, Al Jazeera reported that a nine-month investigation by Al Jazeera had revealed that none of the causes of Arafat's death suggested in several rumors were true, as Arafat was in good health until he suddenly fell ill on 12 October 2004. Tests carried out by the Institut de Radiophysique (Institute of Radiation Physics) at the University of Lausanne in Switzerland found traces of polonium, a rare, highly radioactive element, on Arafat's personal belongings, including his toothbrush, hat, surgical bouffant (headgear), and underwear, which suggested that there was a high level of polonium inside his body when he died. The investigation ruled out HIV or any other infectious disease as a cause of death. The polonium was found in quantities much higher than could occur naturally, and further, that 60%–80% of that polonium (depending on the item being tested) had not come from natural sources, but from a nuclear reactor. The quantities found on his personal items at the time of this investigation were generally consistent with quantities of polonium that would have been given to poison him when he suddenly first came down with major symptoms of illness.

In October 2010, an official press release from the Institut de Radiophysique, where those items were analyzed, had stated that:

"an unexplained quantity of Polonium-210 has been detected on the personal effects of Mr. Arafat. However, this is not sufficient to determine the causes of death. In particular, it will be recalled that, contrary to what happened in the case of the former Russian spy Alexander Litvinenko, Mr. Arafat did not lose his hair, and some of the findings in the forensic report are inconsistent with an acute radiation syndrome."

In July 2012, a spokesman for the Institut de Radiophysique stressed that the "clinical symptoms described in Arafat's medical reports were not consistent with polonium-210 and that conclusions could not be drawn as to whether the Palestinian leader was poisoned or not", and that "the only way to confirm the findings would be to exhume Arafat's body to test it for polonium-210". François Bochud, who heads the Institute of Radiation Physics in Lausanne, Switzerland, stated that "our results are clearly not a proof of any poisoning". Alastair Hay, professor of environmental toxicology at the University of Leeds in England, stated: "You don't know much about the provenance of the clothing and whether it had been tampered with later on. You'd want to test the body."

In response to Al Jazeera's report, Dr Ely Karmon, at Herzliya's Institute for Counterterrorism, a specialist in chemical, biological, radiological and nuclear terrorism, said that "the half-life of the substance [i.e., slightly more than 138 days 9 hours] would make it impossible for polonium to have been discovered at such high levels if it had been used to kill Arafat eight years ago. If it had been used for poisoning, minimal levels should be seen now. Yet much higher levels were found. Someone planted the polonium much later." He went on to question why Arafat's widow, Suha Arafat, who provided the researchers with Arafat's belongings was not also poisoned while she was by his side at the hospital touching him and his clothing.

Israel has denied any connection to the rumours. Deputy Spokesman of Israeli Foreign Ministry Paul Hirschson was skeptical of the rumours, joking, "All of a sudden, Suha's checking her wash basket and discovered clothes that weren't washed for eight years. Suddenly, out of nowhere a couple of garments turn up; we test them, and presto! There's Polonium." Avi Dichter, who was in charge of the Shin Bet when Arafat died, told Army radio that "Yasser Arafat had many enemies, domestically, abroad. But let them investigate. ... The Palestinians know well how to investigate what goes on in their house. Let them investigate and find out."

On 12 October 2013, the British medical journal The Lancet published a peer-reviewed article titled "Improving forensic investigation for polonium poisoning". In the article, a group of Swiss doctors suggested that Arafat could have died of polonium poisoning. The team analysed 38 samples of Arafat's clothes and belongings and 37 reference samples which were known to be polonium-free. Several of the Arafat samples were notably more radioactive than the controls, but not all. The team believed that an autopsy could be useful in this case. After testing Arafat's personal belongings and samples of his body fluids, the chief of the Federal Medical-Biological Agency of Russia, Vladimir Uyba, concluded that polonium was not the cause of his death, but the Agency then denied that Uyba's comments were official. British forensic scientist Professor David Barclay said the Swiss team's findings were a "smoking gun", and that it was "absolutely certain" that polonium had been the cause of his death. After the results of the French and Russian tests became public, David Barclay did not comment or communicate any more on the case.

The French tests found some polonium but stated it was from "natural environmental origin". Later the Russian tests released in December 2013 found that Arafat's death was not caused by radiation. Vladimir Uyba, the head of the Russian Federal Medical and Biological Agency, stated that Yasser had died of natural causes and they had no plans to conduct further tests.

=== Gastroenteritis ===
New medical records that were released in July 2012 showed that Arafat's condition was initially diagnosed as viral gastroenteritis by his Arab doctors who took care of him in the West Bank in the Mukataa before he was airlifted to France, although his condition later improved and he even joined in the fast of Ramadan. However, there was persistent vomiting and diarrhea, Arafat began feeling weaker, and his blood platelet count dropped. On 28 October, his medical team decided to send him abroad, and he was flown to France the next morning.

Dr Joseph Zimmerman, an Israeli specialist who reviewed the Ramallah medical file said Arafat's early symptoms were not consistent with viral gastroenteritis, and did not believe that type of viral infection would lead to death. He also said that poisoning appeared unlikely, even by a radioactive substance such as polonium-210. He reminded people that Arafat's platelet counts dropped suddenly and stayed low, and that Arafat eventually exhibited signs of liver dysfunction, which could have been caused by a bacterial infection, but is not typical of poisoning.

=== Platelet disorder ===
A report by the French doctors who treated him states that a platelet disorder caused Arafat's death. The cause of this platelet disorder is unknown, although poison is a possibility.

=== AIDS ===
In September 2005, based on obtained Arafat records, an Israeli AIDS expert claimed that Arafat bore all the symptoms of AIDS, while The New York Times claimed it was highly unlikely that Arafat died from AIDS. John Loftus reported on ABC radio that Arafat had died of AIDS. According to Loftus, the CIA had knowledge of his condition, and convinced Israel not to assassinate him and wait for his inevitable death of the disease, since the subsequent widespread connotations of the disease with homosexuality would discredit him. Arafat's personal doctor for 18 years, Dr. Ashraf Al-Kurdi, said there was HIV in his blood, but poison killed him, and al-Kurdi, a former Jordanian official said the virus had been injected into Arafat's bloodstream.

However an article published in a number of American news publications rejected the assertion that Arafat had AIDS, stating, "An Israeli infectious disease specialist said he would have performed the test, if only to be thorough and to refute the rumors that surrounded the case. He said news accounts during Arafat's illness made him strongly suspect that Arafat had AIDS. But after studying the records, he said that was improbable, given the sudden onset of the intestinal troubles", though AIDS-associated opportunistic infections such as cryptosporidiosis can begin in this way. This same article also states that it is "highly unlikely" that Arafat had died from poisoning, and further asserts that Arafat had died from a stroke linked to an "underlying infection."

==== Call for new investigation ====
Following Al Jazeera's investigation, Suha Arafat called for the exhumation of Arafat's body for further testing. In response, Abbas ordered a committee to be formed, and stated that there were no religious or political obstacles to exhuming the body. However, Nimr Hamad, an aide to Abbas, stated that a team of experts would first be sent to Europe to learn more from the Swiss institute and from the French military hospital where Arafat died. Abbas stated that he would only order an autopsy if the family agreed, but did not define whom in the family he meant. Later, Abbas stated that they would only investigate "if necessary". Tawfiq Tirawi, the head of the committee in charge of investigating Arafat's death, stated: "We are certain that there are Palestinian hands that contributed to the elimination of Yasser Arafat." With regards to those people, Tirawi stated that they "will be subject to severe penalties and doomed to death". On 30 July 2012, Tirawi added, "We haven't initiated the investigation based on the hypothesis that Arafat was killed by poison, but we agreed to begin an investigation searching directly for the killer regardless of the medical reports which will eventually show the method of killing and name of the toxin."

Tunisia also requested that the Arab League convene a ministerial meeting to discuss Arafat's death and study the circumstances in which he died.

Arab League Secretary-General Nabil Elaraby stated that a permanent representative meeting would be held to discuss Arafat's death, and that permanent representatives would prepare a report and raise proposals over necessary action, which they would present in the soonest Arab League ministerial meeting.

== Exhumation of Arafat's remains ==
On 9 July 2012, Palestinian Authority President Mahmoud Abbas approved the exhumation of Arafat's body in response to the Al Jazeera story about polonium. On 8 August 2012, Swiss experts were invited to the West Bank to prepare for the examination of Yasser Arafat's remains to investigate possible poisoning. The lab said that they wanted guarantees that the investigation would not be used for political purposes, saying, "Meanwhile, our main concern is to guarantee the independence, the credibility and the transparency of any involvement that we may have." On 27 November 2012, three teams of international investigators collected samples from Arafat's body and the surrounding soil in the mausoleum in Ramallah. A French, a Swiss and a Russian team independently investigated the samples.

Publication of the results of the studies was delayed, reportedly on the request of the Palestinian Authority, which feared they could have negative impact on the peace talks.

On 6 November 2013, Al Jazeera reported that the Swiss forensic team had found levels of polonium in Arafat's ribs and pelvis 18 times higher than normal, and were 83% confident that polonium poisoning had occurred, but Professor Bochud disagreed with this interpretation by Al Jazeera and only stated that the poisoning hypothesis by polonium was "moderately supported".

According to a journalist from the Swiss daily newspaper Le Temps, Luis Lema, the Swiss experts had concluded that on a probability scale ranging from one to six, death by polonium poisoning was around five.

Suha Arafat stated her belief that he was a victim of a "political assassination" but refrained from finger-pointing and said she would await the French forensic results.

Joods Actueel, a Belgian monthly newspaper, claimed that most experts in forensics disagreed that the results were consistent with polonium poisoning and that the conclusions of the Swiss study were not in line with the results obtained.

Forensic biologist Nathan Lents of the John Jay College of Criminal Justice said the report's results were consistent with a possible polonium poisoning, but "There's certainly not a smoking gun here."

Derek Hill, a professor in radiological science at University College London who was not involved in the investigation, said: "I would say it's clearly not overwhelming proof, and there is a risk of contamination (of the samples), but it is a pretty strong signal ... It seems likely what they're doing is putting a very cautious interpretation of strong data."

After the testing of Arafat's remains by the Russian team, the Russian Medical-Biological Agency concluded that polonium was not the cause of his death. However, the government scientific body later denied that it had made any official statement about the research, saying only that it had handed its results to the Russian Foreign Ministry. However, Al Jazeera found that the Russian scientists had only investigated four out of 20 samples, being the samples that were unlikely to show the amount of radioactive exposure. The scientists also appear to have been restricted by the Russian Foreign Ministry in how to present the report. According to Al Jazeera's source, "Russia's goal was to fulfill the Palestinian Authority's request, not offend Israel by helping the PA, and not create a new hotbed in the Middle East".

In December 2013, an unidentified person leaked what were claimed to be the results of the French investigation to AFP, saying that "the report rules out the poisoning theory and goes in the sense of a natural death". According to the leaker, the report says Arafat died of a "generalised infection". On 4 December, Al Jazeera quoted Suha Arafat speaking at a press conference after having received the French report: "Is it the poisoned body that would have contaminated the environment outside? Or is it the opposite? The first one is the conclusion of the Swiss. The Swiss think that the body was poisoned and contaminated the environment. And the French reach the opposite conclusion—that it's actually the environment outside which explains the presence of polonium 210." Later that same month, a Russian investigative team from the Federal Medico-Biological Agency agreed that Arafat did not die from poisoning.

Unlike the Swiss report, the French and Russian reports were not made public, at the time. The French later announced that foul play was not involved.

The CHUV published in February 2016 a paper in Science Direct to justify their conclusions. They said: "The evidences gathered during this expert report are not clear-cut: we cannot exclude ^{210}Po as a cause of death, but we cannot be sure that ^{210}Po was the cause of death."

In another document the CHUV explains "these results do not then define the probability to which Yasser Arafat would have been poisoned by polonium, but must be integrated into the larger context of the police and legal investigations in connection to this case, and which are beyond our field of expertise".

In July 2016, Joods Actueel published an updated document wherein it stated that their previous analysis was confirmed by CHUV. According to them, the conclusions that are based only on Bayesian analysis are not valid as they are not documented with figures. It also invoked errors based on such examples as the investigation into the case of Sally Clark.

== Murder inquiry ==
After Al Jazeera's presentation in July 2012 of the results of its nine-month investigation, Arafat's widow Suha Arafat declared her intention to launch a court case in France into the death of her husband. Suha Arafat told Al Jazeera that she had long suspected that her husband was murdered, noting that both Israel and the United States regarded him as an obstacle to peace.

On 31 July 2012, Suha Arafat and her daughter Zahwa lodged a murder complaint in the Paris western suburb of Nanterre. On 28 August, French prosecutors opened a murder inquiry. In March 2015, a French prosecutor announced that Arafat's death was from natural causes, and found that the polonium 210 and lead 210 discovered in Arafat's grave were of an environmental nature.

Later, a French investigation by three judges unanimously concluded that "it has not been demonstrated that Mr Yasser Arafat was murdered by polonium-210 poisoning" and that the investigation should be dropped.

At the end of June 2016, a French Court of Appeal confirmed the previous conclusions.

== Allegation of killing of Arafat by Israel ==
The Israeli government tried for decades to assassinate Arafat, including attempting to intercept and shoot down private aircraft and commercial airliners on which he was believed to be traveling. The assassination was initially assigned to Caesarea, the Mossad unit in charge of Israel's targeted killings. Shooting down a commercial airliner in international airspace over very deep water was thought to be preferable to make recovery of the wreckage, and hence investigation, more difficult. Following Israel's 1982 invasion of Lebanon, Israeli Minister of Defense Ariel Sharon created a special task force code named "Salt Fish" headed by special operations experts Meir Dagan and Rafi Eitan to track Arafat's movements in Lebanon to kill him because Sharon still saw Arafat as an important symbol. The Salt Fish task force orchestrated the bombing of buildings where Arafat and senior PLO leaders were believed to be staying. Later renamed "Operation Goldfish", Israeli operatives followed Israeli journalist Uri Avnery to a meeting with Arafat in an additional unsuccessful attempt to eliminate him. In 2001, Sharon, as prime minister, is believed to have made a commitment to cease attempts to assassinate Arafat. However, following Israel's successful assassination in March 2004 of Sheikh Ahmed Yassin, a founder of the Hamas movement, in April 2004 Sharon stated that "this commitment of mine no longer exists."

On September 11, 2003, the Security Cabinet of Israel decided that "Israel will act to remove this obstacle [Arafat] in the manner, at the time, and in the ways that will be decided on separately". Israeli Cabinet members and officials hinted on Arafat's death.

Journalist Danny Rubinstein states that Sharon's inner circle constantly discussed how to get rid of Arafat months and weeks before his death. Israeli peace activist and former Knesset member, Uri Avnery, a personal friend of Arafat, blamed Sharon for Arafat's death. Palestinian official and nephew of Arafat Nasser al-Qudwa said that the report of the committee that investigated the death of late Palestinian President Yasser Arafat revealed that the leader was poisoned to death, and that Israel is directly responsible for his assassination. He said "Israel as a state, is a country that has access to Polonium, had the capability to assassinate the late leader, and expressed clear interest in getting rid of him".

On 11 September 2003, the Israeli security Cabinet decided to "remove" Arafat. In a statement it said "Recent days' events have proven again that Yasser Arafat is a complete obstacle to any process of reconciliation ... Israel will act to remove this obstacle in the manner, at the time, and in the ways that will be decided on separately..." Sharon refused to give a timetable for his removal, because "It depends on what happens on the ground ... Arafat is responsible for the killing of hundreds, if not thousands, of Jews ... The sword is hanging over his head, and this is a good thing". Chief of Staff Moshe Ya'alon and other Israeli officials declared that the Palestinian leader should "either be killed or deported". Sharon said that Arafat impeded and undermined the peace process and urged states of the European Union to boycott Arafat. Deputy Prime Minister Ehud Olmert told Israel Radio that killing Arafat "is definitely one of the options" under consideration by the government. A Security Council resolution demanding that Israel desist from deporting Arafat or threatening his safety was vetoed by the United States.

In 2009, Bassam Abu Sharif, Arafat's former advisor, alleged that Mossad, the national intelligence agency of Israel, had poisoned Arafat by a lethal dose of thallium, a rare chemical whose effects are difficult to trace, via Arafat's daily medications. Abu Sharif alleged that the Israel Defense Forces (IDF) had held the driver of a Palestinian ambulance that brought him his medications, for a minimum of 30 minutes while the IDF searched it. According to Abu Sharif, this incident would have allowed Israel to replace Arafat's medications with poison. In his book Arafat and the Dream of Palestine: An Insider's Account, Abu Sharif wrote, "I was positive they were poisoning his food on a daily basis and doing it right under our very eyes."

As a result of Abu Sharif's allegations, the delegates at the August 2009 Fatah convention in Bethlehem voted for a resolution which blamed Israel for poisoning Yasser Arafat. An editorial in The Jerusalem Post questioned the legitimacy of Abu Sharif's allegations, noting that "nobody asked how Abu Sharif came to possess this information, whether he can back it up or why he chose to divulge it so late". A leader of Fatah and a nephew of Arafat said that an investigation indicated a "high possibility of poisoning" but that there was not any proof.

In 2011, Abu Sarif alleged that an investigation conducted by "the most prominent forensic toxicology expert in the UK" had revealed that thallium was responsible for poisoning Arafat. According to Abu Sharif, European toxicology experts are not familiar with thallium and only this forensic toxicology expert could have identified the thallium. However, Abu Sharif did not reveal the names of the expert or the institution responsible for the research.

Israeli officials denied in 2012 any connection with the recent finds. Israeli journalist Yossi Melman, who specializes in espionage stories, reported that, based on his research with Dan Raviv, Israel did not kill Arafat. Melman stated that the IDF had wanted to take harsh action against Arafat, ranging from killing him to expelling him, but Ariel Sharon rejected these ideas, stating that the advantages would not outweigh being accused of killing Arafat, and Arafat already seemed to be an irrelevant leader who was not trusted by the international community.
