= Andrew Mumford =

Andrew Mumford may refer to:

- Andrew Mumford (footballer)
- Andrew Mumford (political scientist)
