= Gunter Schubert (sinologist) =

German Sinologist

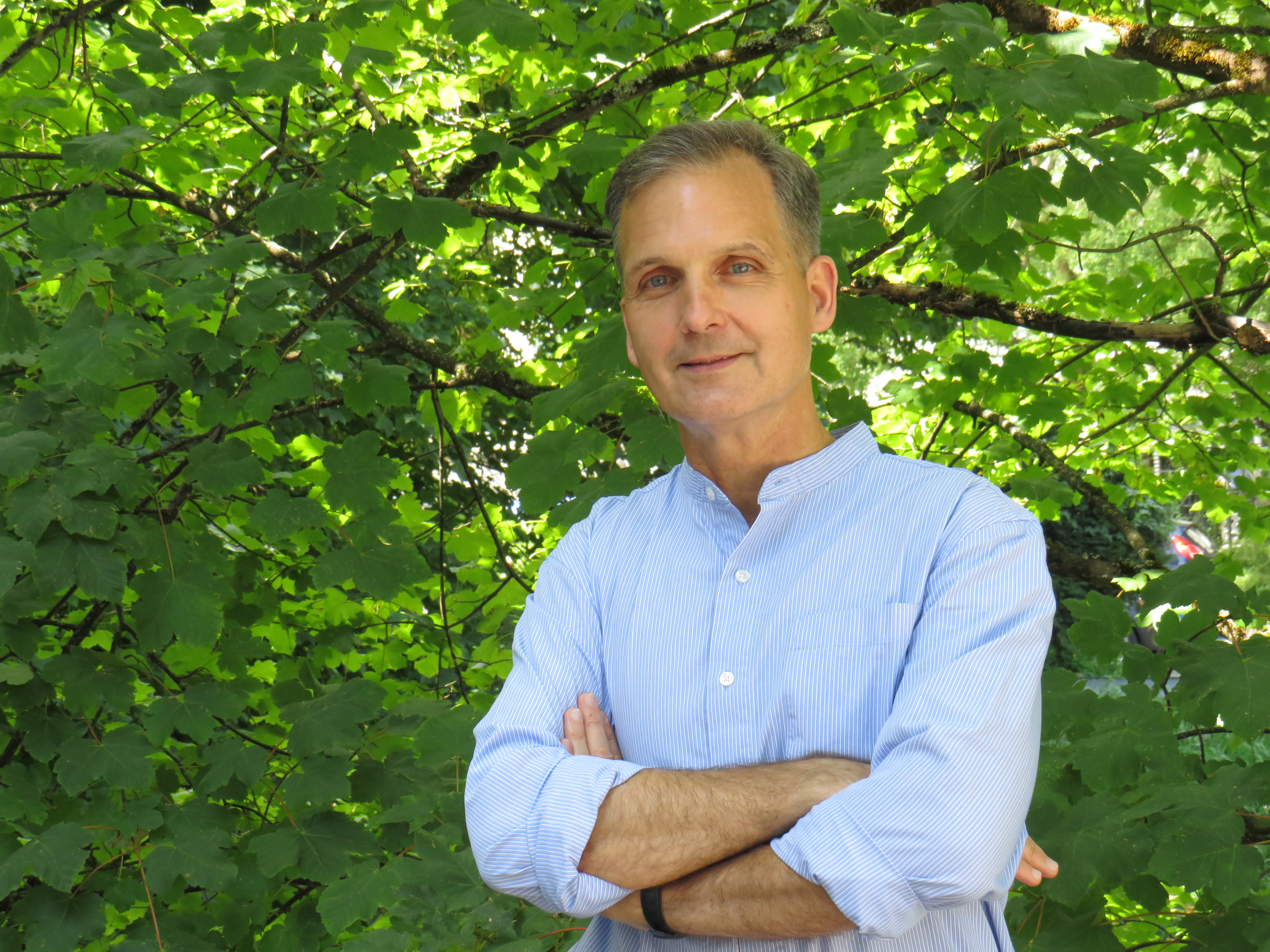
Prof. Dr. Gunter Schubert

Gunter Schubert (born 17 October 1963 in Düsseldorf, Germany) is a German sinologist and political scientist. He is a full professor at the Institute of Asian and Oriental Studies (Department of Sinology) of Eberhard Karls University of Tübingen and founder and director of the European Research Center on Contemporary Taiwan (ERCCT) at the University of Tübingen.

== Biography ==
Schubert studied political science, law, and modern sinology at the Universities of Marburg and Hamburg from 1985 to 1989. From 1990 to 1992, he was a Visiting Fellow at the Institute of International Relations of National Chengchi University in Taipei, Taiwan. Between 1992 and 1994, he worked as a research associate for Africa and democracy scholar Rainer Tetzlaff at the Institute of Political Science at the University of Hamburg. In 1994 he received his doctorate with a dissertation entitled Taiwan – the Chinese Alternative. Democratization in an East Asian Newly Industrializing Country (1986–1993).

From 1994 to 2003, Schubert served as senior research fellow for politics and society in China and East Asia at the Protestant Institute of Interdisciplinary Research (FESt) in Heidelberg, a research institution of the Protestant churches in Germany. During this time, he worked together with theologians, philosophers, natural scientists, and scholars in the humanities, and also taught at the Institute of Political Science at Heidelberg University.

In 2000, Schubert completed his habilitation with a study on nationalist thought in China, Taiwan, and Hong Kong. Alongside his work at FESt, he continued to teach as a private lecturer at Heidelberg University. In 2003, he was appointed to the newly established Chair of Greater China Studies at the University of Tübingen, where he founded the European Research Center on Contemporary Taiwan (ERCCT) in 2008.

== Research interests ==
Schubert's research and teaching focus on politics, economy, and society in contemporary Greater China. Greater China refers to the territorial entities of the People's Republic of China, Taiwan, Hong Kong, Macau and Singapore, as well as Chinese communities in Southeast Asia and beyond Asia.

His current research interests include the implementation of Chinese policies from a governance perspective, relations between private entrepreneurship and the state in China, the political economy of Sino-Taiwanese relations with a focus on Taiwanese entrepreneurs in mainland China, Taiwanese domestic politics, and more recently, Chinese and Taiwanese high-tech policies in the context of the geo-economic paradigm shift in International Relations and International Political Economy.

Schubert publishes in German, English, French, and Chinese and regularly conducts field research in mainland China, Taiwan, and Hong Kong. He was the first social scientist appointed to a sinological institute in Germany, contributing to the opening of German sinology to social science–oriented China scholars. At the University of Tübingen, he also serves as an affiliated professor at the Institute of Political Science.

== Other activities ==
Schubert serves on numerous editorial boards of international academic journals, including the Executive Editorial Board of the International Journal of Taiwan Studies (first published in 2018). He is Associate Editor of Issues & Studies and co-editor of the Springer book series East Asia in the 21st Century: Politics – Society – Security – Regional Integration.

Since 2024, Schubert has been a member of the German-Taiwanese Dialogue Platform (Deutsch Taiwanesische Dialogplattform), a discussion forum established by the foreign ministries of Germany and Taiwan to promote civil society cooperation between the two countries.

== Publications (selected) ==
Monographs

- Kleine Geschichte Taiwans. C. H. Beck, München 2024, ISBN 978-3-406-81392-4.
- Weapons of the Rich: Strategic Action of Private Entrepreneurs in Contemporary China, Singapur: World Scientific, 2021 (with Thomas Heberer).
- Participation and Empowerment at the Grassroots – Chinese Village Elections in Perspective, Lanham: Rowman & Littlefield, 2012 (with Anna L. Ahlers).
- Die Politik (with Alexander Ular), Marburg: Metropolis-Verlag, 2009.
- Politische Partizipation und Regimelegitimität in der VR China. Band II: Der ländliche Raum, Wiesbaden: VS-Verlag für Sozialwissenschaften, 2009 (with Thomas Heberer).
- 从群众到公民 – 中国的政治参与 (Von Massen zu Bürgern. Politische Partizipation in der VR China), Beijing: Central Compilation & Translation Press, 2009 (Chinesische Übersetzung von Politische Partizipation und Regimelegitimität in der VR China, Bd. 1: Der urbane Raum, gemeinsam mit Thomas Heberer).
- Politische Partizipation und Regimelegitimität in der VR China. Band I: Der urbane Raum, Wiesbaden: VS-Verlag für Sozialwissenschaften, Wiesbaden 2008 (with Thomas Heberer).
- Der Kampf um die Nation – Dimensionen nationalistischen Denkens in der Volksrepublik China, Taiwan und Hongkong an der Jahrtausendwende, Hamburg: Institut für Asienkunde, 2002 (Habilitation).
- Taiwan – die chinesische Alternative. Demokratisierung in einem ostasiatischen Schwellenland, Hamburg: Institut für Asienkunde, Hamburg 1994 (Dissertation).

Edited volumes

- Routledge Handbook of Contemporary Taiwan. 2 Auflage. Abingdon-New York: Routledge 2025.
- Die politischen Systeme Ostasiens. Eine Einführung (with Claudia Derichs and Thomas Heberer), Wiesbaden: Springer, 2023.
- Taiwan During the First Administration of Tsai Ing-Wen: Navigating Stormy Waters (with Lee Chun-Yi), Abingdon-New York: Routledge, 2022.
- Immigration Governance in East Asia. Norm Diffusion, Politics of Identity, Citizenship (with Franziska Plümmer and Anastasiya Bayok), Abingdon-New York: Routledge, 2021.
- Assessing the Presidency of Ma Ying-jiu in Taiwan. Hopeful Beginning, Hopeless End?, London-New York: Routledge, 2018 (with André Beckershoff)
- The Taiwan Handbook on Contemporary Taiwan, Abingdon-New York: Routledge, 2016.
- Taiwan and the ‘China Impact’. Challenges and Opportunities, Abingdon-New York: Routledge, 2016.
- 主动的地方政治 – 作为战略群体的县乡干部 (Proactive Local Politics: County and Township Cadres as Strategic Group), Beijing: Central Compilation & Translation Press, 2013 (with Thomas Heberer and Yang Xuedong).
- 台商研究 (Taishang Studies), Taipei: Wunan, 2012 (with Keng Shu and Lin Rui-hwa).
- Taiwanese Identity in the 21st Century. Domestic, regional and global perspectives, London-New York: Routledge, 2011 (with Jens Damm).
- Regime Legitimacy in Contemporary China. Institutional Change and Stability, London-New York: Routledge, 2009 (with Thomas Heberer).
- Asian European Relations: building blocks for global governance?, London-New York: Routledge, 2008 (with Jürgen Rüland, Cornelia Storz and Günter Schucher).
- 城乡公民参与和政治合法性 (engl.: Civil Participation and Political Legitimacy in Contemporary China), Beijing: Central Compilation and Translation Press, 2007 (with He Zengke and Thomas Heberer).
- Navigieren in der Weltgesellschaft. Festschrift für Rainer Tetzlaff, Münster: LIT, 2005 (with Cord Jakobeit, Ulf Engel and Andreas Mehler).
- China: Konturen einer Übergangsgesellschaft auf dem Weg in das 21. Jahrhundert, Hamburg: Institut für Asienkunde, 2001.
- Menschenrechte in Ostasien. Zur Universalität einer umstrittenen Idee II, Tübingen: Mohr-Siebeck 1999.
- Blockierte Demokratien in der Dritten Welt, Opladen: Leske+Budrich 1998 (with Rainer Tetzlaff).
- Taiwan an der Schwelle zum 21. Jahrhundert. Gesellschaftlicher Wandel, Probleme und Perspektiven eines asiatischen Schwellenlandes, Hamburg: Institut für Asienkunde, 1996 (with Axel Schneider).
- Politischer Wandel und Demokratisierung. Theorie und Anwendung des Konzeptes der strategischen und konfliktfähigen Gruppen, Münster: LIT 1994 (with Rainer Tetzlaff and Werner Vennewald).
