= North American Taiwan Studies Association =

American academic nonprofit organization

The North American Taiwan Studies Association (NATSA) is an American 501(c)(3) nonprofit academic organization established in 1994. It is operated by Taiwanese students, North American doctoral students, and recent graduates who are interested in Taiwan studies. The NATSA annual conferences are the largest academic events on Taiwan studies in North America. The conferences provide scholars and Taiwan studies students a regular forum to meet and exchange intellectual ideas, and they also allow for researchers focusing on East Asia and beyond to receive dynamic feedback and broaden their academic horizons.

== Early history ==
When NATSA was founded, it was known as the North American Taiwan Studies Conference and was located on the web at www.natsc.org until August 2006 when it switched to its current address.

== Conferences ==
Year	Location	Conference Theme	President(s)
1994	Yale University	Inaugural North American Taiwan Studies Conference	
1995	Yale University	History and Nationalism	Chia-lung Lin 林佳龍
1996	Michigan State University	The Politics of Ethnicity and Identity	Jih-wen Lin 林繼文
1997	University of California, Berkeley	Mapping the Terrain of Taiwan Studies	Chung-Hsien Huang 黃崇憲
1998	University of Texas, Austin	Putting Taiwan in Global Perspective	Mei-Lin Pan 潘美玲
1999	University of Wisconsin, Madison	Re-Imagining Political Community: Taiwan Facing the New Millennium	Wei-der Shu 許維德
2000	Harvard University	Taiwan 2000: Envisioning a Pluralistic Future	Tze-Luen Lin 林子倫
2001	Washington University, Seattle	Seeking Taiwanese Perspectives: Interdisciplinary Reflection and Dialogue	Chien-Juh Gu 辜千祝
2002	University of Chicago	Power, Knowledge Production, and Agency: Towards a Critical Taiwan Studies	Hsiu-hua Shen 沈秀華
2003	Rutgers University	Changes, Continuity and Contestations in the Taiwanese Society	Jeffrey Hou 侯志仁
2004	University of Hawai'i, Manoa	Taiwan Studies in Comparative Perspectives	Jeffrey Hou 侯志仁
2005	University of Colorado, Boulder	Difference, Democracy, Justice: Toward an Inclusive Taiwanese Society	Chun-Chi Wang 王君琦
2006	University of California, Santa Cruz	Crossing the Borders, Fostering the Future: Taiwan Studies in the Intersections	Frank Cheng-Shan Liu 劉正山
2007	University of Wisconsin, Madison	Taiwan in the Nexus of Empires	Huey-Tyng Gau 高慧婷
2008	Washington University, Seattle	Translating the Political, Re-visioning the Social: What's the Next Turn for Taiwan?	Cheng-Yi Huang 黃丞儀
2009	University of Texas, Austin	Locating Taiwan: Space, Culture and Society	Hsun-Hui Tseng 曾薰慧
2010	University of California, Berkeley	China Effect: Securing Taiwan in an Age of Conflicts and Cooperation	Yi-tze Lee 李宜澤
2011	University of Pittsburgh	The Trajectory of Taiwan in a Global Context	Hsin-Yang Wu 吳欣陽
2012	Indiana University, Bloomington	Taiwan: Gateway, Node, Liminal Space	Chris Chih-Ming Liang 梁志鳴
2013	University of California, Santa Barbara	Taiwan in Theory	Laura Jo-Han Wen 溫若含
2014	University of Wisconsin, Madison	The Zeitgeists of Taiwan: Looking Back, Moving Forward	Dominic Meng-Hsuan Yang 楊孟軒
2015	Harvard University, Boston	Motions and the Motionless: (Dis/Re-) Connecting Taiwan to the World	Feng-En Tu 涂豐恩
2016	University of Toronto	Taiwan Studies in Trans* Perspectives: Transdisciplinary, Transnational, and Transcultural	Ching-Fang Hsu 許菁芳
2017	Stanford University	RE: Taiwan as Practice, Method, and Theory	Chi-ting Peng 彭琪庭 Hsin-hung Yeh 葉信鴻
2018	University of Texas, Austin	Beyond an Island: Taiwan in Comparative Perspective	Shu-Wen Tang 湯舒雯
2019	University of Washington, Seattle	Destabilizing Empires from the Margin: Taiwan Studies in Reflection	Eric Siu-kei Cheng 鄭肇祺
2020+1(2020 conference was postponed due to COVID)	University of California, Irvine (online)	Keywording Taiwan	Ta-Yang Hsieh 謝大洋
2022	George Washington University (D.C.)	Taiwan Studies in Application	JhuCin Rita Jhang 張竹芩
2023	University of California, Irvine	Resistance and Resilience: Repositioning Taiwan	Chee-Hann Wu 吳稚涵
2024	CUNY John Jay College of Criminal Justice	Taiwan Studies Matters: Worlding the Contested Frontier	Yung-Ying Chang 張詠瑛
2025	Stanford University	Toward and Otherwise in Taiwan and Beyond	Yi-Ting Chung 鍾宜庭
2026	Indiana University Bloomington	Resonance/Dissonance — Taiwan Studies, Knowledge Production, and Power Asymmetry	I-lin Liu 劉以霖

== NATSA-initiated projects ==
=== NATSA Professional Development Webinar Series ===
The NATSA professional development webinars started in August, 2017. The objectives of the series are:

- Enhance members’ professional skills
- Strengthen professional networks of members in the academia and the industry
- Promote NATSA to non-members

So far, topics of the NATSA professional developmental webinar series included:
Date	Topic	Guest speaker
2017/8/12	Life after PhD— Navigating Assistant Professorship	Chia-chen Yang (University of Memphis) I-chun Catherine Chang (Macalester College)
2017/10/1	Fieldnotes from Academic Job Markets	John Chung-en Liu (Occidental College)
2017/11/4	Connecting Science to Taiwan: Learning, Organization, and Action	Ting-chun Kuo (University of British Columbia) Yen-yung Chang (Caltech)
2018/1/14	Conferences: Participant Observation from an Anthropologist	Derek Sheridan (Brandeis University)
2018/2/24	Introduction of Instructional Technology	Elu Tu (Southern Connecticut State University)
2018/3/30	Taiwanese Studies in Europe: Research, Academia, and Job Market	Ming-yeh Rawnsley (SOAS) Adina Zemanek (Jagiellonian University)
2018/4/8	Job Application and Experience in Asia-Pacific Academia	Harry Wu (Hong Kong University)
2018/12/9	Getting Familiar with Quantitative Research(er)	Cheng-Tong Wang (Evaluation and Research Department of a national NGO) Chengshi Shiu (UCLA School of Nursing)

=== NATSA Podcast ===
NATSA Podcast

2019-2021 Season 1: Chats with Scholars

2021-2022 Season 2: 研究生轉運站

=== Taiwan Studies Syllabus Project ===
Taiwan Syllabus Project

=== Experts in Taiwan Studies crowd-sourcing project ===
Experts in Taiwan Studies

=== Taiwan Studies Workshop Fund ===
Taiwan Studies Fund

=== The Future of Taiwan Studies in a Post COVID world ===
Future of Taiwan Studies Post COVID

- Ep 1. COVID-19 and Governance Social and Global Solidarity
- Ep 2. How does the Hong Kong Security Law and "Decoupling from China" Impact Taiwan
- Ep 3. The Impact of the COVID-19 Crisis on Taiwan's External Relations: Views from Japan
- Ep 4. From Taiwanese-language Films to the Future of Taiwan Cinema
