= Caroline Kennedy-Pipe =

British political scientist, military historian

- Born: 1961 (age 64–65)
- Children: 1 son

Academic background
- Thesis: The Soviet Union and the United States Military Presence in Europe: 1943-1956. (1992)

Academic work
- Institutions: British International Studies Association; Loughborough University
- Doctoral students: Andrew Mumford

Caroline Kennedy-Pipe (born 1961) is a British political scientist, a military historian, and an expert on War Studies whose research interests include the contemporary history of war, the ethics of war, Cold War politics, terrorism, and Russian foreign policy. She is President of the British International Studies Association (BISA) and she was Chair of the BISA from 2004 to 2006.

== Academic career ==
In 2018, Kennedy-Pipe was Visiting Fellow at the Rothermere Institute, University of Oxford and from 2018 to 2019 she was a Specialist Advisor to the House of Commons Defence Committee.

She was Chair of War Studies at the University of Warwick and had been Chair of IR, University of Sheffield. Her previous teaching posts include Reader in Politics at the Durham University and Director of the Institute for International Studies at the University of Leeds.

Since 2018, she has been a professor of International Relations (IR) and International Security at the School of Social, Political and Geographical Sciences, Loughborough University. Prior to joining the Loughborough University, she was a professor of War Studies and Director of the Centre for Security Studies at the University of Hull.

== Works ==
- Terrorism and Political Violence (2015)
- The Origins of the Present Troubles in Northern Ireland (2014)
- Security Studies: the Basics (2013)
- Russia and the World 1917-1991 (2011)
- The Origins of the Cold War (2007)
- International Security Issues in a Global Age: Securing the Twenty-first Century (2000) with Clive Jones
- Death from Above: The Evolution of Drone Warfare (1999) with James Rogers
- Stalin's Cold War: Soviet Strategies in Europe, 1943 to 1956 (1995)
