= The Secret Royals =

Book about the British royal family and espionage

First edition cover

The Secret Royals: Spying and the Crown, from Victoria to Diana is a book by Richard J. Aldrich and Rory Cormac about the relationship between the British royal family and British intelligence agencies. It was published in 2021 by Atlantic Books. In the foreword to the book Aldrich and Cormac write of the difficulty of researching the book, noting that "writing about spies is challenging; writing about royals is more difficult; and writing about spies and royals has sometimes seemed impossible".

The Secret Royals was reviewed in The Times by Richard White and Ben Macintyre. It was reviewed in The Daily Telegraph by Matthew Dennison. Dennison described the book as full of "Piquant, poignant and unexpected details [that] humanise the business of monarchy" and offered an "intriguing alternative narrative of British royal history". In The Times Literary Supplement the book was reviewed by historian Richard Davenport-Hines.

The Secret Royals was named a Book of the Year by the Daily Mail and a Best Book of 2021 by The Times and Sunday Times.
