= International Journal of Taiwan Studies =

- Discipline: Taiwan studies
- Language: English
- Edited by: Ming-Yeh Rawnsley

Publication details
- History: 2018–present
- Publisher: Brill
- Open access: Hybrid

Standard abbreviations
- ISO 4: Int. J. Taiwan Stud.

Indexing
- ISSN: 2468-8797 (print); 2468-8800 (web)

Links
- Journal homepage

International Journal of Taiwan Studies (IJTS) (Chinese: 臺灣研究國際學刊) is a hybrid open access biannual peer-reviewed academic journal in English hosting by the Centre of Taiwan Studies, School of Oriental and African Studies (SOAS), University of London. This journal covers all aspects of Taiwan Studies, including social sciences, Taiwanese art, Taiwanese literature, culture of Taiwan, history of Taiwan and humanities, and interdisciplinary topics. It is published by Brill Publishers and cosponsored by Academia Sinica and the European Association of Taiwan Studies. Its Editor-in-Chief is Ming-Yeh Rawnsley. It is established in 2018 and abstracted and indexed by Scopus.

== Cooperation ==
The Ministry of Foreign Affairs of the Republic of China (Taiwan) supports this journal's editorial board.

== History ==
In March 2018, this journal launched with support from scholars in Taiwan and in Europe.

In 2020, this journal became an affiliate journal of the North American Taiwan Studies Association (NATSA). In 2021, it also became one of partner organisations of the Japan Association for Taiwan Studies (JATS) invited it to become.
