= Ming-Yeh Rawnsley =

Taiwanese scholar

- 蔡明燁; Tsai Ming-Yeh
- Born: 1965 (age 60–61); Kaohsiung, Taiwan
- Known for: Editor-in-Chief of International Journal of Taiwan Studies
- Spouse: Gary D. Rawnsley

Academic background
- Education: University of Leeds
- Thesis: Public Service Television in Taiwan (1998)

Academic work
- Institutions: SOAS University of London

Ming-Yeh Tsai Rawnsley (Chinese: 蔡明燁; born 1965) is a Taiwanese media scholar, writer, and former journalist and TV screenwriter. Since 2013, she has been a Research Associate at Centre of Taiwan Studies, SOAS University of London. She is also Non-Resident Senior Fellow at the China Policy Institute, University of Nottingham (2014–present), Research Fellow at the European Research Centre on Contemporary Taiwan (ERCCT), University of Tübingen (2015–present), and Research Associate at Academia Sinica, Taiwan (2018–present). M-Y T. Rawnsley is the Editor-in-Chief of International Journal of Taiwan Studies (2018–present ) and associate editor of East Asian Journal of Popular Culture (2013–present).

== Career ==
After graduating from the National Taiwan University in 1988, where she studied library science, Tsai went to the Institute of Communications Studies (ICS), University of Leeds in England for an MA and a PhD in communication studies. In 1998, she completed her PhD with a thesis about public service television in Taiwan.

She served as a research fellow at the Institute of Asia-Pacific Studies (IAPS) of the University of Nottingham, where she researched mainly on the media and democratization in Taiwan (2000–2005), and a news editor of the British International Studies Association. In 2005, she went to China with her husband, Gary D. Rawnsley, a British political scientist, to work at the University of Nottingham Ningbo China. She was the Head of School of Chinese Studies and the IAPS's branch in Ningbo. In 2007, they both left Ningbo for the University of Leeds where Tsai began researching the Chinese-language cinema. Between 2017 and 2013, she researched and taught East Asian film industries at the ICS, University of Leeds.

== Works ==
=== Books ===
- The Clandestine Cold War in Asia, 1945–65: Western Intelligence, Propaganda and Special Operations (Taylor & Francis, 2000) with Richard J. Aldrich and Gary D. Rawnsley
- 媒體世界 [The World of the Media] (2001)
- 英倫書房 [Study Room in England] (2001)
- 英倫蛀書蟲 [A Bookworm in England] (2004)
- Political Communications in Greater China: The Construction and Reflection of Identity ( Routledge, 2006) with Gary D. Rawnsley
- Global Chinese Cinema: The Culture and Politics of 'Hero' (Routledge, 2011) with Gary D. Rawnsley
- Routledge Handbook of Chinese Media (Routledge, 2015) with Gary D. Rawnsley
- 看見台灣電影之光 [Discovering Taiwan Cinema] (2015)
- 界定跨科際 [Framing Trans-Disciplinarity: Bridging the Sciences and Humanities] (2015)
- 印象之旅：台灣電影、戲劇和景觀藝術的口述歷史 [An Oral History of Cinema, Theatre and Landscape Sculpture in Taiwan] (2013)
- Taiwan Cinema: International Reception and Social Change (Routledge, 2017) with Kuei-Fen Chiu and Gary D. Rawnsley
- Critical Security, Democratisation and Television in Taiwan (Routledge, 2018) with Gary D. Rawnsley
- Cultural and Social Change in Taiwan: Society, Cinema and Theatre (Routledge, 2019)

=== Selected journal articles ===
- Screening the Port City: Poetics and Promotions. Genre 55.2 (2022): 85–115.
- The State of the Field of Global Taiwan Studies Institutions: A Time for Optimism or Pessimism?. International Journal of Taiwan Studies 1.2 (2018): 371–394.
- Anti–Media-Monopoly Policies and Further Democratisation in Taiwan. Journal of Current Chinese Affairs 105 (2014): 105–128.
- Taiwanese-Language Cinema: State versus Market, National versus Transnational. Oriental Archive 81.3 (2013): 437–458.
- Cinema, Historiography, and Identities in Taiwan: Hou Hsiao-Hsien's A City of Sadness. Asian Cinema 22.2 (2011): 196–213.
- Media Reform since 1987. China Perspectives 56 (2004): 46–55.
- Chiang Kai-shek and the 28 February 1947 Incident: A Reassessment. Issues & Studies 37.6 (2001): 77–106.
- Regime Transition and the Media in Taiwan. Democratization 5.2 (1998): 106–124.
