= Thomas McMahon (Irish republican) =

Irish republican (born 1948)

- Born: 1948 (age 77–78); Monaghan, County Monaghan, Ireland
- Children: 2
- Military career
- Allegiance: Provisional Irish Republican Army
- Service years: 1970–1990 or 1998
- Rank: Volunteer
- Unit: Provisional IRA South Armagh Brigade
- Known for: Assassination of Lord Mountbatten
- Conflict: The Troubles

Thomas McMahon (born 1948) is an Irish former volunteer in the South Armagh Brigade of the Provisional Irish Republican Army (IRA), and was one of the IRA's most experienced bomb-makers. McMahon was convicted of the murder of Lord Louis Mountbatten, his grandson and two others, off the coast of Mullaghmore, County Sligo, in the west of Ireland.

== Early life ==
Thomas McMahon was born in 1948 in County Monaghan. One of seven children in his family, he grew up on a rural farm near the Ulster border, which was owned by his father, James. He completed his education at Carrickmacross Technical School and became a carpenter.

McMahon's first known involvement in politics was in a Sinn Féin-led protest against the eviction of an itinerant family near Carrickmacross from an empty house when he was twenty years old.

== IRA activity ==
McMahon and accomplice Francis McGirl planted a bomb in Shadow V, a 27-foot (8-metre) fishing boat owned by Mountbatten at Mullaghmore, County Sligo, near Donegal Bay. Lord Mountbatten was killed on 27 August 1979 by the bomb blast along with three other people: Doreen Knatchbull (Mountbatten's elder daughter's mother-in-law); his grandson Nicholas Knatchbull; and a 15-year-old crewmember Paul Maxwell. McMahon was arrested by the Gardaí at a Garda checkpoint between Longford and Granard on suspicion of driving a stolen vehicle two hours before the bomb detonated. The IRA claimed responsibility for the bombing in a statement released immediately afterwards that said: "This operation is one of the discriminate ways we can bring to the attention of the English people the continuing occupation of our country."

McMahon was identified as a possible suspect in the assassination almost immediately. Garda senior forensic scientist James O'Donovan examined the clothes McMahon had been wearing at the time of his arrest and was able to uncover flecks of paint from Mountbatten's boat and traces of nitroglycerine. Based on these findings, McMahon was charged with murder in the Republic of Ireland. He was convicted on 23 November 1979 and sentenced to life imprisonment. After serving almost 20 years in prison, McMahon was released in 1998 under the terms of the Good Friday Agreement.

== After prison ==
After his release, Toby Harnden in Bandit Country reported that McMahon was holding a tricolour in the first rank of the IRA colour party at a 1998 IRA meeting in Cullyhanna. However, according to a BBC report, McMahon has said that he had left the IRA in 1990.

He has twice refused to meet Paul Maxwell's father, John, who has sought him out to explain the reasons for his son's death. In an interview for The Daily Telegraph in 2009, Maxwell stated that he had "made two approaches to McMahon, the first through a priest, who warned me in advance that he thought there wouldn't be any positive response. And there wasn't. I have some reservations about meeting him, obviously – it might work out in such a way that I would regret having made the contact. On the other hand, if we met and I could even begin to understand his motivation. If we could meet on some kind of a human level, a man to man level, it could help me come to terms with it. But that might be very optimistic. McMahon knows the door is open at this end."

McMahon's wife has stated, "Tommy never talks about Mountbatten, only the boys who died. He does have genuine remorse. Oh God yes."

As of 2009, McMahon was living with his wife in a hillside bungalow in Lisanisk, Carrickmacross, County Monaghan. He has two grown sons. He helped with Martin McGuinness's presidential campaign in 2011, erecting posters for McGuinness around Carrickmacross, and also canvassed for Sinn Féin's Matt Carthy in the 2014 European Parliament elections.
