= Mari Fitzduff =

Irish academic

Mari Christine Fitzduff (born March 15, 1947, in Dublin) is an Irish policy maker, writer and academic. She began her work in peacebuilding and mediation working with universities during the Northern Ireland conflict before setting up a mediation organisation in 1989. In 1990 she was a founding director of the Community Relations Council, set up to help develop and fund peace initiatives in Northern Ireland.

Ftizduff was later part of forming INCORE, a United Nations conflict policy research center at the University of Ulster. In 2004 she became founding director of the international Masters of Conflict and Coexistence program at the Heller School in Brandeis University, Waltham, US.

== Career ==
Fitzduff began professional peacebuilding work in 1986. Living in Northern Ireland during the conflict in 1969-1998, she set up the first courses in conflict resolution and mediation in both Queen's University Belfast and Ulster University. She went on to found Mediation Northern Ireland in 1988, an organisation which trained and supplied mediators for community and political mediations throughout Northern Ireland in the context of the conflict.

From 1990-97 she was the Founding Director of the Community Relations Council, an independent body that was funded by both British and European funds. It helped develop and fund many of the conflict resolution initiatives in Northern Ireland.

From 1997-2003, she held a chair in conflict Resolution at the University of Ulster where she was the Director of UNU/INCORE, an International Conflict Research Institute which was a joint initiative of the United Nations University and the University of Ulster. It conducts policy relevant international research on conflict issues around the world.

In 2004, she became the Founding Director of the Masters Conflict and Coexistence programme at Brandeis University, which is an international program, for experienced professionals from conflict regions around the world.

== Degrees ==
- New University of Ulster, Ph.D. Social Psychology
- Queen's University, Belfast Diploma Management
- University of Ulster, MA
- University of Ulster, Diploma
- Trinity College Dublin, Diploma Education
- University College Dublin (UCD), BA

== Quotes ==
"Nobody wants the final compromise to come too quickly ... because it's the end of the dream for both sides. It will have to be a perforated border as opposed to a united Ireland, and Unionists will have to abandon dreams of complete unity with the British motherland".

== Publications ==
- Fitzduff, Mari (30 September 2021). Our Brains at War: The Neuroscience of Conflict and Peacebuilding. Oxford University Press. ISBN 978-0-19-751265-4.
- Fitzduff, Mari; Williams, Sue (16 January 2019). Dialogue in divided societies: Skills for working with groups in conflict.
- Fitzduff, Mari, ed. (13 February 2017). Why Irrational Politics Appeals: Understanding the Allure of Trump. Praeger Press. ASIN 1440855145.
- Fitzduff, Mari, ed. (2013). Public Policies in Shared Societies. doi:10.1057/9781137276322. ISBN 978-1-349-44661-2.
- Fitzduff, Mari (30 December 2005). Stout, Chris E. (ed.). The Psychology of Resolving Global Conflicts: From War to Peace. Praeger Press. ISBN 0275982017.
- Fitzduff, Mari (2002). "Beyond violence : Conflict resolution in Northern Ireland". UN University Press/Brookings.
- Fitzduff, Mari (January 1988). Community Conflict Skills: A Handbook for Anti-Sectarian Work in Northern Ireland. Community Conflict Skills Project. ISBN 978-0-9513209-0-7.
