= Taissir Tamimi =

Personal details
- Born: Hebron
- Occupation: Deputy Chief Islamic Judge of the PNA (2000-)

Sheikh Taissir Bayood al-Tamimi (Arabic: شيخ تيسير التميمي is the chief Islamic judge of the Palestinian National Authority (PNA).

== Islamic judge ==
Prior to being appointed Inspector of the Sharia Courts by Yasser Arafat in 1994, Tamimi had served as a judge of the Sharia court in Bethlehem and then Hebron in 1986. From 1997 to 1999, he served as the acting Qadi al-Quda ("Chief Islamic Judge") on behalf of Abu Sardane who relocated to Jordan. In April 1998, Tamimi set up a committee to work towards establishing a personal status law that would be effective in the West Bank and Gaza Strip "as a basic step in establishing the [Palestinian] state." He was formally appointed by Arafat as Deputy Qadi al-Quda by a presidential decree in March 2000.

Tamimi came into open conflict with the Grand Mufti of Jerusalem, Sheikh Ekrima Sa'id Sabri, during a November 2001 seminar. The sharpest conflict was about reforms in the Sharia system, particularly their positions on the age of marriage. Tamimi argued that it was an issue on which legal jurists disagreed and therefore interpretation should be permitted; he personally advocated the legal marriage age be raised to 18 and older while Sabri supported the position that minors could be married at puberty. Their views also contrasted on other issues, with Tamimi supporting women's rights, the establishment of political parties, and religious scholars for legal reform whereas Sabri preferred traditional Islamic law.

Tamimi held a vigil at Arafat's deathbed in November 2004 and witnessed his death. He refused to allow doctors to remove Arafat from life support as it conflicted with Muslim law. In 2007, responding to a Hamas ban on public prayer rallies in the Gaza Strip, Tamimi declared the ban was issued "by those who are not authorized to do so."

== Political views ==
In October 2008, he issued a fatwa that banned Arab residents of Jerusalem from participating in that year's municipal elections.

In April 2009, he warned Palestinians of a preexisting fatwa which bans them from selling property to Jews under penalty of death.

Countering Jewish historical and religious claims to Jerusalem, Tamimi asserted that "the Jews have no rights in Jerusalem," claiming that there is no proof that "Jews had a history or presence in Jerusalem," and that "Jerusalem is an Arab and Islamic city and it always has been so."

== Papal controversy ==
During an interfaith dialogue in Jerusalem on May 11, 2009 with Pope Benedict XVI, Tamimi allegedly launched into a 10-minute-long condemnation of Israel, urging Christians and Muslims to unite against Israel, the Israeli Newspaper the Jerusalem Post stated. As a result of Tamimi's words, Pope Benedict is said to have walked out of the meeting early. In response to Tamimi's unscheduled interruption, the press office of the Holy See issued a condemnatory statement: "In a meeting dedicated to dialogue this intervention was a direct negation of what a dialogue should be." Tamimi staged a similar verbal attack against Israel during Pope John Paul II's visit to the country in 2000, the Jerusalem Post stated.

== Political party ==
In December 2012 there were reports that Tamimi was setting up a political party, Haris ('Guard'). An inaugural ceremony on December 12, 2012 was disrupted by PNA security forces. According to Maan News Agency, the new party was linked to and funded by the Modern Egypt Party.

== Bibliography ==
- Welchman, Lynn (2004). Women's rights and Islamic family law: perspectives on reform. Zed Books. ISBN 1-84277-095-0.
- Welchman, Lynn (2000). Beyond the code: Muslim family law and the shariʼa judiciary in the Palestinian West Bank. BRILL. ISBN 90-411-8859-2.
