= East Asian Journal of Popular Culture =

Academic journal

East Asian Journal of Popular Culture is a UK academic peer-reviewed journal covering topics related to the popular culture of East Asian culture sphere. It was established in 2015 and is published by Intellect, an independent academic publisher. This journal is devoted to all aspects of East Asian popular culture and the interplay between East Asia and the rest of the world. Its co-editors are Kate Taylor-Jones, Ann Heylen, and Edward Vickers. It is abstracted and indexed by British Humanities Index (BHI) and Scopus.
