= Richard J. Aldrich =

British political scientist and historian

Richard J. Aldrich FRHistS
- Born: Richard James Aldrich; 7 December 1961 (age 64); Rochdale, England
- Children: 2

Academic background
- Education: University of Cambridge

Academic work
- Institutions: University of Warwick
- Doctoral students: Andrew Mumford
- Notable works: The Secret Royals

Richard James Aldrich FRHistS (born 7 December 1961) is a British political scientist and a historian of espionage who has written intensively about intelligence and security communities.

== Life ==
In 1990 Aldrich gained his PhD from Corpus Christi College, University of Cambridge.

He was a professor at the School of Politics and International Relations, University of Nottingham and was co-editor of the journal Intelligence and National Security for eight years. Since September 2007, he has been a professor of International Security at the Department of Politics and International Studies, University of Warwick.

In 2017, Aldrich received the Intelligence Studies Section Distinguished Scholar Award from the International Studies Association for his contributions to intelligence studies.

== Works ==
=== Monographs ===
- The Black Door Lib/E: Spies, Secret Intelligence, and British Prime Ministers (William the 4th, 2020)
- GCHQ: The Uncensored Story of Britain's Most Secret Intelligence Agency (HarperPress, 2010)
- Intelligence and the War against Japan: Britain, America and the Politics of Secret Service (Cambridge University Press, 2008)
- The Faraway War: Personal Diaries of the Second World War in Asia and the Pacific (Transworld Publishers Limited, 2006)
- Witness To War: Diaries Of The Second World War In Europe And The Middle East (Doubleday, 2004)
- The Hidden Hand: Britain, America, and Cold War Secret Intelligence (John Murray Press, 2001)
- Intelligence and the War Against Japan: Britain, America and the Politics of Secret Service (Cambridge University Press, 2000)
- Espionage, Security and Intelligence in Britain, 1945-1970 (Manchester University Press, 1998)
- The Key to the South: Britain, the United States, and Thailand During the Approach of the Pacific War, 1929-1942 (Oxford University Press, 1993)
- British Intelligence, Strategy and the Cold War, 1945-51 (Taylor & Francis, 1992)

=== Co-authored books ===
- The Secret Royals: Spying and the Crown, from Victoria to Diana (Atlantic Books, 2021) with Rory Cormac
- Secret Intelligence: A Reader (Routledge, 2019) with Christopher Andrew and Wesley K. Wark
- Spying on the World: The Declassified Documents of the Joint Intelligence Committee, 1936-2013 (Edinburgh University Press, 2014) with Rory Cormac and Michael S. Goodman
- The Clandestine Cold War in Asia, 1945-65: Western Intelligence, Propaganda and Special Operations (Taylor & Francis, 2000) with Ming-Yeh Rawnsley and Gary D. Rawnsley
- Intelligence, Defence and Diplomacy: British Policy in the Post-War World (Taylor & Francis, 1994) with Michael F. Hopkins
