= Taiwan studies =

Area studies focused on Taiwan

Taiwan studies, or Taiwanese studies, is a multi-disciplinary academic division of area studies (a part of East Asian studies) focused on studying Taiwan and the people on/in/of Taiwan both on its own and in comparison with other world areas. Academia Sinica, Taiwan's national level research institute, officially inaugurated its Institute of Taiwan History in 2004 following a long exploratory period beginning in 1986. Taiwan studies departments and centers have been established in numerous universities around the world (see below for a list) and key Taiwan studies organizations have been established in North America (NATSA), Europe (EATS), and Japan (JATS). The first World Congress of Taiwan Studies (WCTS) was hosted by Taiwan's Academia Sinica on April 26–28, 2012, in Taipei, Taiwan.

== History of Taiwan Studies ==
As with all area studies, funding and interest in Taiwan studies has largely followed American and other nations' changing political interests. Japanese interest in Taiwan studies preceded significant Western interest in the island and its diverse set of people beginning as a part of maintaining its own colonial interests there (Taiwan was a Japanese colony from 1895-1945), and continuing in a post-colonial mode following the handover of Taiwan to the Republic of China (ROC) following its defeat in World War II. An early peak of interest by Western scholars in studying Taiwan occurred following the defeat of the Kuomintang (KMT) in the Chinese Civil War and its subsequent retreat to Taiwan beginning in 1947. With China's Communist Party taking power in mainland China, the mainland quickly became off-limits for the vast majority of Western sinologists (exceptions included William Hinton, author of Fan Shen). This closing off, in concert with the United States' strong political and military support for Taiwan and British Hong Kong as bulwarks against Communist expansion, ushered in a "golden age" for the study of China beyond China, including increasing studies of "Chinese" in Hong Kong and Taiwan. Following diplomatic shifts of recognition away from the Taiwan-based ROC towards the China-based PRC beginning in the late 1970s and picking up speed with China's reform and opening up, academics once again began to shift their focus on China to the mainland. Western academic interest in Taiwan continued at a lower rate with a relatively strong focus on the politics of Taiwan-China-United States relations across the Taiwan Straits.

Leading up to the end of martial law in Taiwan in 1987, a space began to open up for criticism of KMT authoritarian rule and the beginnings of discussions of a history of the people of the geographic islands of Taiwan. Previous history textbooks that students in martial law Taiwan studied from began history centered on dynastic events in China and only shifted focus to the island the students lived on as the KMT retreated to Taiwan in 1947. This Taiwanization movement suggested instead that it was worthwhile to study the local history of Taiwan itself: a history which included long periods of habitation by disparate groups of aboriginal peoples, early colonizations by European powers, rule by Koxinga (Zheng Chenggong), waves of migrations of Hok'lo and then Hakka Chinese people from mainland China, a short period of nominal Qing "Chinese" Rule, and a Japanese colonial period all prior to the establishment of Taiwan as the base of power of the ROC in exile. In academia, Taiwanization and democratization in Taiwan brought about a new interest in studying Taiwan and its people without assuming that they are representative of something, or at least of a single something, "Chinese."

Taiwan studies today involves a wide range of disciplines in the humanities and social sciences both in Taiwan and beyond it that work to take Taiwan itself as a central subject of analysis. This includes not just work on Taiwanese or Aboriginal groups on Taiwan, but also includes comparative work as well as work that focuses on cross-straits issues and "Chinese" (or Han, Hok'lo, or Hakka) cultures as instantiated on Taiwan. The biggest difference in the latter work is that Taiwan studies scholars who study "Chinese" culture on Taiwan do so with an understanding of the vast range of historical, political, and economic influences on Taiwan's people that have been completely different from those that have influenced "Chinese" heritage peoples in, for example, Hong Kong, Singapore, or the PRC.

In 2021, UCLA received a $2 million gift from Taiwan's Ministry of Foreign Affairs through the Taipei Economic and Cultural Office to establish a Taiwan Studies Endowment Fund and support its Taiwan Studies Program. UC San Diego received a $5 million commitment from an alumnus to establish a Center for Taiwan Studies within the Division of Arts and Humanities.

== University-based Taiwan Studies Programs Worldwide ==
=== Asia ===
==== Taiwan ====
===== National Dong Hwa University =====
- Department of Taiwan and Regional Studies (Chinese: 臺灣文化學系) at NDHU College of Humanities and Social Sciences
- Department of Sinophone Literature (Chinese: 華文文學系) at NDHU College of Humanities and Social Sciences
- Department of Ethnic Relations and Cultures (Chinese: 族群關係與文化學系) at NDHU College of Indigenous Studies

===== National Cheng Kung University =====
- Department of Taiwanese Literature (Chinese: 台灣文學系)

===== National Taiwan Normal University =====
- Department of Taiwan Culture, Languages and Literature (Chinese: 臺灣語文學系)
- International Taiwan Studies Center

===== National Taipei University of Education =====
- Graduate School of Taiwanese Culture (Chinese: 臺灣文化研究所)

===== National Taiwan Library =====
- Taiwan Study Research Center

===== National Taiwan University =====
- The Center for Taiwan Studies at College of Liberal Arts

==== Japan ====
- Waseda Taiwan Research Institute, Waseda University, Tokyo, Japan

=== North America ===
- Taiwan Studies, University of Alberta, Canada
- The Research Chair in Taiwan Studies, University of Ottawa, Ontario, Canada
- Taiwan Studies, University of California, Los Angeles, California, United States
- UCLA-NTNU Taiwan Studies Initiative, University of California, Los Angeles and National Taiwan Normal University
- The Taiwan Democracy Project, Stanford University, California, United States
- Center for Taiwan Studies, University of California, Santa Barbara, California, United States
- Taiwan Studies, University of California, San Diego, California, United States
- Taiwan Studies Program, University of Texas, Austin, Texas, United States
- The Taiwan Studies Initiative, Center for East Asian Studies, University of Wisconsin-Madison
- Taiwan Studies Program, University of Washington, Washington, United States

=== Europe ===
- Vienna Center for Taiwan Studies, University of Vienna, Austria
- Taiwanese Studies Chair, KU Leuven, Belgium
- European Research Center on Contemporary Taiwan, University of Tübingen, Germany
- Taiwan Study Center, University of Ljubljana, Slovenia
- Taiwan Research Programme, London School of Economics and Political Science, United Kingdom
- Center of Taiwan Studies, SOAS, University of London, United Kingdom
- Taiwan Studies Programme, University of Nottingham, United Kingdom
- Taiwan Studies Project, University of Zurich, Switzerland
- Taiwan Studies Programme, University of Oxford, United Kingdom

== See also ==
- Asian studies
- Chiang Ching-kuo Foundation
- Outline of Taiwan
- Sinology
- Sinophone Studies
