= Naren Chitty =

Sri Lankan-Australian diplomat and academic

Narendranath Jayantha (Naren) Chitty AM is a Sri Lankan-Australian diplomat, professor and writer. He was the Head of the Department of International Communication at Macquarie University in Sydney, Australia. Chitty published numerous books and articles in the field of foreign policy, international diplomacy, and soft power. In 2009, he was made a Member of the Order of Australia for services to education. In 2022, he was conferred the title of Professor Emeritus by the university.

== Early life and education ==
Chitty was born in Sri Lanka. He was the son of Capt S. A. and Doris Chitty. He obtained a degree in communication from the University of Westminster in London. He later earned a master of arts degree in international communication (1988) and a PhD in international relations (1992) from the American University in Washington D.C.

== Career ==
Chitty worked as a counsellor at the Embassy of Sri Lanka in Washington, D.C. from 1982 to 1987. While working at the embassy, he met Fidel Castro and was involved in the creation of the Arthur C. Clarke Foundation and convened the first meetings at the Sri Lanka Chancery in Washington DC. He also contributed to discussions that led to the idea for the International Space University.

Chitty joined the faculty of Macquarie University in 1989. Chitty became the Foundation Chair in International Communication at Macquarie in 2006. He served for a number of years as the Head of the Department of International Communication. He was also at times the Deputy Dean of the Division of Society, Culture, Media and Philosophy and an Associate Dean in the university's faculty of arts. Chitty was the inaugural director of the Soft Power Analysis and Resource Centre (SPARC) at Macquarie University and was a visiting lecturer at the Sorbonne Nouvelle University in Paris, the National University of Malaysia, the Communication University of China, and Jilin University and others.

Chitty was the lead editor of 1st edition (2017) and 2nd editions (2023) of The Routledge Handbook of Soft Power. The Institute for Cultural Relations Policy (ICRP) in Budapest has listed the 1st edition of the Routledge Handbook of Soft Power as one of the top 10 books on cultural diplomacy. Chitty was also the founder of The Journal of International Communication and its editor-in-chief from the journal's establishment in 1994 to 2024.

From 1996 to 2000, Chitty served as Secretary-General of the International Association for Media and Communication Research (IAMCR). His work has been linked to the early development of community radio in Sri Lanka.

Chitty retired from the university in May 2025.

== Personal life ==
Chitty is married to Dr. Gina Ismene Chitty, an Australian composer.

== Awards and honours ==
In 2009, Chitty was invested as a Member of the Order of Australia for services to education.

In 2022, he was made an Emeritus Professor by Macquarie University.

== Selected publications ==
Chitty's publications examine the intersections of soft power, public diplomacy, governance, and propaganda. They include:

- Chitty N, Hayden C, Ohnesorge H & Wang C (forthcoming).The Anthem Handbook of Soft Power and Public Diplomacy in the Age of AI. Anthem Press, London.
- Chitty N 2023. "An experiential theory of attraction-based influence (unintended and intended)", in Chitty, N, Ji L & Rawnsley G (eds.), The Routledge Handbook of Soft Power (2nd edition), Routledge, New York, pp. 6–34.
- Chitty N & Wang C 2023. "Soft power, US foreign policy, and George Washington's warning of 'Alternate Domination'", in Ohnesorge H (ed), Soft power and the future of US foreign policy, Manchester University Press, Manchester.
- Chitty N & Wang C 2023. "Essaying experience of soft power: CALD community narratives in New South Wales in COVID-19 pandemic times", in Chitty N, Ji L, & Rawnsley G (eds.). The Routledge Handbook of Soft Power (2nd edition), Routledge, New York.
- Chitty N 2021. "World propaganda and personal insecurity: Intent, content, and contentment", in Rawnsley G, Ma Y & Pothong K (eds), The Edward Elgar Handbook of Political Propaganda, Elgar Publishers, Cheltenham.
- Chitty N 2021. Soft power, public diplomacy and post-AUKUS Indo-Pacific security, Evatt Journal, 20(1).
- Chitty N 2020. "Australian public diplomacy", in Snow N and Cull N (eds) Routledge Handbook of Public Diplomacy, 2nd. edition, Routledge, New York.
- Chitty N 2019. "The Rise of Blunt Power in the Strongman Era Georgetown Journal of International Affairs. February 28, 2019
- Chitty N 2019. "Advancing Australia through soft power: virtue and virtuosity", The Journal of International Communication, 25,2.
- Chitty N 2017."Soft power, civic virtue and world politics", in Chitty N, Ji L, Rawnsley G & Hayden C (eds.), The Routledge Handbook of Soft Power (1st edition), Routledge, New York.
- Chitty, Naren, Ramona R. Rush, and Mehdi A. Semati, eds. 2003. Studies in Terrorism: Media Scholarship and the Enigma of Terror. Penang: Southbound. ISBN 983-9054-38-4
- Chitty, Naren, ed. 2002. Mapping Globalization. Penang: Southbound. ISBN 983-9054-24-4
