= Ely Karmon =

Israeli political scientist (born 1941)

- אלי כרמון
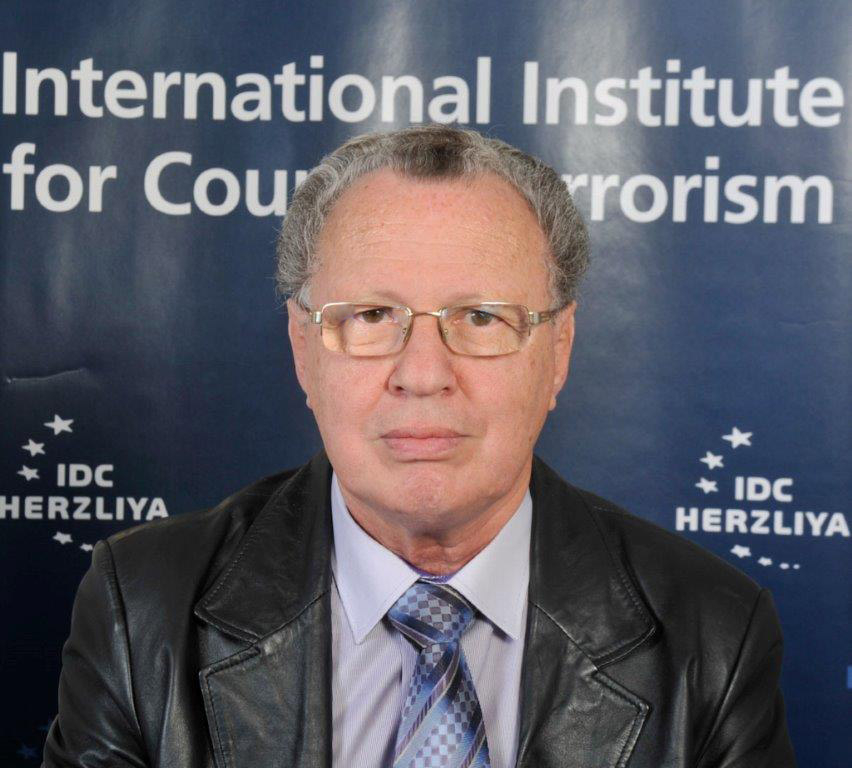
- Ely Karmon - ICT
- Born: May 3, 1941 (age 85)
- Occupation: Israeli political scientist

Dr Ely Karmon (Hebrew: אלי כרמון; born May 3, 1941) is an Israeli political scientist who is a senior research scholar at the International Institute for Counter-Terrorism (ICT) and senior research fellow at the Institute for Policy and Strategy, both at The Interdisciplinary Center Herzliya (IDC), in Israel. He also lectures there on Terrorism and Guerrilla in Modern Times.

== Career ==
He has a bachelor's degree in both English and French cultures from the Hebrew University of Jerusalem and MA and Ph.D. in political science from Haifa University.

He served as an advisor to the Israeli Ministry of Defense and participated in UN seminars preparing security at Athens 2004 and Beijing 2008 Olympics. He also briefed Shanghai authorities involved in security at the Expo 2010 on threat assessment to the event.

In addition to his work at the IDC, Karmon is an associate fellow at The International Centre for the Study of Radicalisation and Political Violence, in London, member of the International Permanent Observatory on security measures during major events at the United Nations Interregional Crime and Justice Research Institute, in Turin, Italy, member of the International Institute for Security and Cooperation, in Sofia, Bulgaria, member of the Atlantic Forum of Israel and is involved in NATO workshops on terrorism and on the Mediterranean Dialogue, and Has been a Fellow at the Proteus Management Group, at the Center for Strategic Leadership, U.S. Army War College, Carlisle, Pennsylvania.

He is also a member of the editorial board of Revista Universitas/Relaçoes Internacionais, journal of the Centro Universitário de Brasília and member of the scientific board of Centro Alti Studi per la lotta al terrorismo e alla violenza politica, Italy.

== Published works ==
Karmon has written extensively on international terrorism and strategic issues of the Middle East.

=== Books ===
- Hebrew – Coauthor with Robert A. Rockaway, 1996, לואיס פאראקן, אומת האסלאם והיהודים, Published by the American Jewish Committee
- In December 2003, while he was a visiting fellow at The Washington Institute for Near East Policy, his policy memorandum, titled Fight on All Fronts? Hizballah, the War on Terror, and the War in Iraq was published by the Institute.
- His book Coalitions between Terrorist Organizations: Revolutionaries, Nationalists, and Islamists was published in May 2005 by Brill Academic Publishers (Leiden and Boston)
- His book Iran–Syria-Hizballah–Hamas: A Coalition against Nature. Why does it Work? was published by The Center for Strategic Leadership, U.S. Army War College, in May 2008.

=== Articles (Sample) ===
- From the International Institute for Counter-Terrorism (ICT) site (2013–2014)
- Earlier articles (1998–2012), from the same site
- From "Ha'aretz"
- From The Jerusalem Post
- From "The Times of Israel" (2014)
