= Andrew Mumford (political scientist) =

British political scientist and historian

Andrew Mumford FRHistS
- Born: 1983 (age 42–43); North Yorkshire

Academic background
- Education: University of Sheffield; University of Warwick
- Thesis: From Belfast to Basra: Britain and the 'Tri-partite Counter-Insurgency Model' (2009)
- Doctoral advisor: Caroline Kennedy-Pipe, Richard J. Aldrich

Academic work
- Discipline: War studies
- Institutions: University of Nottingham
- Main interests: Proxy war; Counter-Insurgency; Terrorism; US Foreign Policy

Andrew Mumford FRHistS (born 1983) is a British political scientist, military historian, and Professor of War Studies in the School of Politics and International Relations at the University of Nottingham. He is a member of the EU/NATO Hybrid Threats Centre of Excellence expert pool on security and has consulted the UK Ministry of Defence and NATO. In December 2018, he was elected a Fellow of the Royal Historical Society. He is the editor of the Bloomsbury book series Studies in Contemporary Warfare.

== Academic career ==
In 2009, Mumford received his ESRC-funded PhD from the University of Warwick in International Relations. He was a Research Fellow at the International Centre for the Study of Terrorism (ICST) at Pennsylvania State University in 2007, and taught at the University of Hull (2009-2010) and University of Sheffield (2010-2011). He served as the Book Review Editor of Civil Wars (2008-2012).

Between 2011 and 2015, Mumford was an Assistant Professor. He also served as an Associate Editor of Political Studies (2011-2017). Between 2015 and 2020, he was an Associate Professor. In 2020, Mumford was promoted to Professor.

Between 2020 and 2021, Mumford was a Parliamentary Office of Science and Technology (POST) Academic Fellow in the UK House of Commons International Affairs Unit.

== Works ==
=== Monographs ===
- The West’s War Against Islamic State: Operation Inherent Resolve in Syria and Iraq (Bloomsbury Publishing, 2021)
- Counterinsurgency Wars and the Anglo-American Alliance: The Special Relationship on the Rocks (Georgetown University Press, 2017)
- Proxy Warfare (John Wiley & Sons, 2013)
- The Counter-insurgency Myth: The British Experience of Irregular Warfare (Routledge, 2012)
- Puncturing the Counterinsurgency Myth: Britain and Irregular Warfare in the Past, Present, and Future (Strategic Studies Institute, U.S. Army War College, 2011)

=== Co-edtited books ===
- The Theory and Practice of Irregular Warfare: Warrior-scholarship in Counter-insurgency (Routledge, 2013), with Bruno C. Reis
- International Law, Security and Ethics: Policy Challenges in the Post-9/11 World (Routledge, 2011), with Aidan Hehir and Natasha Kuhrt
