= Lady Amanda Ellingworth =

British social worker

- Born: The Hon. Amanda Patricia Victoria Knatchbull; 26 June 1957 (age 69); London, England
- Occupation: Nonprofit executive
- Known for: Non-executive director of several NGOs
- Spouse: Charles Ellingworth (m. 1987)
- Children: 3
- Parent(s): John Knatchbull, 7th Baron Brabourne; Patricia Knatchbull, 2nd Countess Mountbatten of Burma
- Relatives: Mountbatten family; House of Windsor

Lady Amanda Patricia Victoria Ellingworth (née Knatchbull; born 26 June 1957), styled The Honourable Amanda Knatchbull between 1957 and 1979, is a British voluntary sector executive. In her early career she specialised in children's services and child protection. She has since held a portfolio of chair roles or directorships, working on behalf of vulnerable people, especially children. She is a director of Plan International, Barnardo's, Great Ormond Street Hospital, and other organisations. Her previous roles include: chair of the Caldecott Foundation, chair of The Guinness Partnership, founding chair of Guinness Care and Support, and deputy chair of Yeovil Hospital.

She is a second cousin of Charles III. The granddaughter of Admiral of the Fleet Louis Mountbatten, 1st Earl Mountbatten of Burma, she is a descendant of Queen Victoria through her daughter Princess Alice, Mountbatten's grandmother.

== Ancestry ==
Ancestors of Lady Amanda Ellingworth

8. Cecil Knatchbull-Hugessen, 4th Baron Brabourne
4. Michael Knatchbull, 5th Baron Brabourne
9. Helena von Brunningen
2. John Knatchbull, 7th Baron Brabourne
10. George Browne, 6th Marquess of Sligo
5. Lady Doreen Browne
11. Agatha Hodgson
1. Lady Amanda Ellingworth
12. Prince Louis of Battenberg
6. Louis Mountbatten, 1st Earl Mountbatten of Burma
13. Princess Victoria of Hesse and by Rhine
3. Patricia Knatchbull, 2nd Countess Mountbatten of Burma
14. Wilfrid Ashley, 1st Baron Mount Temple
7. Edwina Ashley
15. Amalia Cassel

== Early life and education ==
Born as The Honourable Amanda Patricia Victoria Knatchbull, on 26 June 1957, in London, she was the fifth of eight children of the 7th Baron Brabourne and the 2nd Countess Mountbatten of Burma. She is the granddaughter of Admiral of the Fleet the 1st Earl Mountbatten of Burma, who was an uncle of Prince Philip, Duke of Edinburgh and a second cousin once removed of Queen Elizabeth II. She has five brothers and one sister.

She was baptised by the Archbishop of Canterbury on 29 September 1957 at Mersham Parish Church in Mersham, Kent. Her godparents were Prince George of Hanover, Mrs. E. Heywood-Lonsdale, and Mrs. C. H. W. Troughton.

Ellingworth earned a BA Hons degree from the University of Kent, a CQSW qualification from Goldsmiths College, London, and a Certificate in Mandarin Language from the Beijing Language Institute.

== Career ==
After a first career in social work, Ellingworth worked at a senior level in health services, children's services, adult social care and affordable housing. She currently holds several non-executive directorships. She was chair of The Guinness Partnership, a provider of affordable housing, until March 2016.

== Personal life ==
=== Marriage and family ===
Lady Amanda married novelist and property entrepreneur Charles Vincent Ellingworth on 31 October 1987.

=== Relationship with The Prince of Wales ===
Ellingworth's grandfather Lord Mountbatten recommended her as a potential bride for his grandnephew, Charles, Prince of Wales. According to his biographer, Jonathan Dimbleby, "In 1974, following his correspondence with Mountbatten on the subject, the Prince had tentatively raised the question of marriage to Amanda with her mother (and his godmother) Patricia Brabourne. She was sympathetic, but counselled against raising the issue with her daughter, who had yet to celebrate her seventeenth birthday."

Mountbatten intended for himself and Lady Amanda to accompany Prince Charles on his planned 1980 tour of India. Both fathers disapproved and it was decided he should go alone. Before Prince Charles was to depart, Mountbatten was assassinated by the IRA in August 1979. When Prince Charles returned, he proposed to Lady Amanda. However, in addition to her maternal grandfather, she had lost her paternal grandmother and younger brother Nicholas in the attack and now recoiled from the prospect of becoming a member of the royal family.

== References and notes ==
Lines of succession
Preceded by Eleuthera Pernot de Breuil	Line of succession to the British throne descendant of Princess Alice of the United Kingdom, daughter of Queen Victoria	Succeeded by Luke Ellingworth
