= Countess Mountbatten of Burma =

Countess Mountbatten of Burma is a title in the peerage of the United Kingdom used for a female holder of the Earldom Mountbatten of Burma, or as a courtesy title for the wife of the Earl Mountbatten of Burma. The family seat for the position is at Newhouse Manor, near Ashford, Kent.

Persons who have held this title have included:

- Edwina Mountbatten, Countess Mountbatten of Burma (1901–1960), wife of Louis Mountbatten, 1st Earl Mountbatten of Burma
- Patricia Knatchbull, 2nd Countess Mountbatten of Burma (1924–2017), (Suo jure) elder daughter Louis Mountbatten, 1st Earl Mountbatten of Burma
- Penelope Knatchbull, Countess Mountbatten of Burma (b. 1953), wife of Norton Knatchbull, 3rd Earl Mountbatten of Burma
