= Earl Mountbatten of Burma =

Title in the Peerage of the United Kingdom

- Quarterly, 1st: azure, three cross-crosslets fitchée between two bendlets or (Knatchbull); 2nd: argent, two pallets sable (Mountbatten); 3rd: azure, a lion rampant double queued barry of ten argent and gules crowned or a bordure compony of the second and third (Hesse, with a bordure for difference); 4th: the Royal Arms differenced with a label of three points argent the centre point charged with a rose gules barbed vert and each of the other points with an ermine spot (Princess Alice).
- Creation date: 28 October 1947
- Created by: George VI
- Peerage: United Kingdom
- First holder: Louis Mountbatten, 1st Viscount Mountbatten of Burma
- Present holder: Norton Knatchbull, 3rd Earl
- Heir apparent: Nicholas Louis Charles Norton Knatchbull
- Remainder to: the 1st Earl's heirs male of the body lawfully begotten; the 1st Earl's daughters and heirs male of their bodies lawfully begotten
- Subsidiary titles: Viscount Mountbatten of Burma; Baron Brabourne; Baron Romsey; Baronet 'of Mersham Hatch'
- Seat: Broadlands
- Former seat: Classiebawn Castle Newhouse

Earl Mountbatten of Burma is a title in the Peerage of the United Kingdom, created in 1947 for Rear Admiral Louis Mountbatten, who in 1946 had been created the first Viscount Mountbatten of Burma. He was later promoted to Admiral of the Fleet.

The family seat is Newhouse Manor, near Ashford, Kent.

== Creation ==
The earldom was created in the Peerage of the United Kingdom on 28 October 1947 for Rear Admiral Louis Mountbatten, 1st Viscount Mountbatten of Burma.

The subsidiary titles of the earldom are Viscount Mountbatten of Burma, of Romsey in the County of Southampton (created earlier in 1946), and Baron Romsey, of Romsey in the County of Southampton (created together with the earldom in 1947). All these peerages are in the Peerage of the United Kingdom and have the same special remainder (see below).

Lord Romsey was the courtesy title by which Lady Mountbatten's eldest son and heir was known until in 2005 he succeeded his father John Knatchbull, 7th Baron Brabourne as Baron Brabourne, of Brabourne in the County of Kent. Subsequently, with the death of his mother on 13 June 2017, he became the 3rd Earl Mountbatten of Burma. As a consequence, both the Brabourne peerage and the Knatchbull baronetcy, of Mersham Hatch, in the Baronetage of England (created in 1641 for Sir Norton Knatchbull) became subsidiary titles to the earldom.

Lord Brabourne is now the courtesy title by which Lord Mountbatten's eldest son is known.

== Special remainder ==
When elevated to the peerage, the first Earl had no son, and the letters patent creating the peerages granted to him were all subject to the following special remainder, in the absence of heirs male:

...to his eldest daughter Patricia Edwina Victoria, Baroness Brabourne...and the heirs male of her body lawfully begotten; and in default of such issue to every other daughter lawfully begotten of the said Louis Francis Albert Victor Nicholas... successively in order of seniority of age and priority of birth and to the heirs male of their bodies lawfully begotten...

As a result, since the first Lord Mountbatten never had a son, his elder daughter, Patricia, succeeded as the 2nd Countess Mountbatten of Burma upon her father's death. Should the legitimate male line of descent of the 2nd Countess become extinct, the peerages would be inherited by her sister, Lady Pamela Hicks, and her legitimate heirs male. (But there are ten living male-line descendants of the 2nd Countess, as of 2024.) Should the legitimate male lines of both sisters fail, the peerages would become extinct.

While the male-line heirs of Lady Pamela Hicks are in the line of succession to the earldom, they are not in line of succession to the Barony of Brabourne. Should the 7th Baron Brabourne's line become extinct, that peerage would revert to a male-line descendant of the 1st Baron Brabourne's 3rd son.

== Earls Mountbatten of Burma (1947) ==
Created by George VI
	Name	Period	Spouse	Notes	Other titles	Arms
1	Louis Mountbatten (1900–1979)	1947–1979	married, 1922, Edwina Ashley (1900–1960)	Born a prince of Battenberg, he renounced the title and adopted the name Mountbatten	1st Viscount Mountbatten of Burma; 1st Baron Romsey	
2	Patricia Knatchbull (1924–2017)	1979–2017	married, 1946, John Knatchbull, 7th Baron Brabourne (1924–2005)	Elder daughter of the 1st Earl	2nd Viscountess Mountbatten of Burma; 2nd Baroness Romsey (1979; in her own right)	
2	Patricia Knatchbull (1924–2017)	1979–2017	married, 1946, John Knatchbull, 7th Baron Brabourne (1924–2005)	Elder daughter of the 1st Earl	Baroness Brabourne (1946; by marriage)	
3	Norton Knatchbull (born 1947)	since 2017	married, 1979, Penelope Eastwood (born 1953)	Eldest son of the 2nd Countess	3rd Viscount Mountbatten of Burma; 3rd Baron Romsey (2017; inherited from mother)	
3	Norton Knatchbull (born 1947)	since 2017	married, 1979, Penelope Eastwood (born 1953)	Eldest son of the 2nd Countess	8th Baron Brabourne; 17th Knatchbull Baronet of Mersham Hatch (2005; inherited from father)	

The heir apparent is the present holder's only son, Nicholas Louis Charles Norton Knatchbull, Lord Brabourne (born 1981).

== Line of succession ==
- Louis Mountbatten, 1st Earl Mountbatten of Burma (1900–1979)
  - Patricia Knatchbull, 2nd Countess Mountbatten of Burma (1924–2017)
    - Norton Knatchbull, 3rd Earl Mountbatten of Burma (born 1947)
      - (1) Nicholas Knatchbull, Lord Brabourne (b. 1981)
        - (2) Hon. Alexander Knatchbull (b. 2022)
    - (3) Hon. Michael Knatchbull (b. 1950)
    - (4) Hon. Philip Knatchbull (b. 1961)
      - (5) Frederick Knatchbull (b. 2003)
      - (6) John Knatchbull (b. 2004)
    - (7) Hon. Timothy Knatchbull (b. 1964)
      - (8) Milo Knatchbull (b. 2001)
      - (9) Ludovic Knatchbull (b. 2003)
  - Lady Pamela Hicks (1929–2026)
    - (10) Ashley Hicks (b. 1963)
      - (11) Caspian Hicks (b. 2018)

== Coat of arms of the 1st earl ==
Arms of The 1st Earl Mountbatten of Burma

Quarterly: 1st and 4th, azure a lion rampant double-queued barry of ten argent and gules armed and langued of the last crowned or within a bordure company of the second and third (Hesse); 2nd and 3rd, argent two pallets sable (Battenberg); charged on the honour point with an escutcheon of the arms of the late Princess Alice, namely: the royal arms differenced by a label of three points argent the centre point charged with a rose gules barbed Vert and each of the other points with an ermine spot sable. The shield is encircled with the Order of the Garter, of which the 1st earl was a member.
