= Countess of Dorset =

Countess of Dorset may refer to:

- Lady Anne Clifford, 14th Baroness de Clifford (1590–1676)
- Mary, Countess of Falmouth and Dorset (1645–1679)
- Mary Sackville, Countess of Dorset (1669–1691)
