= Nandini Chakravorty =

Indian Administrative Service officer (born 1969)

Chief Secretary, Government of West Bengal
- In office 1 January 2026 – 15 March 2026
- Appointed by: Mamata Banerjee
- Preceded by: Manoj Pant
- Succeeded by: Dushyant Nariala

Personal details
- Born: 10 June 1969 (age 57)
- Education: Lady Brabourne College; Jawaharlal Nehru University
- Occupation: Bureaucrat

Nandini Chakravorty (born 10 June 1969) is an Indian Administrative Service officer of 1994 batch (West Bengal) cadre. She had served as the Chief Secretary of West Bengal from 1 January 2026 to 15 March 2026, becomes first woman chief secretary of West Bengal.
