= Sir John Knatchbull, 2nd Baronet =

English landowner and politician

Sir John Knatchbull, 2nd Baronet (c. 1636 – 15 December 1696) was an English landowner and politician who sat in the House of Commons at various times between 1660 and 1690.

== Background ==
Knatchbull was the eldest son of Sir Norton Knatchbull, 1st Baronet and his first wife Dorothy Westrow, daughter of Thomas Westrow. Knatchbull was educated at Trinity College, Cambridge and matriculated in 1652. He was then called to the bar by the Inner Temple in 1655.

== Career ==
In April 1660, Knatchbull was elected Member of Parliament for New Romney together with his father until the following year. In 1685 he succeeded his father as baronet and was elected MP for Kent. He was re-elected MP for Kent in 1689 and 1690. In 1690, he was appointed Commissioner to the Lord Privy Seal, an office he held for the next two years.

Knatchbull died aged sixty and was buried in Mersham Hatch in Kent.

== Family ==
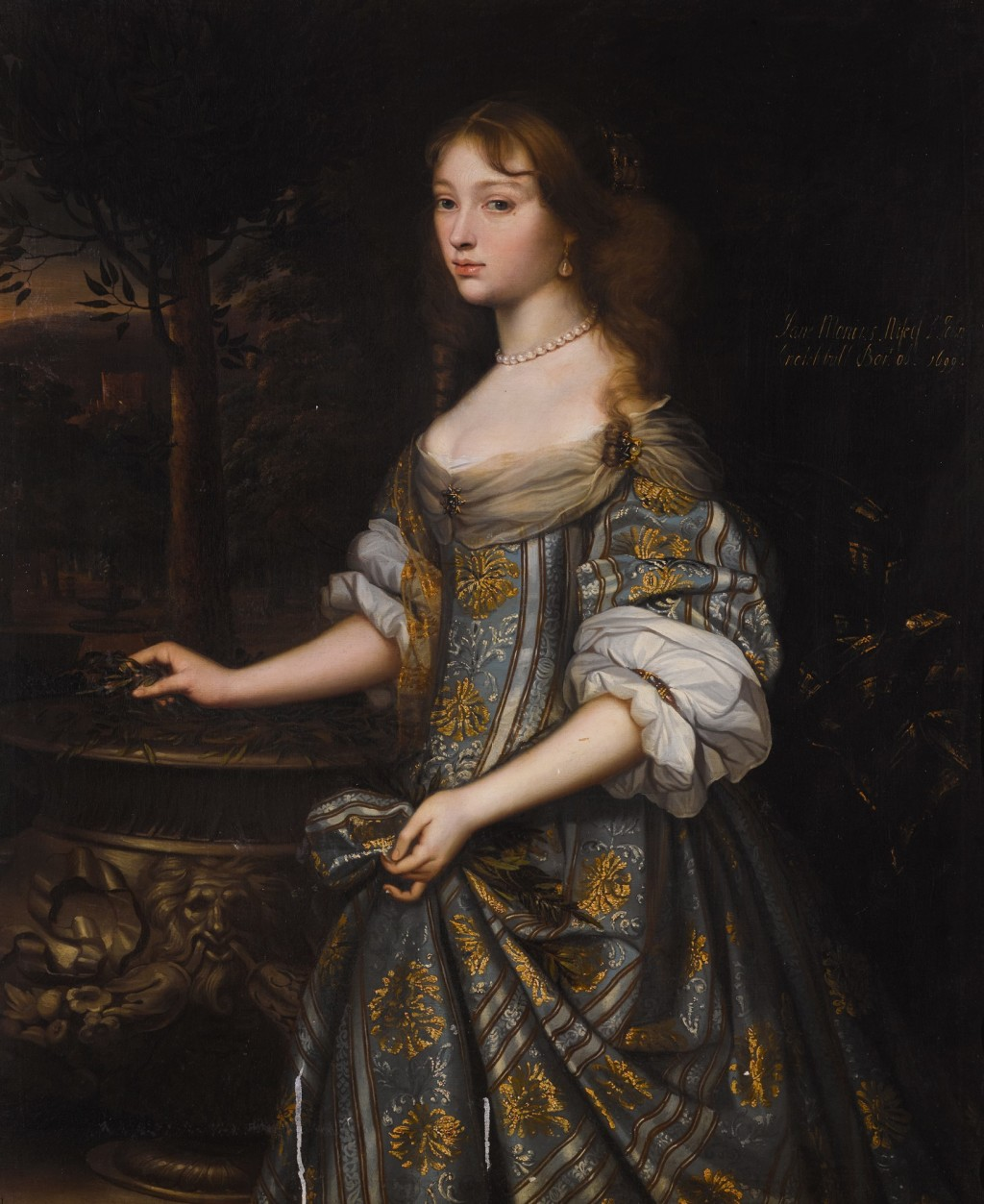
Portrait of Jane Monins, by John Michael Wright (1670)

Knatchbull married Jane Monins, daughter of Sir Edward Monins, 2nd Baronet on 17 January 1659, His sons having all predeceased him, he was succeeded in the baronetcy by his younger brother Thomas.

Parliament of England
Preceded by Rump Parliament	Member of Parliament for New Romney; 1660–1661; With: Sir Norton Knatchbull, Bt	Succeeded by Sir Norton Knatchbull, Bt; Charles Berkeley
Preceded by Sir Edward Dering; Sir Vere Fane	Member of Parliament for Kent; 1685–1695; With: Sir William Twysden 1685–1689; Sir Vere Fane 1689–1691; Sir Thomas Roberts 1691–1695	Succeeded by Philip Sydney; Sir Thomas Roberts
Baronetage of England
Preceded by Norton Knatchbull	Baronet (of Mersham Hatch); 1685–1696	Succeeded by Thomas Knatchbull
