= Norton Knatchbull (MP for Hythe) =

English Member of Parliament

The Honourable Sir Norton Knatchbull
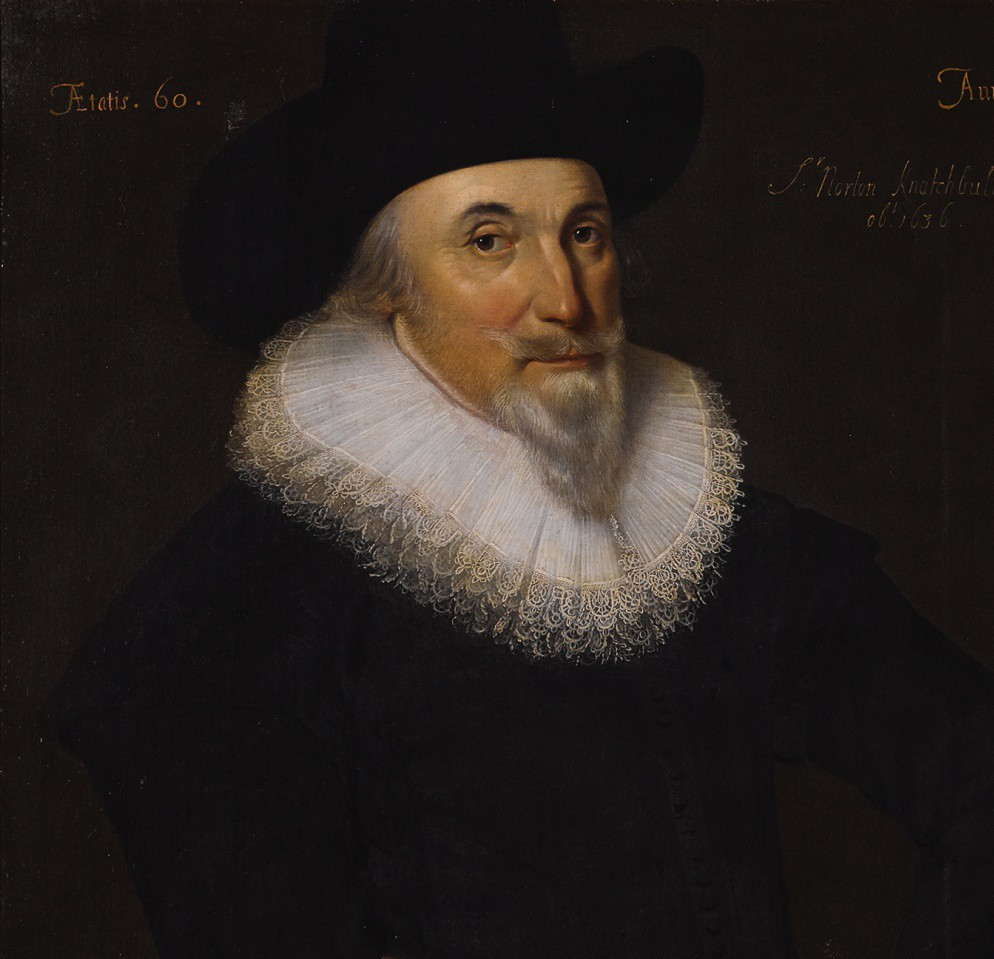
- Portrait of Sir Norton Knatchbull Bt., Gilbert Jackson

Member of Parliament for Hythe
- In office 1609–1611
- Preceded by: Sir John Smith
- Succeeded by: Sir Richard Smythe

Personal details
- Born: Before 11 September 1569
- Died: After 3 December 1636 (aged 67)
- Resting place: church of St. John the Baptist, Mersham; 51.1169°N 0.931405°E
- Spouses: Anne Wentworth (m. 1591; died 1591) Bridget Astley (m. 1592; died 1625) Mary Aldersey (m. 1627)
- Parents: Richard Knatchbull; Susan Greene
- Education: St John's College, Cambridge

Sir Norton Knatchbull (baptised 11 September 1569 – after 3 December 1636), of Mersham Hatch, Kent, was an English landowner and politician. He was a Member of the Parliament of England (MP) for the seat of Hythe in 1609. He was knighted in 1604.

== Early life ==
Knatchbull was the 3rd son of Richard Knatchbull (d. 1582) of Mersham Hatch, and Susan Greene, daughter of Thomas Greene of Bobbing, Kent. He was baptised on 11 September 1569.

He was a student at St John's College, Cambridge in 1586 and was admitted to the Middle Temple in 1588.

== Marriages ==
Knatchbull married three times, but had no children by any of his wives. He married:

- first: in October 1591, Anne Wentworth (baptised 16 September 1565 – October 1591), daughter of Paul Wentworth (d. 1593) of Burnham, Buckinghamshire and Helen Agmondesham. She died in the same month as the wedding and was buried on 19 October 1591 at Burnham.

On a small plate of brass over her tomb, are the following lines:

Knatchbulli conjux, Wenthworthi septima proles, Tempora post vitae bis duodena suae, Anne immaturo commisit membra sepulchro Et quo nupta fuit mense, sepulto fuit.

- second: by August 1592, Bridget Astley (d. 4 November 1625), daughter of John Astley (d. 1596) of Maidstone, Kent, Master of the Jewel House, from 1558 to 1596. Bridget's sister, Eleanor, married her husband's brother, Thomas.
- third: after 9 February 1627, Mary Aldersey, daughter and coheir of John Aldersey (d. 1614), haberdasher, of London, widow of Thomas Westrowe, alderman and grocer of Cornhill, London.
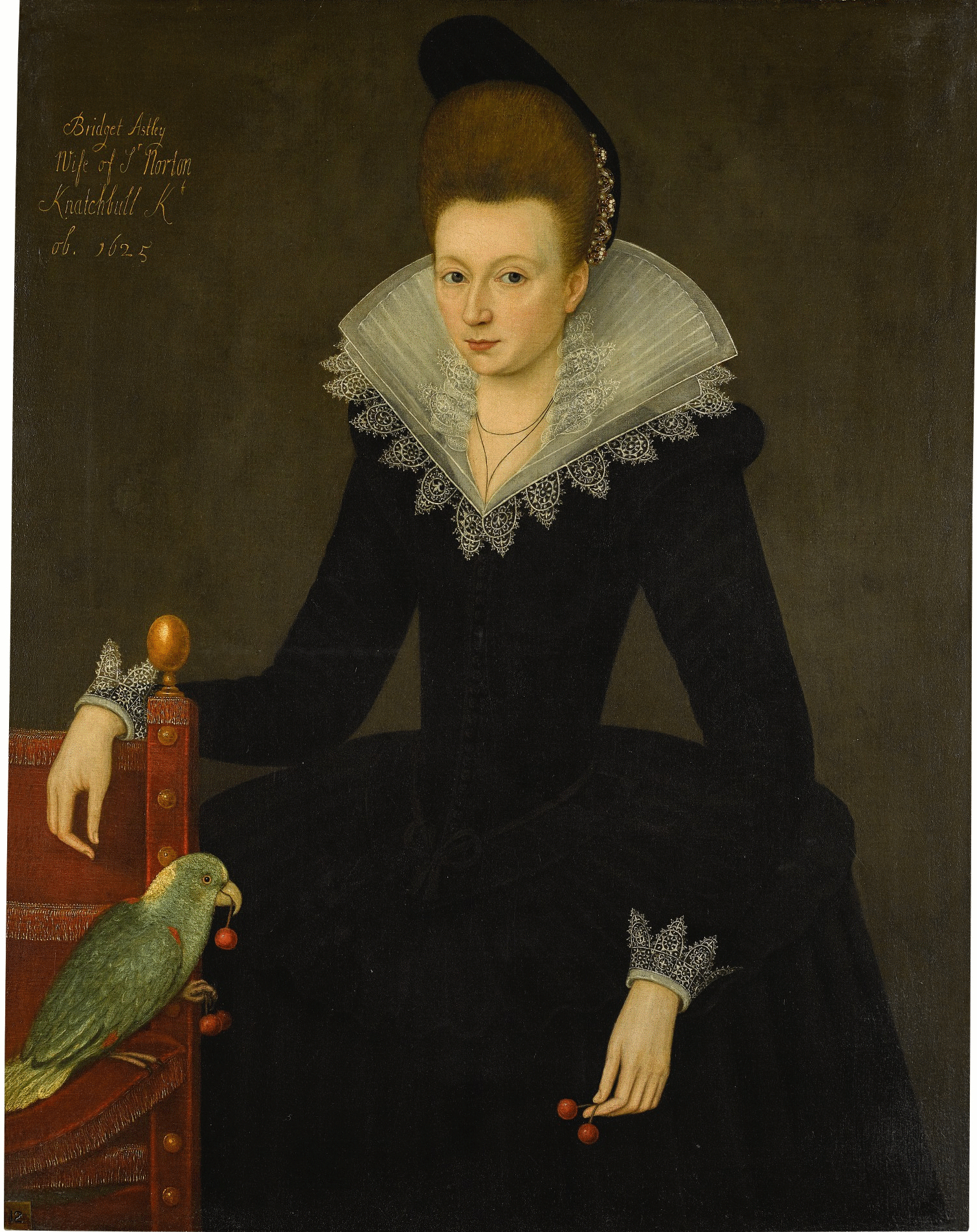
Bridget Astley, Lady Knatchbull, Circle of Robert Peake the Elder

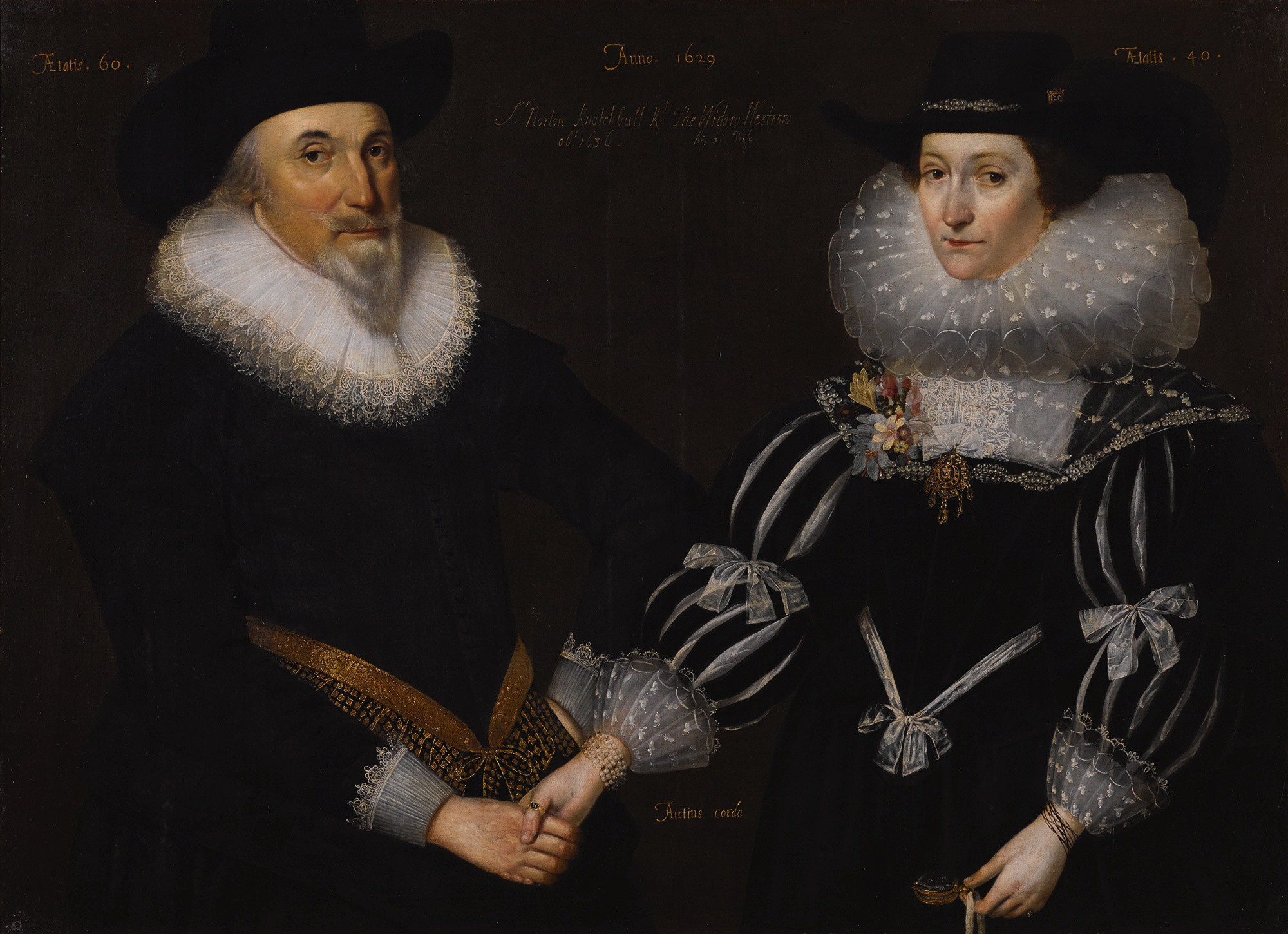
Portrait of Sir Norton Knatchbull Bt. (1569-1636), and his wife Mary Westrow, née Aldersey (d. 1674), 1629, Gilbert Jackson

== Career ==
He was a justice of the peace (JP) for Kent, serving from 1600 to about 1627. He was knighted at Whitehall on 18 April 1604, and licensed in the following August to travel abroad for a year. He served as Sheriff of Kent from 1606 to 1607.

He was elected MP for the seat of Hythe on 4 October 1609, after a by-election, but did not stand for re-election.

== Death ==
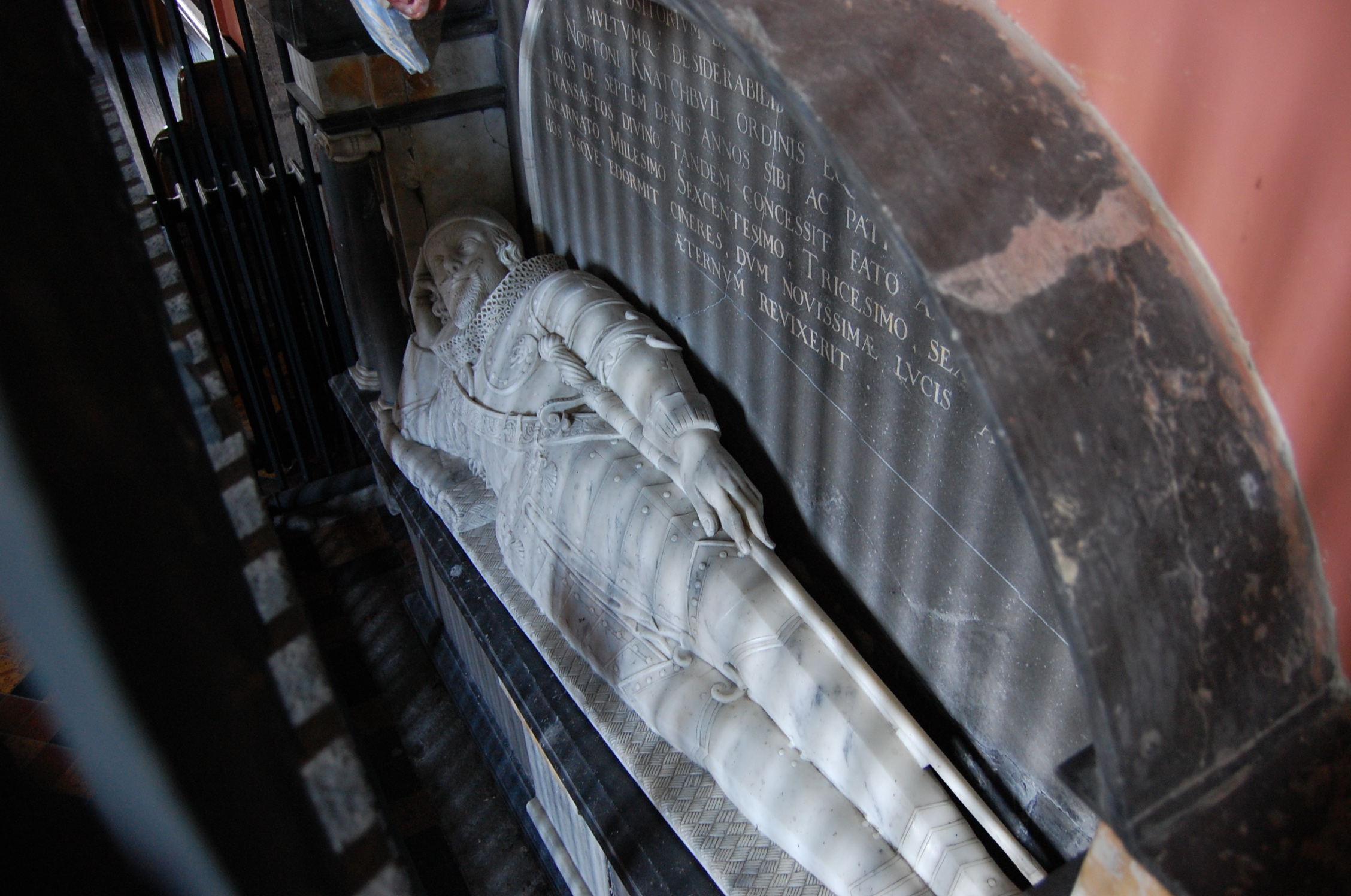
Effigy of Sir Norton Knatchbull, church of St. John the Baptist, Mersham

He died shortly after 3 December, and was buried on 9 December 1636 at the church of St. John the Baptist, Mersham. A monument, which included a life-sized effigy in marble, was erected by his nephew and heir, Norton, at the north wall of the chancel. His widow subsequently married Sir Edward Scott of Scot's Hall, Kent, in 1639.
