= Baron Brabourne =

British nobility

Barony of Brabourne
- Arms of Norton Knatchbull, 3rd Earl Mountbatten of Burma, 8th Baron Brabourne (whose mother was the daughter and heiress of Louis Mountbatten, 1st Earl Mountbatten of Burma) and descendants: Quarterly, 1st: azure, three cross-crosslets fitchée between two bendlets or (Knatchbull); 2nd: argent, two pallets sable (Mountbatten); 3rd: azure, a lion rampant double queued barry of ten argent and gules crowned or a bordure compony of the second and third (Hesse, with a bordure for difference); 4th: the Royal Arms differenced with a label of three points argent the centre point charged with a rose gules barbed vert and each of the other points with an ermine spot (Princess Alice).
- Creation date: 26 May 1880
- Created by: Queen Victoria
- Peerage: Peerage of the United Kingdom
- First holder: Edward Knatchbull-Hugessen
- Present holder: Norton Knatchbull, 3rd Earl Mountbatten of Burma
- Heir apparent: Nicholas Knatchbull
- Remainder to: The 1st Baron's heirs male of his body, lawfully begotten
- Seat: Broadlands

Baron Brabourne, of Brabourne in the County of Kent, is a title in the Peerage of the United Kingdom. It was created in 1880 for the Liberal politician Edward Knatchbull-Hugessen, the second son of Sir Edward Knatchbull, 9th Baronet, of Mersham Hatch. He had previously represented Sandwich in the House of Commons and served as Under-Secretary of State for Home Affairs and Under-Secretary of State for the Colonies. Lord Brabourne had assumed by Royal licence the additional surname of Hugessen (which was that of his maternal grandmother) in 1849. His son, the second Baron, represented Rochester in Parliament as a Liberal.

In 1917, his younger brother, the fourth Baron, who had succeeded his nephew the third Baron in 1915, inherited the Baronetcy of Mersham Hatch. Since then, the titles have remained merged. The fourth Baron was succeeded by his son, the fifth Baron. He was the Conservative Member of Parliament for Ashford, Governor of Bombay and Governor of Bengal. In 1919, Lord Brabourne assumed by deed poll the surname of Knatchbull only.

His eldest son, the sixth Baron, was killed in the Second World War, when the title passed to the latter's younger brother, the seventh Baron. He was a film and television producer. In 1946, he married Patricia Mountbatten, daughter of the naval commander Viscount Mountbatten (later the 1st Earl Mountbatten of Burma). Their son, the eighth Baron, who succeeded in 2005, is also the Earl Mountbatten of Burma (since 2017). This means that the Barony of Brabourne is held jointly by the current and future Earls Mountbatten of Burma descended only from male lines of the 2nd Countess Mountbatten of Burma and her husband, the 7th Baron Brabourne. Should that male line become extinct, the titles will then separate or become extinct, depending on collateral male lines existing from previous holders of the titles.

The Baronetcy, of Mersham Hatch in the County of Kent, was created in the Baronetage of England in 1641 for Sir Norton Knatchbull, who represented Kent and New Romney in the House of Commons. His son, the second Baronet, also represented these constituencies in Parliament. His nephew, the fourth Baronet (who had succeeded his father, a younger brother of the second Baronet), sat as Member of Parliament for Rochester, Kent and Lostwithiel. He was succeeded by his son, the fifth Baronet, who served as High Sheriff of Kent in 1733. In 1746, he assumed by private act of the Parliament of Ireland the additional surname of Wyndham, pursuant to the will of his mother's father, Thomas Wyndham, 1st Baron Wyndham. His son, the sixth Baronet, represented Kent in Parliament. On his death, the title passed to his uncle, the seventh Baronet. He sat in the Irish House of Commons as representative for Armagh. His son, the eighth Baronet, was High Sheriff of Kent in 1785 and later represented Kent in the House of Commons.

He was succeeded by his son, the ninth Baronet, whose daughter married Edward Knight, the nephew of Jane Austen. He represented both Kent and East Kent in Parliament and notably served as Paymaster General in the Tory administrations of Sir Robert Peel. His grandson, the twelfth Baronet, briefly represented East Kent in the House of Commons. On his death in 1917, he was succeeded by his first cousin, the 4th Baron Brabourne, who became the thirteenth Baronet of Mersham Hatch as well.

The 8th Baron Brabourne inherited the peerage of Earl Mountbatten of Burma upon the death of his mother, Patricia Knatchbull, 2nd Countess Mountbatten of Burma, on 13 June 2017. As a consequence, the Barony of Brabourne, as well the Knatchbull Baronetcy, became subsidiary titles to that of the earldom.

The title of the barony is pronounced "Bray-burn". The family seat is Broadlands, near Romsey, Hampshire.

== Knatchbull Baronets, of Mersham Hatch (1641) ==
Arms of Knatchbull (Knatchbull of Mersham Hatch, Kent, Knatchbull baronets): Azure, three crosses-crosslet fitchée bendwise between two bendlets or

- Sir Norton Knatchbull, 1st Baronet (c. 1602–1685)
- Sir John Knatchbull, 2nd Baronet (c. 1636–1696)
- Sir Thomas Knatchbull, 3rd Baronet (d. 1712)
- Sir Edward Knatchbull, 4th Baronet (d. 1730)
- Sir Wyndham Knatchbull-Wyndham, 5th Baronet (1699–1749)
- Sir Wyndham Knatchbull-Wyndham, 6th Baronet (1737–1763)
- Sir Edward Knatchbull, 7th Baronet (1704–1789)
- Sir Edward Knatchbull, 8th Baronet (c. 1760–1819)
- Sir Edward Knatchbull, 9th Baronet (1781–1849)
- Sir Norton Joseph Knatchbull, 10th Baronet (1808–1868)
- Sir Edward Knatchbull, 11th Baronet (1838–1871)
- Sir Wyndham Knatchbull, 12th Baronet (1844–1917)
- Cecil Marcus Knatchbull-Hugessen, 4th Baron Brabourne and 13th Baronet (1863–1933)

for further succession, see below

== Barons Brabourne (1880) ==
Arms of Knatchbull-Hugessen: Quarterly: 1st and 4th, argent, on a mount vert two boars erect respecting each other sable, their forelegs resting against an oak tree proper (Hugessen); 2nd and 3rd, azure, three crosses-crosslet fitchée bendwise between two bendlets or (Knatchbull)

- Edward Hugessen Knatchbull-Hugessen, 1st Baron Brabourne (1829–1893)
- Edward Knatchbull-Hugessen, 2nd Baron Brabourne (1857–1909)
- Wyndham Wentworth Knatchbull-Hugessen, 3rd Baron Brabourne (1885–1915)
- Cecil Marcus Knatchbull-Hugessen, 4th Baron Brabourne (1863–1933)
- Michael Herbert Rudolf Knatchbull, 5th Baron Brabourne (1895–1939)
- Norton Cecil Michael Knatchbull, 6th Baron Brabourne (1922–1943)
- John Ulick Knatchbull, 7th Baron Brabourne (1924–2005)
- Norton Louis Philip Knatchbull, 3rd Earl Mountbatten of Burma and 8th Baron Brabourne (born 1947)

The heir apparent is the present holder's only son, Nicholas Knatchbull, Lord Brabourne (born 1981).

== Family tree ==
Edward Hugessen; Knatchbull-Hugessen; 1st Baron Brabourne (1829–1893)
Edward; Knatchbull-Hugessen; 2nd Baron Brabourne (1857–1909)	Cecil Marcus; Knatchbull-Hugessen; 4th Baron Brabourne (1863–1933)	Louis Alexander; Mountbatten; 1st Marquess of Milford Haven (1854–1921)
Wyndham Wentworth; Knatchbull; 3rd Baron Brabourne (1885–1915)	Michael Herbert Rudolf; Knatchbull-Hugessen; 5th Baron Brabourne (1895–1939)	Louis Francis Albert; Victor Nicholas George; Mountbatten; 1st Earl Mountbatten of Burma (1900–1979)
Norton Cecil Michael; Knatchbull; 6th Baron Brabourne (1922–1943)	John Ulick; Knatchbull; 7th Baron Brabourne (1924–2005)	Patricia Edwina Victoria; Knatchbull suo jure 2nd Countess Mountbatten of Burma (1924–2017)
Norton Louis Philip Knatchbull; 3rd Earl Mountbatten of Burma; 8th Baron Brabourne (born 1947)
Nicholas Louis Charles; Norton Knatchbull; Lord Brabourne (born 1981)

== Line of Succession ==
- Edward Knatchbull-Hugessen, 1st Baron Brabourne (1829-1993)
  - Edward Knatchbull-Hugessen, 2nd Baron Brabourne (1957–1909)
    - Wyndham Wentworth Knatchbull, 3rd Baron Brabourne (1885–1915)
  - Cecil Marcus Knatchbull-Hugessen, 4th Baron Brabourne(1863–1933)
    - Michael Herbert Rudolf Knatchbull-Hugessen 5th Baron Brabourne(1895–1939)
      - Norton Cecil Michael Knatchbull 6th Baron Brabourne, (1922–1943)
      - John Ulick Knatchbull, 7th Baron Brabourne (1924–2005)
        - Norton Knatchbull, 3rd Earl Mountbatten of Burma (born 1947)
          - (1) Nicholas Knatchbull, Lord Brabourne (b. 1981)
            - (2) The Hon. Alexander Knatchbull (b. 2022)
        - (3) The Hon. Michael Knatchbull (b. 1950)
        - (4) The Hon. Philip Knatchbull (b. 1961)
          - (5) Frederick Knatchbull (b. 2003)
          - (6) John Knatchbull (b. 2004)
        - (7) The Hon. Timothy Knatchbull (b. 1964)
          - (8) Milo Knatchbull (b. 2001)
          - (9) Ludovic Knatchbull (b. 2003)
  - Adrian Norton Knatchbull-Hugessen (1891–1976)
    - Edward Herrick Knatchbull-Hugessen (1923–1955)
      - male issue in remainder
    - Kenneth Wyndham Knatchbull-Hugessen (1925–1942)
      - male issue in remainder
    - Andrew John Knatchbull-Hugessen (b. 1926)
      - male issue in remainder
    - James Cornelius Knatchbull-Hugessen (b. 1933)
      - male issue in remainder

== Coats of arms ==
=== Arms of the 1st to 7th Barons Brabourne ===
Arms: Quarterly 1st & 4th, Argent, on a Mount Vert, two Boar's erect respectant Sable, their forelegs resting against an Oak Tree proper (Hugessen); 2nd & 3rd, Azure, in bend three Crosses-Crosslet fitchée between two Bendlets Or (Knatchbull); Crests: 1st, An Oak Tree proper, between two Wings elevated, pinions Azure, feathered Or (Hugessen); 2nd: On a Chapeau Gules, turned up Ermine, an Ounce statant Ermine, spotted Sable (Knatchbull); Supporters: On either side a Leopard Argent, pelletée, gorged with a Wreath of Oak Vert, fructed Gold, holding in the mouth a Cross-Crosslet fitchée Or; Motto: IN CRUCIFIXA GLORIA MEA (My Glory is in the Cross).

=== Arms of the 8th Baron Brabourne ===
Granted by Royal Licence in 1966 to the Earls Mountbatten of Burma who descend from the 1st Earl Mountbatten of Burma's elder daughter, Patricia, wife of the 7th Baron Brabourne.

Arms: Quarterly 1st, Azure, in bend three Crosses-Crosslet fitchée between two Bendlets Or (Knatchbull); 2nd, Argent, two Pellets Sable (Mountbatten); 3rd, Azure, a Lion rampant double queued barry of ten Argent and Gules, crowned Or, within a Bordure compony Gules and Argent (Hesse); 4th, The Royal Arms differenced by a Label of three-points Argent, the centre point charged with a Rose Gules, and the outer points with an Ermine Spot Sable (Princess Alice); Crests: 1st, On a Chapeau Gules, turned up Ermine, an Ounce statant Ermine, spotted Sable (Knatchbull); 2nd, Out of a Ducal Coronet Or, a Plume of Ostrich Feathers alternately Argent and Sable (Mountbatten); 3rd, Out of a Ducal Coronet Or, two Horns barry of ten Argent and Gules, issuing from each three Linden Leaves Vert, and from the outer side of each horn four Branches barwise having three like Leaves pendent therefrom Vert (Hesse); Supporters: On either side a Lion double queued and crowned all Or; Mottoes: 1st, IN CRUCIFIXA GLORIA MEA (My Glory is in the Cross)(Knatchbull); 2nd, IN HONOUR BOUND (Mountbatten).

== See also ==
- Earl Mountbatten of Burma
- Marquess of Milford Haven
