= Listed buildings in Mersham =

Historic structures in Kent, England

Mersham is a village and civil parish in the Borough of Ashford of Kent, England. It contains three grade I, six grade II* and 65 grade II listed buildings that are recorded in the National Heritage List for England.

This list is based on the information retrieved online from Historic England.

== Key ==
Grade	Criteria
I	Buildings that are of exceptional interest
II*	Particularly important buildings of more than special interest
II	Buildings that are of special interest

== Listing ==
Name	Grade	Location	Type	Completed (Note: The date given is the date used by Historic England as significant for the initial building or that of an important part in the structure's description.)	Date designated	Grid ref. (Note: The grid reference is based on the British national grid reference system, sometimes known as OSGB36, used by the Ordnance Survey.) Geo-coordinates	Notes	Entry number (Note: The "List Entry Number" is a unique number assigned to each listed building and scheduled monument by Historic England.)	Image	Wikidata
Stone Green Farm	II	TN25 7HE			16 February 1989	TR0457638505; 51°06′34″N 0°55′16″E		1233506	Upload Photo	Q26526969
Little Swanton	II	Blind Lane			16 February 1989	TR0430539695; 51°07′12″N 0°55′05″E		1233273	Upload Photo	Q26526751
Loud House	II	Blind Lane			16 February 1989	TR0460439765; 51°07′14″N 0°55′20″E		1233274	Upload Photo	Q26526752
Bower Farmhouse	II*	Bower Road			27 November 1957	TR0565439388; 51°07′01″N 0°56′13″E		1276692	Upload Photo	Q17556823
The Stables	II	Bower Road, TN25 6NJ			16 February 1989	TR0526539754; 51°07′13″N 0°55′54″E		1276327	Upload Photo	Q26565844
Barn and Attached Cowshed at Cheeseman's Green Farm	II	Cheeseman's Green Lane, TN25 7HY			22 February 2018	TR0295738875; 51°06′48″N 0°53′54″E		1452767	Upload Photo	Q66479324
Cheeseman's Green Farmhouse	II	Cheeseman's Green Lane, TN25 7HY			22 February 2018	TR0293938860; 51°06′47″N 0°53′53″E		1451263	Upload Photo	Q66479140
Mundy Farmhouse	II	Cheesemans Green			16 February 1989	TR0308538715; 51°06′42″N 0°54′00″E		1233276	Upload Photo	Q26526754
Mundy Manor	II	Cheesemans Green			27 November 1957	TR0309838613; 51°06′39″N 0°54′00″E		1233275	Upload Photo	Q26526753
Chequer Tree Farmhouse	II	Chequertree			16 February 1989	TR0344837331; 51°05′57″N 0°54′16″E		1233526	Upload Photo	Q26526986
Barn About 30 Metres North West of Mersham Manor	II*	Church Road			16 February 1989	TR0515839414; 51°07′02″N 0°55′48″E		1233497	Upload Photo	Q17556612
Bridge House	II	Church Road			16 February 1989	TR0501639401; 51°07′02″N 0°55′40″E		1276697	Upload Photo	Q26566192
Chest Tomb to Jane Morris (?) About 1 Metre South of Church of St John	II	Church Road			16 February 1989	TR0525239362; 51°07′00″N 0°55′53″E		1276631	Upload Photo	Q26566131
Church of St John the Baptist	I	Church Road			27 November 1957	TR0526239374; 51°07′01″N 0°55′53″E		1276693	Church of St John the Baptist More images	Q17529416
Headstone to George Blechynden, About 4 Metres South East of Church of St John	II	About 4 Metres South East Of Church Of St John, Church Road			16 February 1989	TR0526239358; 51°07′00″N 0°55′53″E		1276694	Upload Photo	Q26566189
Mersham Manor	I	Church Road			27 November 1957	TR0521439386; 51°07′01″N 0°55′51″E		1233281	Upload Photo	Q17529398
Sundial 5 Metres South of Church of St John	II	Church Road			16 February 1989	TR0524339361; 51°07′00″N 0°55′52″E		1276638	Upload Photo	Q26566136
Tomb Chest to Elizabeth Mantel, About 20 Metres South of Church of St John	II	About 20 Metres South Of Church Of St John, Church Road			16 February 1989	TR0525539343; 51°07′00″N 0°55′53″E		1233473	Upload Photo	Q26526938
Two Rows of 3 and 5 Headstones About 5 to 15 Metres South of Church of St John	II	Church Road			16 February 1989	TR0524539349; 51°07′00″N 0°55′52″E		1276695	Upload Photo	Q26566190
Denne and Projecting Walls	II	Flood Street			27 November 1957	TR0466838894; 51°06′46″N 0°55′22″E		1276579	Upload Photo	Q26566083
Long Row	II	Flood Street			16 February 1989	TR0468638675; 51°06′39″N 0°55′22″E		1233288	Upload Photo	Q26526764
Stonegreen Cottage	II	Flood Street			16 February 1989	TR0468738332; 51°06′28″N 0°55′21″E		1233284	Upload Photo	Q26526760
Stonegreen Hall	II*	Flood Street			13 October 1952	TR0469938350; 51°06′28″N 0°55′22″E		1233498	Upload Photo	Q17556643
Gill Cottage	II	Gill Lane			16 February 1989	TR0346638239; 51°06′26″N 0°54′19″E		1233686	Upload Photo	Q26527135
Little Gill Farmhouse	II	Gill Lane			16 February 1989	TR0339238106; 51°06′22″N 0°54′14″E		1276500	Upload Photo	Q26566007
Mulberry House	II	Gill Lane, TN25 7HZ			16 February 1989	TR0358038309; 51°06′28″N 0°54′25″E		1276581	Upload Photo	Q26566084
Barn About 75 Metres South East of Quarrington	II	Hinxhill Road			16 February 1989	TR0591041240; 51°08′00″N 0°56′30″E		1233694	Upload Photo	Q26527143
Bockham Farm Cottage	II	Hinxhill Road			16 February 1989	TR0525441427; 51°08′07″N 0°55′57″E		1233696	Upload Photo	Q26527145
Gains Cottage	II	Hinxhill Road			27 November 1957	TR0617141184; 51°07′58″N 0°56′43″E		1276469	Upload Photo	Q26565978
Oasthouse About 75 Metres South East of Quarrington	II	Hinxhill Road			16 February 1989	TR0593541253; 51°08′01″N 0°56′31″E		1233695	Upload Photo	Q26527144
Quarrington	II	Hinxhill Road			27 November 1957	TR0588441310; 51°08′03″N 0°56′29″E		1233688	Upload Photo	Q26527137
Sheds, About 50 Metres South East of Quarrington	II	About 50 Metres South East Of Quarrington, Hinxhill Road			16 February 1989	TR0592541274; 51°08′01″N 0°56′31″E		1233692	Upload Photo	Q26527141
Stable Block About 50 Metres South East of Quarrington with Wall Attached	II	Hinxhill Road			16 February 1989	TR0589341255; 51°08′01″N 0°56′29″E		1233690	Upload Photo	Q26527139
Wall About 10 to 20 Metres South and East of Quarrington	II	Hinxhill Road			16 February 1989	TR0590741292; 51°08′02″N 0°56′30″E		1233689	Upload Photo	Q26527138
Hatch Lodge	II	Hythe Road			16 February 1989	TR0565840254; 51°07′29″N 0°56′15″E		1276485	Upload Photo	Q26565993
Mersham Le Hatch	I	Hythe Road			13 October 1952	TR0603240390; 51°07′33″N 0°56′35″E		1233748	Mersham Le Hatch More images	Q17529403
Milestone at Tr 045 412	II	Hythe Road			16 February 1989	TR0450641206; 51°08′01″N 0°55′18″E		1276471	Upload Photo	Q26565980
Barn/garage About 20 Metres West of Redbur	II	Kingsford Street			16 February 1989	TR0477440774; 51°07′47″N 0°55′31″E		1233753	Upload Photo	Q26527200
Flanders House	II	Kingsford Street			16 February 1989	TR0519639901; 51°07′18″N 0°55′51″E		1233758	Upload Photo	Q26527205
Kingsford Hall	II	Kingsford Street			16 February 1989	TR0481040550; 51°07′39″N 0°55′32″E		1233751	Upload Photo	Q26527198
Longthorne Farmhouse	II	Kingsford Street			16 February 1989	TR0483440425; 51°07′35″N 0°55′33″E		1276460	Upload Photo	Q26565970
Ransley Cottage	II	Kingsford Street			16 February 1989	TR0473140883; 51°07′50″N 0°55′29″E		1233755	Upload Photo	Q26527202
Redbur	II	Kingsford Street			16 February 1989	TR0478440755; 51°07′46″N 0°55′31″E		1276462	Upload Photo	Q26565972
The Old Gate House Including Attached Raised Footway	II	Kingsford Street			16 February 1989	TR0526739866; 51°07′17″N 0°55′54″E		1233759	Upload Photo	Q26527206
Winser Cottage	II	Kingsford Street			16 February 1989	TR0510539920; 51°07′19″N 0°55′46″E		1233756	Upload Photo	Q26527203
Stonelees	II*	Laws Lane			27 November 1957	TR0450837281; 51°05′54″N 0°55′10″E		1233761	Upload Photo	Q17556666
7 and 8 Long Row	II	7 and 8, Long Row, Flood Street, TN25 7HD			16 February 1989	TR0469438710; 51°06′40″N 0°55′23″E		1233509	Upload Photo	Q26526972
Stable Block and Gardeners Cottage, Newhouse	II	Newhouse, The Street			16 February 1989	TR0540639970; 51°07′20″N 0°56′02″E		1234049	Upload Photo	Q26527475
Hannover Mill, Outbuildings and Mill	II	Outbuildings And Mill, The Forstal			16 February 1989	TR0495239091; 51°06′52″N 0°55′37″E		1233522	Upload Photo	Q26526983
Elm Tree Farmhouse	II	South Stour			13 October 1952	TR0403538476; 51°06′33″N 0°54′48″E		1233766	Upload Photo	Q26527212
Mill House Swanton Mill	II*	South Stour			27 November 1957	TR0388438856; 51°06′46″N 0°54′41″E		1276466	Upload Photo	Q17556789
Outhouse, About 25 Metres South of Swanton Mill	II	About 25 Metres South Of Swanton Mill, South Stour			16 February 1989	TR0387438825; 51°06′45″N 0°54′41″E		1233992	Upload Photo	Q26527424
The Grange	II	South Stour			16 February 1989	TR0358538484; 51°06′34″N 0°54′25″E		1234023	Upload Photo	Q26527450
Outbuilding About 50 Metres North of Stone Green Farm	II	Stone Green Farm, TN25 7HE			16 February 1989	TR0459238528; 51°06′34″N 0°55′17″E		1276571	Upload Photo	Q26566075
Stables About 20 Metres North East of Stone Green Farm	II	Stone Green Farm, TN25 7HE			16 February 1989	TR0460538508; 51°06′34″N 0°55′18″E		1276698	Upload Photo	Q26566193
The Oast and Attached Wall	II	Stone Green Farm, TN25 7HE			16 February 1989	TR0461838492; 51°06′33″N 0°55′18″E		1233287	Upload Photo	Q26526763
Bell House	II	The Forstal			27 November 1957	TR0499339191; 51°06′55″N 0°55′39″E		1233520	Upload Photo	Q26526981
Brook Cottage	II	The Forstal			16 February 1989	TR0481239090; 51°06′52″N 0°55′29″E		1233524	Upload Photo	Q26526985
Goodrich Cottage	II	The Forstal			16 February 1989	TR0491039196; 51°06′55″N 0°55′35″E		1233657	Upload Photo	Q26527111
Stables/outbuildings About 5 to 20 Metres South and West of the Farriers Arms	II	The Forstal			16 February 1989	TR0488039109; 51°06′53″N 0°55′33″E		1276525	Upload Photo	Q26566031
The Farriers Arms	II	The Forstal			16 February 1989	TR0489739120; 51°06′53″N 0°55′34″E		1233523	Upload Photo	Q26526984
15, the Street	II	15, The Street			16 February 1989	TR0527239840; 51°07′16″N 0°55′55″E		1234028	Upload Photo	Q26527455
16 and 16a, the Street	II	16 and 16a, The Street			16 February 1989	TR0527839848; 51°07′16″N 0°55′55″E		1234077	Upload Photo	Q26527500
Bower Cottages	II	1, 2 and 3, The Street			16 February 1989	TR0527239770; 51°07′14″N 0°55′54″E		1234027	Upload Photo	Q26527454
Burgate	II	The Street			16 February 1989	TR0529839891; 51°07′17″N 0°55′56″E		1234030	Upload Photo	Q26527457
Chestnut Villas	II	1, 2 and 3, The Street			16 February 1989	TR0528039787; 51°07′14″N 0°55′55″E		1234025	Upload Photo	Q26527452
Coachhouse and Garden Walls Attached, About 10 Metres to East and South of Burgate	II	About 10 Metres To East And South Of Burgate, The Street			16 February 1989	TR0531739896; 51°07′18″N 0°55′57″E		1234031	Upload Photo	Q26527458
Garden Walls to West and North West of Newhouse	II	The Street			16 February 1989	TR0542540019; 51°07′21″N 0°56′03″E		1234024	Upload Photo	Q26527451
Glebe House and Wall Attached	II	The Street			27 November 1957	TR0535939994; 51°07′21″N 0°55′59″E		1034444	Upload Photo	Q26285985
Hatch Cottage Little Hatch	II	The Street			20 April 1976	TR0532339903; 51°07′18″N 0°55′57″E		1234032	Upload Photo	Q26527459
K6 Telephone Kiosk	II	The Street			16 April 2009	TR0527839801; 51°07′15″N 0°55′55″E		1393295	Upload Photo	Q26672469
Mersham Stores, Post Office and Hollyhock Cottage	II	9, The Street, TN25 6NA			16 February 1989	TR0524939769; 51°07′14″N 0°55′53″E		1234067	Upload Photo	Q26527491
Newhouse	II*	The Street			13 October 1952	TR0545039970; 51°07′20″N 0°56′04″E		1276324	Upload Photo	Q17556752
The Royal Oak and House/office Attached	II	The Street			16 February 1989	TR0526639821; 51°07′15″N 0°55′54″E		1234070	Upload Photo	Q26527494

== See also ==
- Grade I listed buildings in Kent
- Grade II* listed buildings in Kent

== Sources ==
- Newman, John (2012) [1969], Kent: West and the Weald, The Buildings of England, New Haven and London: Yale University Press, ISBN 978-0-300-18509-6
