= Sir Thomas Roberts, 4th Baronet =

English politician

Sir Thomas Roberts, 4th Baronet (2 December 1658 – 20 November 1706) was an English politician who sat in the House of Commons between 1691 and 1702.

Roberts was the son of Sir Howland Roberts, 3rd Baronet of Glassenbury, Kent and his wife Bridget Jocelyn daughter of Sir Robert Jocelyn of Hyde Hall, Sawbridgeworth. He succeeded his father in the baronetcy in infancy on 30 November 1661. He was educated by private tutor Rev. Thomas Brand who was one of the dissenting divines who found refuge at the house of his mother. He then went to St Catharine's College, Cambridge. He was sympathetic to Dissenters and was a commissioner of the inquiry into recusancy fines in 1688. Also in 1688 he became a Deputy Lieutenant and J.P.

Roberts was elected Member of Parliament (MP) for Kent on 16 November 1691 and held the seat until 11 November 1695. He was elected MP for Maidstone on 17 July 1702 but his election was declared void on 8 December 1702. He contested Maidstone unsuccessfully in 1704.

Roberts married Jane Beale, daughter of Sir John Beale, 1st Baronet on 31 May 1683.

Parliament of England
Preceded by Hon. Sir Vere Fane; Sir John Knatchbull, Bt	Member of Parliament for Kent with Sir John Knatchbull, Bt; 1691–1695	Succeeded by Sir James Oxenden, Bt; Sir Stephen Lennard, Bt
Preceded by Sir Robert Marsham, Bt; Thomas Bliss	Member of Parliament for Maidstone; 1702	Vacant Writ suspended
Baronetage of England
Preceded by Howland Roberts	Baronet (of Glassenbury); 1661–1706	Succeeded by Thomas Roberts
