= Lady Brabourne College =

Women's college in Kolkata, India

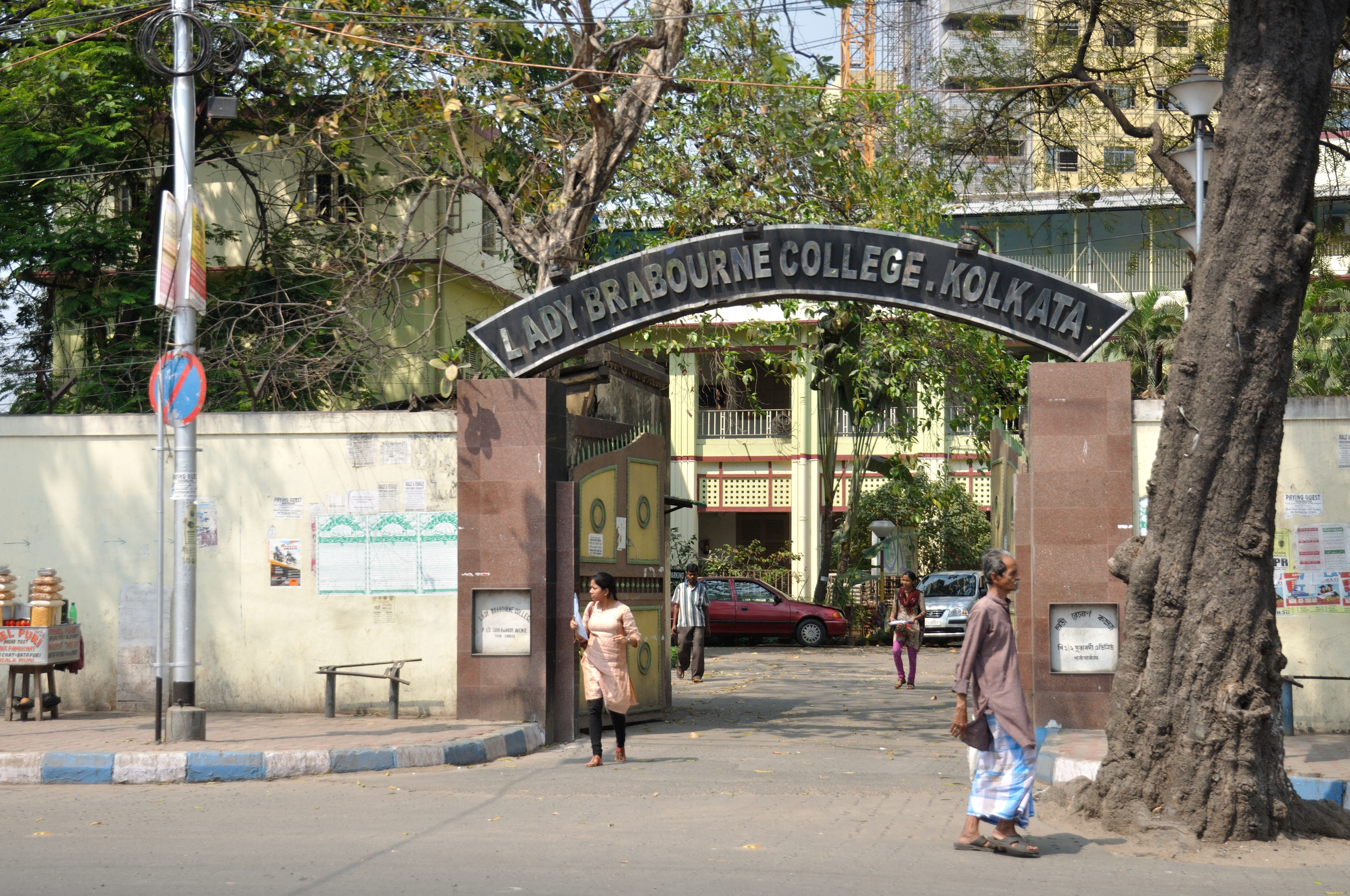
- Entrance of the Lady Brabourne College
- Motto: saṃgacchadhvam
- Motto in English: Walk in harmony
- Type: Autonomus college
- Established: 1939; 87 years ago
- Accreditation: NAAC
- Academic affiliations: University of Calcutta
- Budget: ₹25.89 crore (US$2.7 million) (FY2024–25 est.)
- Principal: Siuli Sarkar
- Academic staff: 87 (2025)
- Students: 1,474 (2025)
- Undergraduates: 1,200 (2025)
- Postgraduates: 274 (2025)
- Location: P-1/2, Suhrawardy Avenue, Beniapukur, Kolkata, West Bengal, 700017, India; 22.5454875°N 88.3689926°E
- Campus: Urban
- Website: ladybrabourne.ac.in

- Location within West Bengal Location within India

Lady Brabourne College (LBC) is an institution for women's education in Kolkata, India. The college admits undergraduates and post-graduates, and awards degrees from the University of Calcutta. It is a state government administered college and is in one of the more cosmopolitan localities of the city.

== History ==
Lady Brabourne College was established in July 1939 at a rented house in Park Circus in Calcutta (now Kolkata), following the initiative of the then Prime Minister of Bengal, A. K. Fazlul Huq. It was named after Doreen, Baroness Brabourne, an Anglo-Irish aristocrat who was the wife of The 5th Baron Brabourne, the then Governor of Bengal.

Lord Brabourne died on 23 February 1939. Sir John Herbert, the next Governor, laid down the foundation stone of the college on 26 August 1939. The college had 50 percent reserved seats for Muslim women and the rest for Hindus, Parsees, Sikhs, Jains and other ethnic communities.

The hostel facility was kept exclusively for Muslims. The college started admitting Hindu students due to shortage of Muslim students. It has since become difficult for Muslim students to get admission to the college according to the All India Minority Association. In 2017 the college, along with others affiliated with the University of Calcutta, was given the authority to award the degree of doctor of philosophy (Ph.D.).

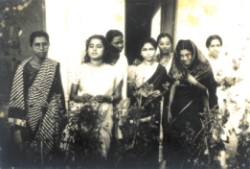
Students of Lady Brabourne College in 1948

== Notable Alumni ==
- Lady_Brabourne_College_alumni

== See also ==
- List of colleges affiliated to the University of Calcutta
- Education in India
- Education in West Bengal
