= Marshman =

The name Marshman is a family, or surname which originated in England and either refers to an occupation - namely a person whose job it was to work the marshes or it is derived from their residency possibly of Marsham in Norfolk, or in Mersham in Kent. There is a strong settlement of the Marshman family in Wiltshire, especially near Dilton Marsh.

Today in East Anglia, in England, workers known as Marshmen continue to collect reeds and rushes for the thatching industry.

Spelling variations include:

- Amarshan
- Marsham
- Marshan
- Marshania
- Marshom,
- Marshon

The name might apply to:

== People ==
- Arthur A. J. Marshman (1929–1997), English architect
- Bobby Marshman (1936–1964), American racing driver
- D. M. Marshman, Jr. (1922–2015), American screenwriter
- General Sir Henry Marshman Havelock-Allan (1830–1897), British soldier and politician
- Hannah Marshman (1767–1847), English missionary
- Jack Marshman (born 1989), Welsh mixed martial artist
- John Clark Marshman (1794–1877), English journalist and historian
- Joshua Marshman (1768–1837), English missionary
- Marshman Edward Wadsworth (1847–1921), American geologist and educator
- Victoria Marshman, contestant on America's Next Top Model, Cycle 9
