= Marshan =

Marshan may refer to:

- Marshan (Tangier), an upscale neighborhood in Tangier, Morocco
- A variant spelling of the surname Marshman or Marshania
- Marshan Township, Minnesota
- Marshania (Amarshan, Marshan), a surname of Abkhaz origin.
