= Charles Berkeley, 1st Earl of Falmouth =

English nobleman and naval officer

The Right Honourable Charles Berkeley
- The Earl of Falmouth
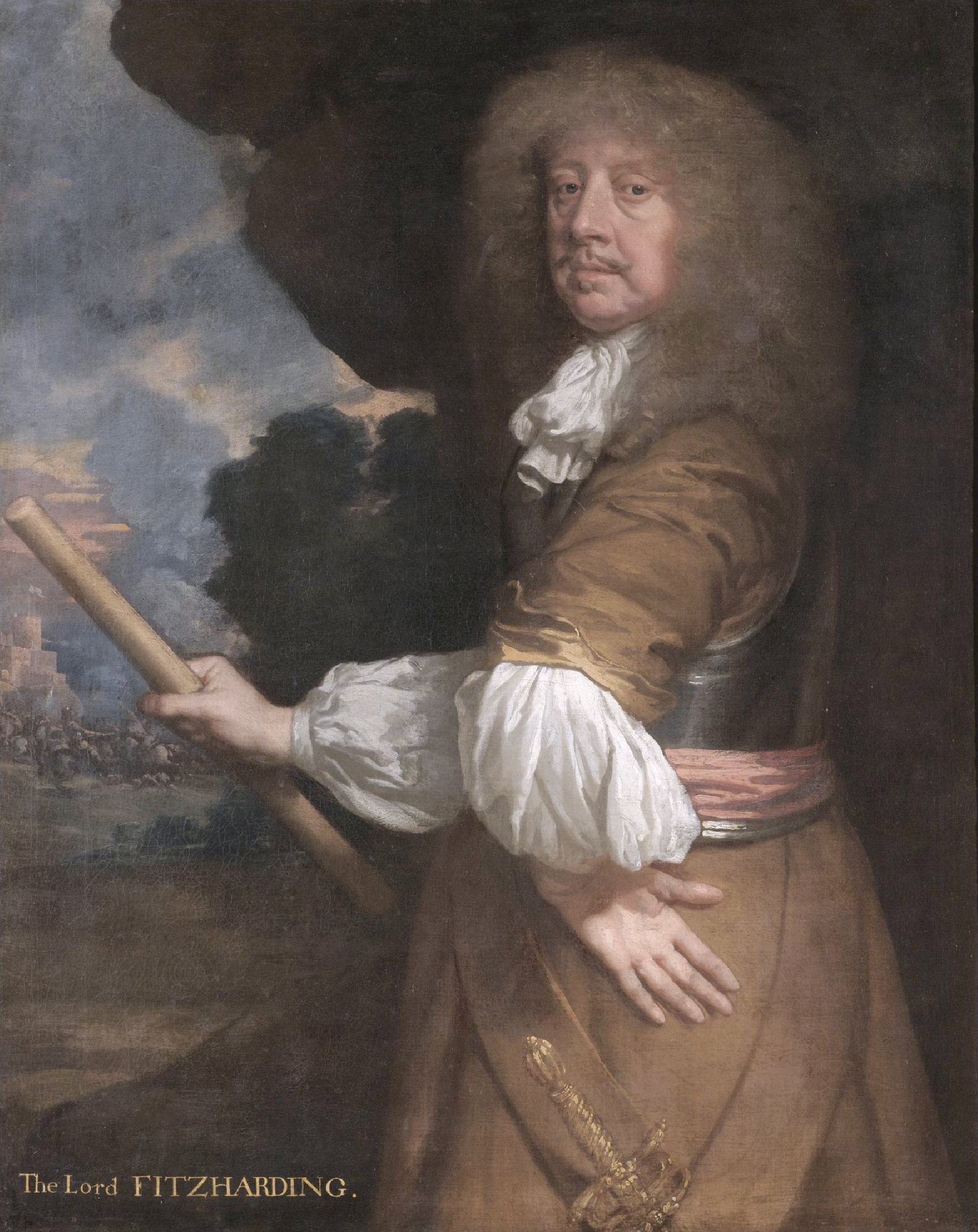
- Charles Berkeley, then known as Viscount Fitzhardinge by Peter Lely
- Tenure: 1664–1665 (as Earl of Falmouth); 1663–1665 (as Viscount Fitzhardinge)
- Predecessor: New creation
- Successor: Title extinct (as Earl of Falmouth); Charles Berkeley (as Viscount Fitzhardinge)
- Born: 11 January 1630
- Died: 3 June 1665 (aged 35)
- Spouse: Mary Bagot (m. 1664)
- Issue: Hon. Mary Berkeley
- Father: Charles Berkeley, 2nd Viscount Fitzhardinge
- Mother: Penelope Godolphin

Charles Berkeley, 1st Earl of Falmouth (11 January 1630 – 3 June 1665) was an English nobleman and naval officer who was the son of Charles Berkeley (1599–1668) and his wife Penelope née Godolphin (died 1669), of the Bruton branch of the Berkeley family.

== Career ==
He served the exiled Stuart court. His uncle, John Berkeley, 1st Baron Berkeley of Stratton, secured Charles's employment with James, Duke of York, until the Restoration. He was a cavalry officer and fought in the French and Spanish armies. Charles was subsequently created Baron Berkeley of Rathdowne, County Wicklow, Ireland, and Viscount Fitzhardinge of Berehaven, County Kerry, Ireland, on 1 July 1663.

Berkeley was an investor in the Company of Royal Adventurers between 1663 and 1665, during which 63 slaving voyages took place.

He was created Earl of Falmouth, in the Peerage of England, on 17 March 1664, and Baron Botetourt of Langport, Somerset on the same day. He was promoted Lieutenant-Governor of Portsmouth and was elected MP for New Romney.

During the Second Anglo-Dutch War, he volunteered for service in the Royal fleet. Charles was killed by a cannonball on 3 June 1665 on board the Royal Charles in one of the first exchanges of the Battle of Lowestoft.

His boisterous character made him not very well-loved by many, but his loyalty to the royal family favoured his relationship with the King. Clarendon was amazed at the flood of tears the King shed when he received the news that Berkeley had been killed.

The poet John Denham was less charitable about the demise of the Earl:

His shattered Head the fearless Duke disdains
And gave the last first proof that he had brains

== Personal life and family ==
In 1664, he married Mary Bagot, who, as the widowed Countess of Falmouth, became a mistress to King Charles II of England. They had one child, who was either "posthumous, or born very near the date of her father's death." Their daughter, who was known as Hon. Mary Bartley or Mary Barclay, was married in May 1681 to Sir Gilbert Cosin Gerard. They divorced in 1684 and she died on 18 April 1693.

Parliament of England
Preceded by Sir Norton Knatchbull, Bt; John Knatchbull	Member of Parliament for New Romney; 1661–1664; With: Sir Norton Knatchbull, Bt	Succeeded by Sir Norton Knatchbull, Bt; Henry Brouncker
Military offices
New regiment	Captain and Colonel of The Duke of York's Troop of Horse Guards; 1660–1665	Succeeded by The Earl of Feversham
Court offices
Preceded by Sir Henry Bennet	Keeper of the Privy Purse; 1662–1665	Succeeded by Baptist May
Peerage of England
New creation	Earl of Falmouth; 1664–1665	Extinct
Peerage of Ireland
New creation	Viscount Fitzhardinge; 1663–1665	Succeeded by Charles Berkeley
