= Michael Knatchbull, 5th Baron Brabourne =

British soldier and politician and Governor of Bombay and Bengal (1895–1939)

The Right Honourable The Lord Brabourne GCSI GCIE MC
- Knatchbull in 1929

Member of Parliament for Ashford
- In office 27 October 1931 – 17 March 1933
- Preceded by: Roderick Kedward
- Succeeded by: Sir Patrick Spens

Acting Viceroy and Governor-General of India
- In office 25 June – 22 October 1938
- Monarch: George VI
- Prime Minister: Neville Chamberlain
- Preceded by: The Marquess of Linlithgow
- Succeeded by: The Marquess of Linlithgow

Governor of Bombay
- In office 9 December 1933 – 30 May 1937
- Preceded by: Sir Frederick Sykes
- Succeeded by: Sir Lawrence Roger Lumley

Governor of Bengal
- In office 30 May 1937 – 23 February 1939
- Preceded by: Sir John Anderson
- Succeeded by: John Arthur Herbert

Personal details
- Born: Michael Herbert Rudolf Knatchbull-Hugessen; 8 May 1895
- Died: 23 February 1939 (aged 43) Calcutta, Bengal Province, British India
- Spouse: Lady Doreen Browne (m. 1919)
- Children: Norton Knatchbull, 6th Baron Brabourne; John Knatchbull, 7th Baron Brabourne
- Parent: Cecil Knatchbull-Hugessen (father)
- Military career
- Allegiance: United Kingdom
- Branch: British Army; Royal Air Force
- Service years: 1914–1920
- Rank: Major
- Unit: Royal Artillery
- Conflicts: World War I; Gallipoli campaign
- Awards: Military Cross

Michael Herbert Rudolf Knatchbull, 5th Baron Brabourne, GCSI, GCIE, MC (8 May 1895 – 23 February 1939) was a British peer and soldier, the son of the 4th Baron Brabourne.

== Early life ==
Born on 8 May 1895 to Cecil Knatchbull-Hugessen, 4th Baron Brabourne, and his wife Helena Flesch von Brunningen (an Austrian noblewoman), as Michael Herbert Rudolf Knatchbull-Hugessen, he dropped the Hugessen part of his surname by deed poll in June 1919. Knatchbull was educated at Wellington College and the Royal Military Academy, Woolwich.

== Military career ==
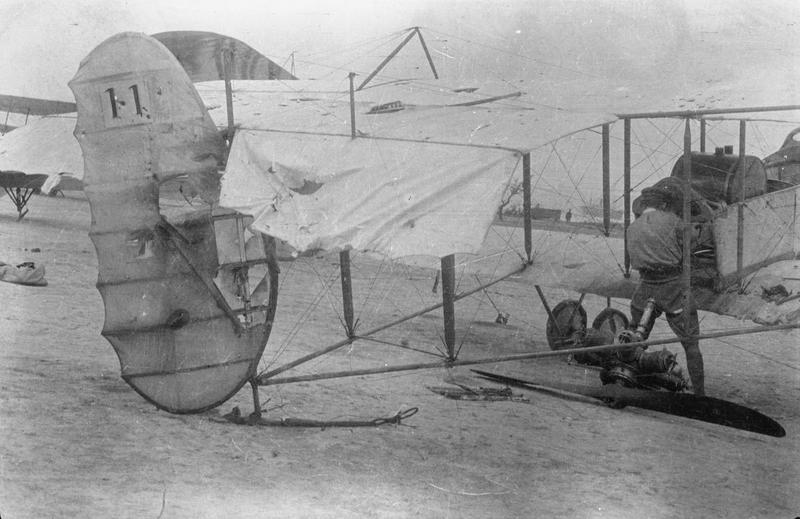
Damage from enemy anti-aircraft fire sustained by a Farman of No. 3 Squadron RNAS, flown by Reginald Marix with Lt. Knatchbull as observer, June 1915.

Knatchbull was commissioned as a second lieutenant in the Royal Artillery on 17 November 1914. He served in the Gallipoli Campaign from April 1915, attached to No. 3 Squadron, Royal Naval Air Service, flying artillery spotting missions, receiving promotion to lieutenant on 23 July. On 22 September 1915 he received a mention in despatches from General Ian Hamilton, Commander-in-Chief of the Mediterranean Expeditionary Force, and on 8 November was awarded the Military Cross for his "distinguished service in the Field during the operations at the Dardanelles."

Knatchbull was seconded to the staff to serve as an aide-de-camp on 8 June 1916, serving until 20 April 1918, when he was seconded to the Royal Air Force as a Staff Officer, 3rd Class. He was later promoted to the acting rank of captain, and then to acting major on 11 October 1918 when appointed Staff Officer, 2nd Class (Air). On 8 November 1918 he received a mention in despatches from Field Marshal Sir Douglas Haig.

After the end of the war, on 1 August 1919, he was granted a permanent commission in the RAF with the rank of lieutenant. However, he was placed on half-pay on 1 April 1920, and on 1 October was placed on the retired list on account of ill-health contracted on active service, with the rank of flight lieutenant.

== House of Commons ==
Knatchbull was elected Conservative Member of Parliament (MP) for Ashford in 1931 and served as Parliamentary Private Secretary to Samuel Hoare, Secretary of State for India, from 1932 to 1933.

== House of Lords ==
In 1933, upon his father's death, he succeeded as Baron Brabourne following which he was made Governor of Bombay and was invested as a Knight Grand Commander of the Order of the Indian Empire.

=== Governor of Bombay ===
While Governor of Bombay he laid the foundation stone at the historic Brabourne Stadium cricket ground in 1936 after conducting negotiations for the land with Anthony de Mello of the Cricket Club of India (CCI).

=== Governor of Bengal ===
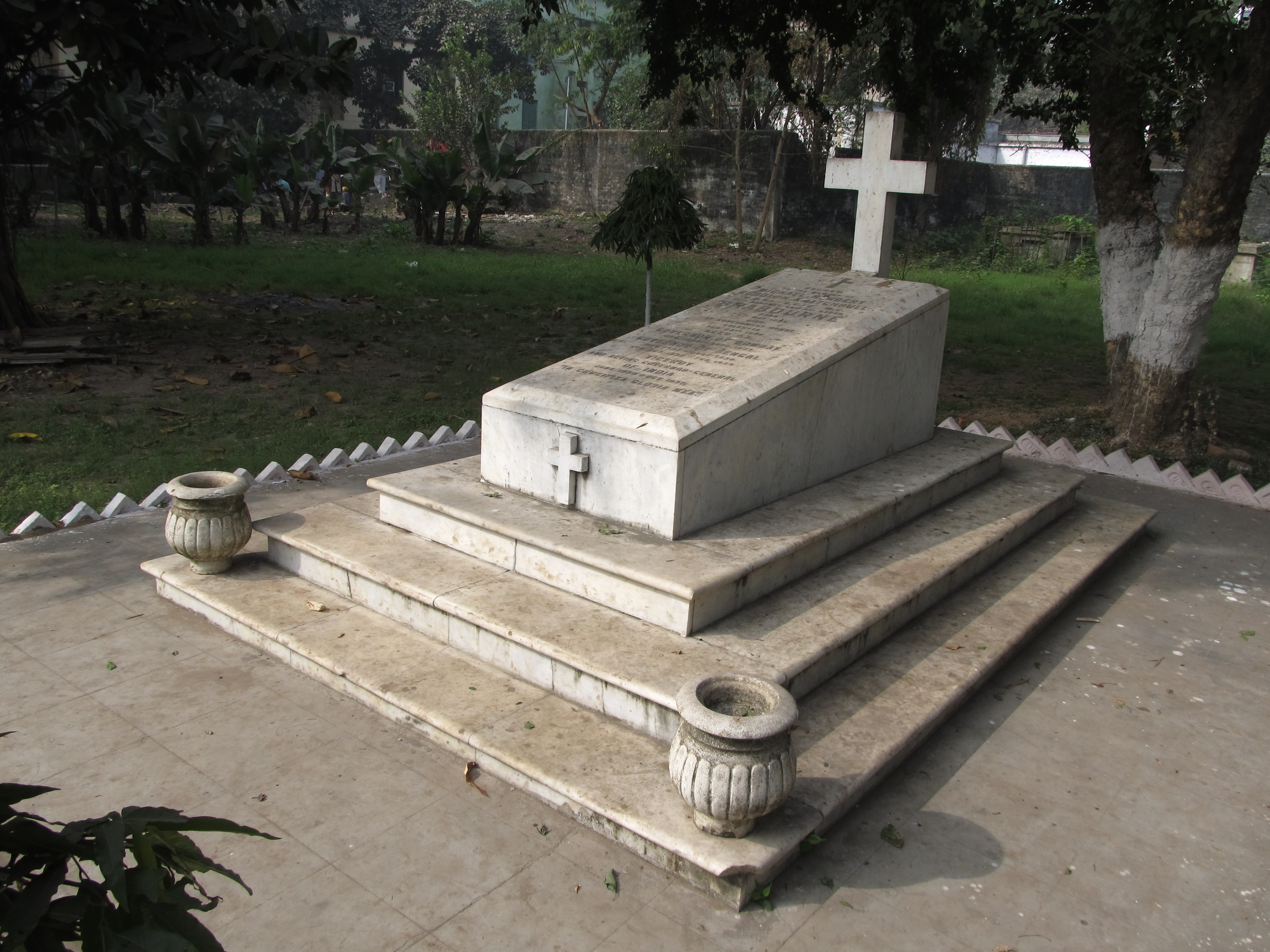
The grave of The 5th Baron Brabourne at St. John's Churchyard, Kolkata, India.

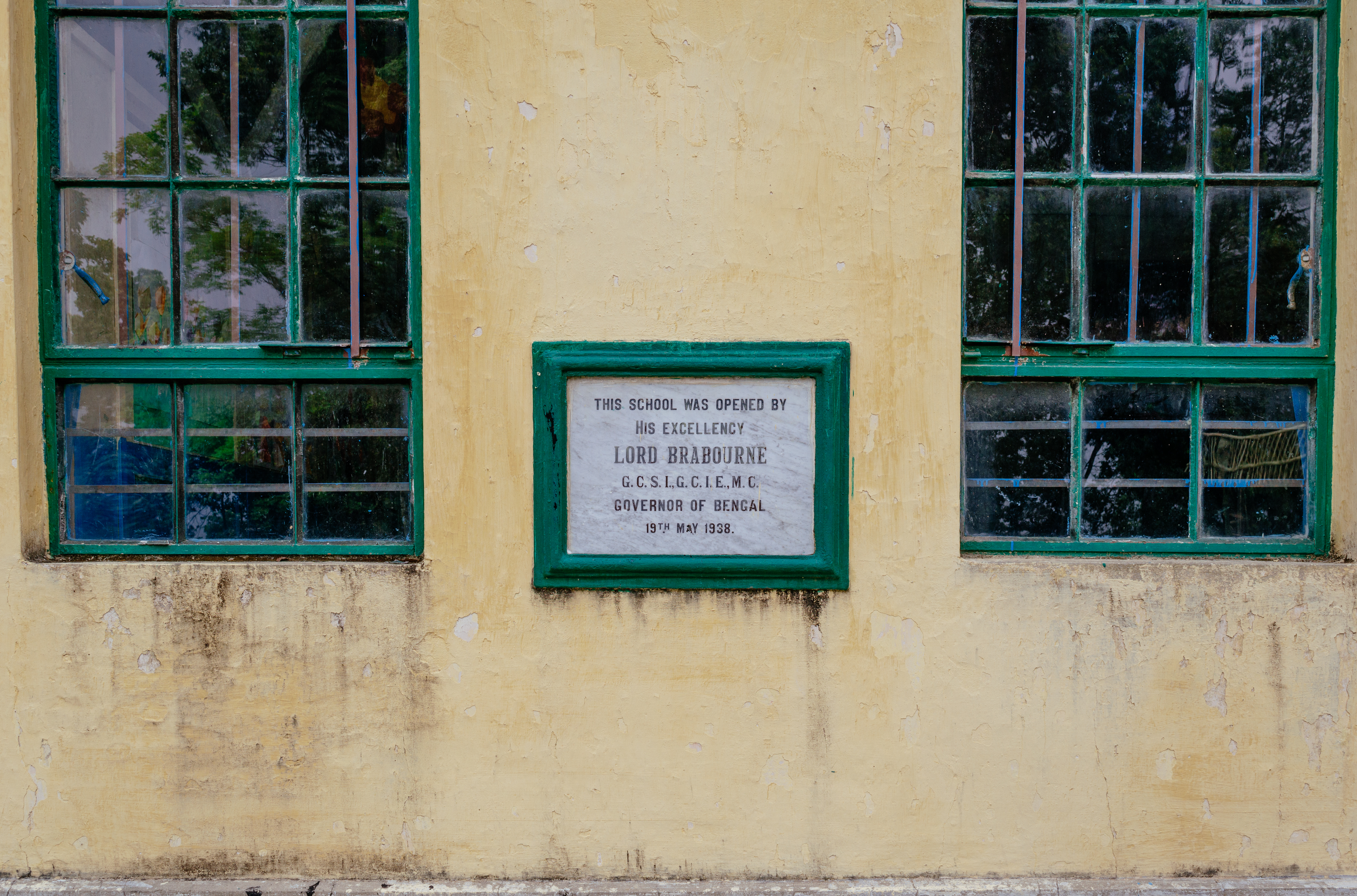
Plaque commemorating the opening of Dr. Graham’s Homes, Kalimpong by Lord Brabourne, Governor of Bengal on 19th May 1938

In 1937 he also became a Knight Grand Commander of the Order of the Star of India and served as Governor of Bengal until he died on 23 February 1939.

=== Acting Viceroy of India ===
In June 1938, he was appointed as an Acting Viceroy of India. He served as the Viceroy for four months, as Lord Linlithgow (the then current Viceroy) had gone to England for a short vacation. Muhammad Ali Jinnah, the chairman of Indian religion-based political party All-India Muslim League, had a meeting with Brabourne on 16 August 1938 at his residence in Shimla. In the meeting, he requested Brabourne to accept him as the representative of all India's Muslims and in return he promised to support the British at the central assembly, but the Viceroy declined to do so. The Viceroy knew that if Jinnah is made the representative of Muslims, it would be a caution for the image of the British in the vision of other leaders. This disappointed Jinnah and he became even more resolved in his approach towards an aggressive demand for a separate Muslim state in South Asia. Brabourne served as the Viceroy till 22 October 1938.

== Family ==
On 22 January 1919, he married Lady Doreen Browne, youngest daughter of the 6th Marquess of Sligo, in St Peter's Church, Eaton Square. They had two sons:

- Norton Cecil Michael Knatchbull, 6th Baron Brabourne (1922–1943)
- John Ulick Knatchbull, 7th Baron Brabourne (1924–2005). In 1946 he married Patricia Mountbatten (later 2nd Countess Mountbatten of Burma) and had issue.

His widow, The Dowager Lady Brabourne, was murdered in the 1979 bombing by Provisional Irish Republican Army of 1st Earl Mountbatten of Burma's boat. One of their grandsons also died in the bombing.

Parliament of the United Kingdom
Preceded by Roderick Kedward	Member of Parliament for Ashford; 1931–1933	Succeeded by Sir Patrick Spens
Political offices
Preceded by Sir Frederick Sykes	Governor of Bombay; 1933–1937	Succeeded by Sir Lawrence Lumley
Preceded by Sir John Anderson	Governor of Bengal; 1937–1939	Succeeded by John Arthur Herbert
Peerage of the United Kingdom
Preceded by Cecil Knatchbull-Hugessen	Baron Brabourne; 1933–1939	Succeeded by Norton Knatchbull
