= Norton Knatchbull, 3rd Earl Mountbatten of Burma =

British peer

The Right Honourable The Earl Mountbatten of Burma
- Born: Norton Louis Philip Knatchbull; 8 October 1947 (age 79); Denmark Hill, London, England
- Spouse: Penelope Eastwood (m. 1979)
- Issue: Nicholas Knatchbull, Lord Brabourne; Lady Alexandra Hooper; The Hon. Leonora Knatchbull
- Father: John Knatchbull, 7th Baron Brabourne
- Mother: Patricia Knatchbull, 2nd Countess Mountbatten of Burma

Norton Louis Philip Knatchbull, 3rd Earl Mountbatten of Burma, 8th Baron Brabourne (born 8 October 1947), known until 2005 as Lord Romsey, is a British peer. He is a second cousin of King Charles III.

== Life and education ==
Mountbatten was born at King's College Hospital in London as the eldest son of Patricia Knatchbull, née Mountbatten, later 2nd Countess Mountbatten of Burma, and film producer John Knatchbull, 7th Baron Brabourne.

Mountbatten was educated at the Dragon School, in Oxford, and Gordonstoun School, Elgin, Moray, Scotland. He subsequently attended the University of Kent in southeast England.

He followed his father into the British film industry in the 1970s, working as location manager on A Bridge Too Far and associate producer of Death on the Nile and the television serial Quatermass.

On the death of his father on 23 September 2005, he became the 8th Baron Brabourne, of Brabourne in the County of Kent, in the peerage of the United Kingdom. He also succeeded to the Knatchbull Baronetcy, of Mersham Hatch in the County of Kent, in the baronetage of England. On the death of his mother on 13 June 2017, he became 3rd Earl Mountbatten of Burma, also a title in the peerage of the United Kingdom created for his grandfather, Admiral of the Fleet Louis Mountbatten, 1st Earl Mountbatten of Burma.

He is a descendant of Queen Victoria, whose second daughter Princess Alice was his maternal great-great-grandmother. He is also a second cousin to King Charles III through his mother. King Charles's father, Prince Philip, Duke of Edinburgh, was his godfather (and first cousin once removed). Mountbatten is the godfather of King Charles's elder son, William, Prince of Wales. He is related to author Jane Austen, as his father, John Knatchbull, 7th Baron Brabourne, was a descendant of her brother Edward Austen Knight.

== Marriage and children ==
Mountbatten is married to Penelope Meredith Eastwood (born 16 April 1953), a daughter of Reginald Wray Frank Eastwood (1912–1980), a millionaire and former butcher who founded the Angus Steakhouse chain, and Marian Elizabeth (1926–2020), née Hood. They were wed on 20 October 1979 at Romsey Abbey, less than two months after the IRA murdered his 79-year-old maternal grandfather, Louis Mountbatten, 1st Earl Mountbatten of Burma; his 14-year-old younger brother, Nicholas Knatchbull; and his 83-year-old paternal grandmother, Doreen Knatchbull, Dowager Lady Brabourne. The family home is Broadlands, Hampshire.

The 3rd Earl Mountbatten of Burma and his wife have three children, three grandsons and one granddaughter:

- Nicholas Louis Charles Norton Knatchbull, Lord Brabourne (born 15 May 1981), his father's heir apparent; married Ambre Pouzet on 20 May 2021 at Broadlands. They have two children:
  - The Hon. Alexander Knatchbull (born June 2022)
  - The Hon. Endora Luna Marie Knatchbull (born 2025)
- Lady Alexandra Victoria Edwina Diana Hooper (née Knatchbull; born 5 December 1982); a goddaughter of Diana, Princess of Wales. She married Thomas Edward Huntly Hooper on 25 June 2016, at Romsey Abbey. They have two sons:
  - Inigo Norton Sebastian Mountbatten Hooper (born 21 December 2017)
  - Alden Peter Theodore Mountbatten Hooper (born 27 March 2020)
- The Hon. Leonora Louise Marie Elizabeth Knatchbull (25 June 1986 – 22 October 1991). She died of kidney cancer at the age of five years and is buried in the grounds of Broadlands. The charity Leonora Children's Cancer Fund was founded in her memory.

From 2010 to 2014, Mountbatten was in an extramarital relationship with Eugenie, Lady Nuttall, widow of Sir Nicholas Nuttall, 3rd Baronet, who was heir to the Edmund Nuttall Limited construction company.

== Titles ==
- 1947–1979: The Honourable Norton Knatchbull
- 1979–2005: Lord Romsey
- 2005–2017: The Right Honourable The Lord Brabourne
- 2017–present: The Right Honourable The Earl Mountbatten of Burma

== Arms ==
Coat of arms of Norton Knatchbull, 3rd Earl Mountbatten of Burma
Notes The arms were granted in 1966. Crest 1st, On a Chapeau Gules, turned up Ermine, an Ounce statant Ermine, spotted Sable (Knatchbull); 2nd, Out of a Ducal Coronet Or, a Plume of Ostrich Feathers alternately Argent and Sable (Mountbatten); 3rd, Out of a Ducal Coronet Or, two Horns barry of ten Argent and Gules, issuing from each three Linden Leaves Vert, and from the outer side of each horn four Branches barwise having three like Leaves pendent therefrom Vert (Hesse) Escutcheon Quarterly 1st, Azure, in bend three Crosses-Crosslet fitchée between two Bendlets Or (Knatchbull); 2nd, Argent, two Pallets Sable (Mountbatten); 3rd, Azure, a Lion rampant double queued barry of ten Argent and Gules, crowned Or, within a Bordure compony Gules and Argent (Hesse); 4th, The Royal Arms differenced by a Label of three-points Argent, the centre point charged with a Rose Gules, and the outer points with an Ermine Spot Sable (Princess Alice). Supporters Two Lions queue fourchée and crowned all or. Motto 1st, IN CRUCIFIXA GLORIA MEA (My Glory is in the Cross) (Knatchbull); 2nd, IN HONOUR BOUND (Mountbatten).

== Bibliography ==
- Marlene A. Eilers, Queen Victoria's Descendants (Baltimore, Maryland: Genealogical Publishing Co., 1987), page 184.

Peerage of the United Kingdom
Preceded by Patricia Knatchbull as Countess	Earl Mountbatten of Burma; 2017–present	Incumbent; Heir: Nicholas Knatchbull
Preceded by John Knatchbull	Baron Brabourne; 2005–present	Incumbent; Heir: Nicholas Knatchbull
Lines of succession
Preceded by Louise Mountbatten	Line of succession to the British throne descendant of Princess Alice of the United Kingdom, daughter of Queen Victoria	Succeeded by Nicholas Knatchbull
