= Cecil Knatchbull-Hugessen, 4th Baron Brabourne =

English cricketer and British peer (1863–1933)

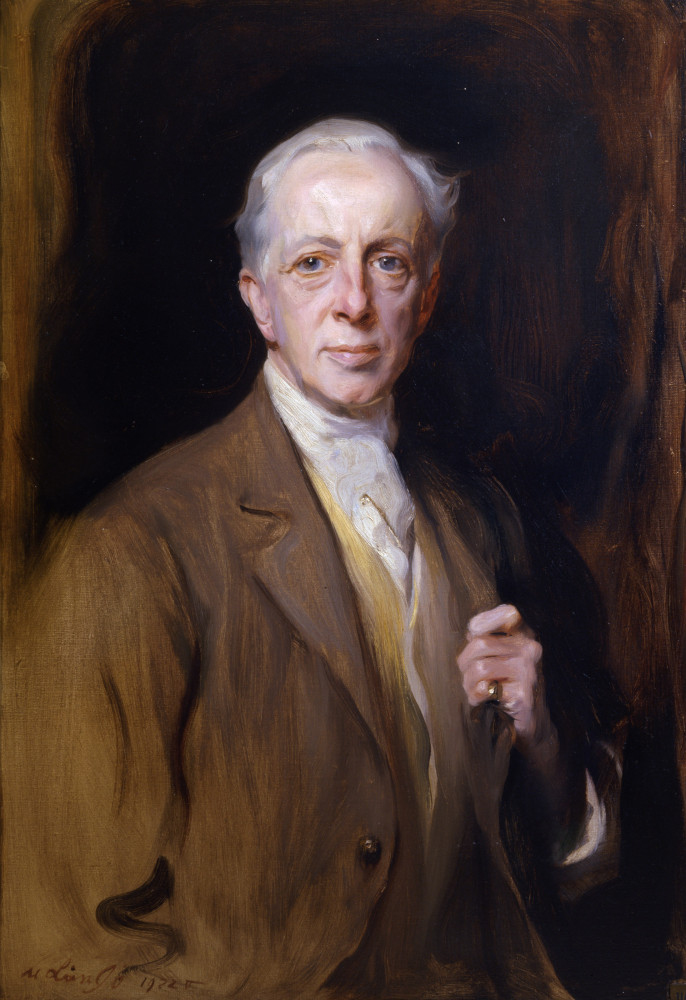
Knatchbull-Hugessen

Cecil Marcus Knatchbull-Hugessen, 4th Baron Brabourne (27 November 1863 – 15 February 1933) was an English cricketer, and later a British peer.

Knatchbull-Hugessen was born in Lowndes Square in Chelsea, the fourth child and second son of Edward Knatchbull-Hugessen, 1st Baron Brabourne and his first wife, Anna Maria Elizabeth (née Southwell). He was educated at Eton College where he was in the cricket XI from 1881 to 1883.

He went to King's College, Cambridge, with a scholarship and won the Pitt Scholarship, graduating with a first class degree in classics in 1886. He was considered to be an "accomplished scholar", was "highly distinguished for the Chancellor's medal" in 1887 and considered "an extraordinarily good modern linguist". He published The Political Evolution the Hungarian Nation in 1908, a text which became "a standard work on the subject".

A right-handed batsman and wicket-keeper, he made a total of 12 first-class cricket appearances between 1884 and 1886, primarily for Cambridge University. He won a blue in 1886 and also played once for Kent County Cricket Club in 1884.

After graduating, Knatchbull-Hugessen spent a year as a teacher at Eton before training as a barrister, being called to the bar in 1890.

He married Helena Regina Frederica Flesch von Brunningen, daughter of the Austrian nobleman Hermann Flesch Edler von Brunningen, on 8 November 1893. He succeeded to the title Baron Brabourne in 1915, following the death of his nephew Wyndham Knatchbull-Hugessen. Knatchbull-Hugessen also inherited the Knatchbull Baronetcy, of Mersham Hatch, after the death of another cousin, Sir Wyndham Knatchbull, 12th Baronet, in 1917.

Knatchbull-Hugessen was a director and later the chairman of the Consolidated Gold Fields of South Africa and was primarily a businessman. He died while journeying from Cape Town, where he had business interests, to London aboard the SS Caernarvon Castle in February 1933, aged 69.

== Bibliography ==
- Carlaw, Derek (2020). Kent County Cricketers, A to Z: Part One (1806–1914) (PDF). Cardiff: ACS.

Peerage of the United Kingdom
Preceded by Wyndham Knatchbull-Hugessen	Baron Brabourne; 1915–1933	Succeeded by Michael Knatchbull
Baronetage of England
Preceded by Wyndham Knatchbull	Baronet (of Mersham Hatch); 1917–1933	Succeeded by Michael Knatchbull
