= John Knatchbull, 7th Baron Brabourne =

British film and television producer (1924–2005)

Lieutenant The Right Honourable The Lord Brabourne CBE
- Baron Brabourne in 1969

Member of the House of Lords Lord Temporal
- In office 23 February 1953 – 11 November 1999 as a hereditary peer
- Preceded by: Michael Knatchbull, 5th Baron Brabourne
- Succeeded by: Seat abolished

Personal details
- Born: John Ulick Knatchbull; 9 November 1924
- Died: 23 September 2005 (aged 80)
- Spouse: Patricia Knatchbull, 2nd Countess Mountbatten of Burma (m. 1946)
- Children: Norton Knatchbull, 3rd Earl Mountbatten of Burma; Hon. Michael-John Knatchbull; Hon. Anthony Knatchbull; Lady Joanna Knatchbull; Lady Amanda Knatchbull; Hon. Philip Knatchbull; Hon. Nicholas Knatchbull; Hon. Timothy Knatchbull
- Parents: Michael Knatchbull, 5th Baron Brabourne; Lady Doreen Browne
- Relatives: Louis Mountbatten, 1st Earl Mountbatten of Burma (father-in-law); Edwina Mountbatten, Countess Mountbatten of Burma (mother-in-law)
- Known for: A Passage to India; Death on the Nile; Murder on the Orient Express
- Awards: Commander of the Order of the British Empire; Academy Award nomination (for Best Picture)
- Other titles: Baron Brabourne (1953–2005)

Military service
- Allegiance: United Kingdom
- Branch/service: British Army
- Years of service: 1943–1946
- Rank: Lieutenant
- Unit: Coldstream Guards
- Battles/wars: World War II

John Ulick Knatchbull, 7th Baron Brabourne, CBE (9 November 1924 – 23 September 2005), professionally known as John Brabourne, was a British peer, television producer and Oscar-nominated film producer. Married to the elder daughter of 1st Earl Mountbatten, Brabourne and his wife were survivors of the bombing which killed his father-in-law, mother and son.

== Biography ==
Brabourne was born in 1924, the second son of Michael Knatchbull, 5th Baron Brabourne, and his wife, Lady Doreen Browne. He was educated at Eton College and Brasenose College, Oxford. He was barely 14 when his father died in February 1939 and his elder brother, Norton, inherited the Barony.

=== Marriage ===
At the end of the war, Brabourne returned to England and settled in the family seat, Mersham in Kent. On 26 October 1946, at Romsey Abbey in Hampshire, at the age of 21, he married Patricia Mountbatten, elder daughter of Louis Mountbatten, 1st Viscount Mountbatten, later 1st Earl Mountbatten of Burma. Brabourne's best man at the wedding was Squadron Leader Charles Harris-St. John.

Lady Brabourne was to inherit her father's peerages in due course. This would make Lord and Lady Brabourne among the few married couples to each hold peerages in their own right. Also, Lady Brabourne was related to the British royal family, and her aunt Louise Mountbatten was at that time the Crown Princess (later Queen) of Sweden. In February 1947, only months after the wedding, Brabourne's father-in-law was appointed Viceroy of India. The newly-wed couple spent several months in India, residing with her parents in the viceregal palace. In November the same year, Lady Brabourne's first cousin Philip, Duke of Edinburgh, wed Princess Elizabeth, future queen of the United Kingdom.

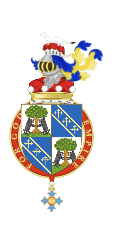
Lord Brabourne's arms as CBE

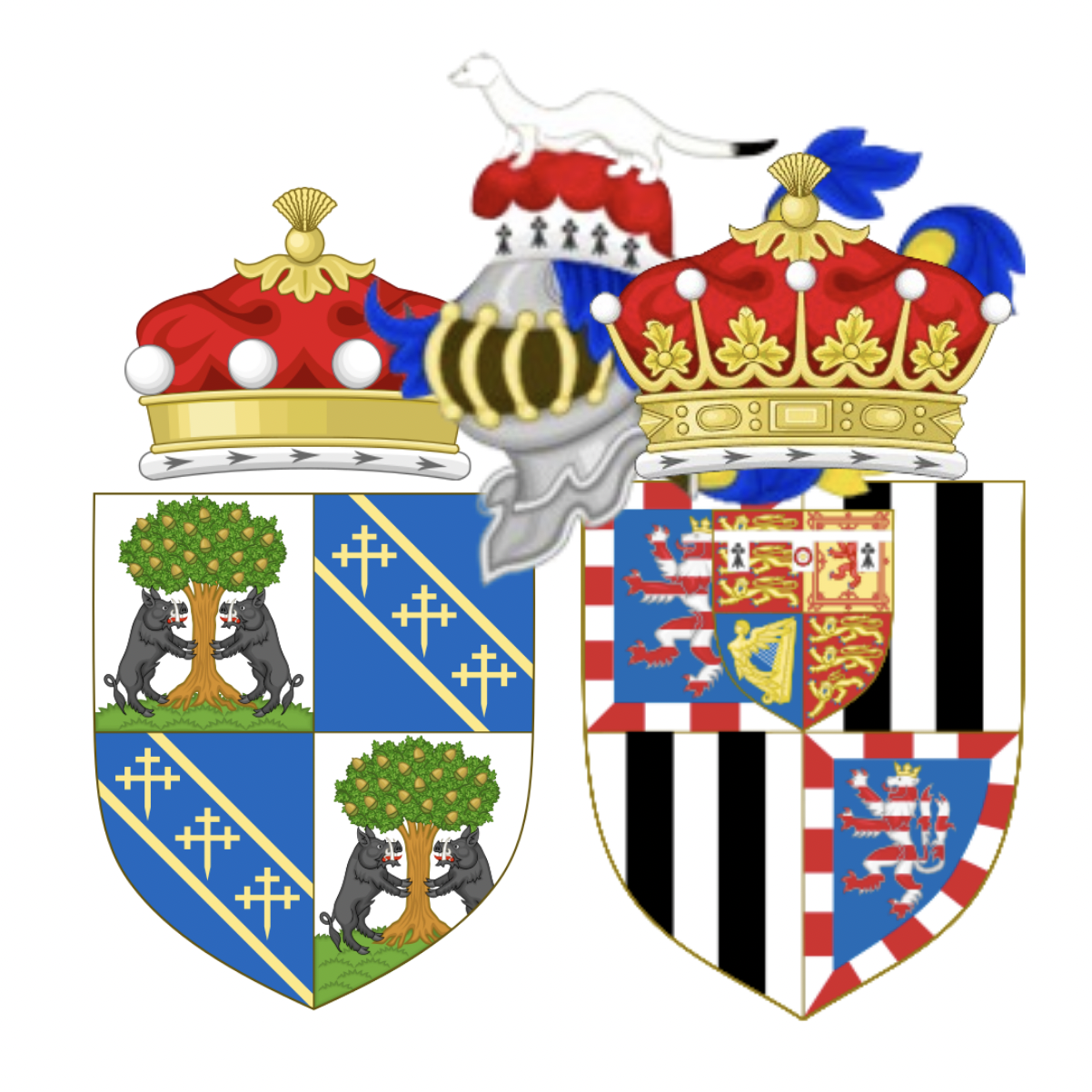
Joint arms of Lord Brabourne and Lady Mountbatten

Lord and Lady Brabourne had eight children, including Norton Louis Philip Knatchbull, 3rd Earl Mountbatten of Burma (born 8 October 1947), Lady Amanda Patricia Victoria Knatchbull (born 26 June 1957), and Nicholas Timothy Charles Knatchbull.

=== Career and service ===
In the late 1940s, shortly after leaving the army, Brabourne began working as an assistant production manager for certain television productions, mostly based on war-related themes. He graduated to the role of production manager by the early 1950s, and finally became a producer in his own right in 1958, with Harry Black a romantic story set in India, with war as the distant context. This was followed by Sink the Bismarck! (1960). War, empire and India were recurrent themes in his work, and A Passage to India (1984) is among his films. His other motion pictures include Murder on the Orient Express (1974), Death on the Nile (1978), and Little Dorrit (1988).

In 1970, he founded Mersham Productions, a production house named after his family seat in Kent, which produced many of his works thereafter. He served as a director of Thames Television (later chairman) and Euston Films from 1978 to 1995, and a director of Thorn EMI from 1981 to 1986.

John Brabourne received two Academy Award nominations for Best Picture, as producer of Romeo and Juliet (1968) and A Passage to India (1984). In 1985, Brabourne was invested as a Fellow of the British Film Institute, an organisation he also served as a Governor. In 1993, he was made a Commander of the Order of the British Empire.

He was the subject of This Is Your Life in 1990 when he was surprised by Michael Aspel at the Old Brewery venue in London.

Brabourne served as a governor of various schools, including Norton Knatchbull School (founded by an ancestor c. 1630 AD) from 1947 to 2000; Wye College in Kent from 1955 to 2000, and Gordonstoun School from 1964 to 1994. He also served as Pro-Chancellor of the University of Kent from 1993 to 1999.

=== IRA bombing ===
On 27 August 1979, while the family was on holiday in Mullaghmore, County Sligo, Lord Brabourne's father-in-law, Earl Mountbatten of Burma, took a number of family members out lobstering on his motorboat, Shadow V, in Donegal Bay. Having planned to murder Mountbatten, the Irish Republican Army (IRA) placed a bomb inside the boat on the night of the 26th. Mountbatten and several members of the party were killed the next morning when the bomb was triggered by an IRA observer onshore who was armed with a radio detonator. The dead included Brabourne's 83-year-old mother, the Dowager Baroness Brabourne; one of his twin 14-year-old sons, Nicholas Knatchbull; and 15-year-old Paul Maxwell from County Fermanagh who had been hired for the summer as Mountbatten's boat boy. Brabourne, his wife Patricia, and their other twin son Timothy were severely injured, but survived the attack.

Lord Brabourne died on 23 September 2005 at his home in Kent, aged 80. His wife Patricia, Countess Mountbatten of Burma, died in June 2017.

== References and notes ==
Peerage of the United Kingdom
Preceded by Norton Knatchbull	Baron Brabourne; 1943–2005	Succeeded by Norton Knatchbull
