= Doreen Knatchbull, Baroness Brabourne =

Anglo-Irish aristocrat and socialite (1896–1979)

The Right Honourable The Lady Brabourne CI DStJ
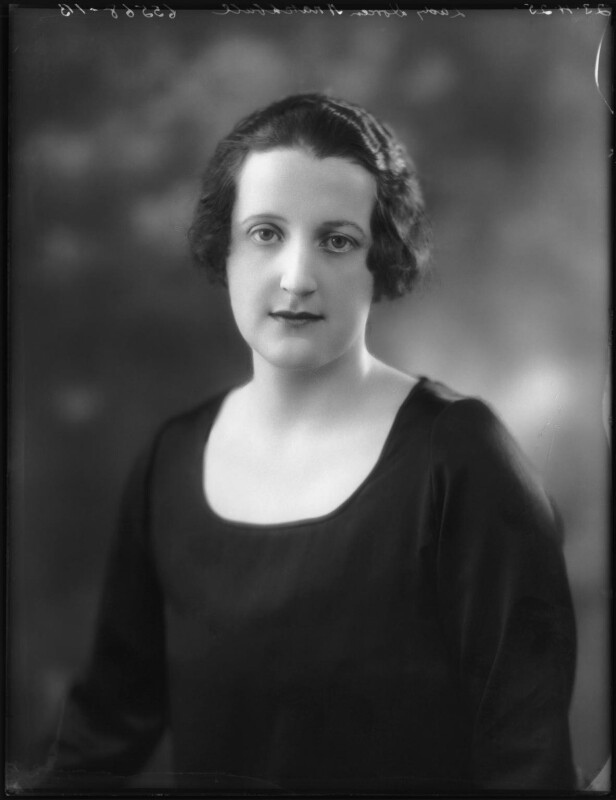
- Brabourne in 1925
- Born: Doreen Geraldine Browne; 29 May 1896
- Died: 28 August 1979 (aged 83)
- Spouse: Michael Knatchbull, 5th Baron Brabourne (m. 1919; died 1939)
- Children: Norton Knatchbull, 6th Baron Brabourne; John Knatchbull, 7th Baron Brabourne
- Parents: George Browne, 6th Marquess of Sligo; Agatha Hodgson
- Relatives: William Forsyth (great-grandfather)

Doreen Geraldine Knatchbull, Baroness Brabourne (née Lady Doreen Geraldine Browne; 29 May 1896 – 28 August 1979) was an Anglo-Irish aristocrat and socialite. She died as a result of her injuries following an attack off the coast of County Sligo by the Provisional IRA targeting her son's father-in-law, Louis, 1st Earl Mountbatten of Burma, in August 1979.

== Family life ==
Doreen Geraldine Browne was born on 29 May 1896, the third child of George Ulick Browne and Agatha Stewart Hodgson (1867–1965), granddaughter of William Forsyth QC. On 30 December 1903, her grandfather, Lord Henry Ulick Browne, succeeded his elder brother as 5th Marquess of Sligo. Her father took the courtesy title Earl of Altamont and Browne became Lady Doreen.

On 22 January 1919, Browne married the Hon. Michael Knatchbull-Hugessen, a son and eventual successor of Cecil, 4th Baron Brabourne.

On 15 February 1933, her husband succeeded his father as 5th Baron Brabourne and she became The Lady Brabourne. Her husband, Lord Brabourne, served as Governor of Bombay from 1933 until 1937, and then as Governor of Bengal from 1937 until his death.

Brabourne was appointed to the Order of the Crown of India on 5 November 1937.

The National Portrait Gallery holds four photographs of her, including two portraits by Alexander Bassano.

== Death ==
On 27 August 1979, Brabourne was seriously injured in an explosion that killed Lord Mountbatten (the father of the wife of her younger son), their teenage grandson Nicholas, and local boy Paul Maxwell, on Donegal Bay, County Sligo. A bomb had been planted in Mountbatten's fishing boat by a member of the Provisional IRA. Brabourne died in hospital from her injuries the next day, aged 83.

== Commemoration ==
Her name is commemorated by the eponymous Lady Brabourne College, which was established in 1939 as the first women's college for Muslim women in Calcutta, India. She took the initiative in establishing this institution following complaints from Muslim girls that they were discriminated against by the Hindu establishment at the elite Bethune College, which was the first women's college in India.
