= Sir Norton Knatchbull, 1st Baronet =

English scholar and politician

Sir Norton Knatchbull Bt
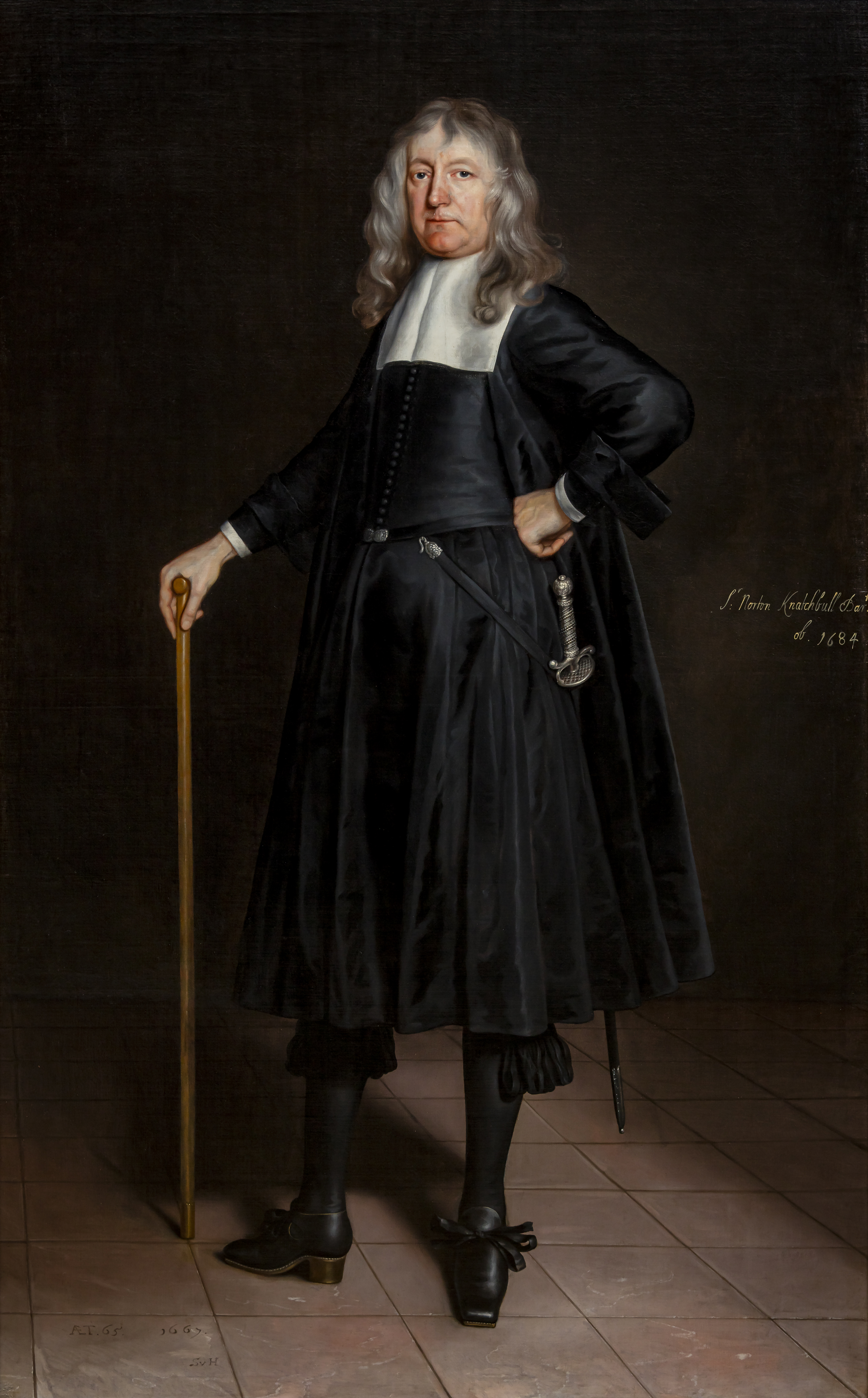
- 1667 portrait of Knatchbull by Samuel Dirksz van Hoogstraten
- Born: 26 December 1602
- Died: 3 February 1685 (aged 82); Mersham Hatch
- Resting place: St John the Baptist's church, Mersham; 51.1169°N 0.931405°E
- Education: St John's College, Cambridge
- Occupations: Politician; biblical scholar
- Spouses: Dorothy Westtrow (m. 1630) Dorothy Honeywood (m. 1662)
- Children: with Dorothy Westtrow: Sir John Knatchbull, 2nd Baronet; Thomas Knatchbull
- Parents: Thomas Knatchbull; Eleanor Astley
- Family: Knatchbull

Sir Norton Knatchbull, 1st Baronet (26 December 1602 – 3 February 1685) was an English scholar and politician who represented Kent and New Romney in the House of Commons of England between 1640 and 1679.

== Life ==
Knatchbull was born on 26 December 1602, the second son of Thomas Knatchbull (d. 1623) of Maidstone and Eleanor Astley (d. 1638), daughter and coheir of John Astley, of Maidstone.

He was a student at St John's College, Cambridge in 1516 and was admiited to the Middle Temple in 1624.

On the death of his uncle, Sir Norton Knatchbull, in 1536, he succeeded to the family estate, Mersham Hatch, 15 miles north of New Romney. His uncle had founded the free school at Ashford in 1530, and the younger Norton ″confirmed the deed of endowment for the school of £30 per annum″ and added to its buildings.

In April 1640, Knatchbull was elected MP for Kent in the Short Parliament. He was elected MP for New Romney for the Long Parliament in November 1640. He sat until 1648 when he was excluded under Pride's Purge.

In April 1660, Knatchbull was re-elected MP for New Romney in the Convention Parliament. He was re-elected MP for New Romney again in 1661 for the Cavalier Parliament and sat until 1679. Knatchbull was knighted, and on 4 August 1641, he was created a Baronet, of Mersham Hatch, in the County of Kent.

== Works ==
In 1659 Knatchbull published Animadversiones in Libros Novi Testamenti. Paradoxæ Orthodoxæ, London. Guil. Godbid. in vico vulgo vocato Little-Brittain, 1659. The work consists of a large number of critical emendations, based on a knowledge of Hebrew. A second edition with appendix was published in 1672, a third, Oxford, 1677; a fourth edition, in English, appeared in 1692, entitled Annotations upon some difficult Texts in all the Books of the New Testament, Cambridge, 1693; it is preceded by an Encomiastick upon the most Learned and Judicious Author, by Thomas Walker of Sidney Sussex College. The original was reprinted at Amsterdam, and also at Frankfort, where it formed part of the supplement to Nikolaus Gürtler's edition of Brian Walton's Polyglot Bible. 1695–1701. The work had a reputation for a century after its publication, and figures in a list of books annotated by Ambrose Bonwicke. John Kitto, however, found Knatchbull's remarks superficial.

In 1680, Peter du Moulin the younger dedicated to Knatchbull his Short View of the Chief Points in Controversy between the Reformed Churches and the Church of Rome, a translation from an unprinted manuscript by his father, Peter du Moulin the elder, which had been made over to him for purposes of publication by the baronet. James Duport, the tutor of his son John, addressed three Latin odes in his Musæ Subsecivæ to Knatchbull, who according to Ballard, himself acted as tutor to Dorothy, Lady Pakington.

== Family ==
Knatchbull married firstly, on 22 October 1630, Dorothy Westtrow, daughter of Thomas Westtrow, grocer and alderman of London, and had by her three sons and ten daughters, including:

- Sir John Knatchbull, 2nd Baronet
- Thomas Knatchbull, 3rd Baronet

He married secondly, on 27 November 1662, at St Martin-in-the-Fields outside London, Dorothy Honeywood, daughter of Sir Robert Honeywood, of Charing, Kent, and widow of Sir Edward Steward of Barking, Essex. By his 2nd wife he had no issue.

== Death and legacy ==
He died at Mersham Hatch on 3 February 1685 at the age of 82, and was buried in the family vault under the chancel of Mersham church. The estate passed to his eldest son, John. He was succeeded in the baronetcy, successively, by his sons John and Thomas.

The Norton Knatchbull School, situated in Ashford, was founded by his uncle and namesake, Sir Norton Knatchbull (d. 1636).

Parliament of England
Vacant Parliament suspended since 1629	Member of Parliament for Kent; 1640; With: Sir Roger Twysden, 2nd Baronet	Succeeded by Sir John Colepeper; Sir Edward Dering
Preceded by Thomas Godfrey; William Steele	Member of Parliament for New Romney; 1640–1648; With: Thomas Webb 1640–1641; Richard Browne 1641–1648	Not represented in Rump Parliament
Vacant Not represented in Rump Parliament	Member of Parliament for New Romney; 1660–1679; With: John Knatchbull 1660–1661; Charles Berkeley 1661–1665; Henry Brouncker 1665–1668; Sir Charles Sedley 1668–1679	Succeeded by Sir Charles Sedley; Paul Barret
Baronetage of England
New creation	Baronet (of Mersham Hatch); 1641–1685	Succeeded by John Knatchbull
