= Patricia Knatchbull, 2nd Countess Mountbatten of Burma =

British peeress (1924–2017)

The Right Honourable The Countess Mountbatten of Burma CBE MSC CD
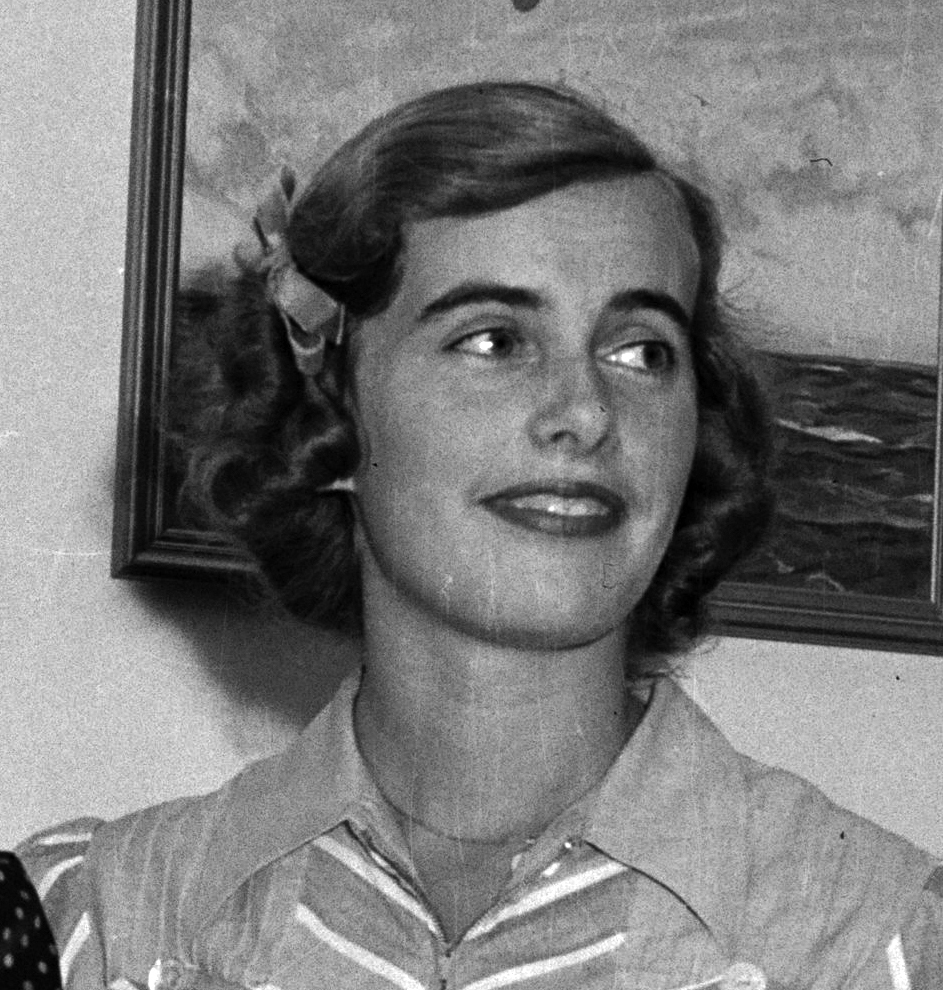
- Knatchbull in 1941

Member of the House of Lords
- Lord Temporal
- as a Hereditary peer 27 August 1979 – 11 November 1999
- Preceded by: The 1st Earl Mountbatten of Burma
- Succeeded by: Seat abolished (Note: Seat abolished by the House of Lords Act 1999.)

Personal details
- Born: Patricia Edwina Victoria Mountbatten; 14 February 1924 Westminster, London, England
- Died: 13 June 2017 (aged 93) Mersham, Kent, England
- Spouse: John Knatchbull, 7th Baron Brabourne (m. 1946; died 2005)
- Children: Norton Knatchbull, 3rd Earl Mountbatten of Burma; Hon. Michael-John Knatchbull; Hon. Anthony Knatchbull; Lady Joanna Knatchbull; Lady Amanda Ellingworth; Hon. Philip Knatchbull; Hon. Nicholas Knatchbull; Hon. Timothy Knatchbull
- Parent(s): Louis Mountbatten, 1st Earl Mountbatten of Burma; Edwina Ashley
- Military career
- Allegiance: United Kingdom
- Branch: Royal Navy
- Service years: 1943–1945
- Rank: Third officer
- Unit: Women's Royal Naval Service
- Conflicts: Second World War

Patricia Edwina Victoria Knatchbull, 2nd Countess Mountbatten of Burma, Baroness Brabourne (née Mountbatten; 14 February 1924 – 13 June 2017), was a British peeress and third cousin of Queen Elizabeth II. She was the elder daughter of Admiral of the Fleet the 1st Earl Mountbatten of Burma (formerly Prince Louis of Battenberg) and of heiress Edwina Ashley. She was the elder sister of Lady Pamela Hicks, the first cousin of Prince Philip, Duke of Edinburgh, and the last surviving baptismal sponsor to her first cousin once removed King Charles III. She was a great-great-granddaughter of Queen Victoria.

Lady Mountbatten succeeded her father as Countess Mountbatten of Burma when he was assassinated in 1979, as his peerages had been created with special remainder to his daughters and their heirs male. This inheritance accorded her a seat in the House of Lords, which she retained until 1999, when the House of Lords Act 1999 removed most hereditary peers from the House.

== Early life ==
Patricia Mountbatten was born in the St George Hanover Square parish of London in 1924, exactly two years after her father proposed to her mother in India. Her middle names were Edwina, after her mother, and Victoria, after her grandmother, the eldest daughter of Princess Alice of the United Kingdom.

Patricia was educated in Malta, England, and at the Hewitt School in New York City. In 1943, aged 19, she entered the Women's Royal Naval Service as a Signal Rating and served in Combined Operations bases in Britain, including HMS Tormentor. She was then commissioned as a third officer in 1945 and serving in the Supreme Allied Headquarters, South East Asia.

== Marriage and children ==
On 26 October 1946, she married John Knatchbull, 7th Baron Brabourne (9 November 1924 – 23 September 2005), at the time an aide to her father in the Far East. They had met after Patricia, having served in the Women's Royal Naval Service, was commissioned in 1945 as a third officer and was serving in the Supreme Allied Headquarters, South East Asia. The wedding took place at Romsey Abbey in the presence of members of the royal family. Her bridesmaids were Princess Elizabeth, Princess Margaret, Lady Pamela Mountbatten (the bride's younger sister), and Princess Alexandra, daughter of the Duke and Duchess of Kent.

Later, they became one of the few married couples each of whom held a peerage in their own right, and whose descendants inherited titles through both. They had eight children:

- Norton Louis Philip Knatchbull, 3rd Earl Mountbatten of Burma (born 8 October 1947), married Penelope Meredith Mary Eastwood (born 16 April 1953) on 20 October 1979 and have three children.
- The Hon. Michael-John Ulick Knatchbull (born 24 May 1950), producer and editor, married Melissa Clare Owen (born 12 November 1960), daughter of judge Sir John Arthur Dalziel Owen, on 1 June 1985 and had one daughter; divorced in 1997; married Susan Penelope "Penny" Jane Henderson née Coates (born 23 October 1959), daughter of Stephen Cedric Coates, a civil engineer and businessman, on 6 March 1999 and had one daughter; divorced on 13 February 2006.
- The Hon. Anthony Knatchbull (born/died 6 April 1952)
- Lady Joanna Edwina Doreen Knatchbull (born 5 March 1955), married French Baron Hubert Pernot du Breuil (2 February 1956 – 6 September 2004) on 3 November 1984 and had one daughter; divorced in 1995; married Azriel Zuckerman (born 18 January 1943 in Bucharest, Romania, and educated at the University of Oxford) on 19 November 1995 and had one son.
- Lady Amanda Patricia Victoria Knatchbull (born 26 June 1957), married Charles Vincent Ellingworth (born 7 February 1957) on 31 October 1987 and had three sons.
- The Hon. Philip Wyndham Ashley Knatchbull (born 2 December 1961), married Atalanta Vereker née Cowan (born 20 June 1962), daughter of John Cowan, on 16 March 1991 and had two daughters, including Daisy Knatchbull; married Wendy Amanda Willis née Leach (born 20 July 1966), daughter of Robin H. Leach, of Ugley Park, Ugley, Essex, on 29 June 2002 and had two sons.
- The Hon. Nicholas Timothy Charles Knatchbull (18 November 1964 – 27 August 1979), killed by an IRA bomb (see Assassination of Lord Mountbatten)
- The Hon. Timothy Nicholas Sean Knatchbull (born 18 November 1964), married Isabella Julia Norman (born 9 January 1971), a great-great-granddaughter of the 4th Earl of Bradford, on 11 July 1998 and had five children.

As Lady Brabourne during her father's lifetime, her immediate family became closely involved in the consideration of a future consort for her first cousin once removed, Charles, Prince of Wales. In early 1974, Lord Mountbatten began corresponding with the eldest son of Queen Elizabeth II and Prince Philip about a potential marriage to Lady Brabourne's daughter Amanda. Charles wrote to Lady Brabourne (who was also his godmother), about his interest in her daughter, to which she replied approvingly, though suggesting that a courtship was premature. Amanda Knatchbull declined the marriage proposal of Charles in 1980, following the assassination of her maternal grandfather.

== Activities ==
In 1973 she was appointed Deputy Lieutenant for the County of Kent; she was also a serving magistrate and was involved with numerous service organisations including SOS Children's Villages UK, of which she was a Patron; the Order of St John, of which she was a Dame; and the Countess Mountbatten's Own Legion of Frontiersmen of the Commonwealth, of which she was a Patron.

On 15 June 1974, she succeeded her distant cousin (first cousin twice removed) Lady Patricia Ramsay, formerly HRH Princess Patricia of Connaught, as Colonel-in-Chief of Princess Patricia's Canadian Light Infantry, for whom the regiment was named when Princess Patricia's father, the Duke of Connaught, was Governor General of Canada during the First World War. Despite her succeeding to an earldom in her own right as Countess Mountbatten of Burma on the death of her father in 1979, she preferred that the officers and men of her regiment address her as Lady Patricia. She was succeeded by The Right Honourable Adrienne Clarkson on 17 March 2007. On 28 August 2007, the Governor General of Canada presented her with the Canadian Meritorious Service Cross for her services as Colonel-in-Chief of Princess Patricia's Light Infantry.

Patricia was in the boat which was blown up by the IRA off the shores of Mullaghmore, County Sligo, in August 1979, killing her 14-year-old son Nicholas; her father; her mother-in-law, the Dowager Baroness Brabourne; and 15-year-old Paul Maxwell, a boat-boy from County Fermanagh. She, her husband, and their son Timothy were injured but survived the attack. Following the incident the Countess became Patron and, later, President of The Compassionate Friends, a self-help charitable organisation of bereaved parents in the UK.

In June 2012, at the time of Queen Elizabeth II's first visit to the Republic of Ireland, Countess Mountbatten said the Queen had her full support for meeting Martin McGuinness, who had been a high-ranking member of the IRA. "I think it's wonderful ... I'm hugely grateful that we have come to a point where we can behave responsibly and positively", she is reported to have said. In September 2012, she unveiled a memorial to the work of the Combined Operations Pilotage Parties at Hayling Island in Hampshire.

== Death and funeral ==
Countess Mountbatten died at her home in Mersham, Kent, on 13 June 2017, aged 93. Her funeral service took place on 27 June at St Paul's Church, Knightsbridge, and was attended by Queen Elizabeth II, Prince Philip, Duke of Edinburgh, and other senior members of the royal family. Her casket was borne by a party of pall bearers from Princess Patricia's Canadian Light Infantry, who were in London on public duties. She was buried in the Knatchbull family plot in Mersham churchyard.

== Colonelcy-in-chief ==
- Princess Patricia's Canadian Light Infantry (formerly, now The Right Honourable Adrienne Clarkson)

== Honours ==
- Dame of the Venerable Order of the Hospital of St. John of Jerusalem
- Commander of the Order of the British Empire (CBE)
- The British WW2 Defence Medal
- War Medal 1939–1945
- King George V Silver Jubilee Medal
- King George VI Coronation Medal
- Queen Elizabeth II Coronation Medal
- Queen Elizabeth II Silver Jubilee Medal
- Canadian Forces Decoration
- Meritorious Service Cross

== Arms ==
Coat of arms of Patricia Knatchbull, 2nd Countess Mountbatten of Burma
Notes The arms of the 2nd Countess Mountbatten of Burma consisted of: Crest Crests of Hesse modified and Battenberg. Helm Helms of Hesse modified and Battenberg. Escutcheon Quarterly, 1st and 4th, Hesse with a bordure compony argent and gules; 2nd and 3rd, Battenberg; charged at the honour point with an inescutcheon of the British Royal arms with a label of three points argent, the centre point charged with a rose gules and each of the others with an ermine spot sable (Princess Alice, her great grandmother). Orders The Order of the British Empire ribbon. For God & Country Other versions Arms of alliance of Lord Brabourne and Lady Mountbatten

== Bibliography ==
- Dimbleby, Jonathan (1994). The Prince of Wales: A Biography. New York: William Morrow and Company. ISBN 0-688-12996-X.

== Notes ==
Peerage of the United Kingdom
Preceded by Louis Mountbatten as Earl	Countess Mountbatten of Burma; 1979–2017; Member of the House of Lords (1979–1999)	Succeeded by Norton Knatchbull as Earl
