= Mary Sackville, Countess of Falmouth and Dorset =

The Countess of Falmouth and Dorset
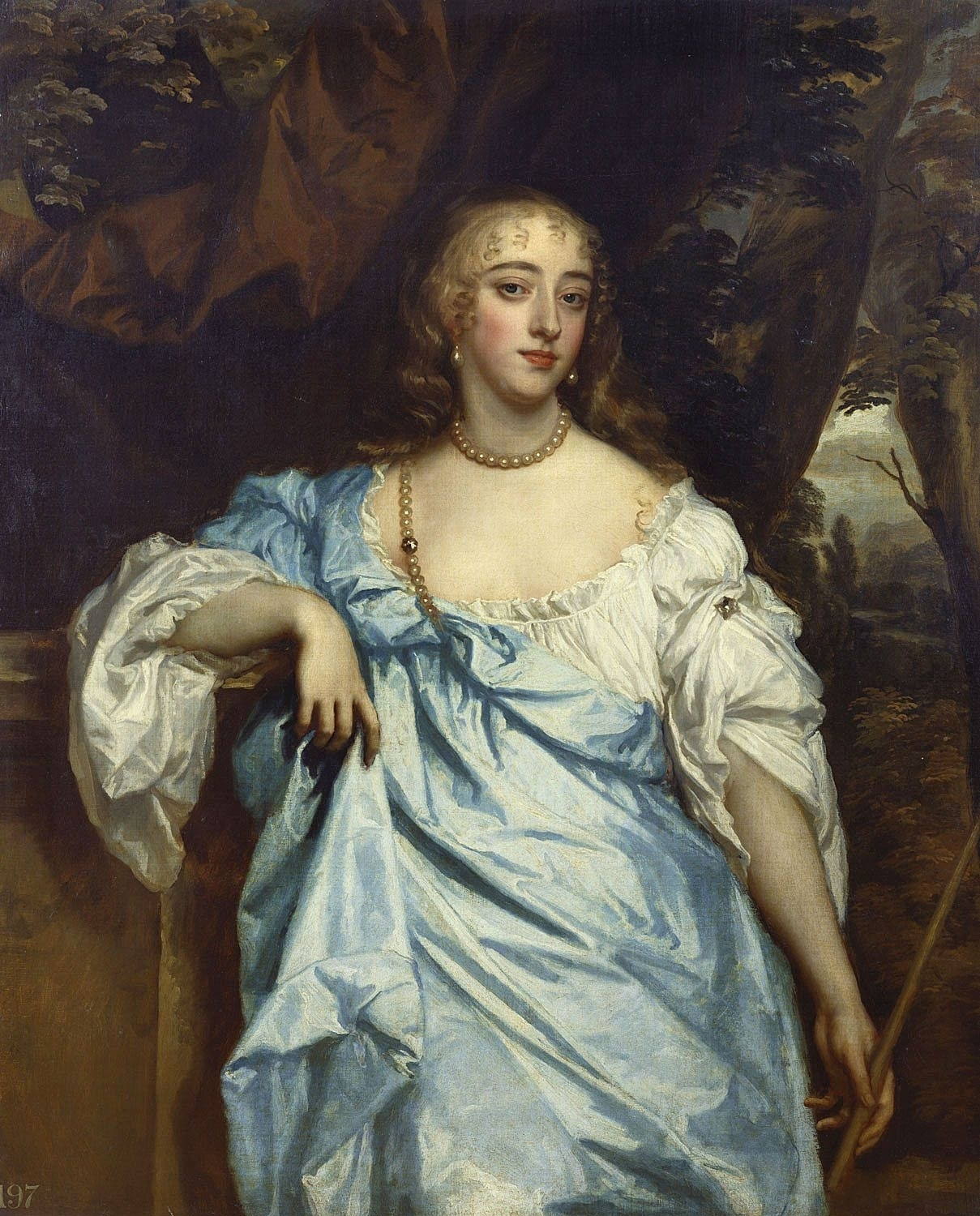
- Mary Bagot, Countess of Falmouth and Dorset, ca. 1664-65, by Sir Peter Lely.[1]
- Spouses: Charles Berkeley, 1st Earl of Falmouth; Charles Sackville, 6th Earl of Dorset
- Issue: Mary Berkeley
- Father: Colonel Henry Bagot
- Mother: Dorothea Arden

Mary Sackville, Countess of Falmouth and Dorset (1645 – 1679, née Bagot) was an English courtier and mistress of King Charles II. The King rewarded her with grants of land, including Somerset House, in the Strand, and a state pension.

== Life ==
Her parents were Colonel Henry Bagot and his wife Dorothea Arden, of Pipe Hall, Warwickshire.

She married firstly Charles Berkeley, 1st Earl of Falmouth in 1663. He died at the Battle of Lowestoft on 3 July 1665, by cannon shot.

They had one daughter:

- Mary Bagot (c. 1665 – 18 April 1693), married Gilbert Cosins Gerard (1662–1720) on 2 May 1681, divorced in 1684.

After the death of Anne Hyde, Duchess of York, in 1671, Mary was briefly considered as a possible bride for the widowed Duke of York, who later became King James II. She was discounted due to her relationship with his brother the King. James instead married Mary of Modena.

She married secondly, and secretly, Charles Sackville, 6th Earl of Dorset in June 1674, as his first wife.

Mary died in childbirth on 12 September 1679 and was buried at Withyan, Sussex.

She was one of the Windsor Beauties painted by Sir Peter Lely. Her portrait by Lely was erroneously named "Elizabeth, Countess of Falmouth" and also as "Countess of Ossory" in some portrait prints and books in the 18th and 19th centuries, many of which were later reprinted, compounding the error.
