= Norton Knatchbull, 6th Baron Brabourne =

British soldier and peer (1922–1943)

Norton Cecil Michael Knatchbull, 6th Baron Brabourne (11 February 1922 – 15 September 1943), was a British peer and soldier, the son of The 5th Baron Brabourne, Governor of Bengal.

== Early life ==
Knatchbull was educated at Eton College and the Royal Military College, Sandhurst, and served briefly as a soldier in The Buffs (The Royal East Kent Regiment) in 1940 before being commissioned into the Grenadier Guards during the Second World War.

== Capture and death ==
Lord Brabourne was wounded and captured by the Germans in Italy in 1943. On his way to captivity in Germany he tried to escape from the prison train at Bronzolo, a village in South Tyrol, together with Arnold Guy Vivian, a fellow officer in the 6th Battalion, Grenadier Guards. Both were recaptured and executed by the SS in Bronzolo on 15 September 1943.

Brabourne was buried in the Padua War Cemetery in Italy. He died unmarried, and his titles passed to his younger brother, John Knatchbull.

Peerage of the United Kingdom
Preceded by Michael Knatchbull	Baron Brabourne; 1939–1943	Succeeded by John Knatchbull
