= Mersham =

Village in Kent, England

Coordinates: 51.1187°N 0.9345°E

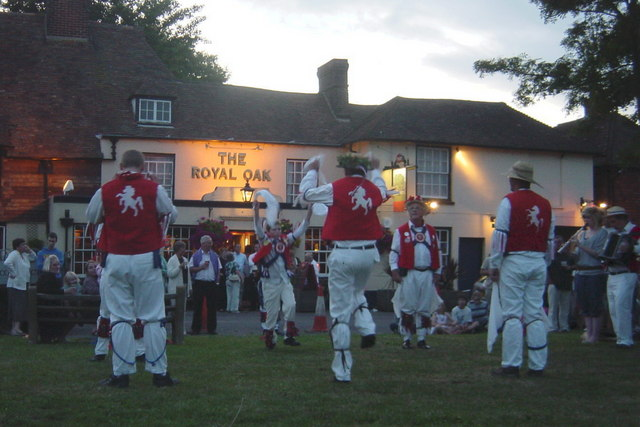
- Morris men at Mersham

- Location within Kent
- Area: 13.85 km^{2} (5.35 sq mi)
- Population: 1,124 (Civil Parish 2011)
  - Density: 81/km^{2} (210/sq mi)
- OS grid reference: TR053396
- Civil parish: Mersham
- District: Ashford
- Shire county: Kent
- Region: South East
- Country: England
- Sovereign state: United Kingdom
- Post town: Ashford
- Postcode district: TN25
- Dialling code: 01233
- Police: Kent
- Fire: Kent
- Ambulance: South East Coast
- UK Parliament: Ashford

Mersham is a mostly agricultural large village and civil parish near Ashford in Kent, England. The population of the civil parish includes the area of Cheesman's Green now known as Finberry.

== History ==
In the mid 19th century, John Marius Wilson's Imperial Gazetteer of England and Wales described Mersham in the following terms:

The village stands adjacent to the Tunbridge and Dover railway, 1½ mile NNW of Smeeth r. station, and 3½ SE of Ashford; and has a post office under Ashford and a fair on WhitFriday. The parish comprises 2,675 acres. Pop., 752. Houses, 143. The property is much subdivided.

Mersham Hatch is the seat of Sir N. J. Knatchbull, Bart.; has belonged to his family since the time of Henry VIII.; and is a red brick mansion, rebuilt in the last century. The living is a rectory in the diocese of Canterbury. Value, £632. (Note: About £65,000 today.) Patron, Oriel College, Oxford. The church is ancient but good; comprises nave, aisles, and two chancels; and contains monuments of the Hatch family. There are an endowed school with £10 a year, (Note: About £1,000 today.) and charities £61. (Note: About £6,300 today.)

Until the early 20th century Mersham was for its majority a farming and orchard-tending community with close ties to the local market town of Ashford. The small village dates back to Saxon times and is mentioned in the Domesday Book. The village was owned by the Archbishops of Canterbury for over 500 years. The Anglican church is dedicated to St. John the Baptist and is in the highest category of listed building, at Grade I. It stands on the site of a Saxon church, and is part Norman. It is thought that the village gives rise to the surname Marshman.

=== The Knatchbulls ===
The village has been the home of the Knatchbull family since the times of Henry VIII. In 1638 Sir Norton Knatchbull founded Ashford Grammar School, to which pupils were not admitted until they could read the Bible in English, he was also the member of parliament for Romney.

In the early 19th century Edward Knatchbull served in the Whig government and in 1830 another Sir Edward Knatchbull became M.P. for Romney and was given responsibility under Sir Robert Peel in his government of 1841.

Both the funeral and committal services of John Knatchbull, 7th Baron Brabourne, were held at St John the Baptist Church, Mersham after his death in 2005. When his wife, Patricia Knatchbull, 2nd Countess Mountbatten of Burma died in 2017, her funeral was held in St Paul's Church, Knightsbridge, but her committal service was at St John the Baptist. Both were private royal funerals.

== Geography ==
Most of the neighbourhood of Cheesemans Green is in the parish.

The clustered village centre is in the small percentage of the parish between High Speed 1 and the M20 motorway.

There are two water mills on the East Stour river, one of which, Swanton, is still working.

Part of Hatch Park, a mixture of medieval deer park and SSSI, is in the civil parish.

== See also ==
- Marshman
- HMS Mersham, a Ham class minesweeper
- Listed buildings in Mersham
