= Funeral of Lord Mountbatten =

1979 funeral ceremony in London

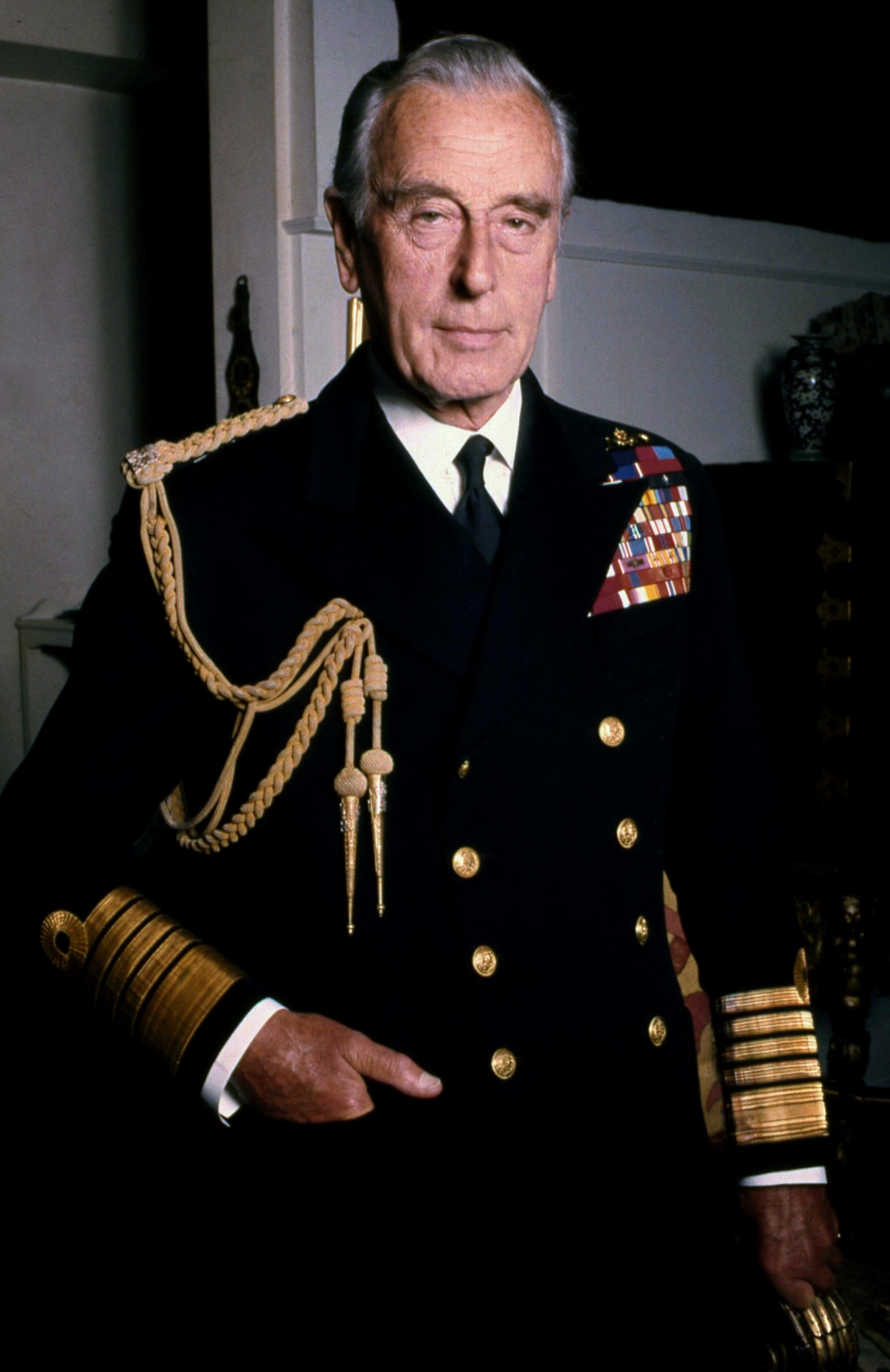
Lord Mountbatten of Burma in 1976 by Allan Warren

The ceremonial funeral of Admiral of the Fleet the 1st Earl Mountbatten of Burma took place on 5 September 1979, at Westminster Abbey following his assassination by the Provisional Irish Republican Army on Monday, 27 August 1979, off the coast of the Mullaghmore Peninsula in County Sligo, Ireland.

Lord Mountbatten's body was brought back to Great Britain after his assassination, where it briefly rested in Romsey Abbey. The day before the funeral it was brought to The Queen's Chapel, St James's Palace. On the morning of 5 September, his flag-draped coffin was carried on a gun carriage drawn by 122 Royal Navy ratings to Westminster Abbey for the ceremonial funeral.

The televised funeral service was presided over by Edward Carpenter, Dean of Westminster, with the commendation given by Donald Coggan, Archbishop of Canterbury, and clergy from several Christian denominations leading prayers. It was attended by members of Mountbatten's family, the British royal family, members of European royal houses, politicians, diplomats and military leaders from around the world.

Following the service, he was interred in Romsey Abbey.

== Planning ==
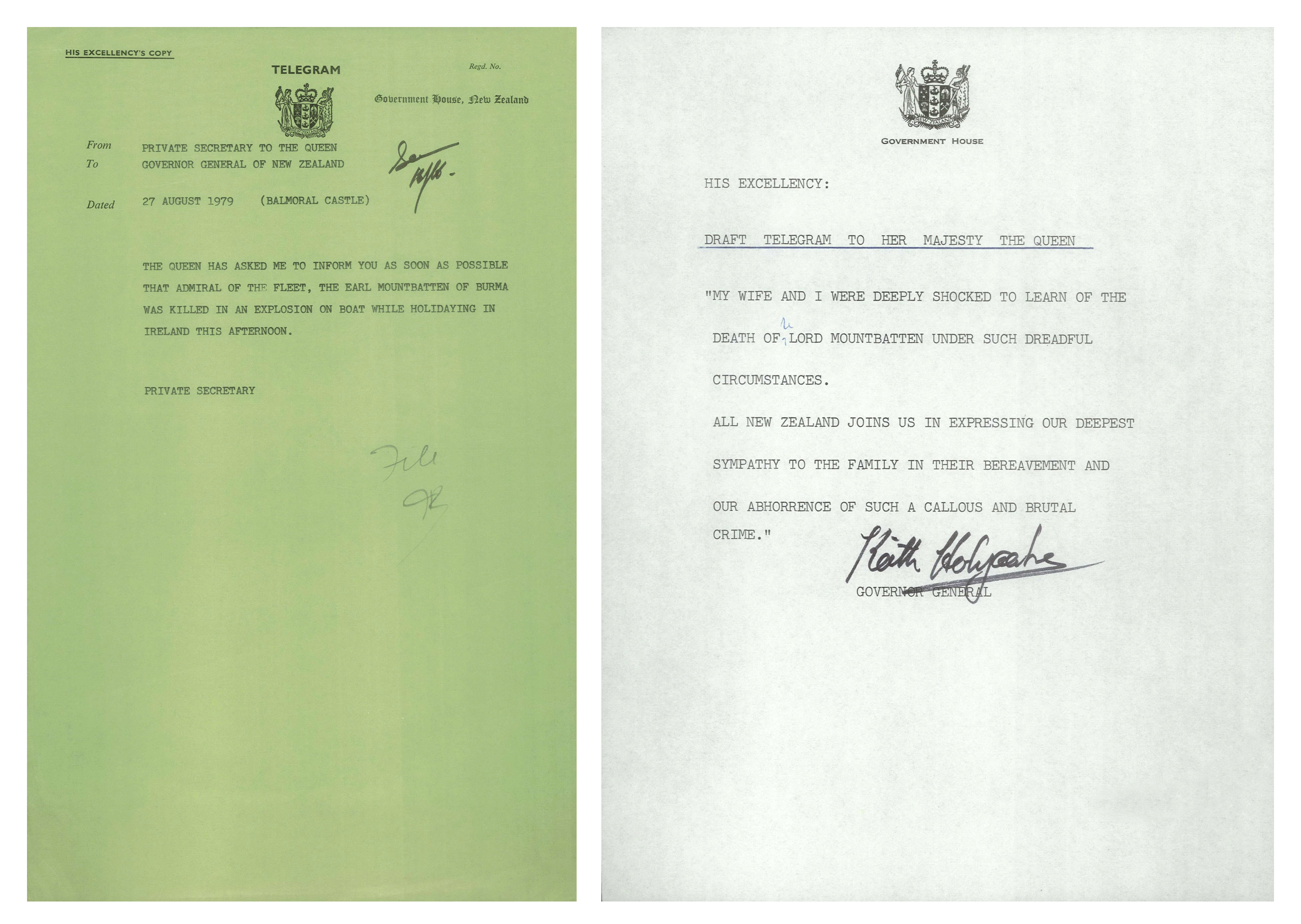
Correspondence between Sir Philip Moore, Private Secretary to the Queen, and Sir Keith Holyoake, Governor-General of New Zealand, relating to Mountbatten's death

Mountbatten himself had been heavily involved in the planning of his own funeral down to the smallest detail. He had even arranged a summer menu and a winter menu to be served on the train from London to Romsey, dependent on which season he should die in. As a royal ceremonial funeral, it was planned in consultation with the Lord Chamberlain's Office, and given the code name "Operation Freeman." He ensured all branches of the Armed Forces would be represented. The cost of the funeral was borne by both the government and Mountbatten's family.

He had originally wished to be buried alongside his parents in the Battenberg Chapel at St Mildred's Church, Whippingham, on the Isle of Wight, but later changed his mind, instead deciding to be buried in Romsey Abbey, near his home, Broadlands.

== Events preceding ==
The remains of Mountbatten were embalmed by Desmond Henley and placed in a lead-lined oak coffin. His coffin, along with Doreen, Lady Brabourne's, and Nicholas Knatchbull's were flown back to the United Kingdom arriving at Southampton Airport where they were met by the Duke of Edinburgh and the Prince of Wales. From there they were taken to Broadlands by hearse. From there, Mountbatten's coffin was taken to Romsey Abbey, where members of his staff stood vigil for two days. On 4 September, his coffin was taken to London where it lay in the Queen's Chapel, St James's Palace. Upon arriving at the chapel, Gerald Ellison, Bishop of London, and Canon Anthony Caesar, Sub-Dean of Her Majesty's Chapels Royal and Deputy Clerk of the Closet, presided over a brief service.

== Procession ==
At 10:30 AM BST on the morning of the funeral, Mountbatten's coffin, draped in the Union Flag, was borne from the Queen's Chapel on the Royal Navy State Funeral Gun Carriage. The gun carriage was drawn by 122 Royal Navy ratings, rather than horses, an honour typically reserved for state funerals, yet a detail which emphasized Mountbatten's lifelong links with the Royal Navy. His bicorne Admiral's hat, gold stick and sword of honour sat atop the coffin.

Ahead of the coffin marched the Major-General commanding the Household Division, John Swinton of Kimmerghame, six officers carried purple cushions with the insignias of his orders and decorations – including the Order of the Garter, Order of the Star of India, Legion of Honour and Legion of Merit – and the Secretary of the Central Chancery of the Orders of Knighthood, Major-General Peter Gillett. Military personnel from the United Kingdom, Canada, France, India, Burma and the United States—including 70 sailors and 50 marines—all marched. Mountbatten's charger, named Octave but nicknamed "Dolly," was lead before the coffin with his boots reversed in the stirrups.

Mountbatten's grandsons, Lord Romsey, Michael-John Knatchbull, Philip Knatchbull and Ashley Hicks, and son-in-law David Hicks walked behind the coffin, as did the Duke of Edinburgh, the Prince of Wales, the Duke of Gloucester, the Duke of Kent and Prince Michael of Kent. Members of the royal family were followed by the Chief of the Defence Staff, Admiral of the Fleet Sir Terence Lewin, and the chiefs of staff of the three branches of the armed forces, Admiral Sir Henry Leach, Field Marshal Sir Edwin Bramall and Air Chief Marshal Sir Michael Beetham. Behind them followed three senior officers representing the United States Armed Forces, three senior officers from the Burmese Army and Air Force, Elder Brethren of Trinity House, the Viscount Slim, President and Vice Chairman of the Burma Star Association, detachments of the Royal Navy Association, survivors of the HMS Kelly (which had been under Mountbatten's command), and the standards of the Royal British Legion and the Burma Star Association. A detachment of the Blues and Royals mounted squadron brought up the rear of the procession.

Eight honorary pallbearers, Sir Edward Ashmore, Sir Robert Ford, John T. Hayward, Ronald Lynsdale Pereira, Sir John Richards, Sir William Dickson, Alain de Boissieu and Chit Hlaing walked beside the coffin.

Music during the procession was provided by the Central Band of the Royal Air Force, Royal Marines Band Service, Band of the Grenadier Guards and the Band of the Coldstream Guards, and the tenor bell at Westminster Abbey tolled. The procession passed down Marlborough Road, The Mall, through Horse Guards Parade, down Whitehall, through Parliament Square and Sanctuary Road to the abbey.

== Service ==
The service began at 11:30 AM BST and was conducted by the Dean of Westminster, Edward Carpenter, according to the 1662 Book of Common Prayer. The Prince of Wales read the lesson, taken from Psalm 107: 23–26, 28–30. The commendation was given by the Archbishop of Canterbury, Donald Coggan. Prayers were said by clergy from several Christian denominations. The service lasted thirty minutes.

The music during the service was under the direction of Douglas Guest, the organist and master of the choristers of Westminster Abbey. The organ was played by the sub-organist, Christopher Herrick. The fanfare, composed by Sir Vivian Dunn, "Last Post" and "Reveille" were played by trumpeters and buglers from Royal Marines School of Music. As the coffin was carried into the abbey, William Croft's funeral sentences were sung by the choir.

The hymns sung during the service were "God of our fathers, known of old," words taken from the poem "Recessional" by Rudyard Kipling and sung to the tune "Lest We Forget" by George Frederic Blanchard, "I Vow to Thee, My Country," words by Sir Cecil Spring Rice and sung to the tune "Thaxted" by Gustav Holst, "And did those feet in ancient time," words taken from the poem "Jerusalem" by William Blake and sung to the tune of the same name by Sir Hubert Parry, and "Eternal Father, Strong to Save", words by William Whiting and sung to the tune "Melita" by John Bacchus Dykes.

The choir sang two anthems during the service; "Faire is the heaven," a setting of Edmund Spenser's poem "An Hymne of Heavenly Beautie" by Sir William Henry Harris, and "God Be in My Head," words from the Sarum Primer and music by Sir Walford Davies.

The "Dead March" from Act Three of Saul (HWV 53) by George Frideric Handel was played on the organ as the coffin was carried out of the abbey.

== Guests and participants ==
The service was attended by 1,800 invited guests. Due to the injuries they sustained in the explosion, Mountbatten's elder daughter and son-in-law, the now 2nd Countess Mountbatten of Burma and Lord Brabourne, and grandson, Timothy Knatchbull, were absent from the funeral. His younger daughter, Lady Pamela Hicks, and her family led the Mountbatten family, Queen Elizabeth II and the entire British royal family attended, as did numerous members of European royal families. It was the largest gathering of royalty in London since the funeral of King George VI in 1952. Mountbatten, who had been Supreme Allied Commander South East Asia Command and oversaw the recapture of Burma and Singapore from the Japanese in the Second World War, had requested that no representatives from Japan be invited. Notable guests in attendance and participants in the service include:

=== Mountbatten family ===
- The Countess Mountbatten of Burma's family:
  - Lord Romsey and Penelope Eastwood, Mountbatten's grandson and his fiancée
  - The Hon. Michael-John Knatchbull, Mountbatten's grandson
  - Lady Joanna Knatchbull, Mountbatten's granddaughter
  - Lady Amanda Knatchbull, Mountbatten's granddaughter
  - The Hon. Philip Knatchbull, Mountbatten's grandson
- Lady Pamela and David Hicks, Mountbatten's daughter and son-in-law
  - Edwina Hicks, Mountbatten's granddaughter
  - Ashley Hicks, Mountbatten's grandson
  - India Hicks, Mountbatten's granddaughter
- The Marchioness of Milford Haven, widow of Mountbatten's nephew
  - The Marquess of Milford Haven, Mountbatten's grandnephew
  - Lord Ivar Mountbatten, Mountbatten's grandnephew
- Lady Iris Kemp, Mountbatten's first cousin once removed

=== British royal family ===
- The Queen and the Duke of Edinburgh, Mountbatten's second cousin once removed and Mountbatten's nephew
  - The Prince of Wales, Mountbatten's grandnephew
  - The Princess Anne, Mrs Mark Phillips, and Captain Mark Phillips, Mountbatten's grandniece and her husband
  - The Prince Andrew, Mountbatten's grandnephew
  - The Prince Edward, Mountbatten's grandnephew
- Queen Elizabeth the Queen Mother, widow of Mountbatten's second cousin
  - The Princess Margaret, Countess of Snowdon, Mountbatten's second cousin once removed
- Princess Alice, Duchess of Gloucester, widow of Mountbatten's second cousin
  - The Duke and Duchess of Gloucester, Mountbatten's second cousin once removed and his wife
- The Duke and Duchess of Kent, Mountbatten's second cousin once removed and his wife
  - Earl of St Andrews, Mountbatten's second cousin twice removed
  - Lady Helen Windsor, Mountbatten's second cousin twice removed
  - Lord Nicholas Windsor, Mountbatten's second cousin twice removed
- Princess Alexandra, The Hon. Mrs Angus Ogilvy, and The Hon. Angus Ogilvy, Mountbatten's second cousin once removed and her husband
  - James Ogilvy, Mountbatten's second cousin twice removed
  - Marina Ogilvy, Mountbatten's second cousin twice removed
- Prince and Princess Michael of Kent, Mountbatten's second cousin once removed and his wife

=== Extended royal family ===
- The Earl and Countess of Harewood, Mountbatten's second cousin once removed and his wife
- The Duke of Fife, Mountbatten's second cousin once removed
- Captain Alexander Ramsay of Mar and the Lady Saltoun, Mountbatten's second cousin and his wife
- Lady May and Colonel The Hon. Sir Henry Abel Smith, Mountbatten's second cousin and her husband
- Lady Mary Whitley, Mountbatten's fourth cousin
- The Duke and Duchess of Beaufort, Mountbatten's third cousin once removed and her husband

=== Ashley family ===
- Mary, Lady Delamere, Mountbatten's sister-in-law
- Marjorie, Countess of Brecknock, Mountbatten's cousin-in-law

=== Foreign royalty ===
==== Members of reigning royal families ====
- The King of Norway
- The King and Queen of Sweden
- Princess Margaretha, Mrs John Ambler, and John Ambler
- The Grand Duke and Grand Duchess of Luxembourg
- The Prince and Princess of Liechtenstein
- The Prince and Princess of Monaco
- Prince Bernhard of the Netherlands (representing his wife, the Queen of the Netherlands)
  - Princess Beatrix of the Netherlands
- The Prince of Liège (representing his brother, the King of the Belgians)
- The Count of Barcelona (representing his son, the King of Spain)
- Prince Georg of Denmark (representing his cousin, the Queen of Denmark)
- Prince Ra'ad Zeid Al Hashimi of Jordan (representing his cousin, the King of Jordan)

==== Members of non-reigning royal families ====
- King Michael I and Queen Anne of Romania
- Tsar Simeon II of Bulgaria
- King Umberto II of Italy
  - Princess Maria Gabriella of Savoy
- King Constantine II and Queen Anne-Marie of the Hellenes
- Princess and Prince George William of Hanover, Mountbatten's niece and her husband
  - Princess Friederike of Hanover, Mountbatten's grandniece
- The Prince and Princess of Hohenlohe-Langenburg, Mountbatten's grandnephew and his wife
- Prince and Princess Andreas of Hohenlohe-Langenburg, Mountbatten's grandnephew and his wife
- The Hereditary Prince of Hesse
- The Princess of Hesse and by Rhine
- Crown Prince Alexander of Yugoslavia
- Prince Tomislav of Yugoslavia
  - Prince Nikola of Yugoslavia, Mountbatten's grandnephew
  - Princess Katarina of Yugoslavia, Mountbatten's grandniece
- Prince Andrew of Yugoslavia
- The Margrave and Margravine of Baden, Mountbatten's grandnephew and his wife
- Prince and Princess Ludwig of Baden, Mountbatten's grandnephew and his wife
- Prince Dimitri Romanov of Russia
- Prince Andrew Romanov of Russia

=== British politicians ===
- Margaret Thatcher, Prime Minister of the United Kingdom, and Denis Thatcher
- James Callaghan, former Prime Minister of the United Kingdom
- Sir Harold Wilson, former Prime Minister of the United Kingdom, and Lady Wilson
- Edward Heath, former Prime Minister of the United Kingdom
- The Lord Home of the Hirsel, former Prime Minister of the United Kingdom
- Harold Macmillan, former Prime Minister of the United Kingdom
- The Baroness Phillips, Lord Lieutenant of Greater London
- Sir Kenneth Cork, Lord Mayor of London, and the Lady Mayoress
- Reginald Forrester, Lord Mayor of Westminster, and the Lady Mayoress

=== Foreign representatives ===
- Sir Zelman Cowen, Governor-General of Australia, and Lady Cowan
- Sir Roden Cutler, Governor of New South Wales, and Lady Cutler
- Maung Maung Kha, Prime Minister of the Socialist Republic of the Union of Burma
- Roland Michener, former Governor General of Canada, and Norah Michener
- Alain Peyrefitte, Keeper of Seals and Minister of Justice of the French Republic
- Hans-Jochen Vogel, Minister of Justice of the Federal Republic of Germany
- Jack Lynch, Taoiseach of the Republic of Ireland, and Máirín Lynch
- Brigadier Duncan MacIntyre, Minister of Agriculture of New Zealand
- The Hon. Ronnie de Mel, Minister of Finance of the Democratic Socialist Republic of Sri Lanka
- Captain Nurul Huq, Minister of Shipping and Ports of the People's Republic of Bangladesh
- The Hon. W. Averell Harriman, former Ambassador of the United States to the Court of St James's, and Pamela Harriman
- Roberto Ducci, Ambassador of the Italian Republic to the Court of St James's

=== Royal household ===
- The Lord Maclean, Lord Chamberlain of the Household
- The Duke of Northumberland, Lord Steward of the Household, and the Duchess of Northumberland

=== Military figures ===
- Colonel The Viscount Slim, President of the Burma Star Association

=== Religious figures ===
- Donald Coggan, Archbishop of Canterbury
- George Simms, Archbishop of Armagh
- Edward Carpenter, Dean of Westminster
- Roger Job, Precentor and Sacrist of Westminster Abbey
- Basil O'Ferrall, Chaplain of the Fleet and Archdeacon for the Royal Navy
- Prof. Robin Barbour, Moderator of the General Assembly of the Church of Scotland
- Raymond George, Moderator of the National Free Church Federal Council
- Basil Hume, Cardinal Archbishop of Westminster
- Bruno Heim, Apostolic Delegate to Great Britain

=== Pallbearers ===
- Admiral of the Fleet Sir Edward Ashmore, former First Sea Lord
- General Sir Robert Ford, Adjutant-General to the Forces
- Admiral John T. Hayward
- Admiral Ronald Lynsdale Pereira, Chief of the Naval Staff of the Indian Navy
- Lieutenant General Sir John Richards, Commandant General Royal Marines
- Marshal of the Royal Air Force Sir William Dickson, former Chief of the Defence Staff
- Général Alain de Boissieu, former Chief of Staff of the French Army
- Rear Admiral Chit Hlaing, Commander-in-Chief of the Burmese Navy

=== Other notable guests ===
- The Duke and Duchess of Norfolk
- The Marquess and Marchioness of Cholmondeley
- The Marquess and Marchioness of Abergavenny
- Cary Grant
- Vijaya Lakshmi Pandit
- General Albert Coady Wedemeyer

== Interment and subsequent events ==
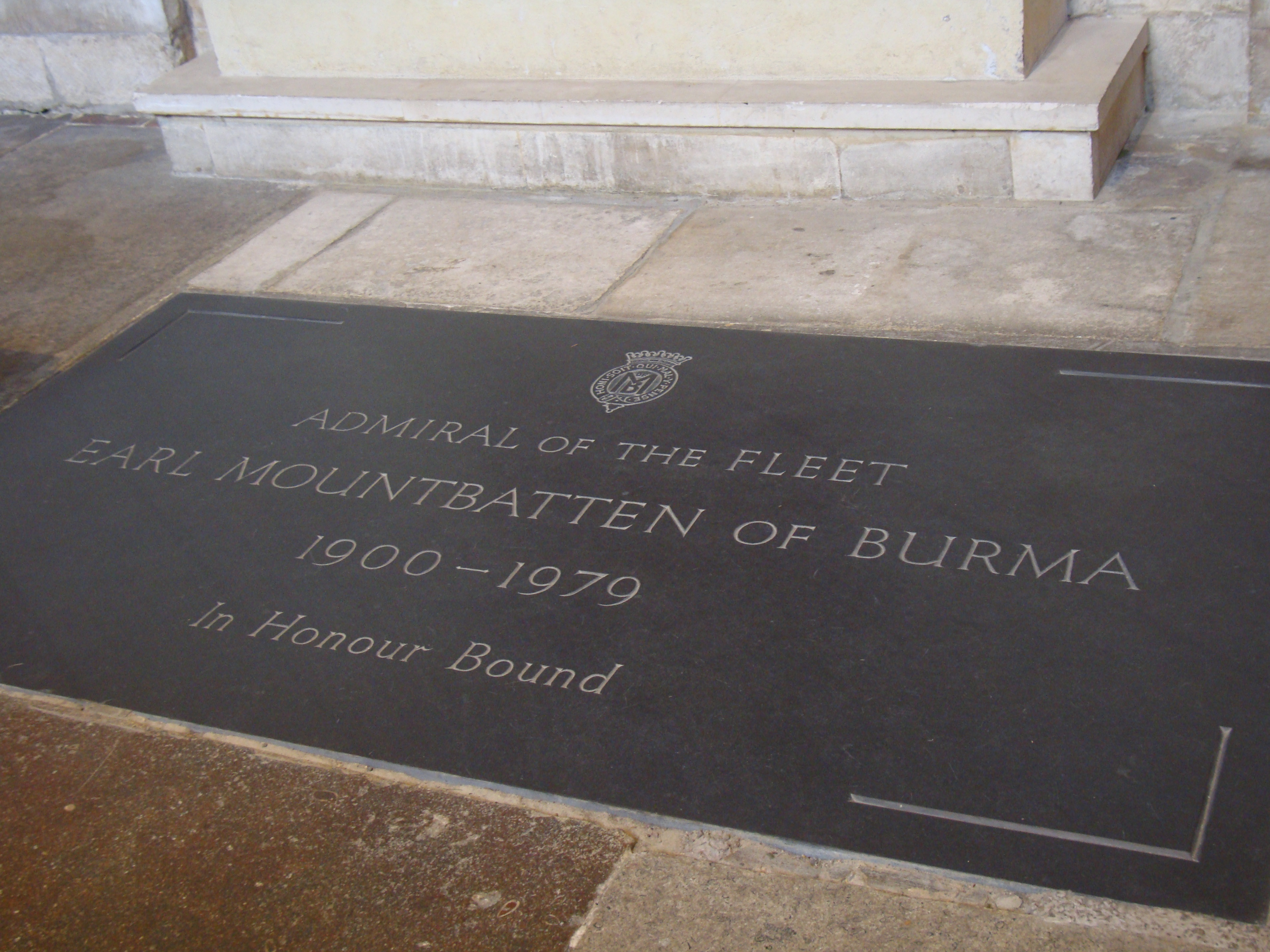
Mountbatten's tomb in Romsey Abbey

From the abbey, the coffin was taken to Waterloo Station on a Land Rover 101 Forward Control of the Life Guards, a regiment of which Mountbatten had been colonel, led by six armoured reconnaissance cars. From Waterloo, his coffin was taken by special train to Romsey, Hampshire, near Broadlands, Mountbatten's home.

Mountbatten's remains were interred in Romsey Abbey. Per his wishes, his tomb was aligned north–south, rather than the conventional east–west, so that it faced the sea where his wife Edwina was buried.

The following day, 6 September, a private family funeral for Nicholas Knatchbull and Doreen, Lady Brabourne, was held at St John the Baptist Church in Mersham, Kent, near Newhouse, the Knatchbull's family seat. It was attended by 500 guests including the Duke of Edinburgh and the Prince of Wales. This service was conducted by the Archbishop of Canterbury, Donald Coggan, assisted by the Bishop of Maidstone, Richard Third.

A memorial service for victims of the bombing which killed Mountbatten was held on Thursday, 27 December 1979 at St Paul's Cathedral. Lady Mountbatten, Lord Brabourne, and Timothy Knatchbull, who were unable to present at the funeral due to their injuries, were present for this service, the former two on crutches.

== In popular culture ==
The events of Mountbatten's assassination and funeral are portrayed in "Gold Stick," the first episode of the fourth series of the Netflix original historical drama series, The Crown.
