= Little Green =

Little Green may refer to:

- Little Green (song), by Joni Mitchell
- Little Green (book), a book by Walter Mosley
- The athletic teams of Manchester Central High School, New Hampshire, United States, or the name of its student newspaper
- Several places in England and Wales:
  - Little Green, Richmond, London, an open space
  - Little Green, Cambridgeshire
  - Little Green, Greater Manchester, near Middleton
  - Little Green, Nottinghamshire, a village green and hamlet
  - Little Green, Somerset
  - Little Green, Burgate, Suffolk, a hamlet
  - Little Green, Gislingham, Suffolk, a hamlet
  - Little Green, Wrexham
  - Little Green, Surrey
- Little Green Island (disambiguation)

== See also ==
- Little Green Men (disambiguation)
- Little Greene, British paint company
