= Angelica Hicks =

British illustrator and internet personality

- Born: 16 September 1992 (age 34)
- Occupations: Illustrator; TikToker
- Parents: Ashley Hicks; Allegra Tondato
- Relatives: Mountbatten family

TikTok information
- Page: angelicahacks
- Followers: 694.4K
- Last updated: 2 February 2026
- Website: angelicahicks.com

Angelica Margherita Edwina Hicks (born 16 September 1992) is a British fashion illustrator and internet personality. In 2017, she released the fashion illustration book Tongue in Chic. As the great-granddaughter of Louis Mountbatten, 1st Earl Mountbatten of Burma, she is a relative of the British royal family and is included in the line of succession to the British throne.

== Early life and family ==
Hicks was born on 16 September 1992 to Marina Allegra Federica Silvia Tondato, an Italian designer, and Ashley Louis David Hicks, a British artist and interior designer. Her parents divorced in 2009. Her mother later married the Italian nobleman and sailor Roberto Mottola di Amato and her father later married the American fashion editor Kata de Solis.

Hicks' paternal grandparents were the English interior decorator and designer David Nightingale Hicks and Lady Pamela Mountbatten, who served as a bridesmaid and as a lady-in-waiting to Elizabeth II. Through her grandmother, Hicks is a relative of the Mountbatten family, itself a branch of the German princely Battenberg family, and a relative of the British royal family. She is included in the line of succession to the British throne. Hicks' great-grandparents, Louis Mountbatten, 1st Earl Mountbatten of Burma and The Honourable Edwina Ashley, served as the Viceroy and Vicereine of India. She is a great-great-granddaughter of Prince Louis of Battenberg (later the 1st Marquess of Milford Haven) and Princess Victoria of Hesse and by Rhine, a granddaughter of Queen Victoria.

Hicks grew up in Chelsea, London and was educated at a boarding school. She studied art history in London.

== Career ==
Hicks works as a visual artist and fashion illustrator. She partnered with the Italian luxury fashion house Gucci in 2017 to create a line of eleven t-shirts. For the occasion, she unveiled two murals, one in New York City and another in Milan, and created a Snapchat filter to promote the collection. In March 2017, she released a fashion illustration book titled Tongue in Chic through Laurence King Publishing.

Hicks also made commissioned pieces for the American fashion designer Tory Burch and illustrated for the magazines Elle and Porter.

In 2021, Hicks launched a TikTok channel where she parodies haute couture outfits from red carpet events and fashion shows, recreating them out of duct tape, trash bags, metallic wrappers, foil, candy, and other materials. Her recreations included a Louis Vuitton tank dress worn by Emma Corrin on the cover of Vogue, which she made out of multigrain crackers, a Schiaparelli couture cape that she made out of a white mattress cover, and Cagole boots by Balenciaga that she made out of duct tape. Her channel went viral in March 2022, after she made a video recreating a Schiaparelli dress worn by Maggie Gyllenhaal at the 94th Academy Awards. By July 2022, Hicks amassed over 48,000 followers and her videos collectively received over 4 million likes. Her videos led to Hicks collaborating with Valentino and Vogue Italia. By September 2022, Hicks had over 86,000 followers on TikTok.

== Personal life ==
Hicks resides in Carroll Gardens in Brooklyn, New York.

Lines of succession
Preceded by Ashley Hicks	Succession to the British throne descended from Alice, daughter of Victoria	Succeeded by Ambrosia Hicks
