= David Akiba =

American photographer and educator (1940–2019)

- Born: David Cohen; October 7, 1940; Boston, Massachusetts
- Died: August 24, 2019 (aged 78)
- Education: University of Massachusetts Amherst (BA); Rhode Island School of Design (MFA)
- Employers: Babson College; Emerson College; New England School of Photography
- Known for: Landscape photography
- Notable work: Through the Lens: A Separate Journey

David Akiba (October 7, 1940 – August 24, 2019) was an American photographer and educator who lived and worked in Boston, best known for his landscape photography.

== Early life ==
His name at birth was David Cohen, but when he was a young man he changed his name because there was already a photographer with that name. He was born in Boston but grew up in Winthrop, Massachusetts.

=== Education ===
He received his undergraduate degree from the University of Massachusetts Amherst in 1961. He began making photographs in 1969. He went on to study with Harry Callahan and Aaron Siskind at the Rhode Island School of Design, and he received a Master's in Fine Arts from there in 1973.

== Career ==
He worked in several formats both in documentary style and in manipulated imagery when he re-photographed his own photographs and then used copy machines to create distortions that heightened the emotional content of the photograph.

In 1985, Akiba received a MassProductions grant to photograph the Frederick Law Olmsted’s Emerald Necklace park system for two years, which led to a series of related exhibitions once the work was completed.

In 2005, Akiba completed the work Through the Lens: A Separate Journey. This work is a photographic diary of his son Jonah becoming a Hassidic Jew after being raised in a non-religious household and it shows the impact this transformation has had on David and his son Daniel. A few years prior, Daniel had created a critically acclaimed short documentary called My Brother's Wedding, which featured some of his father David Akiba's photographs. They held several joint exhibitions of David's family photos alongside screenings of the video.

His work has been exhibited widely at galleries in Boston and around the world, and is part of several permanent collections including in the collections of the Boston Museum of Fine Art, Fogg Art Museum, Center for Creative Photography, DeCordova Museum, Brooklyn Museum and others.

Akiba's photographs of the MBTA were included in the photo book, Images of Rail: Boston’s Orange Line. These photographs were from 1985, when he was selected to be one of five photographers who photographed the Elevated Orange Line between Forest Hills and downtown Boston before its 1988 planned demolition.

Akiba's work is included in Sinclair Hitchings's Art in Boston project which is part art collection and part research reference library for Boston-based art.

He taught part-time at Babson College, Emerson College, and the New England School of Photography.

== Personal life ==
David had six children from two marriages. He lived in Jamaica Plain neighborhood of Boston with his wife Jane (née Levin). Jane is a portrait photographer and also teaches at Emerson College.

David's son, Isaac Akiba, was a member of the Boston Ballet, becoming the first person from Boston's public school dance program to join the elite ballet troupe. David created a photo series inspired by the dancers.
