= Kuni Takahashi =

Japanese Photojournalist

Kuni Takahashi (高橋 邦典, Takahashi Kuninori; born 1966) is a photojournalist.

== Life and work ==
Originally from Sendai, Japan, Takahashi came to the United States to study photojournalism at the Maine Photo Workshops, the New England School of Photography in Boston and the Eddie Adams Workshop in New York. He joined the Chicago Tribune as a staff photographer in 2004 after spending eight years as a staff photographer at the Boston Herald. He relocated to Mumbai, India, in 2009.

Takahashi has covered major domestic and international events, such as the struggle of Liberians caught up in 14 years of civil war in 2003 and documenting impoverished Illinois families in 2007.

== Awards ==
- Boston Press Photographers Association - Photographer of the Year 1996, 2003.
- New England AP News Executives Association contest - First Place Portrait, 2000.
- Boston Press Photographers Association annual contest - First Place Spot News, 2000, 1999.
- Pictures of the Year (POY) - Award of Excellence, 2000, 1994.
- Kyoichi Sawada Award - Eddie Adams "Assignment : Iraq" contest, 2003.
- Associated Press Member Showcase - Picture of the Year 2003.
- Atlanta Photojournalism Seminar - First Place News Picture Story, 2003.
- Northern Short Course contest - Best of Show, 2003.
- World Press Photo contest - Third Place Spot News, 2003.
- National Press Photographers Association's Pictures of the Year contest - Second Place Conflict Picture Story.
- National Headliner Awards - First Place & Best of Show in Photography, 2003.
- National Headliner Awards – Third Place Photostory, 2007.
- Pictures of the Year (POY) – Third Place Photographer of the Year, 2007.
- National Press Photographers Association's Pictures of the Year contest - Third Place Photographer of the Year, 2008.
- National Press Photographers Association: Photojournalist of the Year (large markets) - Third Place, 2009.
- Special Jury Prize (with seven others), Days Japan International Photojournalism Awards, 2010.
