= Top Design =

American reality television series

Top Design is an American reality television series. Interior designers competed to win cash and receive a spot in New York's Designer showcases. The first season premiered on January 31, 2007, following the season finale of Top Chef. Todd Oldham was the host, while famed potter and interior designer Jonathan Adler was lead judge. Kelly Wearstler and Margaret Russell also served as judges. Matt Lorenz was declared the winner. Although the first season received poor ratings, Bravo decided to air a second season starting September 3, 2008, with India Hicks as host and Oldham serving in the role of mentor, similar to Tim Gunn on Project Runway. Adler, Wearstler, and Russell returned as judges.

== Format ==
There are two challenges each episode. The first challenge, the Pop Design, is a short challenge that awards immunity. Unlike other Bravo reality competition shows where these challenges take place at the beginning of the episode, the "Pop Design" can come at any time to frustrate the designers. The second challenge, the Elimination Challenge, has each contestant, either individually or as part of a team, create a design based on certain requirements or goals. After the challenge, the judges ask questions of the contestants about their design choices. The judges then confer among themselves and decide on the top and bottom designs. The top designers are credited and a single winning stylist is selected. The bottom designer is then identified and sent home with the phrase "See you later, decorator" in Season One and "We cannot live with your design" in Season Two.

== Season one ==
The first season of Top Design premiered on January 31, 2007. Todd Oldham hosted, and Jonathan Adler, Kelly Wearstler, and Margaret Russell served as judges. Twelve contestants competed and Matt Lorenz was declared the winner of season 1 on April 11, 2007. Season one was produced by Stone & Company Entertainment.

=== Contestants ===
- Andrea Keller, 36 Los Angeles, California
- Carisa Perez-Fuentes, 26, New York City, New York
- Elizabeth Moore, 48, Los Angeles, California
- Erik Kolacz, 28, Chicago, Illinois
- Felicia Bushman, 38, Los Angeles, California
- Goil Amornvivat, 33, New York City, New York
- Heather Ashton, 36, Los Angeles, California
- John Gray, 40, Chicago, Illinois
- Lisa Turner, 58, Los Angeles, California
- Matt Lorenz, 32, Chicago, Illinois
- Michael Adams, 23, New York City, New York
- Ryan Humphrey, 35, New York City, New York

=== Contestant progress ===
Episode Progress
Designer	1	2	3	4	5	6	7	8	9	10	Comments
Matt	HIGH	IN	LOW	HIGH	IN	WIN	HIGH	WIN	WIN	WINNER	Winner of Top Design
Carisa	IN	HIGH	IN	WIN	LOW	HIGH	LOW	HIGH	HIGH	OUT	Runner Up: Lofty Designs
Andrea	IN	IN	WIN	IN	WIN	LOW	WIN	LOW	OUT		Eliminated: Elle Decor Cover Inspiration
Goil	WIN	HIGH	IN	IN	IN	LOW	LOW	OUT			Eliminated: Metropolitan Home Suites
Michael	LOW	LOW	WIN	IN	LOW	HIGH	OUT				Eliminated: Chef's Choice
Erik	IN	WIN	IN	IN	IN	OUT					Eliminated: Life of the Party
Ryan	IN	LOW	LOW	LOW	OUT						Eliminated: Garage Band
Felicia	HIGH	IN	WIN	OUT							Eliminated: One Man's Trash
Elizabeth	WIN	IN	OUT								Eliminated: Life's a Beach
John	LOW	OUT									Eliminated: Child's Play
Heather	OUT										Eliminated: Mystery Judge
Lisa	OUT										Eliminated: Mystery Judge

Green background and WIN means the designer won Top Design.
Dark Blue Background and WIN means this designer won this week's challenge.
Light Blue Background and HIGH means this designer was close to winning this week's challenge.
Pink Background and LOW means this designer had one of the least liked designs.
Orange Background and LOW means this designer was close to being eliminated.
Red Background and OUT means this designer lost and is out of the competition.

=== Episodes ===
==== Episode 1: Mystery Judge ====
Original Airdate: January 31, 2007 The contestants worked in teams of two to design a room for a mystery judge based on five personal items the judge feels represents them. Heather and Lisa did not get along, as Lisa insisted on planning the entire room herself, to which Heather reluctantly acquiesced. John and Michael took an instant dislike to one another, as Michael felt John was too harsh on him, and John felt Michael was too prissy. The mystery judge was Alexis Arquette. Winners: Goil and Elizabeth
Out: Heather and Lisa

==== Episode 2: Child's Play ====
Original Airdate: February 7, 2007 The contestants were assigned to design a room on an $8000 budget and were given a fact sheet about each client, who they later learned were pre-teens. For an excursion to Target to shop for more accessories, they each received an additional $300, except for Elizabeth and Goil who, as winners of the last competition, received $400 each. Despite initial misgivings about Carisa's design with a desk built into the foot of the bed (one judge remarked that an active boy could easily hurt himself on the rough edges), her design was named one of the best that night. Goil's design, with a bed equipped to roll away inside the wall when not in use, and a crawl space for the child to hide if he so chose, was also liked by the judges. Erik's design, revolved around a wooden "pirate ship" (the client he had expressed an interest in pirates), won top prize. Due to John not finishing his work on time he was eliminated. Winner: Erik
Out: John

==== Episode 3: Life's a Beach ====
Original Airdate: February 14, 2007 At the beginning of the episode, each contestant were given a bag of trinkets including postcards depicting Miami, Tahiti, and St. Tropez. Elizabeth, Erik and Matt got the Miami postcard, Andrea, Felicia and Michael got the Tahiti postcard, and Carisa, Goil and Ryan got the St. Tropez postcard. Their mission was to build a cabana inspired by the postcard in 16 hours, with resources from Pier One Imports only. Since Erik won the last competition, he could not be eliminated during this challenge. This worried Matt, as he could be eliminated a lot easier being on a team with only two viable targets as opposed to three. During the judging process, the judges noted that all the teams had made both progress and bad decisions. The Miami team was criticized for use of colors deemed too ugly and "not Miami," the Tahiti team was chastised for not having a roof, and the St. Tropez team was told its furniture was at odds with the structure. The Tahiti team as selected as winners of the challenge. They earned a weekend at the Viceroy Resort in Santa Monica, California, and private use of a cabana designed by judge Kelly Wearstler. The Miami team was liked least. Elizabeth was eliminated for selecting the color the judges disliked. Winners: Andrea, Felicia and Michael (Team Tahiti)
Out: Elizabeth

==== Episode 4: One Man's Trash ====
Original Airdate: February 21, 2007 The designers had to design a room for a design student with furniture purchased at garage sales. The winner was given first choice of carpenters in the next challenge. Winner: Carisa
Out: Felicia

==== Episode 5: Garage Band ====
Original Airdate: February 28, 2007' The designers were assigned to an All-American family - two parents, three children, and a dog - to create a dream family space in their garage. Andrea, with the top design for the model she prepared for the family, was made team leader of the project, with a budget of $5100 and one day to complete. Winner: Andrea
Out: Ryan

==== Episode 6: Life of the Party ====
Original Airdate: March 7, 2007 The designers had to design a party tent in teams, with Carisa, Michael, and Matt on one and Andrea, Erik, and Goil on the other. They were required to decorate using lemons (along with other supplies). Carisa, Michael, and Matt were chosen for the better design. Matt was chosen as the winner and was allowed an extra hour in the next challenge. This upset Carisa, who claimed the design was entirely hers and she should have won the challenge.

Winner: Matt
Out: Erik

==== Episode 7: Chef's Choice ====
Original Airdate: March 14, 2007 The challenge was to design a chef's room for Tom Colicchio's new restaurant, which features dishes made from the highest-quality natural ingredients. The designers were to adhere to a design aesthetic associated with the Arts and Crafts movement and featuring handcrafted, natural items. Winner: Andrea
Out: Michael

==== Episode 8: Metropolitan Home Suites ====
Original Airdate: March 28, 2007 The remaining four designers were each assigned one of the four basic elements. Matt was assigned water, Andrea received earth, Carissa was given air, and Goil was given fire. Utilizing the assigned themes, the designers were given three days to design a luxury hotel suite. The judges felt that Goil concentrated too much on the walls and let go of the big picture, although they admitted that Goil was assigned the most difficult theme and Matt, the easiest. Winner: Matt
Out: Goil

==== Episode 9 : ELLE DECOR Cover Inspiration ====
Original Airdate: April 4, 2007 The remaining contestants selected one of ten Elle Decor magazine covers as inspiration for their design. They were given access to the internet to search for shops selling at low rates. The judges felt that Andrea's design was too flat and level, and thus she was eliminated. Winner: Matt
Out: Andrea

==== Episode 10 : Lofty Designs (Finale) ====
Original Airdate: April 11, 2007 The final two contestants were allotted two months to design lofts in Los Angeles, based on their own taste and style, and five days to execute their plans. Winner: Matt
Runner-up: Carisa

- Matt is the First person to win 3 challenges in a row.

== Season two ==
The second season of Top Design premiered on September 3, 2008. India Hicks took Todd Oldham's spot as the host, with Oldham returning as the designers' mentor throughout the series. Head judge Jonathan Adler, as well as Kelly Wearstler and Margaret Russell, return as the judges. Nathan Thomas was named the Season 2 winner. He won $100,000 and a spread in Elle Décor. Season two is produced by Magical Elves, the production company that created Project Runway and Top Chef, the shows on which Top Design's format is based. Also, Magical Elves' Dan Cutforth and Jane Lipsitz will also serve as executive producers for season two.

=== Contestants ===
- Andrea Schroder, 36, Calgary, Canada
- Eddie Ross, 30, Greenwich, Connecticut
- Natalie Williams, 24, Montgomery, Alabama
- Nathan Thomas, 30, Denver, Colorado
- Ondine Karady, 38, Mountainside, New Jersey
- Preston Lee, 27, Amarillo, Texas
- Serge Van Lian, 27, Los Angeles, California
- Jennifer Newsom, 28, Minneapolis, Minnesota
- Robert Reid, 40, Fredericton, New Brunswick
- Kerry Howard, 40, Easley, South Carolina
- Shazia Kirmani, 30, Plano, Texas
- Teresa Keegan, 35, Tulsa, Oklahoma
- Wisit Prapong, 30, Gibson City, Illinois

=== Contestant progress ===
Episode Progress
Designer	1	2	3	4	5	6	7	8	9	10	Comments
Nathan	WIN	HIGH	LOW	IN^{1}	WIN	HIGH	HIGH	HIGH	LOW	WINNER	Winner of Top Design 2
Preston	LOW	LOW	HIGH	LOW	IN	HIGH	WIN	WIN	HIGH	OUT	Eliminated: Finale Part 2
Ondine	WIN	LOW	WIN	IN	IN	IN	LOW	LOW^{3}	HIGH	OUT	Eliminated: Finale Part 2
Eddie	HIGH	WIN	IN	IN	IN	WIN	HIGH	IN	OUT		Eliminated: Finale Part 1
Andrea	HIGH	WIN	HIGH	WIN	LOW	IN	LOW	WD^{3}			Withdrew: Light It Up
Natalie	IN	IN	WIN	IN	HIGH^{2}	LOW	OUT				Eliminated: Room Of The Future
Wisit	WIN	HIGH	LOW	WIN	IN	OUT					Eliminated: Eco-Offices
Teresa	WIN	IN	IN	WIN	OUT						Eliminated: Triathlon of Decorating
Shazia	LOW	IN	LOW	OUT							Eliminated: Bachelor Pads
Kerry	IN	IN	OUT								Eliminated: Window Display
Robert	LOW	OUT									Eliminated: Artsy Bunker
Jennifer	HIGH	OUT									Eliminated: Artsy Bunker
Serge	OUT										Eliminated: Impress The Best

- ^1 Nathan was part of the trio with the worst design, but he was spared from possible elimination by winning the Pop Design earlier in the episode
- ^2 While Nathan won the challenge overall (including the 1st and 2nd leg of the design triathlon), Natalie won the 3rd leg and a spread in Elle Decor magazine.
- ^3 Ondine actually had the lowest scores in the challenge and would have been eliminated had Andrea decided not to withdraw.

Green background and WIN means the designer won Top Design.
Blue background and WIN means the designer won that challenge.
Light blue background and HIGH means the designer had one of the highest scores for that challenge, but did not win.
Orange background and LOW means the designer had a lower score, but was not eliminated.
Red background and OUT means the designer lost and was out of the competition.
Yellow background and WD means the designer withdrew from the competition.

=== Episode Guide ===
==== Episode 1: Impress the Best ====
The thirteen designers were divided into four groups. Each of the groups was assigned to design an apartment for one of the judges. The team with four members was given less time than the teams with three. A Pop Design was given, in which the designers created a shadow box that represented their design sensibility. Wisit, Ondine, Eddie, and Kerry were given immunity for winning the Pop Design. Serge was eliminated.

- Top Design: Nathan, Ondine, Teresa and Wisit
- Eliminated: Serge

==== Episode 2: Artsy Bunker ====
Twelve designers were divided into groups of two assigned to design a small bomb shelter in a way that combined both their styles.

- Top Design: Eddie and Andrea
- Eliminated: Robert and Jennifer

==== Episode 3: Window Display ====
The final ten paired up and were asked to create a window display showcasing dresses designed by former Project Runway winners and contestants. Ondine and Natalie won the challenge, and Kerry was eliminated for his work with Wisit.

- Special Guests: Santino Rice (Project Runway Season 2), Jeffrey Sebelia (Project Runway Season 3), Andrae Gonzalo (Project Runway Season 2), Daniel Franco (Project Runway Season 1), and Sweet P (Project Runway Season 4).
- Top Design: Natalie and Ondine
- Eliminated: Kerry

==== Episode 4: Bachelor Pads ====
The nine remaining contestants were divided into teams of three and assigned to design the ultimate bachelor's apartment. Team Green (Nathan, Preston, and Shazia) had trouble deciding on their plans for their room creating a difficult shopping experience for their furniture pieces. The next day during shopping Eddie (Red Team) engaged in a heated argument with a salesman about a broken vase and tried to argue his way out of paying for it. A Pop Design on making flower arrangements was given, with Nathan winning. He received immunity for the challenge. Andrea, Teresa and Wisit won the challenge, and Team Green received the lowest scores, with Shazia getting voted off.

- Special Guest Judge: Jeff Lewis from Flipping Out
- Top Design: Andrea, Teresa and Wisit
- Eliminated: Shazia

==== Episode 5: Triathlon of Decorating ====
The remaining contestants, working solo, were required to design a chair, a table setting, and a pictorial setting for Elle Décor. Nathan won the first two challenges, and Natalie won the third. Teresa was eliminated.

- Top Design: Natalie and Nathan
- Eliminated: Teresa

==== Episode 6: Eco-Offices ====
The remaining contestants re-designed the new offices of the Cadmus Group, an environmental consulting firm that helps government, non-profit, and corporate clients address critical challenges in the environment. Eddie won the challenge, and Wisit was eliminated.

- Special Guest Judge: Danny Seo
- Top Design: Eddie
- Eliminated: Wisit

==== Episode 7: Room of the Future ====
The contestants were asked to design a room of the future, putting their creativity and imagination to the test.

- Top Design: Preston
- Eliminated: Natalie

==== Episode 8: Light It Up ====
Each designer selected an oversized Swarovski chandelier and was asked to create a room around its unique and very particular style. Simon Doonan, Creative Director of Barneys and Jonathan Adler's life partner, served as a guest judge. Ondine was judged to have the poorest design, but Andrea decided to withdraw from the competition because she was homesick.

- Top Design: Preston
- Withdrawn: Andrea
- Preston is the First person to win 2 challenges in a row.

==== Episode 9: Finale, Part 1 ====
Flipping Out's Jeff Lewis returned to judge part one of the Season Two finale. Each designer decorated a room in one of four houses. Both Nathan and Eddie chose the master bedroom, Preston selected the family room adjacent to the kitchen, and Ondine picked the smallest bedroom, in which she created a combination office/guest bedroom. Both Preston and Ondine's designs drew mostly praise from the judges, while Nathan and Eddie were criticized sharply for their choices.

- Finalists: Nathan, Ondine, and Preston
- Eliminated: Eddie

==== Episode 10: Finale, Part 2 ====
The three finalists were required to design the remaining rooms in their respective houses. Each was assigned three carpenters and a seamstress and allotted $80,000 to complete the task. In addition, previously eliminated contestants returned to assist them. Eddie was paired with Preston, Andrea with Ondine, and Natalie with Nathan, who ultimately was named the winner of $100,000 and a spread in Elle Décor.

== Australian version ==
An Australian version of Top Design aired on Nine Network from July 13 until September 7, 2011. It was presented by Jamie Durie, who was also head judge. He was joined in the judging panel by design critic Amanda Talbot and architect Nick Tobias.
