= David Hicks (British designer) =

English interior designer (1929–1998)

- Born: 25 March 1929; Coggeshall, Essex, England
- Died: 29 March 1998 (aged 69); Brightwell Baldwin, Oxfordshire, England
- Occupations: Interior decorator and designer
- Spouse: Lady Pamela Mountbatten (m. 1960)
- Children: Edwina Brudenell; Ashley Hicks; India Flint Wood

David Nightingale Hicks (25 March 1929 – 29 March 1998) was an English interior decorator and designer, noted for using bold colours, mixing antique and modern furnishings, and contemporary art for his famous clientele.

== Early life and education ==
David Nightingale Hicks was born at Coggeshall, Essex, the son of stockbroker Herbert Hicks and Iris Elsie (née Platten). He was educated at Charterhouse and the Central School of Arts and Crafts.

== Career ==
After a brief period of National Service in the British army, Hicks began work drawing cereal boxes for J. Walter Thompson, the advertising agency. His career as designer-decorator was launched to media-acclaim in 1954 when the British magazine House & Garden featured the London house he decorated (at 22 South Eaton Place) for his mother and himself.

An early introduction by Fiona Lonsdale, wife of banker Norman Lonsdale, to Peter Evans initiated a business partnership in London as the pair, now joined by architect Patrick Garnett, set about designing, building and decorating a restaurant chain (Peter Evans Eating Houses) in London's "hotspots", such as Chelsea and Soho.

Evans said of Hicks:

"[He] was without a doubt a genius. He would walk into the most shambolic of spaces that I had decided would be a restaurant, a pub or a nightclub and, lighting up a cigarette, would be out of the place within ten minutes, having decided what atmosphere it would generate because of what it would look like. He always got it spot on."

Hicks and the architectural practice Garnett Cloughley Blakemore (GCB) collaborated on a series of private commissions, including a house on Park Lane for Lord and Lady Londonderry and an apartment for Hicks's brother-in-law, film producer Lord Brabourne. The firm also worked on a new house in London for Hicks's father-in-law, Earl Mountbatten. GCB achieved international recognition when it refurbished the Hotel George V in Paris for the Trust House Forte group. Stanley Kubrick's 1971 film A Clockwork Orange featured GCB's Chelsea Drugstore.

Hicks's early clients mixed aristocracy, media and fashion. He did projects for Vidal Sassoon, Helena Rubinstein, Violet Manners (who became the Duchess of Rutland), Mrs. Condé Nast and Mrs. Douglas Fairbanks, Jr. He made carpets for Windsor Castle and decorated the Prince of Wales's first apartment at Buckingham Palace. Hicks started to design patterned carpets and fabrics when he found none on the market that he considered good enough. These and his hyper-dynamic colour sense formed the basis of a style which was much admired and copied. In 1967, Hicks began working in the USA, designing apartments in Manhattan for an international clientele, and at the same time promoting his carpet and fabric collections. Hicks also designed sets for Richard Lester's 1968 movie Petulia, starring Julie Christie.

In the 1960s, Hicks created a carpet pattern of interlocking hexagons known as Hicks' Hexagon which was prominently featured in Stanley Kubrick's 1980 psychological horror film, The Shining.

In the 1970s/80s Hicks shops opened in fifteen countries around the world. He designed, for example, guestrooms at the Okura Hotel in Tokyo, the public rooms of the British Ambassador's Residence in Tokyo, with only mixed success, and the yacht of the King of Saudi Arabia. Hicks was a talented photographer, painter and sculptor and produced fashion and jewelry collections. He designed the interior of a BMW and scarlet-heeled men's evening shoes.

He wrote, in one of his nine practical design books, David Hicks on Living – With Taste, that his "greatest contribution... has been to show people how to use bold color mixtures, how to use patterned carpets, how to light rooms and how to mix old with new."

Some of Hicks's later work may be seen at Belle Isle, Fermanagh, where the Duke of Abercorn hired him to redecorate the interior of the castle in the 1990s. Hicks decorated the duke's main house, Baronscourt, in the 1970s.

== Personal life ==
Hicks's first notable relationship was with writer and film director Norman Alfred Prouting (1924–1983). Hicks married Lady Pamela Mountbatten (19 April 1929 – 5 June 2026), the younger daughter of the 1st Earl Mountbatten of Burma by his wife, the former Edwina Ashley, on 13 January 1960 at Romsey Abbey in Hampshire. They had three children:

- Edwina Victoria Louise Hicks (born 24 December 1961), who married actor Jeremy Brudenell
- Ashley Louis David Hicks (born 18 July 1963)
- India Amanda Caroline Hicks (born 5 September 1967)

He owned 'The Temple' at Stoke by Nayland, Suffolk in the 1950s.

== Death ==
Hicks spent the last years of his life at 'The Grove', Brightwell Baldwin in Oxfordshire, where he created a garden.

A chain smoker, Hicks died from lung cancer on 29 March 1998, aged 69, at his home. He designed his own coffin, in which he 'lay in state', according to his precise instructions, in the ground-floor room of his gothic garden pavilion. He was buried on 4 April 1998 in Brightwell Baldwin, Oxfordshire, where his grave is marked by an obelisk-shaped tombstone.

== Legacy ==
His elder daughter, Edwina, has created her own fabric book titled Motifs.

His son, Ashley Hicks, is an architect and designer. In 2006 he completed David Hicks: Designer – a celebration of his father's work.

His younger daughter, India, has written two books about design, Island Life and Island Beauty.

Little Greene has Hicks' Blue in their collection. 'A deep inky blue paint by prominent 60s and 70s designer, David Hicks. Hicks was known for using powerful colours in combination to dramatic effect...he used this blue in the restaurant at the top of the London Telecom Tower in 1962'.
