= Sean Murphy (photographer) =

American photographer (born 1968)

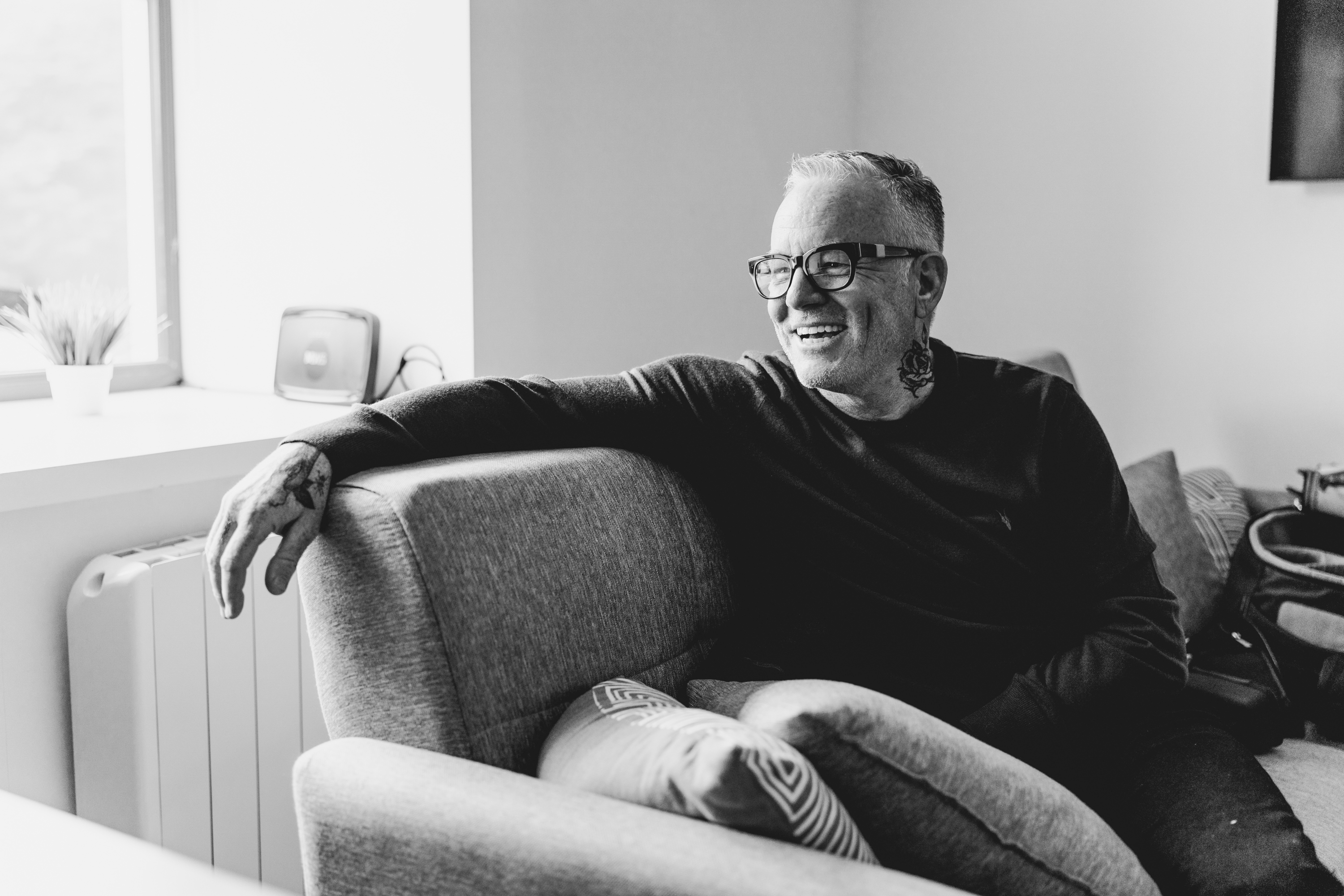
- Education: New England School of Photography
- Occupations: Photographer & cinematographer
- Spouse: Jessica Murphy (m. 2024)
- Website: seanmurphyphoto.com

Sean Murphy (born December 13, 1968) is an American photographer and cinematographer. His work has included photography of musicians and bands such as Weezer, Blink-182, Green Day, Dr. Dre, and Christina Aguilera, as well as album artwork and promotional images.

Murphy has also produced photography for commercial and editorial use, working with companies. His photographs have appeared in publications such as Rolling Stone and Alternative Press. In addition to music and commercial photography, his work has been included in exhibitions and media features.

== Early life ==
Murphy born in Columbus, Ohio on Dec 13, 1968. He is originally from Fort Walton Beach, Florida and grew up in the Florida Panhandle. As a child he lived in Woodbridge, England; Phoenix, Arizona; and Fort Walton Beach, Florida where his father was stationed while active in the United States Air Force. He graduated from Choctawhatchee High School in 1987. In 1993 he graduated valedictorian from New England School of Photography in Boston.

== Career ==
He has taken photographs of many prominent musicians and bands during the mid-1990s through early 2000s, like Weezer, Blink 182, Green Day, Kid Rock, Ryan Adams, The Deftones, Rage Against the Machine, Ice Cube, My Chemical Romance, and Dr. Dre, and Christina Aguilera.

Over the years, he shot more advertising and is known for creating influential lifestyle campaigns. In addition to regular assignments for magazines such as Standup Paddle Magazine, his clients for print and advertising include Adidas, AT&T, Google, Jeep, McDonald's, Microsoft, Nike, Sprint and Toyota. In 2015, Murphy was invited by BOTE Boards and the SweetWater Brewing Company in their efforts to raise funds for the Waterkeeper Alliance.

The Travel Channel featured Sean twice as part of their Secrets of Action Photography episode with Aaron Goodwin and their 10 Ten Locals List while he traveled the Pacific Coast Highway with BOTE Boards. During the summer of 2017, as part of Los Angeles's Grand Park's fifth anniversary, Sean was selected as one of ten Los Angeles photographers for a photographic exhibition where 100 images of Angelenos were projected 150 ft high and 100 ft wide onto the south wall of the mid-century L.A. County Hall of Records. He has worked with publications such as Rolling Stone, Alternative Press, Bikini Magazine, Surface Magazine. Primary visual content creator for BOTE boards outdoor lifestyle brand

In 2025, Murphy published My Friend Weezer, a photography book documenting his work with the band Weezer.

== Personal life ==
Sean has three sons, Ozzy, Tripp and Milo. In 2019, Sean moved back to his hometown of Fort Walton Beach, Florida. In 2024, he married violinist Jessica Heit.

== Album credits ==
Year	Artist	Album
1999	Buck-O-Nine	Libido
2000	A Perfect Circle	Mer de Noms
2000	Christina Aguilera	My Kind of Christmas
2001	Tenacious D	Tenacious D
2001	Scapegoat Wax	Okeeblow
2001	G. Love & Special Sauce	Electric Mile
2002	Weezer	Maladroit
	AM Radio (band)	Radioactive
2005	Weezer	Make Believe
2008	Weezer	The Red Album
2009	Weezer	Raditude
2016	Weezer	The White Album
2019	Weezer	The Teal Album
2019	Weezer	Van Weezer

== Awards ==
- Photo District News – Photo Annual contest – Advertising 2013
- Photo District News – Photo Annual contest – Advertising 2014
- International Photography Awards – Honorable Mention 2014
