= Little Green Island (disambiguation) =

Little Green Island is an island in southeastern Australia.

Little Green Island may also refer to:

- Little Green Island (Alaska)
- Little Green Island, Hong Kong, adjacent to Green Island, Hong Kong
- Little Green Island, private island located off of Shoal Point, Queensland
- Little Green Islands, in Fortune Bay, Newfoundland, Canada, near Green Island

== See also ==
- Green Island (disambiguation)
- Big Green Island
