= Prince Abdulaziz (yacht) =

Saudi motor yacht built in 1984

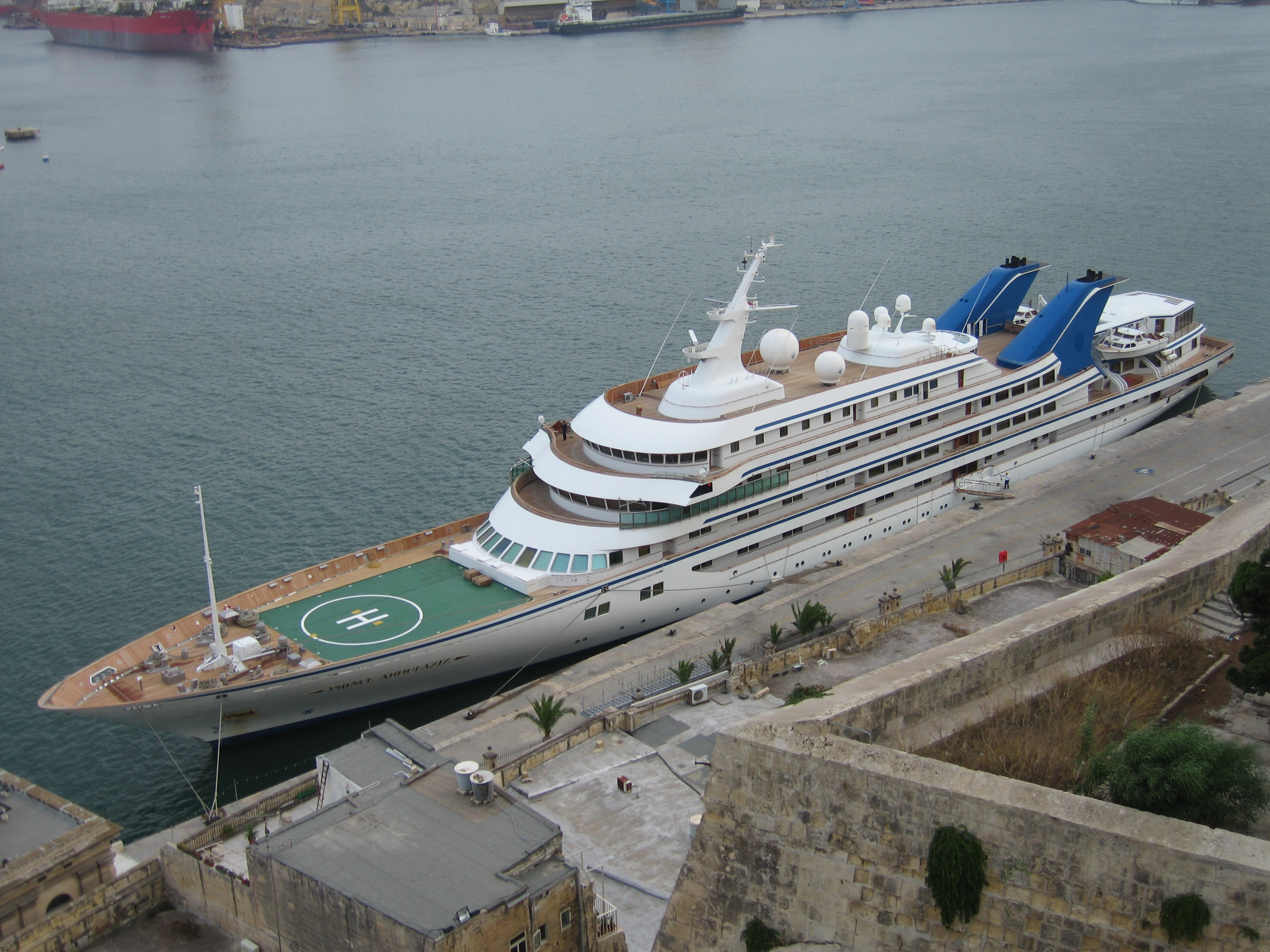
Prince Abdulaziz in Malta in Sep 2006.

Prince Abdulaziz is one of the royal yachts of the Saudi royal family and is among the largest motor yachts in the world.

== History ==
With a length of 147 metres (482 ft 3 in) at delivery, the yacht was the longest and tallest in the world. It retained this status for 22 years until it was overtaken by Dubai in 2006. Designed by Maierform and built in 1984 by Helsingør Værft in Helsingør, Denmark, the first owner was the late King Fahd of Saudi Arabia. The yacht is owned by the Saudi royal family.

The 147-metre-long ship has a beam of 18.3 m and a draught of 4.9 m. It is propelled by two 5,816 kW Pielstick diesel generator sets. Cruising speed is set at 18 knots (33 km/h; 21 mph), but it can be raised to 22 knots (41 km/h; 25 mph). At full capacity, the yacht requires a 60–65 man crew. It can also hold up to 64 guests onboard. The interior designer was David Nightingale Hicks.
