= Ashley Hicks =

British interior designer, author, photographer and artist

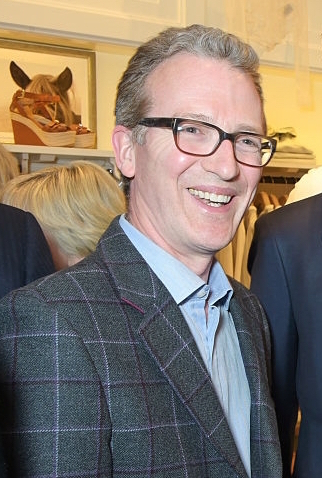
- Hicks in 2015
- Born: Ashley Louis David Hicks; 18 July 1963 (age 63); London, England
- Education: Architectural Association School of Architecture
- Occupations: interior, fabric and furniture designer, artist, photographer and author
- Spouses: Allegra Tondato (m. 1990; div. 2009) Kata de Solis (m. 2015; div. 2018)
- Children: 4, including Angelica
- Parent(s): David Hicks; Lady Pamela Mountbatten
- Relatives: Mountbatten family
- Website: AshleyHicks.com

Ashley Louis David Hicks (born 18 July 1963) is a British interior designer, author, photographer and artist. He is the only son of Lady Pamela Hicks (née Mountbatten) and David Hicks. Hicks has designed interiors in Europe, the United States, and the United Kingdom. He also has a fabric line for Lee Jofa and furniture lines.

Hicks is the grandson of Louis Mountbatten, 1st Earl Mountbatten of Burma. He was also the godson of his first cousin once-removed, Prince Philip, Duke of Edinburgh. Through his mother, he is in the line of succession to the earldom of Mountbatten of Burma, a title created with a special remainder that allows for inheritance through the female line (meaning through the two daughters of the 1st Earl).

== Early life and family ==
Ashley Louis David Hicks was born on 18 July 1963, at King's College Hospital in Denmark Hill, London. He is the son and second child of David and Lady Pamela Hicks, and the younger brother of Edwina Brudenell and the older brother of India Hicks.

Hicks was raised at Britwell House, an 18th-century house in Britwell Salome in Oxfordshire, that served as the family's home, as well as his father's showplace. It was there that his father designed elaborate landscapes that were "virtual outdoor rooms with carefully framed vistas". Hicks was a boarding student at Stowe School. In 1978, the family decided to sell the house, and Hicks attended the three-day Sotheby's sale, 20–22 March 1979. After the auction, the Hicks family moved to The Grove, a nearby estate, and also resided at Albany, an historic and exclusive apartment house in Piccadilly.

Through his mother, Hicks is a grandson of the first Earl and Countess Mountbatten of Burma. Through his maternal grandfather, Lord Louis Mountbatten, Hicks is a second cousin of King Charles III. He is also the godson of Prince Philip, Duke of Edinburgh. Lady Edwina Mountbatten was one of Britain's richest women, having inherited most of the £7.5 million fortune of her grandfather, Sir Ernest Cassel.

=== Family tragedy ===
As a child, Hicks spent family holidays at Sligo Castle in Ireland and the Mountbatten family ancestral home at Broadlands in Hampshire, where the royal family were frequent guests. In August 1979, when Hicks was 16 years old, his grandfather and his cousin Nicholas Knatchbull were assassinated by the Provisional Irish Republican Army when his grandfather's wooden boat, the Shadow V, was blown up by a remote-controlled bomb on Donegal Bay. "I didn't go on the boat because I went to buy some cigarettes. It was a beautiful summer's day and I was with India, watching television. We had the windows open and then we heard this big bang."

== Career ==
Hicks says his first decorating experience took place when he was 15 or 16 years old, when he decorated his room in a checkered black-and-white motif. Everything in his room had to be either black or white, including the ceiling and carpet.

Influenced by his father, Hicks studied painting and fine art, graduating from the Bath School of Art and Design and trained with the Architectural Association School of Architecture, in London. He then worked briefly for his father's interior design house, before establishing his own architectural firm, designing interiors and furniture.

In 1997, Hicks began designing furniture at the Gem Palace in Jaipur, India. His first piece was his interpretation of a Greek Klismos chair, based on a 1920s drawing by an architect. The chair is rendered in Burmese teak, with a seat made of interwoven straps of saddle leather. He describes the chair as "far more like the ancient Greek ones in its construction, than the Neoclassical revivals". When Hicks initially designed in India, he designed under the moniker of "Jantar Mantar". Hicks explains, "It means abracadabra, also hocus pocus, and is local slang for the Jaipur Observatory."

In addition to interior and furniture design, Hicks produces various lines of fabric, wallpaper, and carpeting—some under the "David Hicks by Ashley Hicks" brand and others under his own name. Licences to his fabric and wallpaper collections are held by GP & J Baker; the licences to his carpeting lines are held by Stark and Alternative Flooring. In 2002, along with his ex-wife Allegra, he wrote Design Alchemy, which provided an overview of the interiors and products they designed. Hicks also produced a series of Allegra Hicks shops as well as a collection of home accessories that were sold in these shops. In 2017, Hicks published his first book on his own work, Details, which also serves as a source book for his inspiration; published by IDEA Publishing, it sold out within a month.

Hicks began photographing historic interiors for Cabana Magazine in 2016, ranging from a derelict glass factory in Murano, Venice, to grand English country houses like Houghton and Althorp. In 2017 he photographed and wrote a history of Buckingham Palace: The Interiors, published by Rizzoli in conjunction with the Royal Collection. In 2019 he published Rooms with a History, a survey of his own design works and historic interiors that inspired them, all photographed by him.

Hicks is currently a contributing editor for Cabana Magazine.

Hicks exhibited furniture and sculptural objects made by his own hands at New York's R and Company gallery in 2019.

Hicks has also regularly worked with various brands on product collaborations, including a bed linen collection with Frette, a candle range collaboration with Jo Malone and swimsuit collaborations with Orlebar Brown and Coverswim, as well as furniture projects with Kartell and Promemoria.

== Personal life ==
On 18 October 1990, Hicks married in Wheatley, Oxfordshire, Italian designer Marina Allegra Federica Silvia Tondato, better known as Allegra Tondato (born 20 May 1960, Turin, Italy), a daughter of physicist and musician Dr. Carlo Tondato and his wife, Turinese lawyer Rosy Tondato (née Maza), whose legacy includes having a hybrid orchid named in her honor in 1982 (Guaricyclia Rosy Tondato) and the European Classical Music Competition “Città di Moncalieri” establishing the Rosy Tondato Award in her name. Hicks and Tondato met in 1988, at the Café de Paris in London, when he was a student at the Architectural Association and she was studying art history at Sotheby's. He proposed to her over "Twiglets and apple juice at the Groucho Club" in Soho, London.

After their wedding, Hicks and his wife lived in a renovated building in New York City that belonged to Marc Chagall's grandson. It was near Fifth Avenue, surrounded by the lofts and studios of local artists. While the building was renovated, the interior of their home was rather low scale, lacking air conditioning. Allegra said of their home, "Although it was a glamorous address it was, for us, more about the people who lived there." They lived in New York from 1991 to 1992.

From this first marriage, Hicks has two daughters:

- Angelica Margherita Edwina Hicks (born 16 September 1992), a fashion illustrator
- Ambrosia Maria Elizabeth Hicks (born 23 January 1997)

In May 2009, the couple announced the end of their marriage. Allegra remarried in June 2014 Marchese Roberto Mottola di Amato, a Neapolitan landowner and entrepreneur.

On 5 September 2015, Hicks married American digital fashion editor Kathryn 'Katalina' Anne Sharkey, better known as Kata de Solis (born 31 December 1981, Houston, Texas), daughter of William T. Sharkey, CPA, and his wife Rosalie Sharkey (née Solis). Kata de Solis is the former director of digital marketing for Chanel. Hicks and de Solis separated in August 2018 and then divorced at the end of 2018.

From his second marriage, Hicks has two sons:

- Caspian Hicks (born 21 January 2018)
- Horatio Hicks (born 12 February 2019)

Hicks decorated his partner Martina Mondadori's home in Milan, Italy, in 2020. Martina Mondadori Sartogo is the founder and editor-in-chief of Cabana magazine, known as one of the world's most luxurious interiors magazine.

== Published works ==
- Hicks, Ashley. Rooms with a History, Rizzoli, 2017. ISBN 978-0847865703
- Hicks, Ashley. Buckingham Palace: The Interiors, Rizzoli, 2018. ISBN 0847863190
- Hicks, Ashley. David Hicks Scrapbooks, Vendome Press, 2017. ISBN 978-0865653450
- Hicks, Ashley. Details, IDEA Ltd., 2017.
- Hicks, Ashley. David Hicks Scrapbooks, IDEA Ltd., 2016.
- Hicks, Ashley. David Hicks: A Life of Design, Rizzoli, 2009. ISBN 978-0-8478-3330-6
- Hicks, Ashley. David Hicks: Designer, Scriptum Editions, December 2002. ISBN 978-1-902686-19-6
- Hicks, Ashley; Hicks, Allegra; and Irons, Jeremy (foreword). Design Alchemy, Conran Octopus, May 2002. ISBN 978-1-84091-193-0

Lines of succession
Preceded by Louis Ellingworth	Succession to the British throne descended from Alice, daughter of Victoria	Succeeded by Angelica Hicks
