= Nubar Alexanian =

American photographer

- Born: 1950 (age 75–76); Worcester
- Education: Boston University
- Occupation: Documentary Photographer

Nubar Alexanian (born 1950) is an American documentary photographer who focuses on the human condition. He has published several books of photographs, showing Peru, musicians, and the film sets of Errol Morris among others.

Alexanian's company Walker Creek Media was created in 2006 and produces short documentary films for non-profit organizations.

== Early life and education ==
Nubar Alexanian was born in 1950 in Worcester, Massachusetts. He was the second of four children and was prized as the first son in an orthodox Armenian family. He was the grandson of survivors of the Armenian genocide, and grew up speaking Armenian with his grandfather who lived in the apartment upstairs, only learning English upon entering elementary school.

Alexanian attended Boston University for two years, then took time off to attend and teach at the New England School of Photography. He then left photography school and later became a member of the first class in the University Without Walls program at the University of Massachusetts, where he got credit for teaching at the New England School of Photography from 1973 to 1974. He graduated in 1974 with a BA in Liberal Arts.

== Teaching ==
After his time as an instructor at the Art Institute of Boston (1972–1974) and at the New England School of Photography (1973–1975), in 1975 Alexanian co-founded the Essex Photographic Workshop, one of the first residential photographic programs in the U.S., in Essex, Massachusetts. He since has conducted workshops and given lectures all over the world, including at the International Center of Photography in New York City and the Gaudí School of Photography in Peru. More recently, he has facilitated critique groups in the Boston area for photographers who are working on long-term personal projects.

== Books ==
Alexanian's first trip out of the country was to Peru in 1974. From 1978 to 1989 he traveled extensively to Peru documenting the life and culture of the [Andean] people. He received a Fulbright Artist Fellowship in 1983 to continue his work in Peru, allowing him to live and work there for six months. The culmination of this work, Stones in the Road: Photographs of Peru (Aperture), documents the migration of the Andean culture from the mountains to the shanty towns in and around Lima, one of the many tragedies caused by civil war and a growing illegal drug industry.

In 1996 Alexanian published his first major color project, the book Where Music Comes From (Dewi Lewis). Five years in the making, this documents the creative processes of 25 musicians including Wynton Marsalis, Philip Glass, Emmylou Harris, and Paul Simon, among others.

After traveling extensively for Stones in the Road and Where Music Comes from, Alexanian turned toward his own town, Gloucester, Massachusetts, for his book Gloucester Photographs (Walker Creek Press).

In 2002, in collaboration with Wynton Marsalis, Alexanian published Jazz (Walker Creek Press), a collection of images and quotations that illustrate the musical conversation between Marsalis and his audience.

In 2005, Alexanian shot fifty portraits for a book, This I Believe, related to a radio series with the same title.

Alexanian's fifth book, Nonfiction: Photographs by Nubar Alexanian from the Film Sets of Errol Morris, released by Walker Creek Press in the spring of 2008, is a long-term collaboration with Errol Morris, comprising stills from the sets of Fast, Cheap and Out of Control, Mr. Death, and Standard Operating Procedure, among others.

== Films ==
- The Clifford Ball (1994): Co-director of a documentary film about the band Phish that aired on MTV. 30 minutes.
- Flamenco Shorts (2004): Director and director of photography, shot in HD on sound stage in Halifax, Nova Scotia, four short films of flamenco performances.
- Flamenco Nuevo (2007): Director and director of photography, four camera HD, shot in Spain about a flamenco troupe. 90 minutes.
- Musically Speaking II (2010): A documentary about the language of music produced for Bose Corporation to inspire middle school students to find their own voice in the world of music.
- Ballet Slippers at 1000fps (2010): Shot at 1000fps, the dancer made one move that was only a few seconds long which plays out to just over a minute.
- Wind Power: In the first four years of President Barack Obama’s administration, electricity generated from wind and solar power more than doubled. In 2012 alone, 13 Gigawatts of wind energy came online in the U.S.–the equivalent output of 6 Hoover Dams.
- Project SAVE 40th Anniversary Video (2015): Project SAVE Armenian Photograph Archives celebration of 40 years of collecting, preserving and promoting our Armenian heritage through the photograph.
- Calling All Chefs (2014): Based in Beverly, Massachusetts this short explores the story of a bar & grill owner who posted an ad on Craigslist for a new cook and never expected a two-star Michelin chef from Italy.
- Science All Around Us (2014): An educational series that inspires kids and adults to learn science by venturing out into the world and experiencing all of what the world has to offer.
- Recipe For Disaster (2017): A documentary short exploring an ecological catastrophe in the making in four neighboring towns on the Massachusetts coast. As native scallops, mussels, clams, and protective eelgrass disappear under the explosive invasion of green crabs, scientists, local experts, and residents are scrambling to save the marsh from decimation.
- Finding Armenia (In Production): A feature length, intimate portrayal of Nubar Alexanian’s search for the essence of his Armenian identity that had always lived in the shadows.

== Radio ==
Perfect Hearing, a radio documentary about tinnitus and hearing loss, produced by Nubar Alexanian and Abby Alexanian, with Jay Allison. Aired in February 2004 on This American Life.

== Collections ==
- Center for Creative Photography, University of Arizona, Tucson, AZ
- Bibliothèque nationale de France, Paris
- Cape Ann Museum, Gloucester, MA
