= New England School of Photography =

Former for-profit art school in Boston, Massachusetts

Coordinates: 42°20′56.8″N 71°5′48.3″W

The New England School of Photography was a private for-profit arts school founded in 1968 and located in Boston, Massachusetts. After more than 50 years of operation, it permanently closed in March 2020. Alumni records have been transferred to the Massachusetts Division of Professional Licensure (DPL), Office of Private Occupational School Education, a part of the state government.

== Description ==
NESOP most recently had approximately 150 full-time students in its two-year Professional Photography Program. The Professional Photography Program offered two start dates each year, in October and February. NESOP was accredited by the Accrediting Commission of Career Schools and Colleges (ACCSC). The school also ran (evening) workshops seasonally throughout the year, which began in January, March, June and September. The workshops were offered in a variety of disciplines for all skill levels.

== History ==
NESOP was founded in 1968 by Academy-Award nominated cinematographer John H. Carruthers to fill the need for professional photographic training in the Boston area. The school was originally located at 739 Boylston Street, Boston, Massachusetts. The first students began class in September 1969 and graduated in May 1971. In August 1972, NESOP was moved to 537 Commonwealth Avenue, Kenmore Square, Boston, Massachusetts and grew to occupy approximately 14,000 square feet (1,300 m^{2}), including space at 650 Beacon Street, Kenmore Square, Boston, Massachusetts.

NESOP started with a general photographic curriculum in 1968, and eventually expanded to offer eight Majors in commercial and artistic areas as well as ten Minor areas of study. In August 1991, William R. Carruthers became President of NESOP, and in December 2006 he assumed ownership due to the death of his father and founder of the school, John H. Carruthers.

In 2017, NESOP was forced to move from Kenmore Square when the building it occupied was closed for demolition by its owner, Boston University. The school relocated to 274 Moody Street in downtown Waltham, Massachusetts. After two years of operation at that location, NESOP closed permanently around March 2020.

== Notable alumni ==
- Danny Clinch, photographer
- Adrian Mueller, photographer
- Kuni Takahashi, photojournalist
- Nubar Alexanian, photographer
- James Daly, journalist
- India Hicks, model, designer, author
- Sean Murphy, photographer
- Tony Northrup, author, photographer, and video instructor
