= India Hicks =

British designer, writer and businesswoman

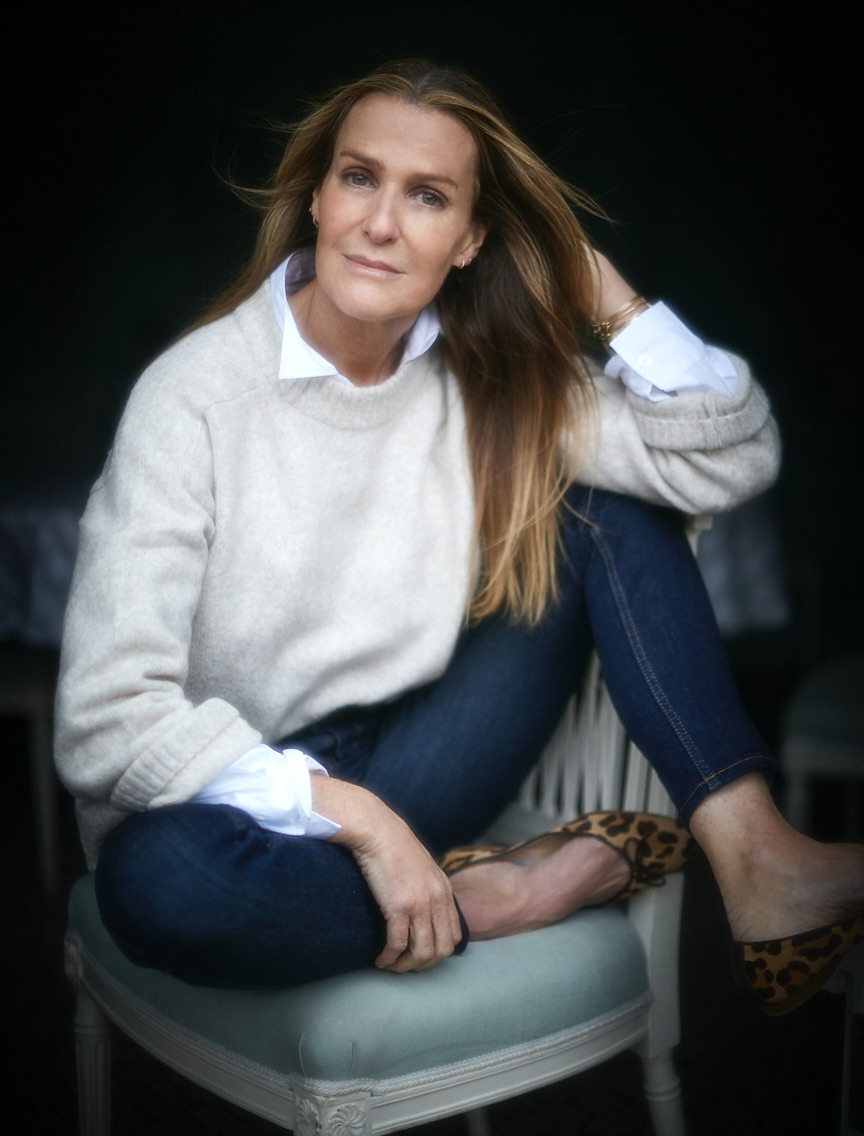
- Hicks in 2020
- Born: India Amanda Caroline Hicks; 5 September 1967 (age 59); Lambeth, London, England
- Education: Gordonstoun School; New England School of Photography
- Occupations: Designer; writer; businesswoman; former model
- Television: Bravo's Top Design show (season 2)
- Spouse: David Flint Wood (m. 2021)
- Children: 5
- Parent(s): David Nightingale Hicks; Lady Pamela Mountbatten
- Relatives: Mountbatten family
- Website: indiahicks.com

India Amanda Caroline Hicks (born 5 September 1967) is a British designer, writer, businesswoman and former fashion model. After graduating from the New England School of Photography, Hicks became an interior designer and a model for Ralph Lauren, among others. She moved to the Bahamas in 1996, where she published books, promoted home and beauty products, and introduced a line of jewellery. Hicks travels frequently to disaster sites in her role with the non-profit organisation Global Empowerment Mission. A daughter of Lady Pamela Hicks, she is a maternal descendant of the House of Mountbatten and a relative of the British royal family.

== Early life ==
India Amanda Caroline Hicks was born on 5 September 1967 in Lambeth, London, the third child of Lady Pamela Mountbatten and David Nightingale Hicks. Her mother was a lady-in-waiting to Queen Elizabeth II and her father was a famous interior designer. She is the granddaughter of the 1st Earl and Countess Mountbatten of Burma and the second cousin and goddaughter of Charles III.

Hicks grew up in Oxfordshire, England. She spent holidays at the family estate in Ireland and at her father's self-designed and built Bahamian-holiday home. As a child, she was a tomboy who kept her distance from royal affairs. Hicks was exposed to design at an early age through her father and brother, who were both architects. The 11-year-old Hicks was on holiday in Ireland in 1979 when her grandfather was killed by a bomb planted on his boat. In 1981, she served as bridesmaid to Lady Diana Spencer at her wedding to Prince Charles.

Hicks went to boarding school in Scotland at Gordonstoun, from which she was expelled for having boys in her room. She then backpacked across India. Hicks moved to Boston, Massachusetts at age 18 to study photography at the New England School of Photography, where she graduated in 1990.

== Career ==
After graduating college, Hicks' father introduced her to Emilio Pucci in Florence, Italy, where she modelled swimsuits. Later, she modelled for Ralph Lauren in New York City, Tod's, J.Crew, and others. She lived in Paris for three years, before moving to New York City for three years. Hicks moved to the Bahamas in 1996.

In the Bahamas, Hicks restored homes, invested and remodelled a hotel, and published several books on design and lifestyle. Her first book called Island Life was a design book with photographs of Hibiscus Hill, a house she designed. This was followed by a second book, Island Beauty, and a third book on photography and design, Island Style. Hicks also started a boutique shop in the Bahamas called the Sugar Mill Trading Company with business partner Linda Griffin. The shop sells jewellery, clothes, household goods, and other items.

From 2005 to 2014, Hicks worked with Crabtree & Evelyn as a spokeswoman and creative consultant for home and skincare products. The company created the India Hicks Island Living and India Hicks Island Night lines of soaps, candles, and perfumes.

In 2008, Hicks co-hosted the second season of the Bravo interior design show Top Design in Los Angeles, California. She introduced her own line of jewellery in 2011. Hicks also became a public commentator on events surrounding the royal family and the 2011 wedding of Prince William and Catherine Middleton. In 2015, Hicks created an e-commerce venture called India Hicks Inc. with partners Nicholas Keuper and HauteLook. It sells jewellery, handbags, perfumes, beauty products, and other goods. The business grew to more than $10 million in annual revenues.

Hicks also worked with the Home Shopping Network on a line of bedding products called India Hicks Island Living.

== Personal life ==
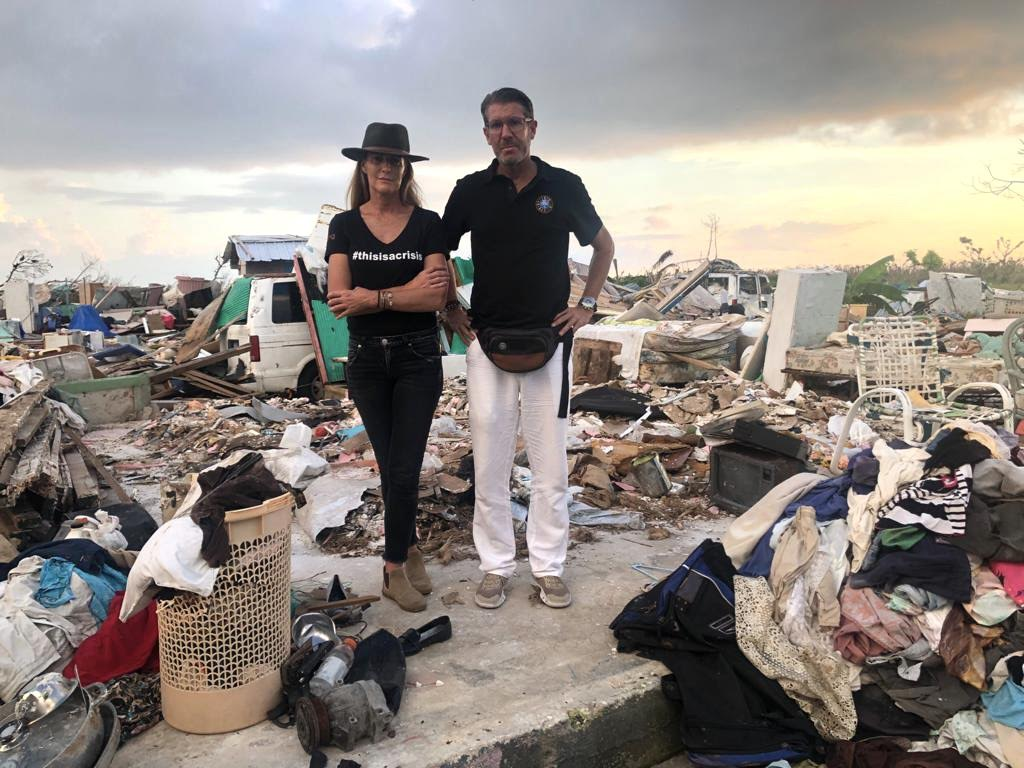
Hicks visiting the aftermath of Hurricane Dorian, as part of the Global Empowerment Mission, 2019

Hicks met her husband David Flint Wood as a child. He was previously in a relationship with her cousin, Lady Helen Windsor and then Susannah Constantine, a fashion journalist and the former girlfriend of her other cousin, David Armstrong-Jones, 2nd Earl of Snowdon. India and David re-connected as adults during a holiday in the Bahamas. She was pregnant with their first child four months after moving to the Bahamas in 1996. They have five children, four biologial and one adopted. In late 2020, she announced plans to marry Flint Wood. Hicks married Flint Wood on 10 September 2021 at St Bartholomew's parish church in Brightwell Baldwin, Oxfordshire. Guests at the wedding included Brooke Shields, Kirstie Allsopp, and Sophie Dahl.

The couple have a house, "America Farm" in Ewelme, Oxfordshire, built on land that Hicks had inherited and replacing two redundant farm workers' cottages. Hicks' book about the project, India Hicks: The Story of Four Houses – A Slice of England, was published by Rizzoli International Publications in 2018.

Hicks has competed in several marathons. She also rode a 100-mile (160 km) bike ride to raise money for cancer victims, in memory of her adopted son's biological mother. She partners with a local food bank and with the disaster relief agency Global Empowerment Mission (GEM). She joined the Global Empowerment Mission's board in 2019. On behalf of GEM, she visited the Abaco Islands after Hurricane Dorian, Alabama after it experienced a tornado, Florida after the surfside condominium collapse, and Poland during Russia's invasion of Ukraine. She is also an ambassador for The Prince's Trust, a charity that helps young people find training, and work opportunities.

In 2020, Hicks pleaded guilty at Uxbridge Magistrates' Court to shoplifting a coat and was ordered to pay costs and a victim surcharge. Her spokesperson stated: "The court accepted that at the time of taking the coat, India had simply been absent-minded and hadn't intended to leave without paying for it".

== Books ==
- 2004: Hicks, India; Flint Wood, David; Loftus, David (8 October 2003). Island Life: Inspirational Interiors. Pavillion Books. ISBN 978-1862-0548-99.
- 2006: Island Beauty
- 2015: India Hicks: Island Style
- 2018: India Hicks: A Slice of England
- 2020: An Entertaining Story
- 2024: Lady Pamela

Lines of succession
Preceded by Jordan Brudenell	Succession to the British throne	Succeeded by The Margrave of Baden
