= Lady Pamela Hicks =

British aristocrat (1929–2026)

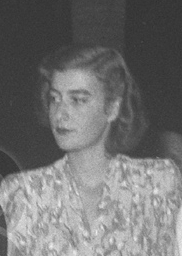
- Hicks in 1947
- Born: Pamela Carmen Louise Mountbatten; 19 April 1929; Ritz Hotel, Barcelona, Spain
- Died: 5 June 2026 (aged 97); Brightwell Baldwin, Oxfordshire, England
- Spouse: David Hicks (m. 1960; died 1998)
- Children: Edwina Brudenell; Ashley Hicks; India Hicks
- Parents: Louis Mountbatten, 1st Earl Mountbatten of Burma (father); Edwina Ashley (mother)
- Family: Mountbatten family

Lady Pamela Carmen Louise Hicks (née Mountbatten; 19 April 1929 – 5 June 2026) was a British aristocrat and relative of the British royal family. She was the younger daughter of Admiral of the Fleet the 1st Earl Mountbatten of Burma (formerly Prince Louis of Battenberg) and the heiress Edwina Ashley. Hicks was first cousin of Prince Philip, Duke of Edinburgh, and niece of Queen Louise of Sweden. She served as a bridesmaid and later as a lady-in-waiting to Elizabeth II, her third cousin. She was also a great-great-granddaughter of Queen Victoria through her father.

== Early life and family ==
Pamela Carmen Louise Mountbatten was born five weeks prematurely on 19 April 1929 at the Ritz Hotel in Barcelona, Spain, to Edwina Ashley and the then Lord Louis Mountbatten (later 1st Earl Mountbatten of Burma). She had one sibling, an elder sister, Patricia, 2nd Countess Mountbatten of Burma. She was baptised on 12 July in the Chapel Royal, St James's Palace. Her godparents were: King Alfonso XIII of Spain; Prince George; the Marchioness of Milford Haven; the Countess of Brecknock (Lady Louis's first cousin); and the Duchess of Peñaranda (María del Carmen de Saavedra y Collado, Marchioness of Villaviciosa).

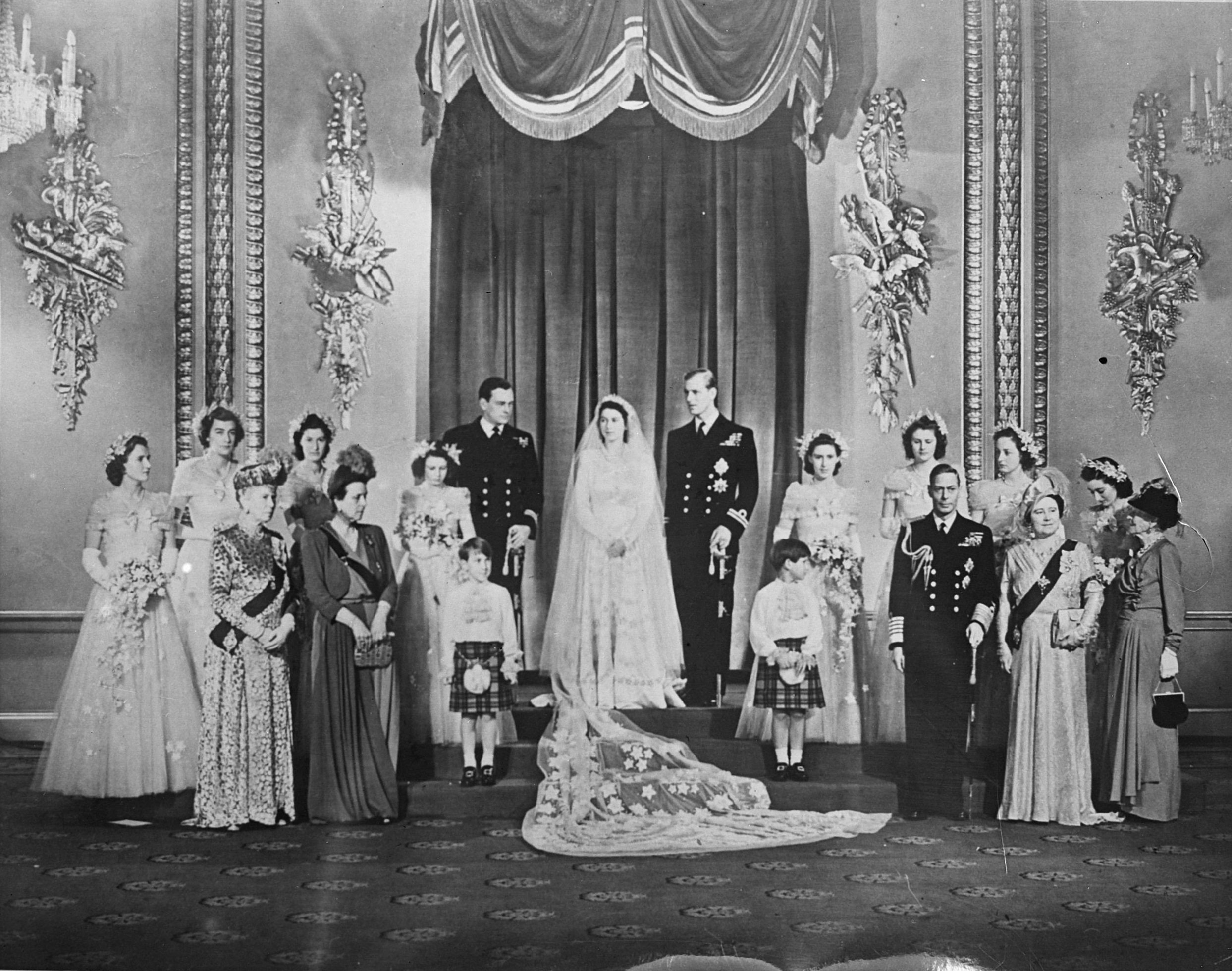
Hicks, first row, second from left, at the wedding of Princess Elizabeth and Prince Philip in 1947.

A member of the Mountbatten family by birth, she descended from the Battenberg family,a morganatic cadet branch of the House of Hesse-Darmstadt. At the request of George V, her grandparents, Prince Louis of Battenberg and Princess Victoria of Hesse and by Rhine, relinquished their German princely titles in 1917 in exchange for British peerage titles due to anti-German sentiment in Britain. Her father, who was born a prince of Battenberg, was later created Earl Mountbatten of Burma. She was a great-great-granddaughter of Queen Victoria and Prince Albert of Saxe-Coburg and Gotha, and, until her death in 2026, their oldest surviving descendant. She was also a first cousin of Prince Philip, Duke of Edinburgh. Her mother was the daughter of the 1st Baron Mount Temple and the granddaughter of Sir Ernest Cassel.

She attended Hewitt School in New York City.

In 1947, Mountbatten accompanied her parents to British India, remaining with them throughout her father's term as the last Viceroy of India and then as Governor-General of post-Partition India through 1948. She lived with them in the Viceroy's House in New Delhi and at the summer Viceregal Lodge in Simla. After partition, she served as co-secretary to her father, according to Freedom at Midnight, for which she gave interviews. Following Indian independence in August 1947, she became secretary to her parents' friend and associate, V. K. Krishna Menon, then acting High Commissioner of India to the United Kingdom.

== Official duties ==
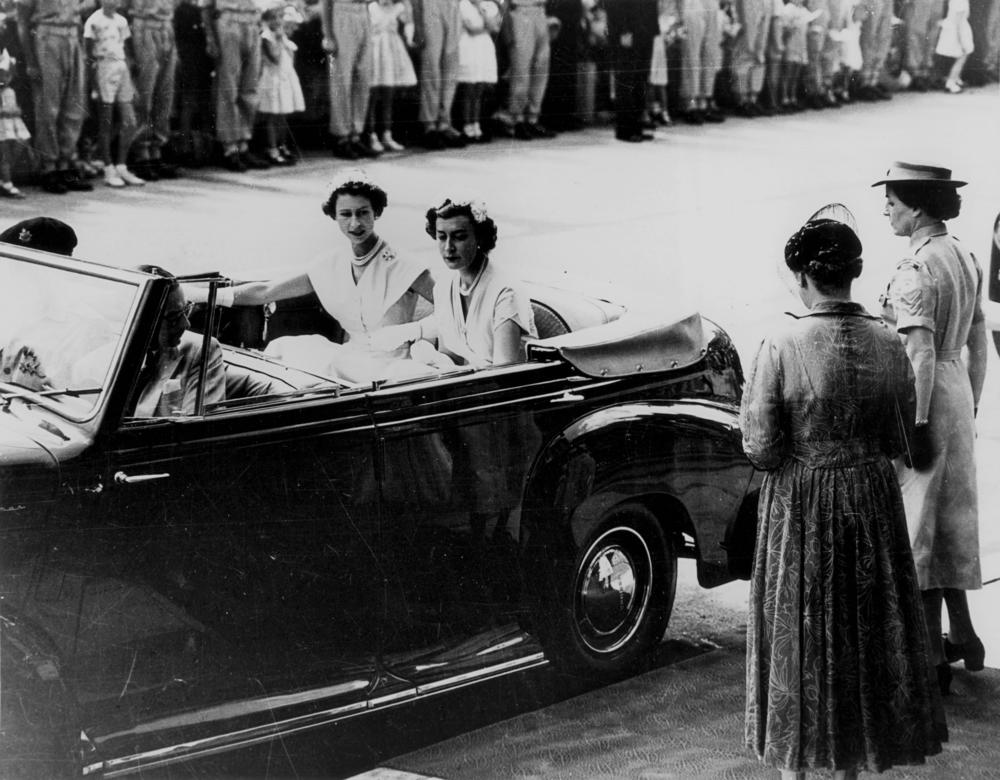
Elizabeth II and Hicks arrive at a Women's Reception at Brisbane City Hall, 1954

In November 1947, Mountbatten was a bridesmaid to then-Princess Elizabeth at her wedding to Prince Philip. As lady-in-waiting to Elizabeth, she was with her and Philip in Kenya when George VI died on 6 February 1952. In late 1953 and early 1954, she accompanied the Queen as lady-in-waiting on the royal tour to Jamaica, Panama, Fiji, Tonga, New Zealand, Australia, Ceylon, Aden, Libya, Malta and Gibraltar.

Mountbatten was the Corps Commandant of the Girls' Nautical Training Corps from around 1952 to around 1959.

== Marriage and children ==
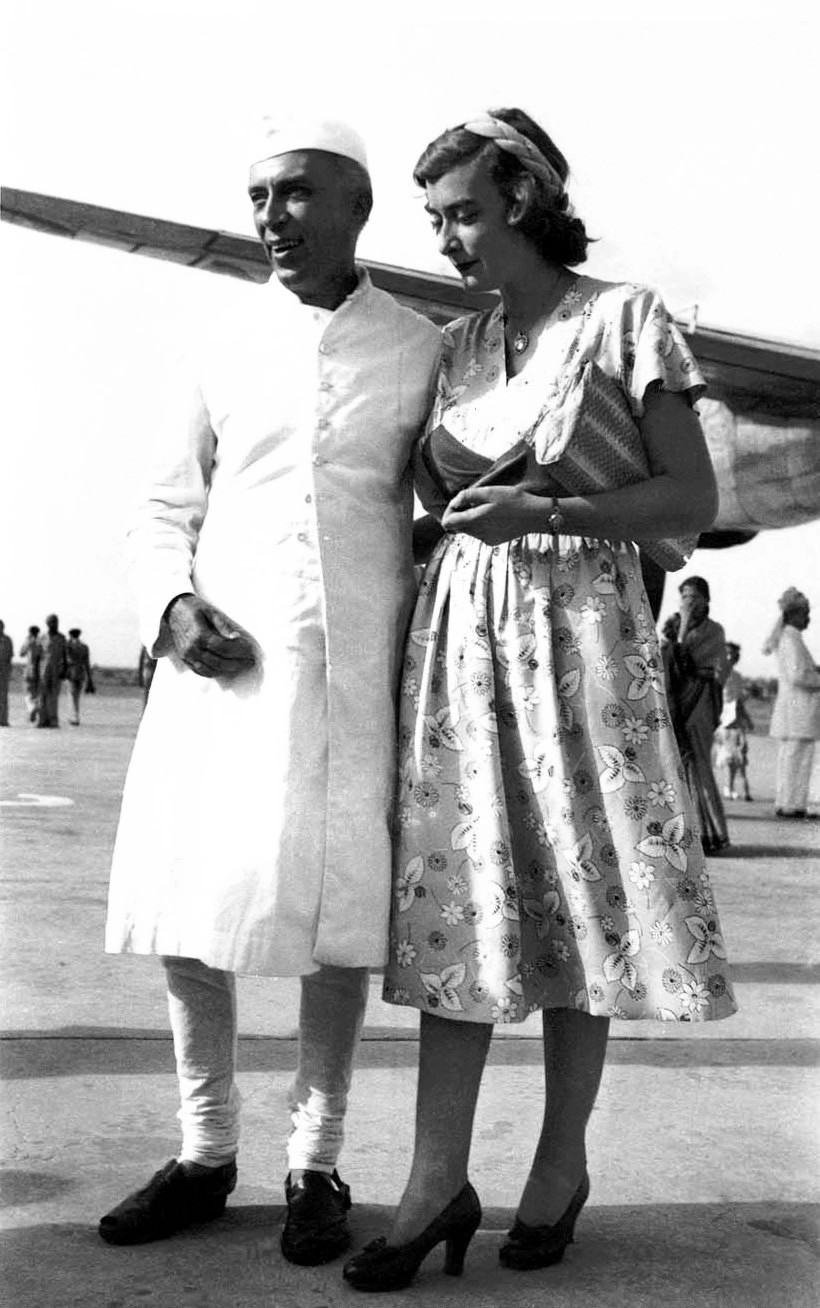
Hicks with Prime Minister Jawaharlal Nehru in India (June 1948)

On 13 January 1960, Mountbatten married the interior decorator and designer David Hicks (1929–1998), son of stockbroker Herbert Hicks and Iris Elsie Platten, at Romsey Abbey in Hampshire. The bridesmaids were Princess Anne; Princess Clarissa of Hesse (daughter of her cousin Sophie); Victoria Marten (goddaughter of the bride); the Hon. Joanna Knatchbull; and the Hon. Amanda Knatchbull (daughters of the bride's sister Patricia). Upon returning from honeymoon in the West Indies and New York, Hicks learnt of the death of her mother in Jesselton in February 1960.

The couple had three children:

- Edwina Victoria Louise Hicks (born 24 December 1961), who married actor Jeremy Brudenell in 1984. They divorced in 2004.
- Ashley Louis David Hicks (born 18 July 1963), who has married Marina Allegra Federica Silvia Tondato, known as Allegra Tondato, in 1990 and Kathryn 'Katalina' Anne Sharkey, known as Kata de Solis, in 2015.
- India Amanda Caroline Hicks (born 5 September 1967), who married David Flint Wood in 2021.

== Later life and death ==
Hicks was a director of H Securities Unlimited, a fund management and brokerage firm, from 1991. She was also a former director of Cottesmore Farms. In 2002, she sold her mother's pierced, millegraine-set tiara at Sotheby's.

In 2007, she published her memoirs of her time in New Delhi and Simla, when India was partitioned into India and Pakistan and the Union Jack was lowered. Hicks wrote in India Remembered: A Personal Account of the Mountbattens During the Transfer of Power that, while her mother, Countess Mountbatten of Burma, and Jawaharlal Nehru, the future Prime Minister of India, were deeply in love, "the relationship remained platonic". In 2012, she published a second volume of memoirs, Daughter of Empire: Life as a Mountbatten, chronicling her childhood, her time in India, and her time as lady-in-waiting to the Queen.

In 2018, at the age of 89, Hicks was hospitalised with pneumonia and remained on a trolley in a hospital corridor for 20 hours before receiving treatment. She later said that "the NHS were brilliant".

After the death of her cousin, Prince Philip, in 2021, she was the last surviving great-grandchild of Princess Alice of the United Kingdom, and following the death of Elizabeth II in September 2022, she became the oldest living descendant of Queen Victoria. With her daughter, India, Hicks attended the Queen's state funeral on 19 September 2022.

Hicks died after a fall at her home in Brightwell Baldwin, Oxfordshire, on 5 June 2026, aged 97. Following her death, a spokesperson for Charles III stated that the King was "greatly saddened" by the news. Her funeral was held at St Bartholomew's Church in Brightwell Baldwin on 13 June. Hicks's cause of death was later recorded as a hip fracture.

== Honours ==
- 2 June 1953: Queen Elizabeth II Coronation Medal
- 5 December 1978: Serving Sister of the Most Venerable Order of the Hospital of Saint John of Jerusalem

== In film and television ==
In 2016, she was portrayed in the first season of The Crown. She was portrayed by Lily Travers in the 2017 film Viceroy's House.

== Published works ==
- Mountbatten, Pamela (2007). India Remembered: A Personal Account of the Mountbattens During the Transfer of Power. Foreword by India Hicks. Pavilion Books. ISBN 978-1-86205-759-3.
- ——— (2012). Daughter of Empire: Life as a Mountbatten. Weidenfeld & Nicolson. ISBN 978-0-297-86482-0.
- ——— (2024). My Years with the Queen: And Other Stories. Penguin Books. ISBN 978-1-5291-4886-2.
