= Little Green Island (Alaska) =

Island in Alaska

Geography
- Location: Chugach National Forest, Alaska
- Coordinates: 60.203988°N 147.510468°W

Administration
- US

Little Green Island is an island directly south of within the Chugach National Forest in Prince William Sound, Alaska. It lies directly south of Green Island, after which it is named, and north-west of Montague Island.
