= Little Greene =

British paint and wallpaper company

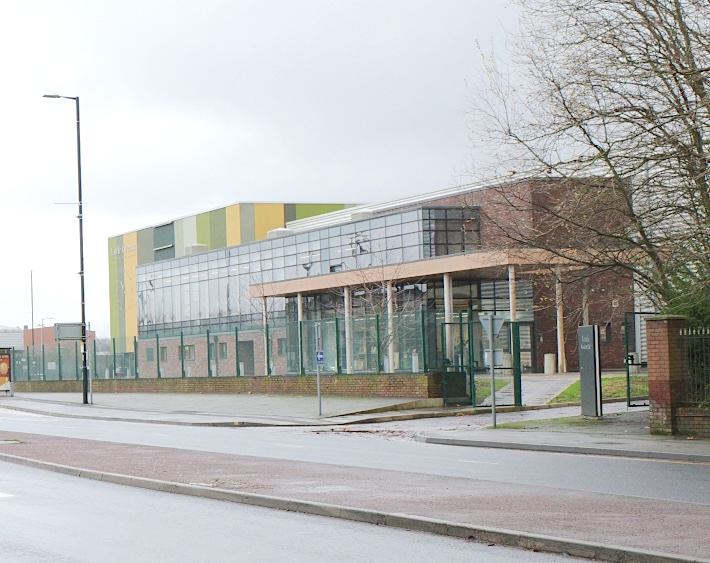
Office in Manchester, UK

Little Greene is a British wallpaper and housepaint manufacturer and retailer based in Manchester, UK.

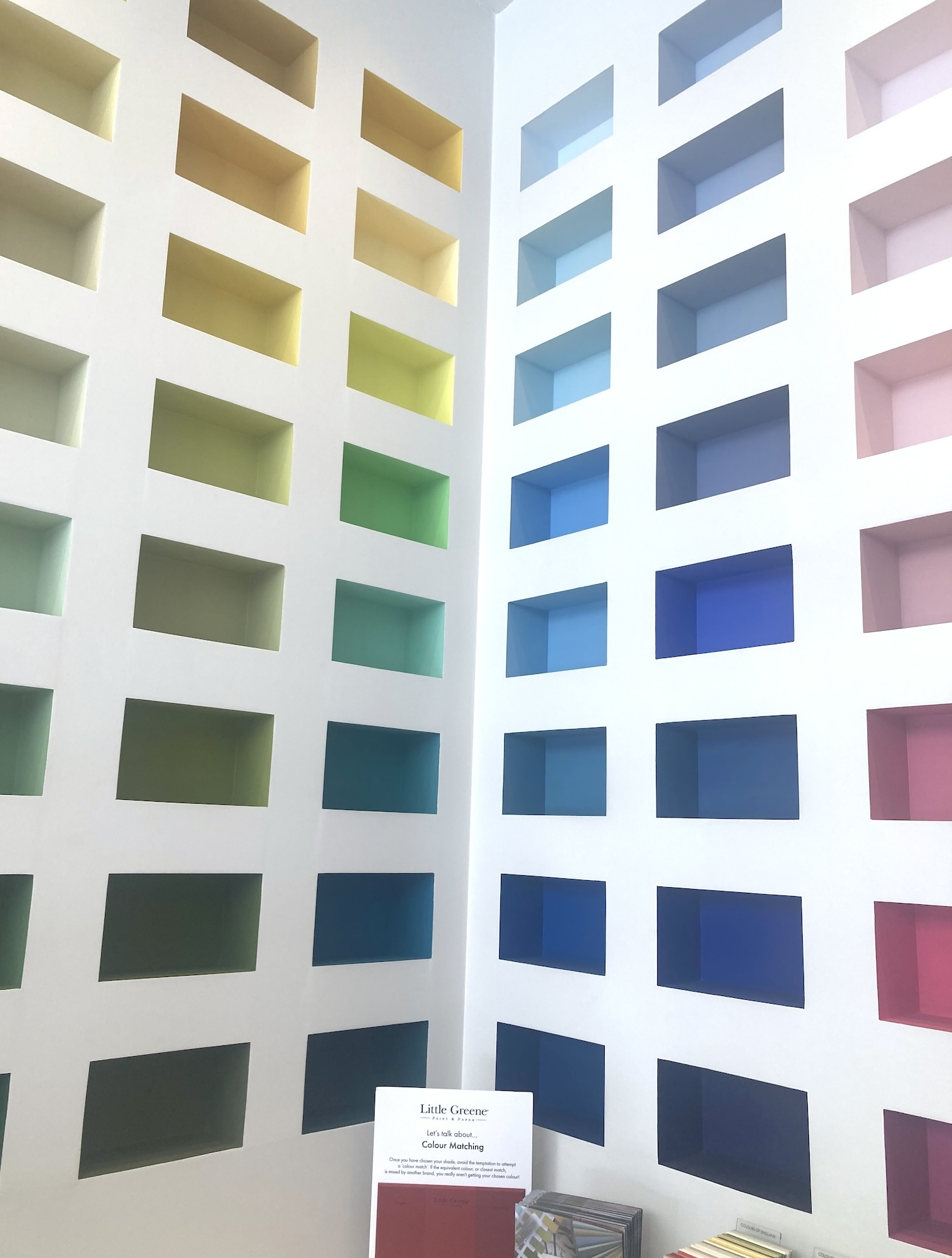
Paint colour samples

It was founded by chemist David Mottershead and as of 2026 was run by Mottershead and his family; it operates a factory in Wales. It has a partnership with the National Trust to develop designs based on the Trust's collections and create materials for restorations.

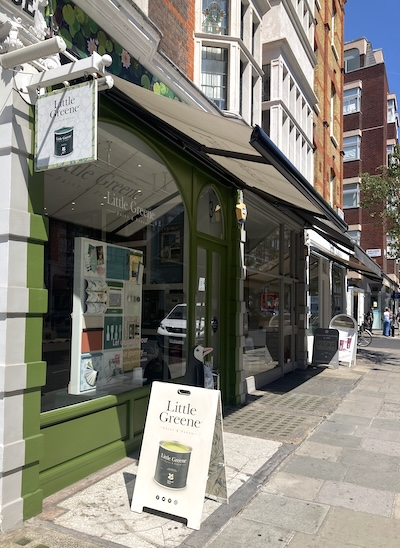
Shop frontage in London

Its name is a reference to an area of Manchester near its headquarters which was formerly named Little Greene and where a dye factory was based in the eighteenth century.
