= Brightwell Baldwin =

Village in Oxfordshire, England

Coordinates: 51.651°N 1.058°W

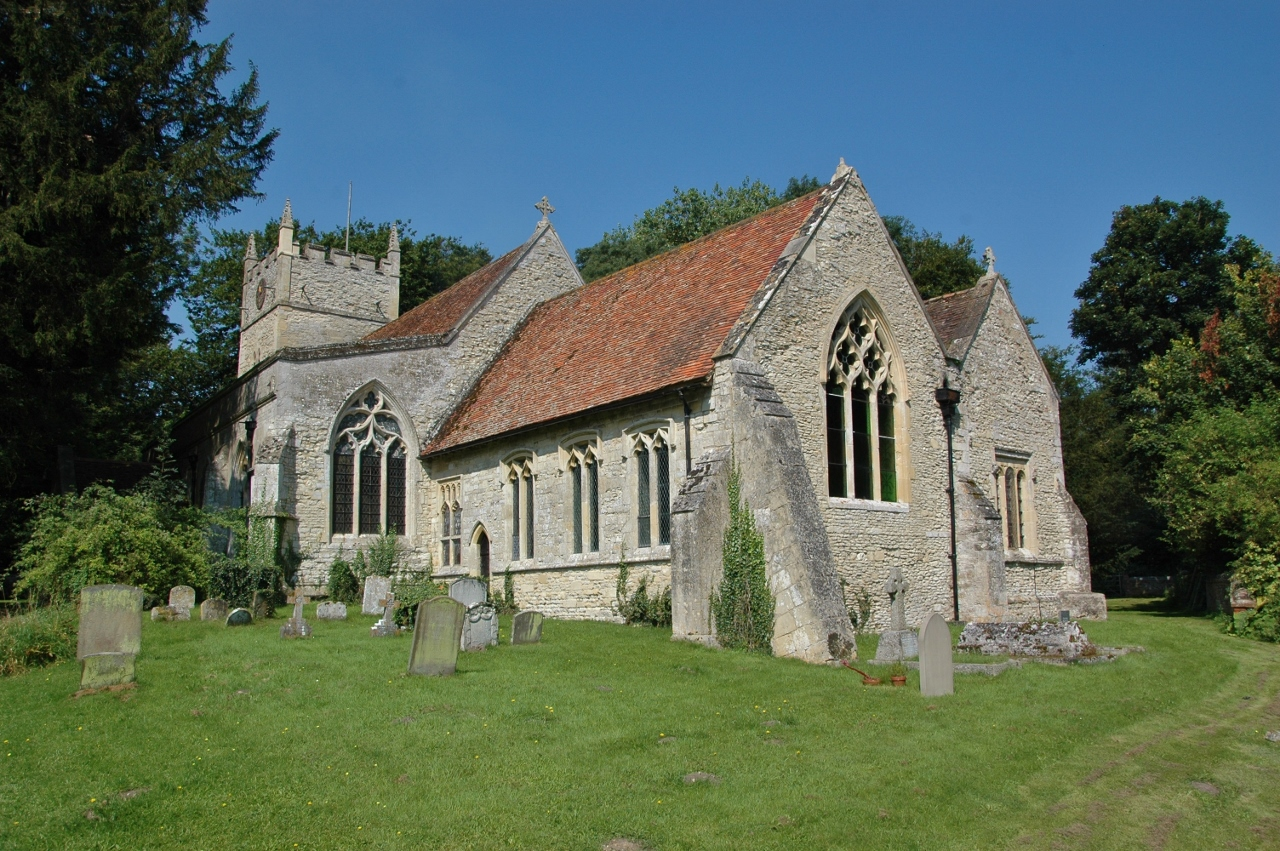
- St Bartholomew's parish church

- Location within Oxfordshire
- Area: 6.52 km^{2} (2.52 sq mi)
- Population: 208 (2011 Census)
  - Density: 32/km^{2} (83/sq mi)
- OS grid reference: SU6595
- District: South Oxfordshire
- Shire county: Oxfordshire
- Region: South East
- Country: England
- Sovereign state: United Kingdom
- Post town: Watlington
- Postcode district: OX49
- Dialling code: 01491
- Police: Thames Valley
- Fire: Oxfordshire
- Ambulance: South Central
- UK Parliament: Henley and Thame
- Website: Brightwell Baldwin Parish Meeting

Brightwell Baldwin is a village and civil parish in Oxfordshire, about 4 1/2 miles (7 km) northeast of Wallingford. It was historically in the Hundred of Ewelme and is now in the District of South Oxfordshire. The 2011 Census recorded the parish's population as 208. The parish is roughly rectangular, about 2 1/2 miles (4 km) long north–south and about 1 1/4 miles (2 km) wide east–west. In 1848 the parish covered an area of 1,569 acres (635 ha). The B4009 road linking Benson and Watlington forms part of the southern boundary of the parish. The B480 road linking Oxford and Watlington forms a small part of its northern boundary. Rumbolds Lane forms much of its western boundary. For the remainder the parish is bounded largely by field boundaries.

== Toponym ==
"Brightwell" is derived from the Old English for "bright spring". "Baldwin" is the name of a family that held the manor. The earliest known record of Brightwell Baldwin is a Saxon charter of 854 in the Cartularium Saxonicum that records the toponym as Beorhtawille or Brihtanwylle. Almost a century later a Saxon charter of 945 records it as Byrhtanwellan. The Domesday Book of 1086 records it as Bretewelle.

== Brightwell Park ==
The old country house of the Stone family burnt down in 1786, but a cruciform 17th-century dovecote that was some distance from the house survives in the park. In 1790 a replacement house was built. It has since been demolished, but its kitchen wing, stables, ice house and an 18th-century stone arch bridge in the park survive.

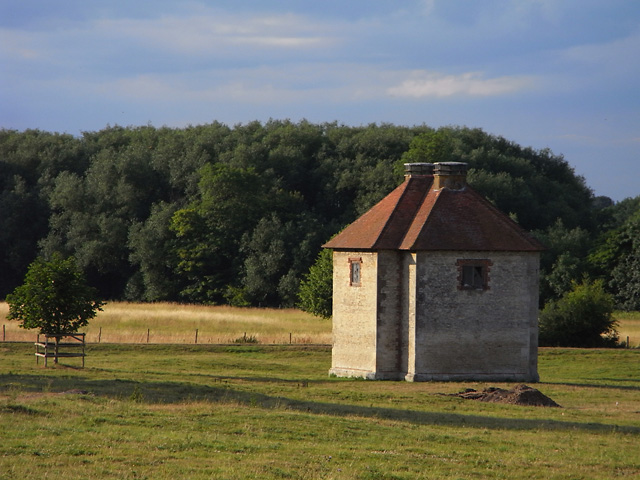
Brightwell Park's 17th-century dovecote

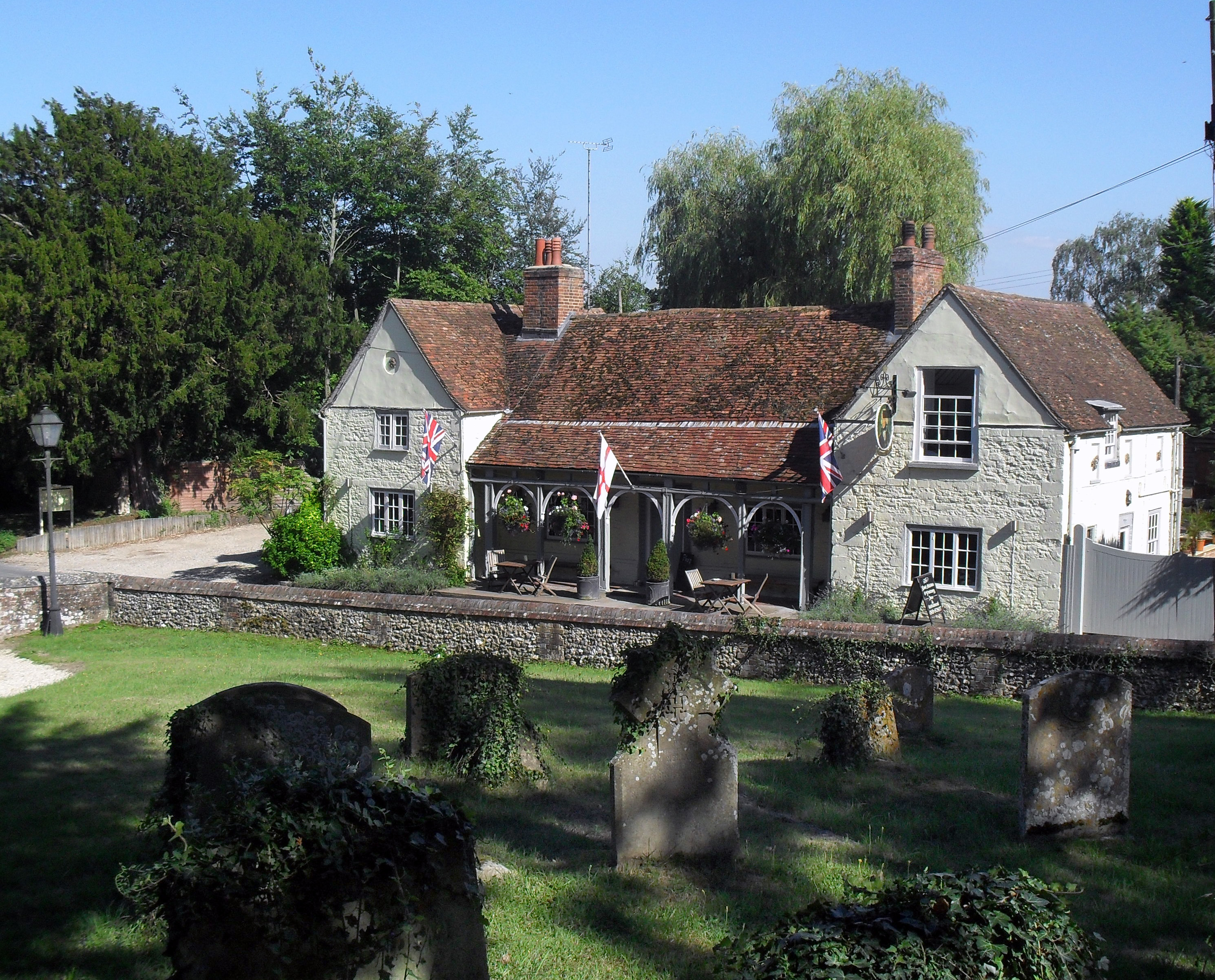
The Lord Nelson Inn, seen from St Bartholomew's parish churchyard

== Parish church ==
The earliest parts of the Church of England parish church of Saint Bartholomew are 13th century, including a stair turret and a number of lancet windows, notably in the chancel. Early in the 14th century the nave was rebuilt in the Decorated Gothic style, with north and south aisles linked to it by arcades of four bays. The west tower and the Perpendicular Gothic east window of the chancel were added in the 15th century. The pulpit and tester are Jacobean and therefore 17th century. The building was restored in 1895 and is a Grade I listed. Church monuments in St Bartholomew's include a number of brasses.

In the chancel are two brasses commemorating John Cottesmore, who died in 1439. Stone monuments include two 16th-century chest tombs of members of the Carleton family, and a substantial English Baroque monument to members of the Stone family on the east wall of the north chapel. The latter was built in about 1670 or 1690, replacing monuments to John Stone (died 1640) and his son Sir Richard Stone (died 1660) that were destroyed in the Great Fire of London in 1666. In the north aisle is a brass commemorating John the Smith, who died in 1371. It bears an epitaph written in Middle English, which may be the earliest example of an inscription in the English language. The epitaph reflects upon human mortality:

man com & se how schal alle dede li: wen þow comes bad & bare

noth hab ven ve awaẏ fare: All ẏs wermēs þ^{t} ve for care:—
bot þ^{t} ve do for godẏs luf ve haue nothyng yare:

hunyr þis graue lẏs John ye smẏth god yif his soule heuen grit

The bell tower has a ring of six bells. John Saunders of Reading, Berkshire cast the tenor bell in about 1559. Ellis I Knight, also of Reading, cast the fifth bell in 1637. Mears and Stainbank of the Whitechapel Bell Foundry cast or recast the treble, second, third and fourth bells in 1911. There is also a Sanctus bell that was cast in about 1550. St Bartholomew's parish is now part of the benefice of Ewelme, Brightwell Baldwin, Cuxham and Easington. The churchyard includes a late 18th-century chest tomb a number of 17th-century gravestones that are Grade II listed. Another 17th-century monument commemorates one Stephen Rumbold, who died in 1687 aged 105. On it a rhyming epigram bets with its readers:

He liv'd one hundred and five

Sanguine and Strong
An hundred to five

You do not live so long

== Amenities ==
Brightwell Baldwin has a 17th-century pub, The Lord Nelson Inn. It is now a gastropub. The Old Forge is a Grade II listed former blacksmiths shop: it was bought in 2002 by the Duke and Duchess of Kent.

== Sources ==
- Bertram, Jerome (2003). "Medieval Inscriptions in Oxfordshire" (PDF). Oxoniensia. LXVVIII. Oxfordshire Architectural and Historical Society: 27–54. ISSN 0308-5562.
- Ekwall, Eilert (1960) [1936]. Concise Oxford Dictionary of English Place-Names (4th ed.). Oxford: Oxford University Press. Brightwell. ISBN 0198691033.
- Lewis, Samuel, ed. (1931) [1848]. "Brightwell-Baldwin (St. Bartholomew)". A Topographical Dictionary of England (Seventh ed.). London: Samuel Lewis. pp. 375–379.
- Sherwood, Jennifer; Pevsner, Nikolaus (1974). Oxfordshire. The Buildings of England. Harmondsworth: Penguin Books. pp. 484–486. ISBN 0-14-071045-0.
- Utechin, Patricia (1990) [1980]. Epitaphs from Oxfordshire (2nd ed.). Oxford: Robert Dugdale. pp. 4, 39, 82. ISBN 0-946976-04-X.
