= Brian Boobbyer =

England international rugby union player & cricketer

Brian Boobbyer

Brian Boobbyer (25 February 1928 at Ealing, Middlesex – 17 January 2011 at Hereford) played in nine Test matches for England at rugby union between 1950 and 1952. He also played cricket at first-class level, and was awarded Blues for both sports by the University of Oxford for appearing against Cambridge. But in 1952, at the age of twenty-four, he gave up playing both games, in order to devote his life to working for the Moral Re-Armament (MRA) movement.

== Early life ==
Boobbyer was son of Keble College, Oxford-educated doctor Philip Watson Boobbyer, of 6, Woodville Road, Ealing, West London, and Vera Elizabeth (1898-1966), daughter of Edward Shaw, Bishop of Buckingham from 1914 to 1921; his uncles were Edward Shaw, who played first-class cricket and was killed in World War I, and Royal Navy Captain Robert Shaw, MBE, also a first-class cricketer.

Boobbyer was educated at Durston House preparatory school, then at Uppingham, a leading "public school", where he became Head Boy. After school, he did his National Service, during which time he first played rugby at senior club level, for Rosslyn Park. In 1948 he went up to the University of Oxford to read History at Brasenose College, already with a reputation as a good cricketer and rugby player.

== Rugby career ==
As well as playing club rugby for Rosslyn Park, Boobbyer played for Middlesex in the County Championship. He also appeared for the Barbarians. He first played for Oxford in his second year, going on to appear in three matches against Cambridge, thus achieving the distinction of becoming a "double Blue". All three matches were won.

A centre, he made his international debut for England, against Wales, on 21 January 1950. He won nine caps during this and the following two seasons, all in the Five Nations Championship, scoring two tries. He performed particularly well on an England tour of South Africa in 1951. In 1952 he was the only scorer in a 3-0 victory against Ireland.

== Cricket career ==
While at Uppingham, in 1946 Boobbyer captained a Combined Schools side, The Rest, against the Southern Schools at Lord's, acoring 61. The same year, he played for the Public Schools against Combined Services, also at Lord's, scoring 102 in the first innings.

In 1947, while doing his National Service, he played for the Army against the Royal Navy and against the Royal Air Force, both matches being played at Lord's. The following year, he again appeared for the Army against the Royal Navy, again at Lord's.

All his first-class cricket was played for Oxford University, for whom he played 40 first-class matches between 1949 and 1952. He scored 1970 runs in all at an average of 26.98, including two centuries and with a highest score of 126. Both centuries were scored against Sussex. His best season was his last, when he scored 802 runs in 13 first-class matches at an average of 34.86. He made his first appearance in the annual University Match against Cambridge in his first season of 1949, and thus was awarded his Blue. He scored what proved to be a match-winning 80 in the 1951 match. The Daily Telegraph, in its obituary, described him as "a doughty rather than a spectacular cricketer" (though adding that this could not be said of his rugby). Middlesex were interested in signing him as an opening batsman had he not given up the game.

== Work for Moral Re-Armament ==
Boobbyer joined the MRA movement whilst at Oxford. After finishing at university, he went on a rugby tour to Japan, but at the end of the tour he stayed on to work with an international MRA group which had the aim of promoting reconciliation following World War II. He devoted the rest of his life to his MRA work, and never subsequently played sport at a serious level. He later travelled for the movement to the Philippines, the USA and India, amongst many other places. He was a fine public speaker, able to put across spiritual themes in an understandable and sympathetic way.

== Personal life ==
Boobbyer married Hon. Juliet Honor Rodd (who survived him), a daughter of Francis Rodd, 2nd Baron Rennell, in 1957; they had two sons. The couple lived and worked in Oxford for many years. In 2004 his family published a paperback entitled Like a Cork out of a Bottle, containing a selection of his talks and writings. Boobbyer died at Hereford County Hospital on 17 January 2011.
