= Lord Mountbatten =

British statesman and admiral (1900–1979)

The Right Honourable The Earl Mountbatten of Burma KG GCB OM GCSI GCIE GCVO DSO ADC PC FRS
- Portrait by Allan Warren, 1976

Chief of the Defence Staff
- In office 13 July 1959 – 15 July 1965
- Prime Minister: Harold Macmillan; Alec Douglas-Home; Harold Wilson
- Preceded by: William Dickson
- Succeeded by: Richard Hull

First Sea Lord
- In office 18 April 1955 – 19 October 1959
- Prime Minister: Anthony Eden; Harold Macmillan
- Preceded by: Rhoderick McGrigor
- Succeeded by: Charles Lambe

Viceroy of India
- In office 21 February 1947 – 15 August 1947
- Monarch: George VI
- Prime Minister: Clement Attlee
- Preceded by: The Viscount Wavell
- Succeeded by: Himself (as Governor-General of India); Muhammad Ali Jinnah (as Governor-General of Pakistan)

Governor-General of India
- In office 15 August 1947 – 21 June 1948
- Monarch: George VI
- Prime Minister: Jawaharlal Nehru
- Preceded by: Himself (As Viceroy of India)
- Succeeded by: C. Rajagopalachari

Governor of the Straits Settlements
- Military administration
- In office 12 September 1945 – 31 March 1946
- Monarch: George VI
- Preceded by: Sir Shenton Thomas as civilian governor
- Succeeded by: Sir Shenton Thomas governorship continued

Member of the House of Lords
- Lord Temporal
- Hereditary peerage 13 June 1946 – 27 August 1979
- Preceded by: Peerage established
- Succeeded by: The 2nd Countess Mountbatten of Burma

Personal details
- Born: Prince Louis of Battenberg; 25 June 1900 Frogmore House, Windsor, Berkshire, England
- Died: 27 August 1979 (aged 79) Mullaghmore, County Sligo, Republic of Ireland
- Cause of death: Assassination
- Resting place: Romsey Abbey
- Spouse: Edwina Ashley (m. 1922; died 1960)
- Children: Patricia Knatchbull, 2nd Countess Mountbatten of Burma; Lady Pamela Hicks
- Parents: Louis Mountbatten, 1st Marquess of Milford Haven; Princess Victoria of Hesse and by Rhine
- Education: Christ's College, Cambridge
- Nickname: Dickie

Military service
- Allegiance: United Kingdom
- Branch/service: Royal Navy
- Years of service: 1913–1965
- Rank: Admiral of the Fleet
- Commands: See list: Chief of the Defence Staff; (1959–1965); First Sea Lord; (1955–1959); Mediterranean Fleet; (1952–1954); Fourth Sea Lord; (1950–1952); Supreme Allied Commander, South East Asia Command; (1943–1946); Chief of Combined Operations; (1941–1943); HMS Illustrious; (1941); HMS Kelly; (1939–1941); HMS Wishart; (1934–1936); HMS Daring; (1934)
- Battles/wars: First World War; Second World War
- Awards: Full list

Louis Francis Albert Victor Nicholas Mountbatten, 1st Earl Mountbatten of Burma (born Prince Louis of Battenberg; (Note: Mountbatten's family dropped their princely titles in 1917, after which he was styled Lord Louis Mountbatten until 1946. He was styled The Viscount Mountbatten of Burma from 1946 to 1947.) 25 June 1900 – 27 August 1979), commonly known as Lord Mountbatten, was a British statesman, naval officer, and member of the British royal family. A maternal uncle of Prince Philip and second cousin once removed of Queen Elizabeth II, he served in the Royal Navy during both world wars and rose to become Supreme Allied Commander, South East Asia Command, in the later stages of the Second World War. He subsequently oversaw the transition of India to independence as the last Viceroy of British India and the first governor-general of independent India. In these positions he oversaw British India's partition into the Dominions of India and Pakistan and the integration of the princely states into India.

Mountbatten later held senior posts in the post‑war armed forces, serving as First Sea Lord and then as Chief of the Defence Staff until 1965, making him the longest-serving professional head of the British Armed Forces to date. During this period Mountbatten also served as chairman of the NATO Military Committee for a year. He remained closely associated with the royal family throughout his life and acted as a mentor to his great‑nephew, the future King Charles III. Beyond his official duties, he was active in international education, naval and sporting organisations, and a range of charitable and cultural initiatives.

His career and reputation have been the subject of considerable debate. Admirers highlighted his energy, charm, and administrative ability, while critics accused him of vanity, self‑promotion, and flawed judgement, particularly in relation to the partition of India and his wartime assessments in South East Asia. His private life attracted scrutiny, and after his death allegations of child sexual abuse were made.

In August 1979, Mountbatten was assassinated by the Provisional Irish Republican Army when a bomb exploded aboard his fishing boat in Mullaghmore, County Sligo. His death prompted widespread condemnation and international mourning, and he received a ceremonial funeral at Westminster Abbey.

== Early life ==
Mountbatten, then styled Prince Louis of Battenberg, was born on 25 June 1900 at Frogmore House in the Home Park, Windsor, Berkshire. He was the youngest child and second son of Prince Louis of Battenberg and his wife Princess Victoria of Hesse and by Rhine. Mountbatten's maternal grandparents were Louis IV, Grand Duke of Hesse, and Princess Alice of the United Kingdom, a daughter of Queen Victoria and Prince Albert of Saxe-Coburg and Gotha. His paternal grandparents were Prince Alexander of Hesse and by Rhine and Julia, Princess of Battenberg. Their marriage was morganatic, as Julia was not of royal lineage; consequently, Mountbatten and his father bore the style Serene Highness rather than Royal Highness, were ineligible for the title Princes of Hesse, and held the lesser Battenberg designation. His elder siblings were Princess Alice of Battenberg (mother of Prince Philip, Duke of Edinburgh), Princess Louise of Battenberg (later Queen Louise of Sweden), and Prince George of Battenberg (later George Mountbatten, 2nd Marquess of Milford Haven).

Mountbatten was baptised in the large drawing room of Frogmore House on 17 July by the Dean of Windsor, Philip Eliot. His godparents were Queen Victoria (his maternal great-grandmother), Nicholas II of Russia (his maternal uncle through marriage and paternal second cousin, represented by the child's father) and Prince Francis Joseph of Battenberg (his paternal uncle, represented by Lord Edward Clinton). He wore the original 1841 royal christening gown at the ceremony.

Mountbatten's nickname among family and friends was "Dickie"; although "Richard" was not among his given names. His great-grandmother, Queen Victoria, had originally suggested "Nicky", but as the name was already widely used within the Russian imperial family (particularly for Nicholas II), it was altered to "Dickie" to avoid confusion.

Mountbatten was educated at home for the first ten years of his life; he was then sent to Lockers Park School in Hertfordshire and later to the Royal Naval College, Osborne, in May 1913.

Mountbatten's mother's younger sister was Alexandra Feodorovna, the Empress of Russia. As a child he visited the imperial court at St Petersburg and became close to the Russian imperial family, harbouring romantic feelings for his maternal first cousin Grand Duchess Maria Nikolaevna, whose photograph he kept at his bedside for the rest of his life.

Mountbatten adopted his surname as a result of World War I. From 1914 to 1918, Britain and its allies were at war with the Central Powers, led by the German Empire. To appease British nationalist sentiment, in 1917 King George V issued a royal proclamation changing the name of the British royal house from the German House of Saxe-Coburg and Gotha to the House of Windsor. The King's British relatives with German names and titles followed suit, with Mountbatten's father adopting the surname Mountbatten, an anglicisation of Battenberg. His father was subsequently created Marquess of Milford Haven.

== First World War ==
At the age of 16, Mountbatten was posted as midshipman to the battlecruiser HMS Lion in July 1916 and, after seeing action in August, transferred to the battleship HMS Queen Elizabeth during the closing phases of the First World War. In 1917, when the royal family abandoned their German names and titles and adopted the more British-sounding "Windsor", Mountbatten acquired the courtesy title appropriate to a younger son of a marquess, becoming known as Lord Louis Mountbatten (Lord Louis for short) until he was created a peer in his own right in 1946. He paid a ten-day visit to the Western Front in July 1918.

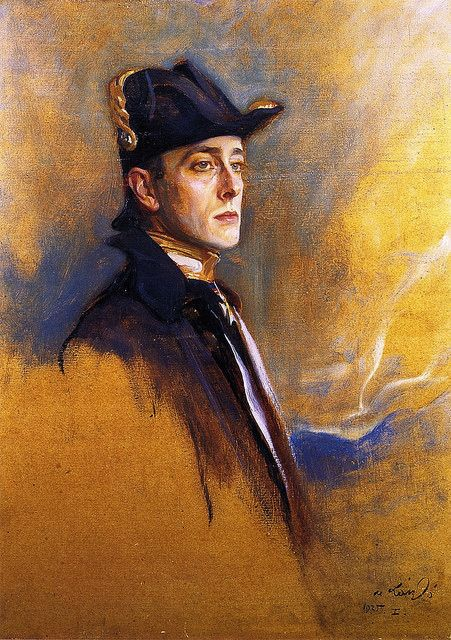
Portrait by Philip de László, 1925

While still an acting-sub-lieutenant, Mountbatten was appointed first lieutenant (second-in-command) of the P-class sloop HMS P. 31 on 13 October 1918 and was confirmed as a substantive sub-lieutenant on 15 January 1919. HMS P. 31 took part in the Peace River Pageant on 4 April 1919. Mountbatten attended Christ's College, Cambridge, for two terms from October 1919, studying English literature (including John Milton and Lord Byron) in a programme designed to augment the education of junior officers whose studies had been curtailed by the war. He was elected for a term to the Standing Committee of the Cambridge Union Society and was suspected of sympathy for the Labour Party, then emerging as a potential party of government for the first time.

== Interwar period ==
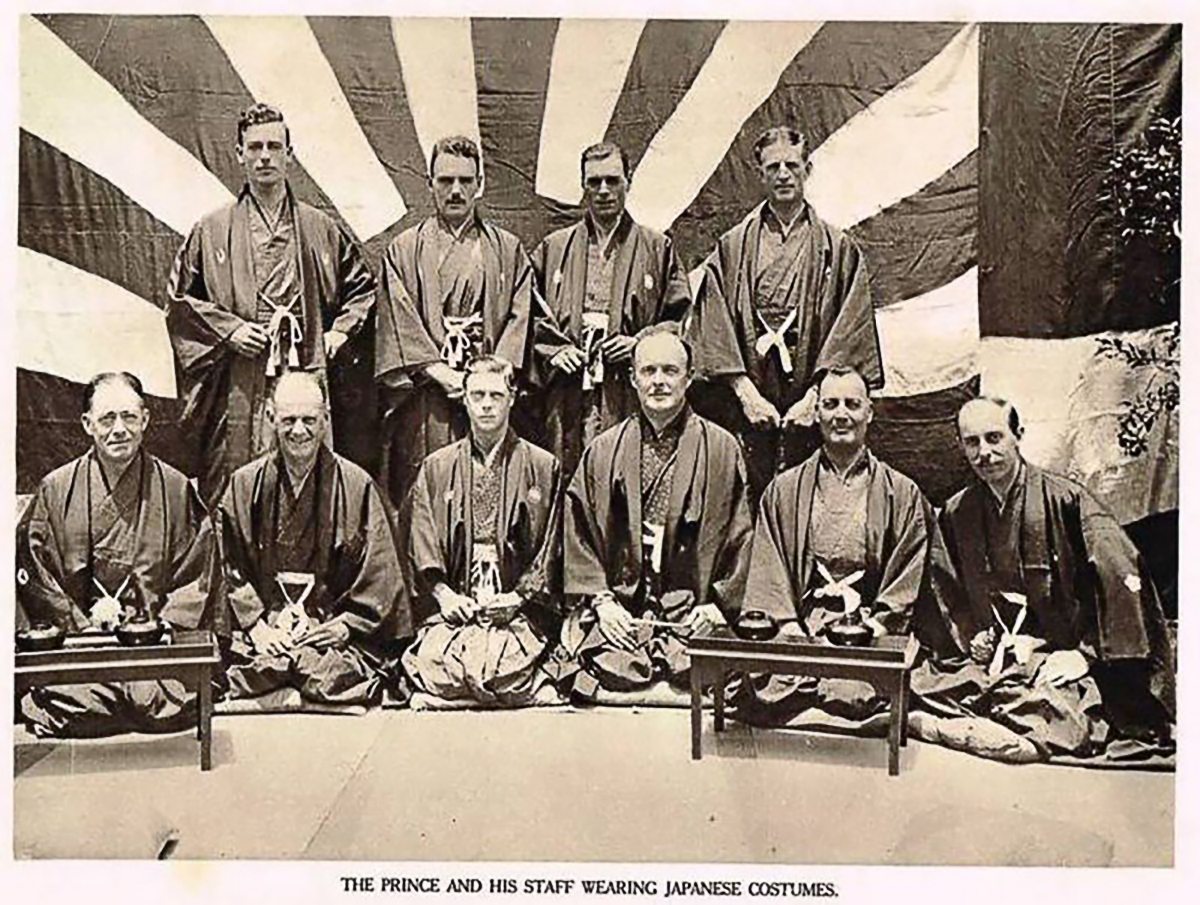
Prince Edward with his staff all wearing kimono during the Pacific visit to Japan in 1922. (Mountbatten standing, first from left). The Rising Sun Flag in the background.

Mountbatten was posted to the battlecruiser HMS Renown in March 1920 and accompanied Edward, Prince of Wales, on a royal tour of Australia. He was promoted lieutenant on 15 April 1920. HMS Renown returned to Portsmouth on 11 October 1920. Early in 1921, Royal Navy personnel were deployed for civil defence duties as serious industrial unrest appeared imminent, and Mountbatten was required to command a platoon of stokers in Northern England, many of whom had never handled a rifle before. He transferred to the battlecruiser HMS Repulse in March 1921 and again accompanied the Prince of Wales, this time on a royal tour of India and Japan. Edward and Mountbatten formed a close friendship during the trip. Mountbatten survived the deep defence cuts known as the Geddes Axe; fifty-two percent of the officers of his year had left the Royal Navy by the end of 1923. Although he was highly regarded by his superiors, it was rumoured that wealthy and well-connected officers were more likely to be retained. He was posted to the battleship HMS Revenge in the Mediterranean Fleet in January 1923.

Pursuing his interests in technological development and gadgetry, Mountbatten joined the Portsmouth Signals School in August 1924 and then briefly studied electronics at the Royal Naval College, Greenwich. He became a Member of the Institution of Electrical Engineers (IEE), now the Institution of Engineering and Technology (IET). He was posted to the battleship HMS Centurion in the Reserve Fleet in 1926 and became Assistant Fleet Wireless and Signals Officer of the Mediterranean Fleet under Admiral Sir Roger Keyes in January 1927. Promoted lieutenant commander on 15 April 1928, Mountbatten returned to the Signals School in July 1929 as Senior Wireless Instructor. He was appointed Fleet Wireless Officer to the Mediterranean Fleet in August 1931 and, having been promoted commander on 31 December 1932, was posted to the battleship HMS Resolution.

In 1934, Mountbatten received his first command, the destroyer HMS Daring. He was tasked with sailing the new ship to Singapore and exchanging her for the older destroyer HMS Wishart. He successfully brought Wishart back to Malta and then attended the funeral of George V in January 1936. Mountbatten was appointed a personal naval aide-de-camp to King Edward VIII on 23 June 1936, and, having joined the Naval Air Division of the Admiralty in July 1936, he attended the coronation of George VI and Elizabeth in May 1937. He was promoted captain on 30 June 1937 and was given command of the destroyer HMS Kelly in June 1939.

Within the Admiralty, Mountbatten was known as "The Master of Disaster" for his penchant for getting into difficult situations.

== Second World War ==
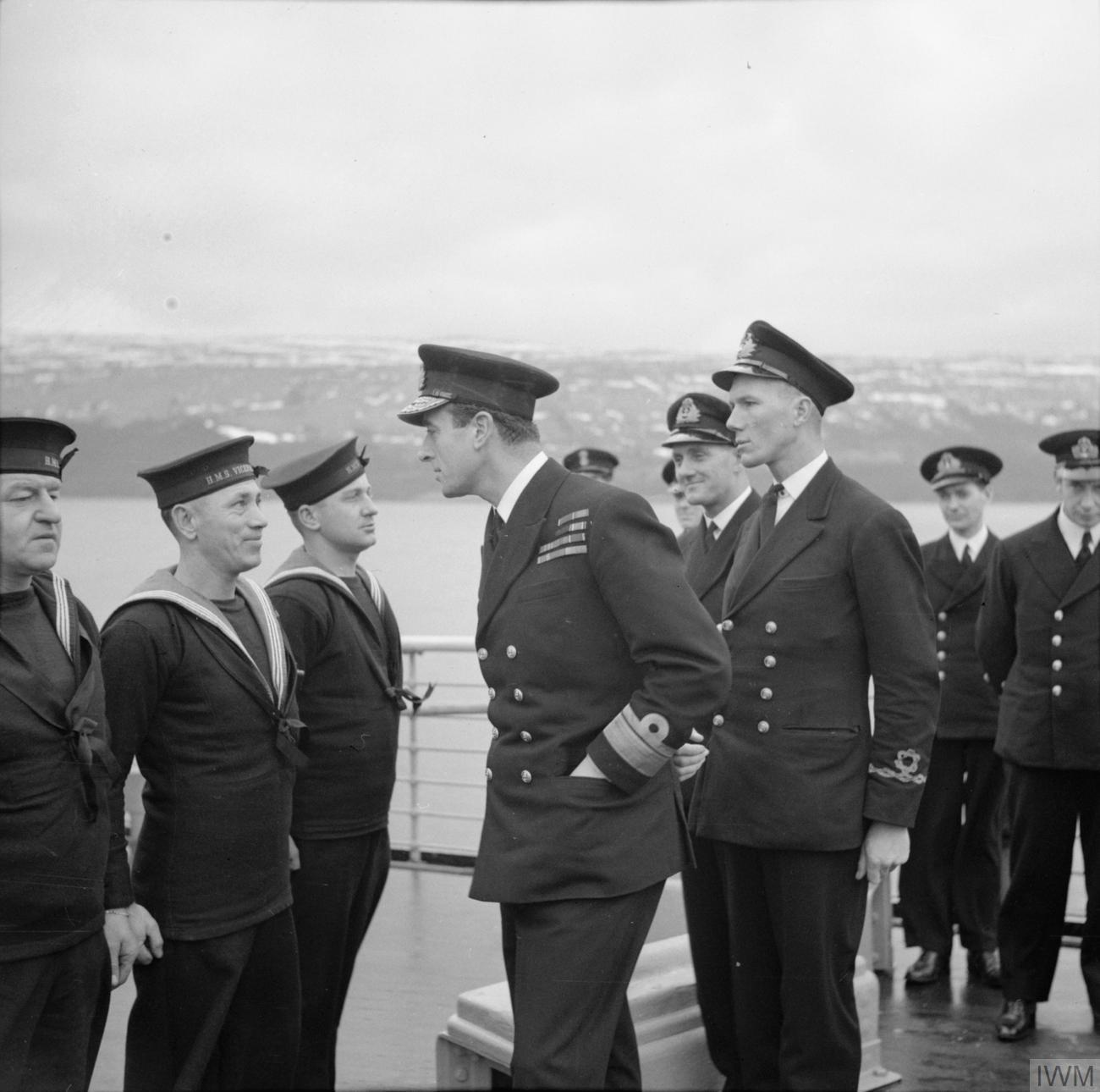
Mountbatten inspecting sailors before the Bruneval Raid, February 1942

When the World War Two broke out in September 1939, Mountbatten became Captain (D) (commander) of the 5th Destroyer Flotilla aboard HMS Kelly, which soon became noted for its exploits. In late 1939 he brought the Duke of Windsor back from exile in France, and in early May 1940 Mountbatten led a British convoy through fog to evacuate Allied forces participating in the Namsos campaign during the Norwegian campaign.

On the night of 9–10 May 1940, Kelly was torpedoed amidships by a German E-boat S 31 off the Dutch coast, and Mountbatten thereafter commanded the 5th Destroyer Flotilla from the destroyer HMS Javelin. On 29 November 1940, the Flotilla engaged three German destroyers off Lizard Point, Cornwall. Mountbatten turned to port to match a German course change, a move described as "a rather disastrous" one, as the directors swung off and lost target, resulting in Javelin being struck by two torpedoes. He rejoined Kelly in December 1940, by which time her torpedo damage had been repaired.

Kelly was sunk by German dive bombers on 23 May 1941 during the Battle of Crete, an incident that later served as the basis for Noël Coward's film In Which We Serve. Coward, a personal friend of Mountbatten, incorporated some of his speeches into the film. Mountbatten was mentioned in dispatches on 9 August 1940 and 21 March 1941, and was awarded the Distinguished Service Order in January 1941.

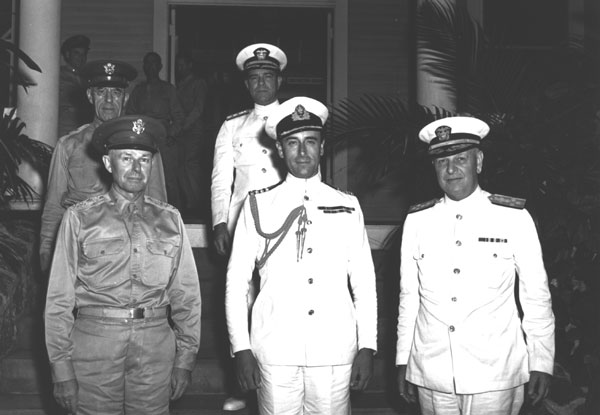
(Front row, L–R) Walter Short, Mountbatten and Husband E. Kimmel (Back row) Frederick Martin and Patrick Bellinger in Hawaii 1941

In August 1941, Mountbatten was appointed captain of the aircraft carrier HMS Illustrious, which was in Norfolk, Virginia, for repairs following action at Malta in January. During this period of relative inactivity, he paid a flying visit to Pearl Harbor, three months before the Japanese attack. Mountbatten was appalled at the US naval base's lack of preparedness and, drawing on Japan's history of launching wars with surprise attacks, the recent British success at the Battle of Taranto, and the demonstrated effectiveness of aircraft against warships, accurately predicted that the United States would enter the war after a Japanese surprise attack on Pearl Harbor.

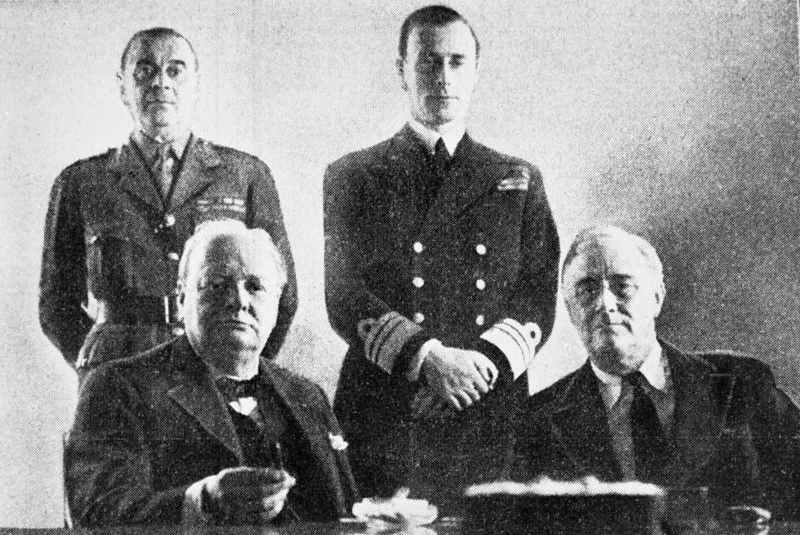
Clockwise from lower right, Franklin D. Roosevelt, Winston Churchill, Sir Hastings 'Pug' Ismay, Mountbatten: January 1943 at the Casablanca Conference

Mountbatten was a favourite of Winston Churchill. On 27 October 1941, Mountbatten replaced Admiral of the Fleet Sir Roger Keyes as Chief of Combined Operations Headquarters and was promoted to commodore. His duties in this role included devising new technical aids to support opposed landings. Noteworthy technical achievements by Mountbatten and his staff included the construction of "PLUTO", an underwater oil pipeline to Normandy; an artificial Mulberry harbour built from concrete caissons and sunken ships; and the development of tank-landing ships. Mountbatten also proposed Project Habakkuk to Churchill, an ambitious plan for an unsinkable 600-metre aircraft carrier made from reinforced ice ("Pykrete"). The project was never carried out due to its enormous cost.

As commander of Combined Operations, Mountbatten and his staff planned the highly successful Bruneval raid, which gained important intelligence and captured part of a German Würzburg radar installation, along with one of its technicians, on 27 February 1942. Mountbatten recognised that surprise and speed were essential to securing the radar and concluded that an airborne assault was the only viable method.

On 18 March 1942, he was promoted to the acting rank of vice admiral and given the honorary ranks of lieutenant general and air marshal to provide the authority required for his duties in Combined Operations. Despite the misgivings of General Sir Alan Brooke, the Chief of the Imperial General Staff, Mountbatten was placed on the Chiefs of Staff Committee. He was in large part responsible for the planning and organisation of the St Nazaire Raid on 28 March, which put out of action one of the most heavily defended docks in Nazi-occupied France until well after the war's end, a result that contributed to Allied supremacy in the Battle of the Atlantic.

After the successes at Bruneval and St Nazaire came the disastrous Dieppe Raid of 19 August 1942. Mountbatten was central to the planning and promotion of the assault, which proved a marked failure, with casualties of almost 60%, the great majority of them Canadians. In the aftermath, he became a controversial figure in Canada, and the Royal Canadian Legion distanced itself from him during later visits. His relations with Canadian veterans, who blamed him for the losses, "remained frosty" after the war.

Mountbatten claimed that the lessons learned from the Dieppe Raid were necessary for planning the Normandy invasion on D-Day nearly two years later. However, military historians such as Major General Julian Thompson, a former Royal Marine, have argued that these lessons should not have required a debacle such as Dieppe to be recognised. Nevertheless, as a direct result of the failings, the British introduced several innovations, most notably Hobart's Funnies, specialised armoured vehicles which, during the Normandy Landings, undoubtedly saved many lives on the three Commonwealth beachheads of Gold, Juno, and Sword.

=== SEAC and Burma campaign ===
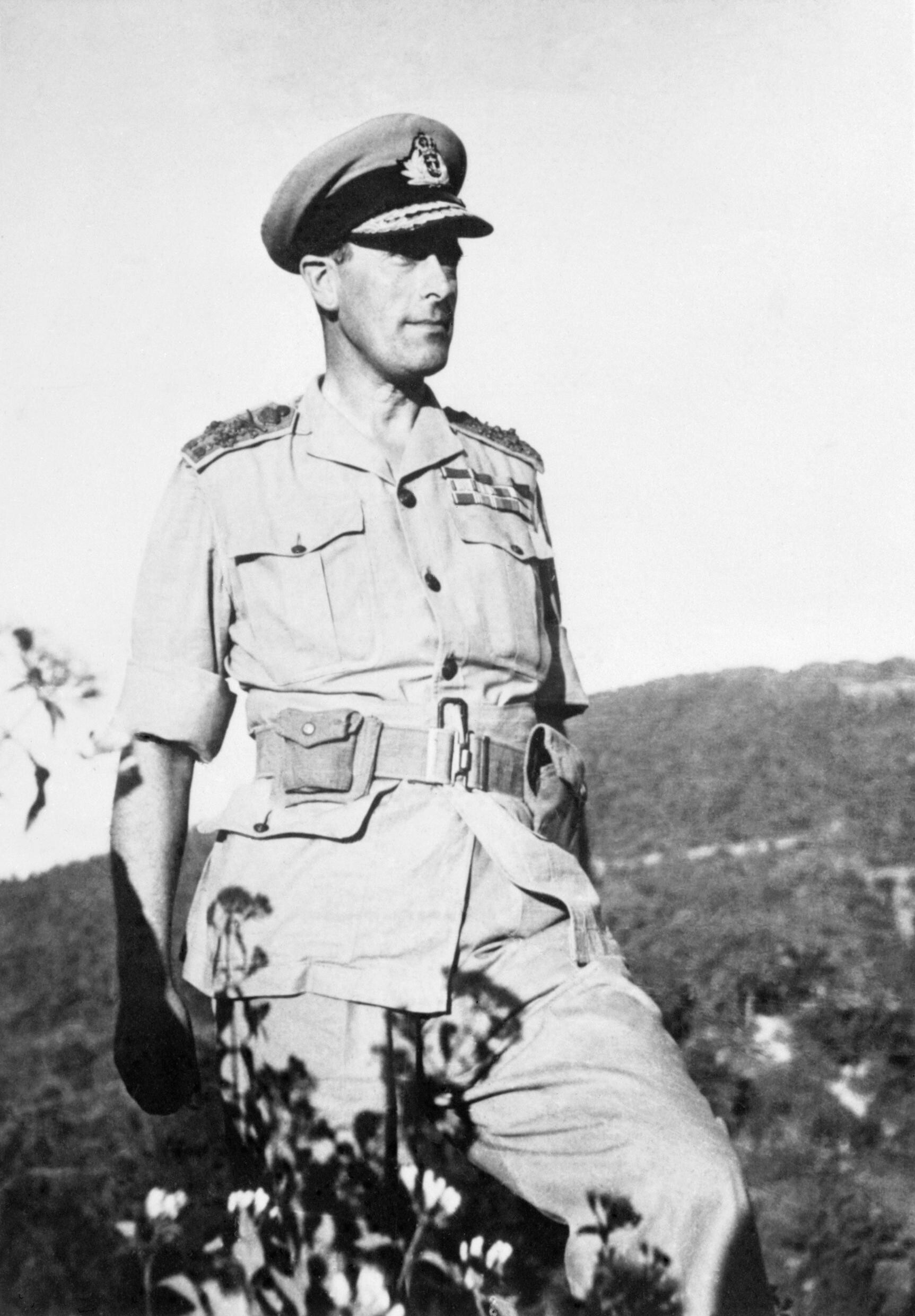
Mountbatten during his tour of the Arakan campaign in Burma in February 1944

In August 1943, Churchill appointed Mountbatten Supreme Allied Commander, South East Asia Command (SEAC), with promotion to acting full admiral. His less practical ideas were sidelined by an experienced planning staff led by Lieutenant-Colonel James Allason, although some proposals, such as an amphibious assault near Rangoon, reached Churchill before being quashed.

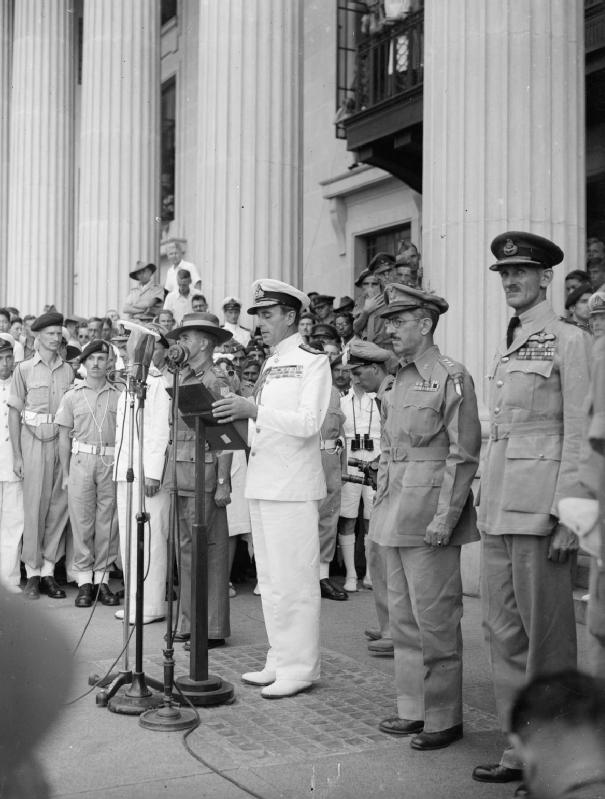
Mountbatten's address on the steps of Singapore's Municipal Building after the surrender

British interpreter Hugh Lunghi recounted an embarrassing episode during the Potsdam Conference when Mountbatten, hoping for an invitation to visit the Soviet Union, repeatedly attempted to impress Joseph Stalin with his former connections to the Russian imperial family. The attempt fell flat, with Stalin dryly inquiring whether "it was some time ago that he had been there". Lunghi later recalled, "The meeting was embarrassing because Stalin was so unimpressed. He offered no invitation. Mountbatten left with his tail between his legs."

During his time as Supreme Allied Commander of the Southeast Asia Theatre, Mountbatten's command oversaw the recapture of Burma from the Japanese by General Sir William Slim. A personal high point was the receipt of the Japanese surrender in Singapore, when British troops returned to the island to accept the formal capitulation of Japanese forces in the region, led by General Itagaki Seishiro on 12 September 1945, in an operation codenamed Tiderace. South East Asia Command was disbanded in May 1946, and Mountbatten returned home with the substantive rank of rear-admiral. That year, he was made a Knight Companion of the Garter and created Viscount Mountbatten of Burma, of Romsey in the County of Southampton, as a victory title for war service. In 1947, he was further created Earl Mountbatten of Burma and Baron Romsey, of Romsey in the County of Southampton.

Following the war, Mountbatten largely shunned the Japanese out of respect for his men killed during the conflict, and, in accordance with his will, Japan was not invited to send diplomatic representatives to his funeral in 1979. He did, however, meet Emperor Hirohito during the latter's state visit to Britain in 1971, reportedly at the urging of the Queen.

== Viceroy of India ==
Mountbatten's experience in the region, and in particular his perceived Labour sympathies at the time, together with his wife's longstanding friendship and collaboration with V. K. Krishna Menon, led Menon to put forward Mountbatten's name alone as a viceregal candidate acceptable to the Indian National Congress, in clandestine meetings with Sir Stafford Cripps and Clement Attlee. Attlee advised King George VI to appoint Mountbatten Viceroy of India on 20 February 1947, charging him with overseeing the transition of British India to independence no later than 30 June 1948. Mountbatten's instructions were to avoid partition and preserve a united India as the outcome of the transfer of power, but he was authorised to adapt to a changing situation in order to secure Britain's prompt withdrawal with minimal reputational damage.

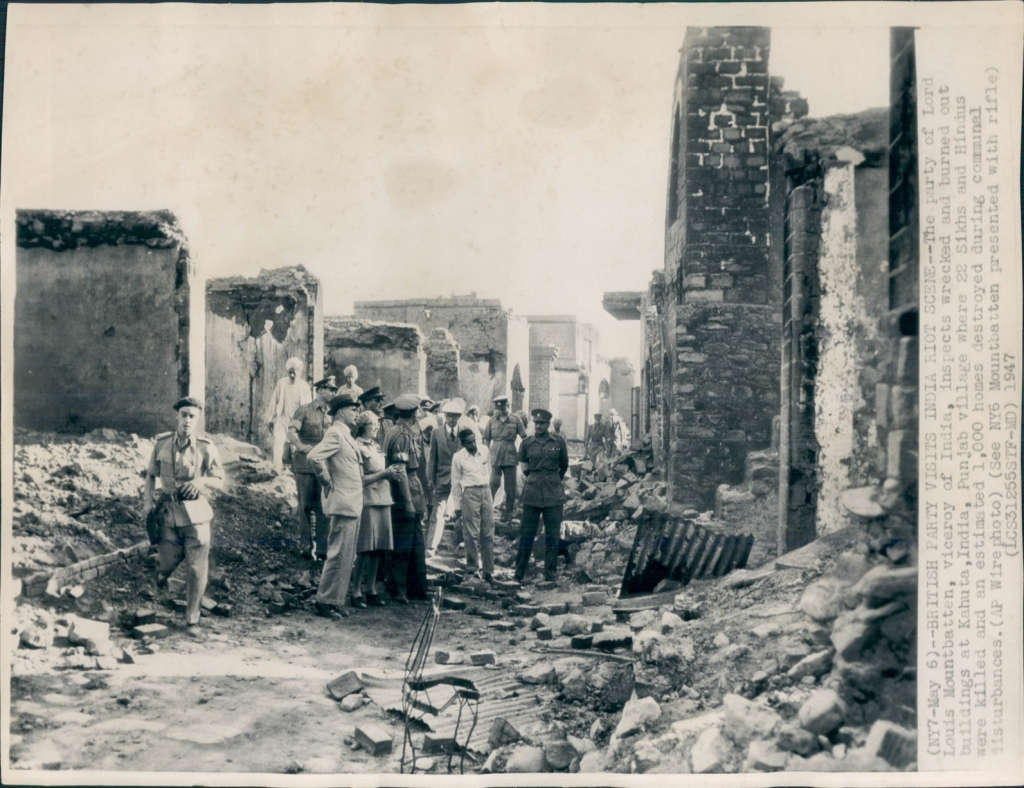
Lord and Lady Mountbatten visit an affected village in the aftermath of the Rawalpindi Massacres

Mountbatten arrived in India on 22 March by air from London. That evening, he was taken to his residence, and two days later he took the viceregal oath. His arrival coincided with large-scale communal riots in Delhi and Bombay, and large-scale massacres in Rawalpindi. Mountbatten concluded that the situation was too volatile to wait even a year before granting independence. Although his advisers favoured a gradual transfer of power, he decided that the only viable course was a quick and orderly handover of power the end of 1947; in his view, any longer risked civil war. Mountbatten also hurried the process so that he could return to the Royal Navy.

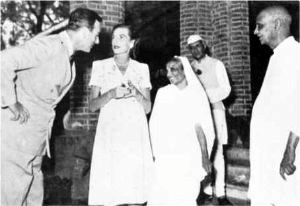
Lord and Lady Mountbatten at Mussoorie with Congress leader Sardar Patel, his daughter Manibehn Patel and Nehru in the background

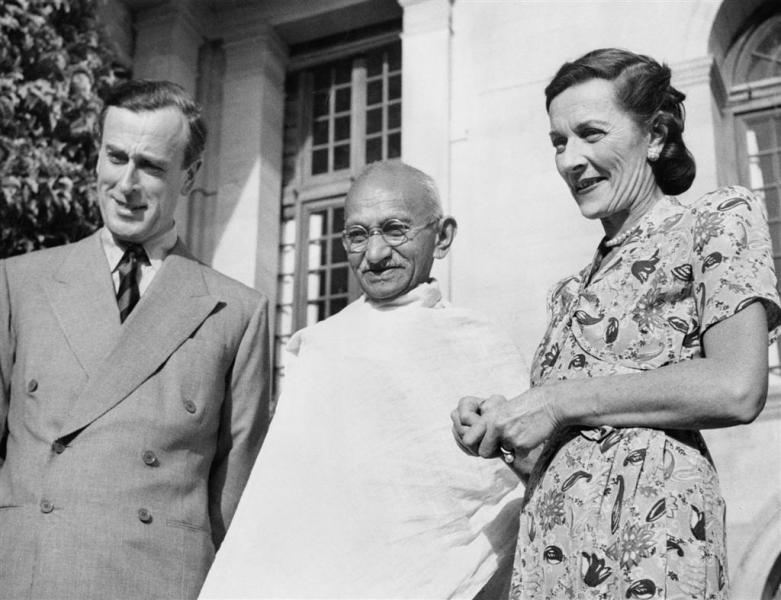
Lord and Lady Mountbatten with Mahatma Gandhi, 1947

Mountbatten was fond of Congress leader Jawaharlal Nehru and his liberal outlook for the country, and, through the efforts of their close mutual friend, Krishna Menon, developed a depth of feeling and intimacy with Nehru that was shared by his wife, Edwina. He felt differently about the Muslim League leader Muhammad Ali Jinnah, but recognised his influence, stating "If it could be said that any single man held the future of India in the palm of his hand in 1947, that man was Mohammad Ali Jinnah." During his meeting with Jinnah on 5 April 1947, Mountbatten tried to persuade him of the merits of a united India, citing the difficulty of dividing the mixed provinces of Punjab and Bengal, but Jinnah remained unyielding in his goal of establishing a separate Muslim state called Pakistan.

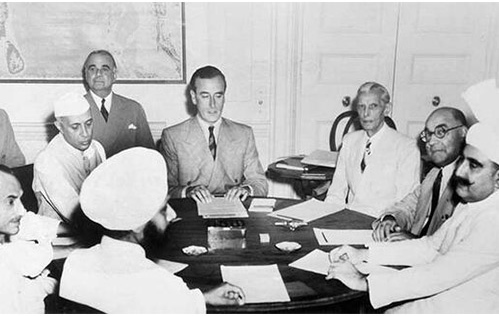
Mountbatten meeting with Jawaharlal Nehru (left) and Muhammad Ali Jinnah (right) in discussing the partition of British India, 1947.

Given the British government's recommendation to grant independence quickly, Mountbatten concluded that a united India was no longer an achievable goal and resigned himself to a plan for partition, creating the independent nations of India and Pakistan. He set a date for the transfer of power from the British to the Indians, arguing that a fixed timeline would demonstrate both his and the British government's sincerity in working towards a swift and efficient independence, and would remove any possibility of stalling the process.

Mountbatten's proposed flag for India, consisting of the flag of the Indian National Congress defaced with a Union Jack in the canton. It was rejected by Nehru, as he felt that the more extremist members of Congress would see the inclusion of the Union Jack on an Indian flag as pandering to the British.

Mountbatten's proposed flag for Pakistan, consisting of the flag of the Muslim League defaced with a Union Jack in the canton. It was rejected by Jinnah, as he felt that a flag featuring a Christian Cross alongside the Islamic Crescent would be unacceptable to the Muslims of Pakistan.

Among the Indian leaders, Mahatma Gandhi emphatically insisted on maintaining a united India and for a time successfully rallied support for this goal. During his meeting with Mountbatten, Gandhi asked him to invite Jinnah to form a new central government, but Mountbatten never conveyed Gandhi's proposal to Jinnah. When Mountbatten's accelerated timeline offered the prospect of attaining independence soon, political sentiment shifted. Given Mountbatten's determination, the inability of Nehru and Sardar Patel to reach an accommodation with the Muslim League, and Jinnah's obstinacy, all Indian party leaders (except Gandhi) acquiesced to Jinnah's plan to divide India, which in turn eased Mountbatten's task. Mountbatten also developed a strong relationship with the Indian princes, who ruled those parts of India not directly under British administration, and his intervention was decisive in persuading the vast majority of them to see the advantages of joining the Indian Union. On one hand, the integration of the princely states can be viewed as a positive aspect of his legacy, but on the other, the refusal of Hyderabad, Jammu, and Kashmir, and Junagadh to join one of the dominions contributed to future wars between Pakistan and India.

Mountbatten brought forward the date of partition from June 1948 to 15 August 1947. The uncertainty surrounding the future borders prompted Muslims and Hindus to move towards areas where they believed they would be in the majority. Both communities were deeply fearful, and the movement of Muslims from the East was matched by a similar movement of Hindus from the West. A boundary committee chaired by Sir Cyril Radcliffe was charged with drawing the borders of the new nations. With a mandate to leave as many Hindus and Sikhs in India, and as many Muslims in Pakistan, as possible, Radcliffe produced a map that divided the two countries along the Punjab and Bengal borders. This left 14 million people on the "wrong" side of the line, and many fled to "safety" on the other side when the boundaries were announced.

=== Independence of India and Pakistan ===
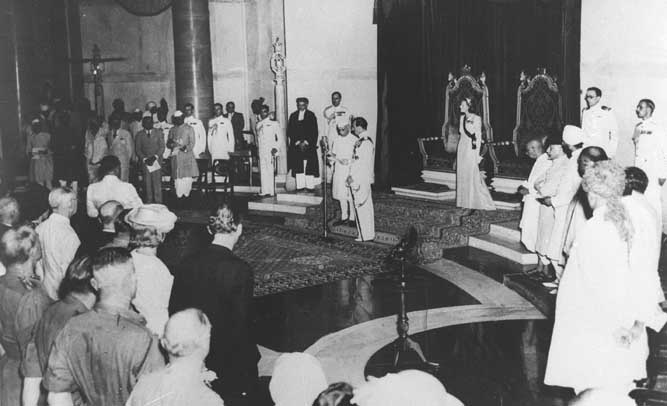
Mountbatten with Jawaharlal Nehru, the first Prime Minister of sovereign India, in Government House. Lady Mountbatten is standing to their left.

When India and Pakistan attained independence at midnight on 14–15 August 1947, Mountbatten was alone in his study at the Viceroy's House. At 12 am, as a final act of showmanship, he created Joan Falkiner, the Australian wife of the Nawab of Palanpur, a highness – a gesture that was reportedly one of his favourite duties, and one that was annulled at the stroke of midnight.

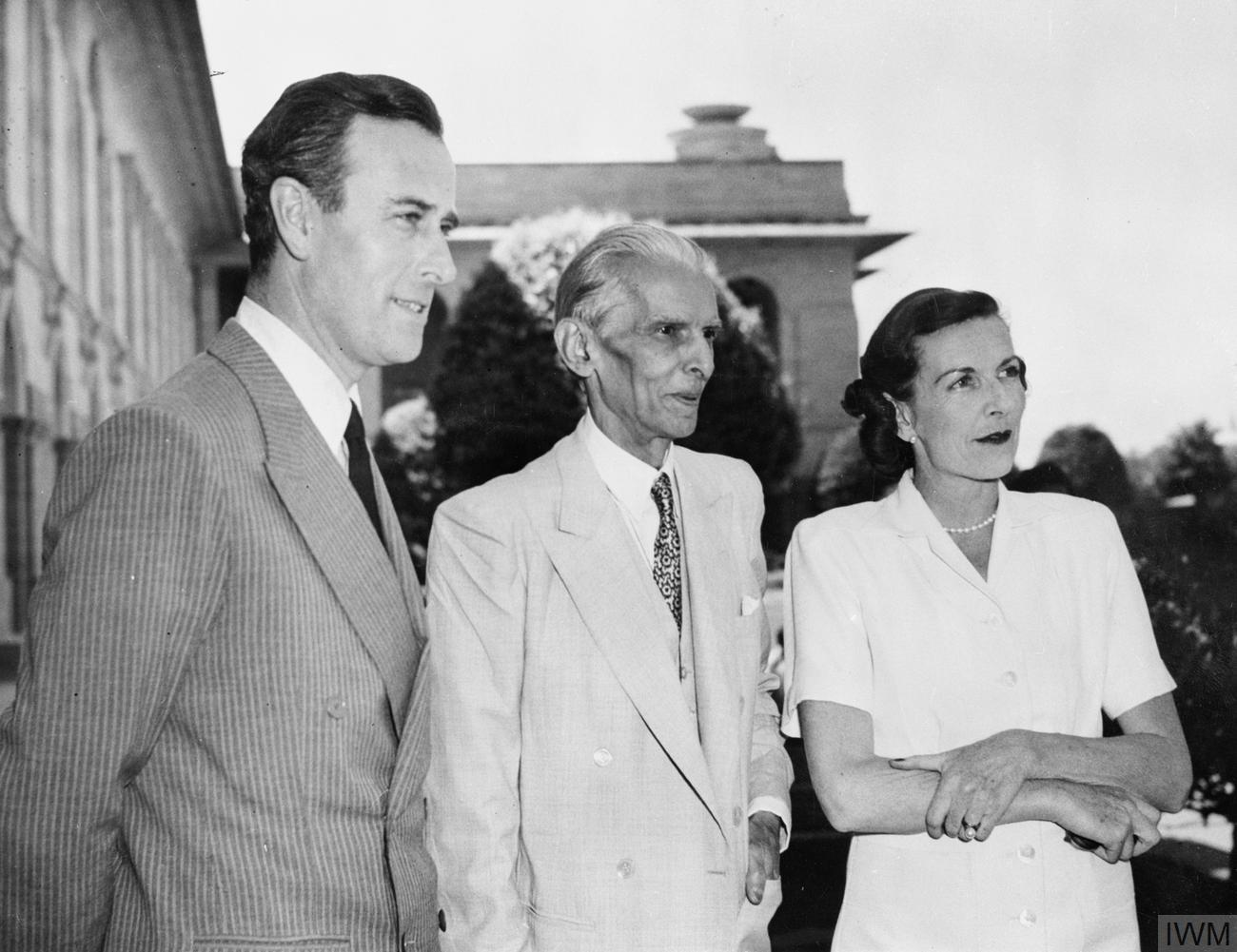
Lord and Lady Mountbatten with Muhammad Ali Jinnah.

Notwithstanding the self-promotion of his own role in Indian independence – notably in the television series The Life and Times of Admiral of the Fleet Lord Mountbatten of Burma, produced by his son-in-law Lord Brabourne, and in Freedom at Midnight by Dominique Lapierre and Larry Collins, for which he was the principal quoted source – his record is regarded as very mixed. One common view is that he hastened the process of independence unduly and recklessly, foreseeing vast disruption and loss of life and not wanting this to occur on his watch, but thereby helping to bring it about indirectly, especially in Punjab and Bengal. John Kenneth Galbraith, the Canadian-American Harvard University economist who advised Indian governments during the 1950s and, as an intimate of Nehru, served as the American ambassador from 1961 to 1963, was a particularly harsh critic of Mountbatten in this regard. Another view, however, is that the British were forced to expedite partition to avoid involvement in a potential civil war, with law and order already breaking down and Britain possessing limited resources after the Second World War. According to historian Lawrence James, Mountbatten had no option but to cut and run, the alternative being British involvement in a civil war with no viable exit.

The creation of Pakistan was never emotionally accepted by many British leaders, Mountbatten among them. He made clear his lack of support for, and faith in, the Muslim League's idea of Pakistan. Jinnah refused Mountbatten's offer to serve as Governor-General of Pakistan. When Mountbatten was asked by Collins and Lapierre whether he would have sabotaged the creation of Pakistan had he known that Jinnah was dying of tuberculosis, he replied, "Most probably".

=== Governor-General of India ===
Mountbatten became the first Governor-General of independent India on 15 August 1947 at the request of Indian Prime Minister Jawaharlal Nehru. Life magazine noted of his reception in India that, "The people gathered in the streets to cheer Mountbatten as no European had ever been cheered before."

During his tenure as governor-general, which lasted until 21 June 1948, Mountbatten played a significant role in the political integration of India and persuaded many princely states to join the new dominion. On his advice, India took the issue of Kashmir to the newly formed United Nations in January 1948. Accounts differ on the future Mountbatten desired for Kashmir. Pakistani sources suggest that he favoured the accession of Kashmir to India, citing his close relationship with Nehru, while Mountbatten's own account states that he simply wanted Maharaja Hari Singh to make a decision. He made several attempts to mediate between the Congress leaders, Muhammad Ali Jinnah, and Hari Singh on issues relating to accession of Kashmir, though he was largely unsuccessful in resolving the conflict. After the tribal invasion of Kashmir, it was on his suggestion that India secured the state's accession from Hari Singh before sending in military forces for its defence.

After his tenure concluded, Mountbatten continued to enjoy close relations with Nehru and the post-Independence Indian leadership, and he was welcomed as a former governor-general on subsequent visits, including during an official trip in March 1956. The Pakistani government, by contrast, held a negative view of Mountbatten for what it perceived as his hostile attitude towards Pakistan and deemed him persona non grata, barring him from transiting its airspace during the same visit.

== Later career ==
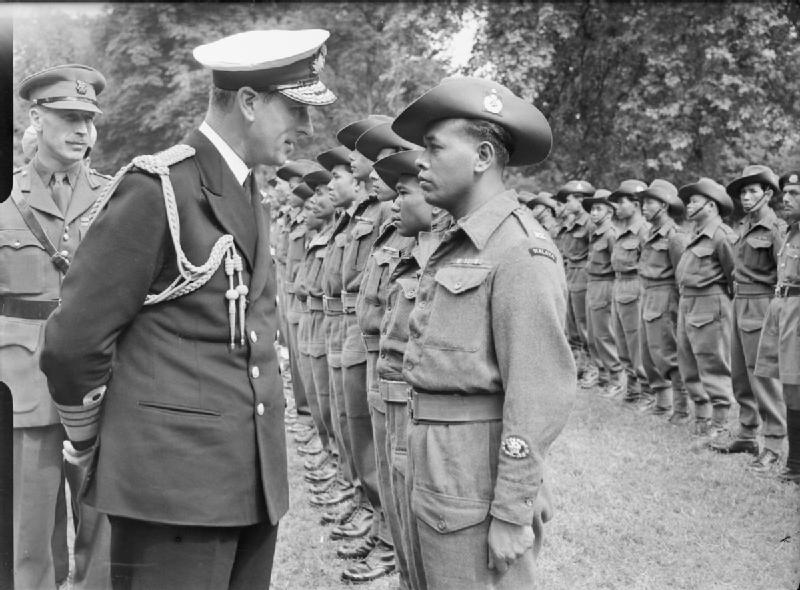
Mountbatten inspects Malayan troops in Kensington Gardens in 1946.

After leaving India, Mountbatten served as commander of the 1st Cruiser Squadron in the Mediterranean Fleet and, having been granted the substantive rank of vice-admiral on 22 June 1949, became Second-in-Command of the Mediterranean Fleet in April 1950. He was appointed Fourth Sea Lord at the Admiralty in June 1950, before returning to the Mediterranean to serve as Commander-in-Chief, Mediterranean Fleet, and NATO Commander, Allied Forces Mediterranean, from June 1952. He was promoted to the substantive rank of full admiral on 27 February 1953, and in March 1953 was appointed Personal aide-de-camp to the Queen.

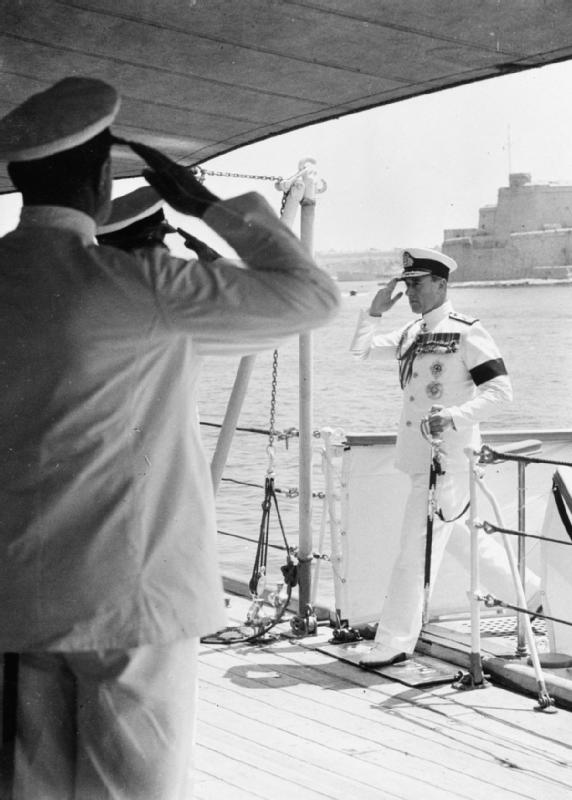
Mountbatten arrives on board HMS Glasgow at Malta to assume command of the Mediterranean Fleet, 16 May 1952

Mountbatten served his final posting at the Admiralty as First Sea Lord and Chief of the Naval Staff from April 1955 to July 1959, a position his father had held some forty years earlier. This was the first time in Royal Naval history that a father and son had both attained such high office. He was promoted to Admiral of the Fleet on 22 October 1956.

During the Suez Crisis of 1956, Mountbatten strongly advised Prime Minister Anthony Eden, an old friend, against the Conservative government's plan to seize the Suez Canal in conjunction with France and Israel. He argued that such a move would destabilise the Middle East, undermine the authority of the United Nations, divide the Commonwealth, and diminish Britain's global standing. His advice was not taken. Eden insisted that Mountbatten should not resign, and Mountbatten instead worked hard to prepare the Royal Navy for war with characteristic professionalism and thoroughness.

Despite his military rank, Mountbatten was initially ignorant of the physics involved in a nuclear explosion and had to be reassured that the fission reactions from the Bikini Atoll tests would not spread through the oceans and destroy the planet. As he became more familiar with this new form of weaponry, he grew increasingly opposed to its use in combat, while at the same time recognising the potential value of nuclear energy, particularly for submarine propulsion. He later expressed his views on the use of nuclear weapons in his article "A Military Commander Surveys The Nuclear Arms Race", published shortly after his death in International Security in the Winter of 1979–1980.

After leaving the Admiralty, Mountbatten became Chief of the Defence Staff. He served in this post for six years, during which he oversaw the consolidation of the three service departments into a single Ministry of Defence. Ian Jacob, co-author of the 1963 Report on the Central Organisation of Defence that underpinned these reforms, described Mountbatten as "universally mistrusted in spite of his great qualities". Following the election of the Wilson ministry in October 1964, the government had to decide whether to renew his appointment the following July. The Defence Secretary, Denis Healey, interviewed the forty most senior officials in the Ministry of Defence; only one, Sir Kenneth Strong, a personal friend of Mountbatten, recommended his reappointment. Healey later recalled, "When I told Dickie of my decision not to reappoint him, he slapped his thigh and roared with delight; but his eyes told a different story."

Mountbatten was appointed Colonel of The Life Guards and Gold Stick in Waiting on 29 January 1965, and Life Colonel Commandant of the Royal Marines later that year. He served as Governor of the Isle of Wight from 20 July 1965, and became the island's first Lord Lieutenant on 1 April 1974.

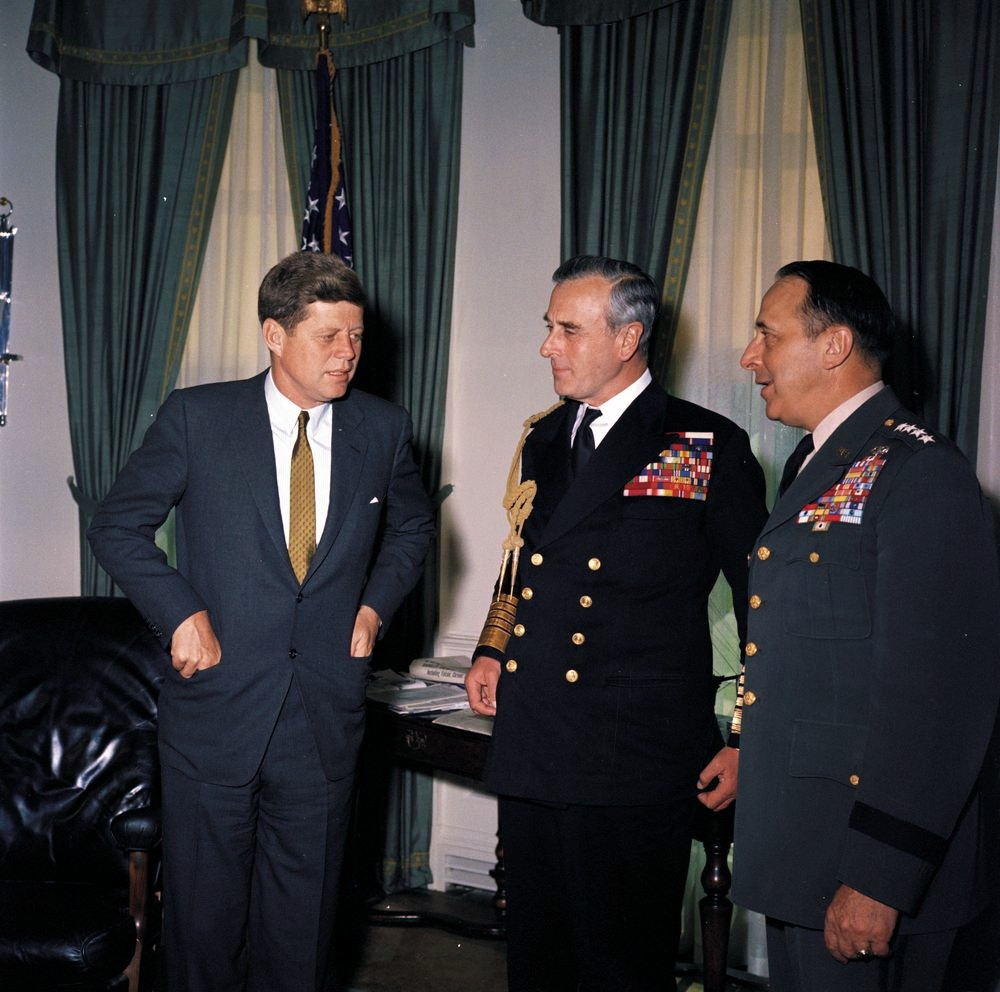
Mountbatten with John F. Kennedy in the Oval Office, Washington, D.C., 11 April 1961

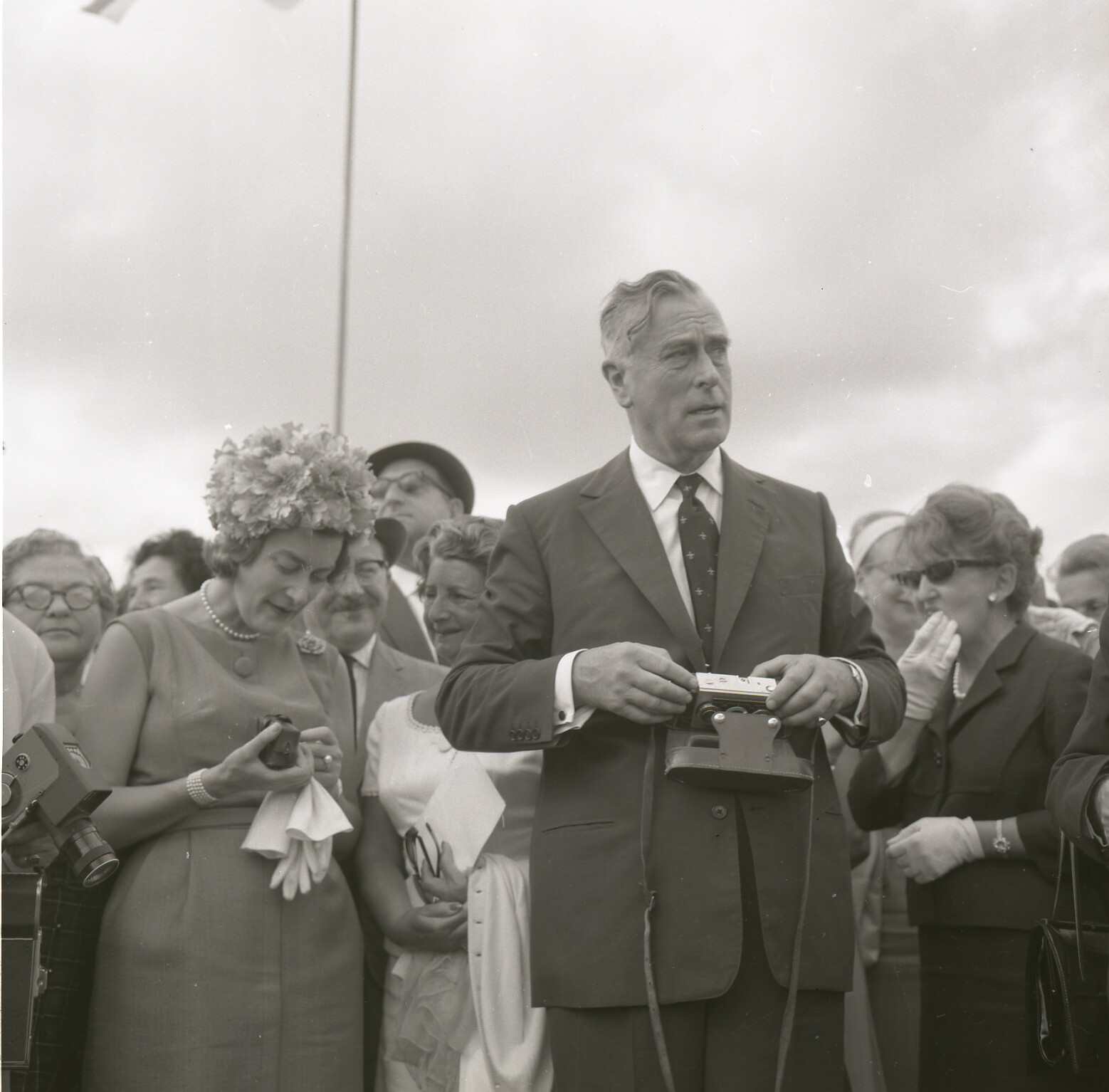
Louis Mountbatten during a 1967 visit to Israel

Mountbatten was elected a Fellow of the Royal Society and received an honorary doctorate from Heriot-Watt University in 1968.

In 1969, he tried unsuccessfully to persuade his second cousin, the Spanish pretender Infante Juan, Count of Barcelona, to ease the eventual accession of his son, Juan Carlos, to the Spanish throne by signing a declaration of abdication while in exile. The following year, Mountbatten attended an official White House dinner, during which he held a 20-minute conversation with Richard Nixon and Secretary of State William P. Rogers. He later wrote, "I was able to talk to the President a bit about both Tino [Constantine II of Greece] and Juanito [Juan Carlos of Spain] to try and put over their respective points of view about Greece and Spain, and how I felt the US could help them." In January 1971, Nixon hosted Juan Carlos and his wife, Sofia (sister of the exiled King Constantine), during a visit to Washington, and later that year The Washington Post published an article alleging that the Nixon administration was seeking to persuade Franco to retire in favour of the young Bourbon prince.

From 1967 until 1978, Mountbatten served as president of the United World Colleges Organisation, then represented by a single institution: Atlantic College in South Wales. He supported the movement enthusiastically and encouraged heads of state, politicians, and public figures around the world to share his interest. Under his presidency and personal involvement, the United World College of South East Asia was established in Singapore in 1971, followed by the United World College of the Pacific in Victoria, British Columbia, in 1974. In 1978, he passed the presidency to his great-nephew, Charles, Prince of Wales.

Mountbatten also helped to launch the International Baccalaureate; in 1971 he presented the first IB diplomas in the Greek Theatre of the International School of Geneva, Switzerland.

In 1975, Mountbatten finally visited the Soviet Union, leading the United Kingdom's delegation as the personal representative of Queen Elizabeth II at the celebrations marking the 30th anniversary of Victory Day in the Second World War in Moscow.

== Alleged plots against Harold Wilson ==
Peter Wright, in his 1987 book Spycatcher, claimed that in May 1968 Mountbatten attended a private meeting with press baron Cecil King and the government's Chief Scientific Adviser, Solly Zuckerman. Wright alleged that "up to thirty" MI5 officers had joined a secret campaign to undermine the crisis-stricken Labour government of Harold Wilson and that King was an MI5 agent. At the meeting, King allegedly urged Mountbatten to lead a government of national salvation. Zuckerman pointed out that such an idea amounted to "rank treachery" and it came to nothing owing to Mountbatten's reluctance to act. In contrast, Andrew Lownie has suggested that it took the intervention of the Queen to dissuade Mountbatten from plotting against Wilson.

In 2006, the BBC documentary The Plot Against Harold Wilson alleged that there had been another plot involving Mountbatten to oust Wilson during his second term in office (1974–1976). The period was characterised by high inflation, rising unemployment, and widespread industrial unrest. The alleged plot centred on right-wing former military figures who were supposedly building private armies to counter what they perceived as threats from trade unions and the Soviet Union. They believed that the Labour government was unable or unwilling to address these developments and that Wilson was either a Soviet agent or, at the very least, a communist sympathiser – claims Wilson strongly denied. The documentary makers alleged that a coup was planned to overthrow Wilson and replace him with Mountbatten, using these private armies and sympathisers within the military and MI5.

The first official history of MI5, The Defence of the Realm (2009), implied that there had indeed been a plot against Wilson and that MI5 maintained a file on Mountbatten. However, it also made clear that any such activity was entirely unofficial and centred on a small group of discontented officers. This had already been confirmed by former cabinet secretary Lord Hunt, who concluded in a secret inquiry in 1996 that "there is absolutely no doubt at all that a few, a very few, malcontents in MI5 ... a lot of them like Peter Wright who were right-wing, malicious and had serious personal grudges – gave vent to these and spread damaging malicious stories about that Labour government."

== Personal life ==
=== Marriage and sexual relationships ===
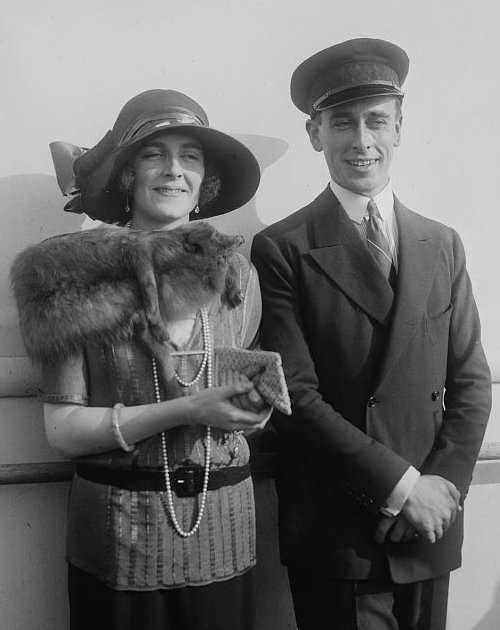
Louis and Edwina Mountbatten

Mountbatten was married on 18 July 1922 to Edwina Cynthia Annette Ashley, daughter of Wilfred William Ashley, later 1st Baron Mount Temple, himself a grandson of Anthony Ashley-Cooper, 7th Earl of Shaftesbury. She was the favourite granddaughter of the Edwardian magnate Sir Ernest Cassel and the principal heir to his fortune. The couple spent heavily on households, luxuries, and entertainment. Their honeymoon included a tour of European royal courts and North America, with a visit to Niagara Falls (because "all honeymooners went there"). During their stay in California, the newlyweds appeared in a silent home movie by Charlie Chaplin, called Nice And Friendly, which was not shown in cinemas.

Mountbatten later admitted: "Edwina and I spent all our married lives getting into other people's beds." He maintained an affair for several years with Yola Letellier, the wife of Henri Letellier, publisher of Le Journal and mayor of Deauville (1925–1928). Yola Letellier's life story was the inspiration for Colette's novel Gigi.

After Edwina's death in 1960, Mountbatten was involved in relationships with young women, according to his daughter Patricia, his secretary John Barratt, his valet Bill Evans, and William Stadiem, an employee of Madame Claude. He also had a long-running affair with American actress Shirley MacLaine, whom he met in the 1960s.

In 2019, Ron Perks, Mountbatten's driver in Malta in 1948, alleged that Mountbatten had visited the Red House, an upmarket gay brothel in Rabat used by naval officers. Andrew Lownie, a fellow of the Royal Historical Society, wrote that the United States Federal Bureau of Investigation (FBI) maintained files concerning Mountbatten's alleged homosexuality. Lownie also interviewed several young men who claimed to have been in a relationship with Mountbatten. John Barratt, Mountbatten's personal and private secretary for twenty years, stated that Mountbatten was not homosexual and that it would have been impossible for such a fact to have been concealed from him.

=== Wealth ===
Due to Edwina's considerable inheritance, the couple were extremely wealthy during their married life. Following the death of her maternal grandfather, Sir Ernest Cassel, in 1921, Edwina received a life-interest trust fund comprising 25/64 of Cassel's residuary estate. Cassel's gross estate had been valued at approximately £7,330,000, from which £2,900,000 in death duties were paid. After taxes and other expenses, the net value of the trust fund Edwina received from her grandfather's will was approximately £1,600,000.

In contrast to his new wife's extreme wealth, Mountbatten's salary as a Royal Navy lieutenant was £310 a year (equivalent to £17,200 in 2024), which was doubled by his private income. Edwina later inherited the country seat of Broadlands, Hampshire, from her father, Lord Mount Temple.

Mountbatten would later confide to his elder daughter that he and Edwina sometimes struggled to spend their £60,000 post-tax annual income during the early years of their marriage. The couple's combined before tax income during the 1930s was an estimated £113,000; however, increases in income tax rates during the 1920s and 1930s reduced their post-tax income closer to £40,000 in the years before the Second World War.

Upon Mountbatten's appointment as Supreme Allied Commander in South East Asia during the later stages of the war, his salary was £6,000, upon which he paid £2,400 in Indian income tax. He was also granted a £1,500 entertainment allowance, bringing his net employment income to £5,100.

By the end of the Second World War, the highest rate of income tax in Great Britain had risen to 19s 6d in the pound (97.5%), reducing the post-tax income they enjoyed from Edwina's fund to £4,500. The Mountbattens sought a Private members' bills in the Parliament of the United Kingdom, and, in 1949, the "Mountbatten Estate Bill" was introduced to amend the terms of Edwina's trust fund by removing the restrictions her grandfather's will placed on her borrowing against the capital assets or anticipating future income. The justification for the bill was that Lord and Lady Mountbatten undertook an exceptionally large number of public duties, which they argued placed a significant drain on their private wealth. In an address to the House of Lords committee, Edwina's representative, Sir Walter Monckton KC, noted that she had enjoyed a post-tax income of about £40,000 prior to the war.

Following Edwina's death in 1960, her gross personal estate was valued at £589,655, with a net value of £478,618. Death duties of £333,153 were levied on her personal estate; Mountbatten reportedly complained to friends that his net inheritance from his wife's estate amounted to about one shilling on the pound (5%).

Following his own death in 1979, Mountbatten's estate was valued for probate purposes at £2,196,494 (equivalent to £11,000,000 in 2025).

=== Daughter as heir ===
Lord and Lady Mountbatten had two daughters: Patricia Knatchbull (14 February 1924 – 13 June 2017), who served at times as lady-in-waiting to Queen Elizabeth II, and Lady Pamela Hicks (19 April 1929 – 5 June 2026), who accompanied her parents to India in 1947–1948 and also served as a lady-in-waiting to the Queen.

As Mountbatten had no sons when he was created Viscount Mountbatten of Burma, of Romsey in the County of Southampton, on 27 August 1946, and subsequently Earl Mountbatten of Burma and Baron Romsey, in the County of Southampton, on 18 October 1947, the Letters Patent were drafted so that, in the event he left no sons or male-line issue, the titles could pass to his daughters in order of seniority.

=== Leisure interests ===
Mountbatten was passionate about genealogy, an interest he shared with other European royalty and nobility; according to Ziegler, he spent a great deal of his leisure time studying his links with European royal houses. From 1957 until his death, he served as Patron of the Cambridge University Heraldic and Genealogical Society. He was equally enthusiastic about orders, decorations, and military ranks and uniforms, though he regarded this interest as a sign of vanity and tried, with limited success, to distance himself from it. Throughout his career, Mountbatten consistently sought to secure as many orders and decorations as possible. Particular about details of dress, he took an interest in fashion design, introducing trouser zips, a tail-coat with broad, high lapels, and a "buttonless waistcoat" that could be pulled on over the head. In 1949, having relinquished the office of Governor-General of India but retaining a keen interest in Indian affairs, he designed new flags, insignia, and details of uniforms for the Indian Armed Forces ahead of the transition from British dominion to republic; many of his designs were implemented and remain in use.

Like many members of the royal family, Mountbatten was an aficionado of polo. He introduced the sport to the Royal Navy in the 1920s and wrote a book on the subject. He received US patent 1,993,334 in 1931 for a polo stick. He also served as Commodore of Emsworth Sailing Club in Hampshire from 1931, and was a long-serving Patron of the Society for Nautical Research (1951–1979). Apart from official documents, he was not much of a reader, though he enjoyed the works of P. G. Wodehouse. He also liked the cinema; his favourite stars included Fred Astaire, Rita Hayworth, Grace Kelly, and Shirley MacLaine. In general, however, he had a limited interest in the arts.

=== Mentorship of King Charles III ===
Mountbatten was a strong influence in the upbringing of his great-nephew, the future King Charles III, and later acted as a mentor. "Honorary Grandfather" and "Honorary Grandson", they fondly called each other according to Jonathan Dimbleby's biography of the then-Prince, though both the Ziegler biography of Mountbatten and Dimbleby's account suggest that the results of this mentorship were mixed. From time to time, he strongly upbraided the Prince for showing tendencies towards the idle, pleasure-seeking dilettantism of his predecessor as Prince of Wales, King Edward VIII, whom Mountbatten had known well in their youth. Yet he also encouraged Charles to enjoy the bachelor life while he could, and then to marry a young and inexperienced girl so as to ensure a stable married life.

His qualification for offering advice to this particular heir to the throne was unique. It was Mountbatten who had arranged the visit of King George VI and Queen Elizabeth to Dartmouth Royal Naval College on 22 July 1939, taking care to include the young Princesses Elizabeth and Margaret in the invitation, and assigning his nephew, Cadet Prince Philip of Greece, to keep them amused while their parents toured the facility. This was the first recorded meeting of Charles's future parents. A few months later, however, his efforts nearly came to naught when he received a letter from his sister Alice in Athens informing him that Philip was visiting her and had agreed to repatriate permanently to Greece. Within days, Philip received a command from his cousin and sovereign, King George II of Greece, to resume his naval career in Britain which, though given without explanation, the young prince obeyed.

In 1974, Mountbatten began corresponding with Charles about a potential marriage to his granddaughter, Amanda Knatchbull, who was also Charles's second cousin. Around this time, he also recommended that the 25-year-old prince get on with "sowing some wild oats". Charles dutifully wrote to Amanda's mother (who was also his godmother and his father's first cousin), Lady Brabourne, expressing his interest. Her reply was supportive but advised that she thought her daughter still rather young to be courted.

In February 1975, Charles visited New Delhi to play polo and was shown around Rashtrapati Bhavan, the former Viceroy's House, by Mountbatten.

Four years later, Mountbatten secured an invitation for himself and Amanda to accompany Charles on his planned 1980 tour of India. Their fathers promptly objected. Prince Philip believed that the Indian public's reception would more likely reflect their response to the uncle than to the nephew. Lord Brabourne counselled that the intense scrutiny of the press would be more likely to drive Mountbatten's godson and granddaughter apart than together.

Charles was rescheduled to tour India alone, but Mountbatten did not live to the planned date of departure. When Charles finally proposed marriage to Amanda later in 1979, the circumstances had changed and she refused him.

== Allegations of child sexual abuse ==
In 2019, files were opened showing that the FBI had been aware in the 1940s of allegations that Mountbatten was homosexual and a paedophile. The FBI file on Mountbatten, begun after he became Supreme Allied Commander in Southeast Asia in 1944, described Mountbatten and his wife Edwina as "persons of extremely low morals", and included a claim by American author Elizabeth, Baroness Decies, that Mountbatten was known to be a homosexual and had "a perversion for young boys". Norman Nield, Mountbatten's driver from 1942 to 1943, told the tabloid New Zealand Truth that he had transported young boys aged eight to twelve who had been procured for Mountbatten to his official residence, and that he had been paid to keep quiet. Robin Bryans also claimed, in the Irish magazine Now, that Mountbatten and Anthony Blunt, among others, were part of a ring that engaged in homosexual orgies and procured boys in their first year at public schools such as Portora Royal School in Enniskillen. Former residents of the Kincora Boys' Home in Belfast have asserted that they were trafficked to Mountbatten at Classiebawn Castle, his residence in Mullaghmore, County Sligo. These claims were dismissed by the Northern Ireland Historical Institutional Abuse Inquiry (HIA). The HIA stated that the article making the original allegations "did not give any basis for the assertions that any of these people [Mountbatten and others] were connected with Kincora".

In October 2022, Arthur Smyth, a former resident of Kincora, waived his anonymity to make allegations of child abuse against Mountbatten. The allegations form part of a civil case against state authorities responsible for the care of children in Kincora. Smyth claims that he was raped twice by Mountbatten in encounters facilitated by the house father of Kincora. In 2025, journalist Chris Moore published a book, Kincora: Britain's Shame, in which he detailed allegations by five men that Mountbatten had raped them when they were children in Kincora.

== Television appearances ==
Instead of writing a memoir, Mountbatten presented a television series. Produced by Thames Television for ITV in 1969, the 12-episode documentary The Life and Times of Lord Mountbatten retraced his life and the major historical events of the century.

On 27 April 1977, shortly before his 77th birthday, he became the first member of the royal family to appear on the TV guest show This Is Your Life. In the UK, 22.22 million viewers tuned in to watch the programme.

== Assassination ==
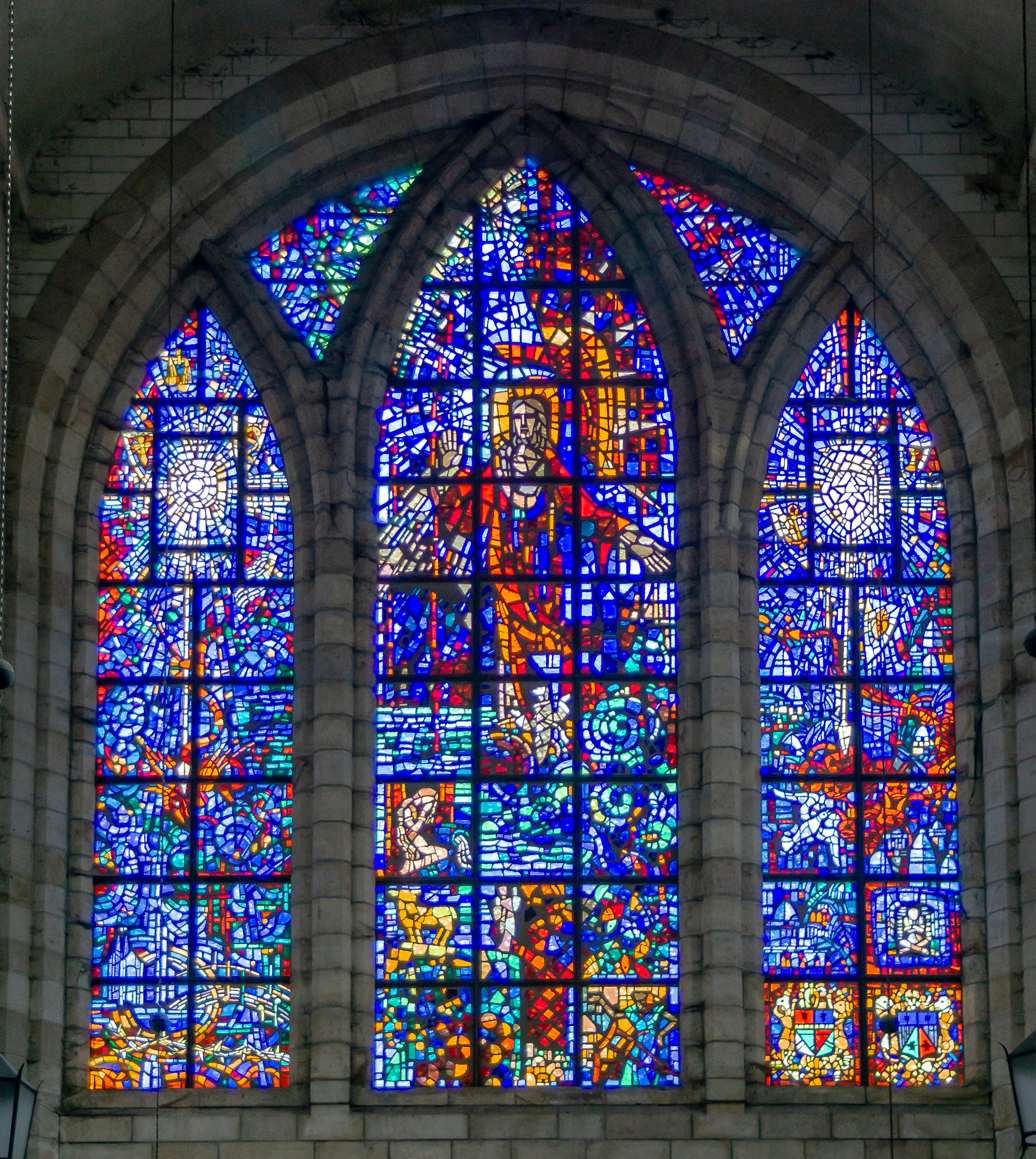
Christ in Triumph over Darkness and Evil by Gabriel Loire (1982) at St. George's Cathedral, Cape Town, South Africa, in memory of Mountbatten

Mountbatten usually holidayed at his summer home, Classiebawn Castle, on the Mullaghmore Peninsula in County Sligo, in the north-west of Ireland. The village lay only 12 miles (19 km) from the border with County Fermanagh in Northern Ireland and near an area known to be used as a cross-border refuge by IRA members. In 1978, the IRA had allegedly attempted to shoot Mountbatten as he was aboard his boat, but poor weather had prevented the sniper from taking his shot.

On 27 August 1979, Mountbatten went lobster-potting and tuna fishing in his 30-foot (9-metre) wooden boat, Shadow V, which had been moored in the harbour at Mullaghmore. IRA member Thomas McMahon had slipped onto the unguarded vessel the previous night and attached a radio-controlled bomb weighing 50 pounds (23 kg). When the party had taken the boat only a few hundred yards from the shore, the device was detonated. The boat was destroyed by the force of the blast and Mountbatten's legs were all but severed. Then aged 79, he was pulled alive from the water by nearby fishermen, but died from his injuries before reaching the shore.

Also aboard were his elder daughter Patricia, Lady Brabourne; her husband Lord Brabourne; their twin sons Nicholas and Timothy Knatchbull; Lord Brabourne's mother Doreen, Dowager Lady Brabourne; and Paul Maxwell, a young crew member from Enniskillen in County Fermanagh. Nicholas (aged 14) and Paul (aged 15) were killed in the explosion, and the others were seriously injured. Doreen, Dowager Lady Brabourne (aged 83), died from her injuries the following day.

The attack prompted outrage and condemnation around the world. Queen Elizabeth II received messages of condolence from leaders including US President Jimmy Carter and Pope John Paul II. Carter expressed his "profound sadness" at the death. Many in the Irish-American community were appalled by the attack, particularly as many American soldiers had served under Mountbatten during the Second World War. Jim Rooney, son of Pittsburgh Steelers president Dan M. Rooney (who co-founded The Ireland Funds in 1976), recalled that:

Mountbatten's murder shocked many Irish-Americans, my parents included, because they remembered him for the role he played in defeating the Axis. "It was quite sad because being in America, you were familiar with Lord Mountbatten because of World War II," my mother recalled. "It was a very sad time." But my father didn't give in to despair. "That didn't slow down [my father] one bit. It more or less gave him more energy," my mother said.

Prime Minister Margaret Thatcher said:

His death leaves a gap that can never be filled. The British people give thanks for his life and grieve at his passing.

George Colley, the Tánaiste (Deputy head of the Government of Ireland), said:

No effort will be spared to bring those responsible to justice. It is understood that subversives have claimed responsibility for the explosion. Assuming that police investigations substantiate the claim, I know that the Irish people will join me in condemning this heartless and terrible outrage.

The IRA issued a statement afterward, saying:

The IRA claim responsibility for the execution of Lord Louis Mountbatten. This operation is one of the discriminate ways we can bring to the attention of the English people the continuing occupation of our country. ... The death of Mountbatten and the tributes paid to him will be seen in sharp contrast to the apathy of the British Government and the English people to the deaths of over three hundred British soldiers, and the deaths of Irish men, women, and children at the hands of their forces.

Six weeks later, Sinn Féin vice-president Gerry Adams said of Mountbatten's death:

The IRA gave clear reasons for the execution. I think it is unfortunate that anyone has to be killed, but the furor created by Mountbatten's death showed up the hypocritical attitude of the media establishment. As a member of the House of Lords, Mountbatten was an emotional figure in both British and Irish politics. What the IRA did to him is what Mountbatten had been doing all his life to other people; and with his war record I don't think he could have objected to dying in what was clearly a war situation. He knew the danger involved in coming to this country. In my opinion, the IRA achieved its objective: people started paying attention to what was happening in Ireland.

Indian prime minister Charan Singh remarked:

Here in India, he will be remembered as a Viceroy and a Governor General who at the time of India's Independence gave us abundantly of his wisdom and goodwill. It was in recognition of our affection for him, respect for his impartiality and regard for his concern for India's freedom that the entire nation readily accepted Lord Mountbatten as the first Governor General of Independent India. His drive and vigour helped in the difficult period after our Independence.

In India, a week of national mourning was declared following Mountbatten's death. Burma announced a three-day period of mourning.

In 2015, Adams said in an interview, "I stand over what I said then. I'm not one of those people that engages in revisionism. Thankfully the war is over."

On the day of the bombing, the IRA also ambushed and killed eighteen British soldiers at the gates of Narrow Water Castle, just outside Warrenpoint in County Down, Northern Ireland. Sixteen of the dead were from the Parachute Regiment. The attack, which became known as the Warrenpoint ambush, was the deadliest assault on the British Army during the Troubles.

=== Funeral ===
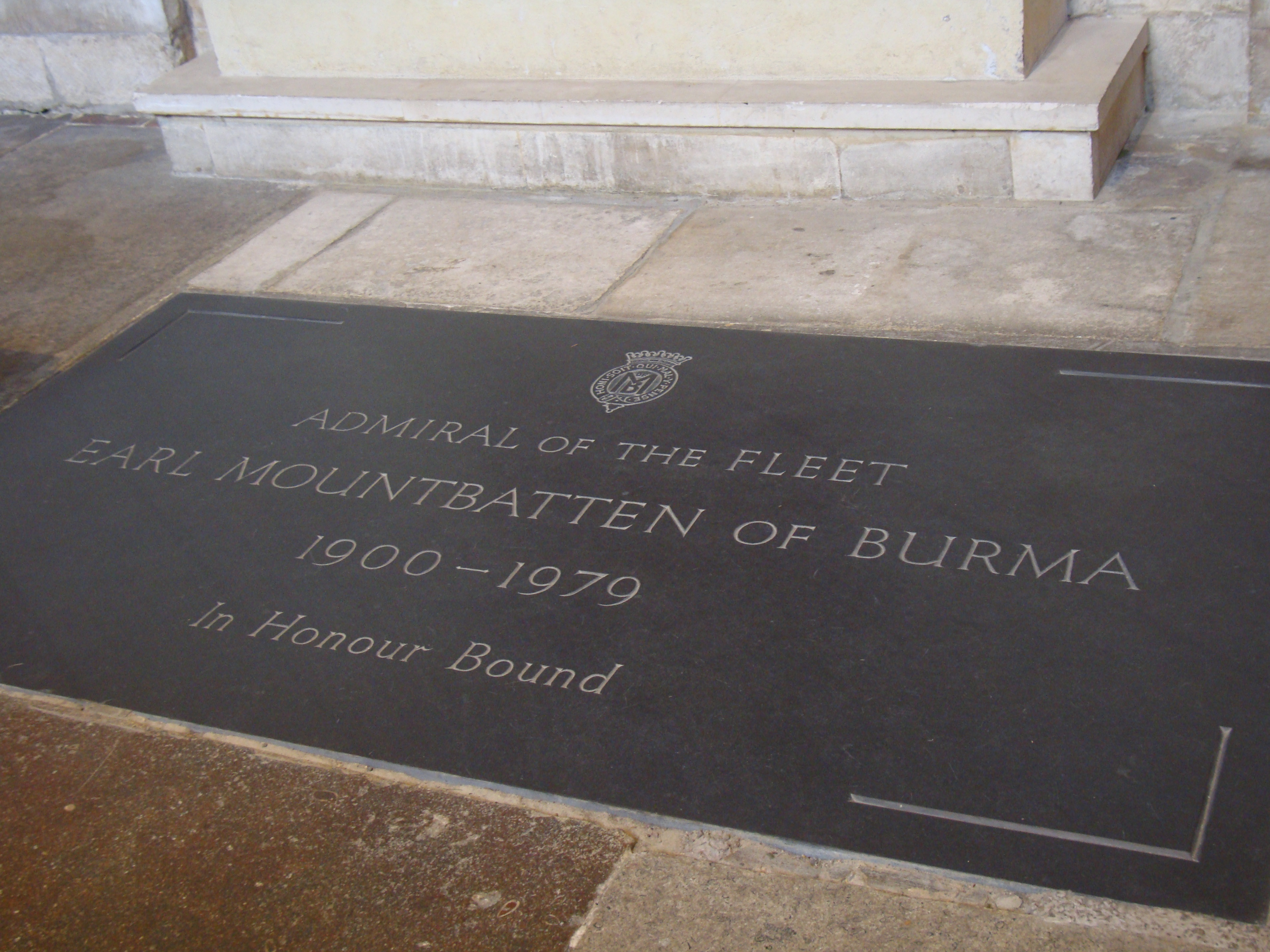
Mountbatten's tomb at Romsey Abbey in Hampshire, near to his home, Broadlands

On 5 September 1979, Mountbatten received a ceremonial funeral at Westminster Abbey, attended by Queen Elizabeth II, the royal family, and members of the European royal houses. Watched by thousands of people, the funeral procession, which began at Wellington Barracks, included representatives of all three British Armed Services and military contingents from Burma, India, the United States (represented by 70 sailors of the US Navy and 50 US Marines), France (represented by the French Navy), and Canada. His coffin was drawn on a gun carriage by 118 Royal Navy ratings. Mountbatten's funeral was the first major royal funeral to be held in the Abbey since the 18th century. During the televised service, his great-nephew Charles read the lesson from Psalm 107. In his address, the Archbishop of Canterbury, Donald Coggan, highlighted Mountbatten's various achievements and his "lifelong devotion to the Royal Navy". After the public ceremonies, which he had planned himself, he was buried in Romsey Abbey. As part of the funeral arrangements, his body had been embalmed by Desmond Henley.

=== Aftermath ===
Two hours before the bomb detonated, Thomas McMahon had been arrested at a Garda checkpoint between Longford and Granard on suspicion of driving a stolen vehicle. He was tried for the assassinations in Ireland and convicted on 23 November 1979, based on forensic evidence supplied by James O'Donovan that showed flecks of paint from the boat and traces of nitroglycerine on his clothes. He was released in 1998 under the terms of the Good Friday Agreement.

On hearing of Mountbatten's death, the then Master of the Queen's Music, Malcolm Williamson, composed the Lament in Memory of Lord Mountbatten of Burma for violin and string orchestra. The 11-minute work received its first performance on 5 May 1980 by the Scottish Baroque Ensemble, conducted by Leonard Friedman.

The Mountbatten Brailler was developed after a bequest in his will was left for the creation of a modern, low cost, portable brailler.

== Legacy ==
Mountbatten's faults, according to his biographer Philip Ziegler, like everything else about him, "were on the grandest scale. His vanity though child-like, was monstrous, his ambition unbridled ... He sought to rewrite history with cavalier indifference to the facts to magnify his own achievements." However, Ziegler concludes that Mountbatten's virtues outweighed his defects:

He was generous and loyal ... He was warm-hearted, predisposed to like everyone he met, quick-tempered but never bearing grudges ... His tolerance was extraordinary; his readiness to respect and listen to the views of others was remarkable throughout his life.

Ziegler argues that he was truly a great man, and despite being an executor of policy rather than an initiator, he came to be regarded as its creator.

What he could do with superlative aplomb was to identify the object at which he was aiming, and force it through to its conclusion. A powerful, analytic mind of crystalline clarity, a superabundance of energy, great persuasive powers, endless resilience in the face of setback or disaster rendered him the most formidable of operators. He was infinitely resourceful, quick in his reactions, always ready to cut his losses and start again ... He was an executor of policy rather than an initiator; but whatever the policy, he espoused it with such energy and enthusiasm, made it so completely his own, that it became identified with him and, in the eyes of the outside world as well as his own, his creation.

Others were less conflicted. Field Marshal Sir Gerald Templer, the former Chief of the Imperial General Staff, once told him, "You are so crooked, Dickie, that if you swallowed a nail, you would shit a corkscrew".

Mountbatten supported the burgeoning nationalist movements that grew up in the shadow of Japanese occupation. His priority was to maintain practical, stable government, but he was driven by an idealism that held that every people should be allowed to control their own destiny. Critics argued that he was too ready to overlook the faults of nationalist groups, particularly their subordination to communist influence. Ziegler writes that in Malaya, where the main resistance to the Japanese came from Chinese groups under considerable communist influence, "Mountbatten proved to have been naïve in his assessment. ... He erred, however, not because he was 'soft on Communism' ... but from an over-readiness to assume the best of those with whom he had dealings." Furthermore, Ziegler argues, he was following a practical policy based on the assumption that it would take a long and bloody struggle to drive the Japanese out, and he needed the support of all the anti-Japanese elements, most of which were either nationalists or communists.

Mountbatten took pride in enhancing intercultural understanding, and in 1984, with his elder daughter as patron, the Mountbatten Institute was established to give young adults opportunities to develop intercultural appreciation and experience by spending time abroad. The IET annually awards the Mountbatten Medal for an outstanding contribution, or contributions over a period, to the promotion of electronics or information technology and their application.

Canada's capital city of Ottawa named Mountbatten Avenue in his memory. Java Street in Kuala Lumpur, Malaysia was renamed Jalan Mountbatten after the Second World War; it was renamed again to Jalan Tun Perak in 1981. In Singapore, the Mountbatten estate, Mountbatten Single Member Constituency, and Mountbatten MRT station were also named after him.

The Lord Louis Mountbatten Memorial Loyal Orange Lodge 781 was created in his memory in 1980. It is a lodge within the Orange Order, located in Scarborough, North Yorkshire, a Protestant fraternity that holds regular meetings and takes part in Orange parades.

Mountbatten's personal papers, comprising approximately 250,000 documents and 50,000 photographs, are preserved in the University of Southampton Library.

== Awards and decorations ==
| Country | Date | Appointment | Ribbon | Post-nominal letters | Other |
|---|---|---|---|---|---|
| United Kingdom | 1911 | King George V Coronation Medal | | | |
| United Kingdom | 1918 | British War Medal | | | |
| United Kingdom | 1918 | Victory Medal | | | |
| United Kingdom | 1920 | Member of the Royal Victorian Order | | MVO | Promoted to KCVO in 1922 |
| United Kingdom | 1922 | Knight Commander of the Royal Victorian Order | | KCVO | Promoted to GCVO in 1937 |
| Kingdom of Spain | 1922 | Knight Grand Cross of the Order of Isabella the Catholic | | gcYC | |
| Kingdom of Egypt | 1922 | Grand Officer of the Order of the Nile | | | |
| Romania | 1924 | Knight Grand Cross of the Order of the Crown | | | |
| United Kingdom | 1929 | Commander of the Order of St John | | | Promoted to KStJ in 1940 |
| United Kingdom | 1935 | King George V Silver Jubilee Medal | | | |
| United Kingdom | 1937 | King George VI Coronation Medal | | | |
| United Kingdom | 1937 | Knight Grand Cross of the Royal Victorian Order | | GCVO | |
| Romania | 1937 | Knight Grand Cross of the Order of the Star of Romania | | | |
| United Kingdom | 1940 | Knight of Justice of the Order of St John | | KStJ | |
| United Kingdom | 1941 | Companion of the Distinguished Service Order | | DSO | |
| Kingdom of Greece | 1941 | War Cross | | | |
| United Kingdom | 1943 | Companion of the Order of the Bath | | CB | Promoted to KCB in 1945 |
| United States | 1943 | Chief Commander of the Legion of Merit | | | |
| United Kingdom | 1945 | Knight Commander of the Order of the Bath | | KCB | Promoted to GCB in 1955 |
| United Kingdom | 1945 | 1939–45 Star | | | |
| United Kingdom | 1945 | Atlantic Star | | | |
| United Kingdom | 1945 | Africa Star | | | |
| United Kingdom | 1945 | Burma Star | | | |
| United Kingdom | 1945 | Italy Star | | | |
| United Kingdom | 1945 | Defence Medal | | | |
| United Kingdom | 1945 | War Medal 1939–1945 | | | |
| Republic of China | 1945 | Special Grand Cordon of the Order of the Cloud and Banner | | | |
| United States | 1945 | Distinguished Service Medal | | | |
| United States | 1945 | Asiatic–Pacific Campaign Medal | | | |
| United Kingdom | 1946 | Knight Companion of the Order of the Garter | | KG | |
| Kingdom of Greece | 1946 | Knight Grand Cross of the Order of George I | | | |
| Kingdom of Thailand | 21 January 1946 | Knight Grand Cordon of the Order of the White Elephant | | PCh (KCE) | |
| Kingdom of Nepal | 10 May 1946 | Member 1st Class of the Order of the Star of Nepal | | | |
| France | 3 June 1946 | Grand Cross of the Legion of Honour | | | |
| France | 3 June 1946 | 1939–1945 War Cross | | | |
| India | 1947 | Knight Grand Commander of the Order of the Star of India | | GCSI | (Note: As Viceroy and Governor-General of India, who was the ex officio Grand Master of the order.) |
| India | 1947 | Knight Grand Commander of the Order of the Indian Empire | | GCIE | |
| India | 1948 | Indian Independence Medal | | | |
| Kingdom of the Netherlands | 1948 | Knight Grand Cross of the Order of the Netherlands Lion | | | |
| Portuguese Republic | 1951 | Grand Cross of the Order of Aviz | | GCA | |
| United Kingdom | 1952 | Queen Elizabeth II Coronation Medal | | | |
| Kingdom of Sweden | 1952 | Knight of the Royal Order of the Seraphim | | RSerafO | |
| United Kingdom | 1955 | Knight Grand Cross of the Order of the Bath | | GCB | |
| Union of Burma | 1956 | Grand Commander of the Order of Thiri Thudhamma | | | |
| Kingdom of Denmark | 1962 | Grand Cross of the Order of the Dannebrog | | | |
| United Kingdom | 1965 | Member of the Order of Merit | | OM | Military Division |
| Ethiopian Empire | 1965 | Knight Grand Cross of the Order of the Seal of Solomon | | S.K. | |
| Maldives | 1972 | Member of the Order of the Distinguished Rule of Izzuddin | | | |
| Kingdom of Nepal | 24 February 1975 | King Birendra Coronation Medal | | | |
| United Kingdom | 1977 | Queen Elizabeth II Silver Jubilee Medal | | | |
| United Kingdom | | Naval General Service Medal | | | |

He was appointed personal aide-de-camp by Edward VIII, George VI and Elizabeth II and wore each of their royal cyphers on his epaulettes.

== Arms ==
Coat of arms of Lord Mountbatten
| Notes The arms of the Earl Mountbatten of Burma consist of: Crest Crests of Hesse modified and Battenberg. Helm Helms of Hesse modified and Battenberg. Escutcheon Within the Garter, Quarterly, 1st and 4th, Hesse with a bordure compony argent and gules; 2nd and 3rd, Battenberg; charged at the honour point with an inescutcheon of the British Royal arms with a label of three points argent, the centre point charged with a rose gules and each of the others with an ermine spot sable (Princess Alice, his grandmother). Supporters Two Lions queue fourchée and crowned all or. Motto In honour bound Orders The Order of the Garter ribbon. Honi soit qui mal y pense (Shame be to him who thinks evil of it) |

== Notes ==
Government offices
| Preceded by The Viscount Wavell | Viceroy of India; 1947 | Partition of India |
| New title | Governor General of India; 1947–1948 | Succeeded by Chakravarti Rajagopalachari |
Honorary titles
| Preceded by The Duke of Wellington | Governor of the Isle of Wight; 1965–1974 | Vacant Title next held by Lord Mottistone |
| New title | Lord Lieutenant of the Isle of Wight; 1974–1979 | Succeeded by John Nicholson |
Military offices
| Preceded by Richard Symonds-Tayler | Vice-Admiral Commanding 1st Cruiser Squadron; 1948–1950 | Succeeded by Mark Pizey |
| Preceded by Herbert Packer | Fourth Sea Lord; 1950–1952 | Succeeded by Sydney Raw |
| Preceded by John Edelsten | Commander-in-Chief Mediterranean Fleet; 1952–1954 | Succeeded by Guy Grantham |
| Preceded by Rhoderick McGrigor | First Sea Lord; 1955–1959 | Succeeded by Charles Lambe |
| Preceded by William Dickson | Chief of the Defence Staff; 1959–1965 | Succeeded by Richard Hull |
| Preceded by Rustu Erdelhun | Chairman of the NATO Military Committee; 1960–1961 | Succeeded by Lyman Lemnitzer |
Peerage of the United Kingdom
| New creation | Earl Mountbatten of Burma; 1947–1979 | Succeeded by Patricia Knatchbull as Countess |
| New creation | Viscount Mountbatten of Burma; 1946–1979 | Succeeded by Patricia Knatchbull as Countess |
