= Philip Eliot =

Philip Eliot, Elliot, or Elliott may refer to:

- Philip Eliot (priest) (1835–1917), Anglican Dean of Windsor
- Philip Eliot (bishop) (1862–1946), Bishop of Buckingham, son of the dean
- Jim Elliot (Philip James Elliot, 1927–1956), evangelical Christian missionary
- Phil Elliott (born 1960), British comic book creator
- Father Philip Elliott, fictional character in Against the Wind (1948 film)
