= Robert Shaw (Royal Navy officer) =

English Royal Navy officer

Captain Robert Shaw MBE
Personal information
- Full name: Robert John Shaw
- Born: 10 February 1900; High Wycombe, Buckinghamshire, England
- Died: 5 August 1995 (aged 95); Hindhead, Surrey, England
- Batting: Right-handed
- Role: Occasional wicket-keeper
- Relatives: Edward Shaw, Sr. (father); Edward Shaw, Jr. (brother); Brian Boobbyer (nephew)

Domestic team information
- Years: Team
- 1933: Oxfordshire
- 1931–1937: Combined Services
- 1926–1928: Royal Navy
- 1923: Buckinghamshire

Career statistics
Competition	First-class
Matches	7
Runs scored	531
Batting average	40.84
100s/50s	1/2
Top score	119
Balls bowled	12
Wickets	–
Bowling average	–
5 wickets in innings	–
10 wickets in match	–
Best bowling	–
Catches/stumpings	4/–
- Source: Cricinfo, 2 September 2011

Captain Robert John Shaw MBE (10 February 1900 – 5 August 1995) was an English Royal Navy officer and cricketer. As a cricketer, he played as a right-handed batsman who fielded occasionally as a wicket-keeper. The son of Edward Domett Shaw, the first Bishop of Buckingham, and Agnes Shaw, was born at High Wycombe, Buckinghamshire.

== Naval career ==
Shaw entered the Royal Navy in 1913, where he was educated at Royal Naval College, Osborne and Royal Naval College, Dartmouth, where he studied until the end of 1915. Shaw served in the latter stages of World War I with the Royal Navy, entering as a midshipman. Six months into his wartime service, he took part in the Battle of Jutland, as second-in-command of a gun turret on the battleship HMS Hercules. He later gained the rank of sub-lieutenant following the war. He was made a Member of the Military Division of the Most Excellent Order of the British Empire in 1919, for "valuable services in H.M.S. "Royal Sovereign," 1st Battle Squadron." From April to June 1920, Shaw studied at HMS Dryad in Portsmouth as part of his promotion to lieutenant, which he obtained on 31 August 1920. The following year he served aboard the royal yacht HMY Victoria and Albert. He served aboard a number of ships throughout the mid-twenties, and by 31 August 1928 he had risen to the rank of lieutenant commander.

From 1931 to 1933, he was posted aboard HMS Kent, and while serving on the ship he was promoted to commander. His service in the navy continued to the start of World War II, having been promoted to captain months before the start of the war in September 1939. He spent eight months from 1939 to 1940 as the commanding officer of HMS Milford. From 1940 to 1942 he served as commanding officer aboard HMS Dragon. In August 1943, he served on board HMS Warspite and was temporarily Captain of the Fleet to Commander-in-Chief of the Eastern Fleet. He was mentioned in dispatches in December 1942, having been mentioned for bravery in the face of the enemy or dangerous waters. He was again mentioned in dispatches in March 1943, relating to the Operation Torch landings by Allied Forces in North Africa. In later 1943, Shaw was the Chief Staff Officer to Flag Officer, Western Italy, based at RN Base Bizerta in Tunisia. He was later the Commanding Officer of RNAS Portland, from May 1945 to April 1947. Shaw retired from the navy on 10 July 1948, with his name being placed on the retired list of Captains.

== Cricket ==
Shaw made his first-class debut for the Royal Navy against the Army in 1926. He made four further first-class appearances for the Royal Navy, the last of which came against the Royal Air Force in 1928. In his five first-class matches for the team, he scored 331 runs at an average of 36.77, with a high score of 83. His highest score, one of two fifties for the Royal Navy, came against the Army in 1928. He made a single Minor Counties Championship appearance for Buckinghamshire against Hertfordshire in 1928.

In 1931, he made a first-class appearance for the Combined Services against the touring New Zealanders at the United Services Recreation Ground in Portsmouth. In a drawn match, he scored 49 runs in the Combined Services first-innings, while in their second-innings he scored 119 runs, before being dismissed by Ian Cromb. In 1933, Shaw played three Minor Counties Championship matches for Oxfordshire. In 1937, he made his final first-class appearance for the Combined Services against the touring New Zealanders. In this match, he was dismissed for a duck in their first-innings by Alby Roberts, while in the second-innings he scored 32 runs before being dismissed by Jack Dunning.

== Personal life ==
His younger brothers, Bernard and Edward were both killed in World War I. He also had five sisters. His nephew, Brian Boobbyer, played first-class cricket for Oxford University and rugby union for England. Shaw married Sylvia Chiesman, daughter of Sidney Chiesman and Mrs Stanley Dutton, on 20 July 1934. He died at Hindhead, Surrey, on 5 August 1995.
