= Edward Shaw (cricketer, born 1892) =

English cricketer and British Army officer (1892–1916)

Personal information
- Full name: Edward Alfred Shaw
- Born: 16 May 1892; Bishop's Stortford, Hertfordshire, England
- Died: 7 October 1916 (aged 24); Le Sars, Pas-de-Calais, France
- Batting: Right-handed
- Role: Wicket-keeper
- Relatives: Edward Shaw (father); Robert Shaw (brother); Brian Boobbyer (nephew)

Domestic team information
- Years: Team
- 1912–1914: Oxford University
- 1908–1914: Buckinghamshire

Career statistics
Competition	First-class
Matches	13
Runs scored	424
Batting average	21.20
100s/50s	–/2
Top score	57*
Balls bowled	–
Wickets	–
Bowling average	–
5 wickets in innings	–
10 wickets in match	–
Best bowling	–
Catches/stumpings	12/8
- Source: Cricinfo, 20 July 2011

Edward Alfred Shaw (16 May 1892 − 7 October 1916) was an English cricketer and British Army officer. A bespectacled man, Shaw was a right-handed batsman who fielded as a wicket-keeper. The son of Edward Domett Shaw, the first Bishop of Buckingham, and Agnes Shaw, he was born in Bishop's Stortford, Hertfordshire.

He was educated at Marlborough College in Wiltshire, where he played for the college cricket team, playing for the team for 5 years, acting as captain in the last 3 of these. Shaw had made his debut for Buckinghamshire in the Minor Counties Championship in 1908 against Wiltshire. He undertook studies at Brasenose College, Oxford, making his first-class debut for Oxford University Cricket Club against the Free Foresters. He made 12 further first-class appearances for the university, the last of which came against Cambridge University in 1914. In his 13 first-class matches, he scored 424 runs at an average of 21.20, with a high score of 57 not out. This score, one of two fifties he made, scoring 57 runs in both. Behind the stumps, he kept well to the awkward bowling of John Evans, Basil Melle and Philip Le Couteur, taking 12 catches and making 8 stumpings. He was awarded his Oxford Blue as a freshman. He also continued to play on an infrequent basis for Buckinghamshire, making 16 further Minor Counties Championship appearances, the last of which came against Dorset in 1914, a match in which he scored 117 runs in his final innings for the county.

Shaw served with during World War I with the Oxfordshire and Buckinghamshire Light Infantry of the British Army. He held the rank of lieutenant, before being promoted to the temporary rank of captain on 19 November 1915. He was killed in action near Le Sars in France during the Battle of the Somme on 7 October 1916. He is commemorated at the Thiepval Memorial.

He was survived by his brother, Robert, who played first-class cricket and later became a Captain in the Royal Navy (RN). His younger brother, Bernard, was killed in the first year of World War I. His nephew, Brian Boobbyer, played first-class cricket for Oxford University and rugby union for England.
