= Robert Hay (bishop of Buckingham) =

Robert Milton Hay (30 August 1884 – 23 October 1973) was the third Bishop of Buckingham from 1944 to 1960.

Hay was educated at Merchant Taylors' School and St John's College, Oxford, he was ordained in 1909- the year he married Esmay Foster, this wife was related to Myles Birket Foster. After a curacy at St Pancras and spells as the incumbent at Summerstown, Buckinghamshire and Taplow in the same county he was appointed Rural Dean of Oxford before his ascension to the episcopate. His first wife died in 1959 and the following year he married Agnes Shaw, the eldest daughter of the first bishop of Buckingham. That same year he retired, although he then served another ten years as an assistant bishop within the same diocese.

== Notes ==
Religious titles
Preceded by Philip Eliot	Bishop of Buckingham; 1944–1960	Succeeded by Gordon Savage
