= Yola Letellier =

French socialite (1904-1996)

- Portrait of Yola Letellier c. 1929 by Man Ray
- Born: Yvonne Henriquet; 28 June 1904
- Died: 5 June 1996 (aged 91)
- Occupation: Socialite
- Known for: Inspiration for Gigi by Colette
- Spouse: Henri Letellier
- Partner(s): István Horthy; Louis Mountbatten, 1st Earl Mountbatten of Burma

Yola Letellier (born Yvonne Henriquet (also spelled Henriquez or Henriques), 28 June 1904 – 5 June 1996) was a French socialite and the wife of a newspaper owner.

Yola is widely credited as the model for the main character in Colette's 1944 novella Gigi. As such, she became the basis of a 1949 French film in which Gigi was played by Danièle Delorme; a 1951 stage adaptation by Anita Loos, in which Colette cast the as-yet-unknown Audrey Hepburn to play Gigi; and an Academy Award-winning 1958 musical film starring Leslie Caron with a score by Alan Jay Lerner and Frederick Loewe.

In the novella, Gigi is a teenager educated to be a French courtesan, to provide companionship and intellectual stimulation as well as sex, who marries an older wealthy man. In real life, Yola married Henri Letellier, 36 years her senior, who was a wealthy investor, owner of Le Journal, a stylish Parisian newspaper, and mayor of Deauville from 1925 to 1928. Letellier's family also owned hotels and casinos in Normandy.

Yola had affairs with other men, including one with Lord Louis Mountbatten, from 1932 until his death in 1979.

== Marriage ==
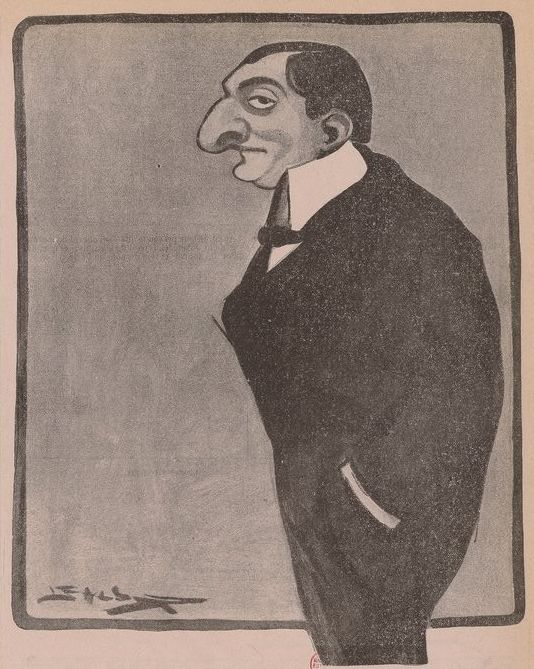
Henri Letellier before 1913

External images
- Yola Letellier, née Henriquez, at the Grand Steeple-Chase d'Auteuil, June 19, 1927
- Henri Letellier in Revue de Monats, 1932.
- Personal snapshots, Hôtel Drouot

Yola was Letellier's third wife. Colette observed the newlyweds Yola and Henri in 1926 at a hotel near Saint-Raphael, where they all were guests. After the wedding Yola was reported to have been a ballerina at the Paris Opera from an early age.

Described as an "extremely attractive, boyish-looking girl with cropped hair and a little snub nose", Yola was among those photographed by the pioneering French street fashion photographers Frères Séeberger, wearing clothes from fashion houses such as Chanel. She was also photographed by Man Ray and Edward Steichen.

The Letelliers reportedly maintained a normal family life in the French upper-class tradition, in which extra-marital affairs were accepted. When Henri died in 1960, Yola became wealthy in her own right.

== Other relationships ==
Yola simultaneously maintained three relationships: with her husband, with her "official lover" Etienne de Horthy (killed in World War II), son of Hungarian regent Miklos Horthy, and with Lord Louis Mountbatten. Mary Jayne Gold, a close friend Yola met skiing in Davos, introduced her to de Horthy.

Yola and Mountbatten met at a dance in Deauville in 1932, where they danced a Viennese waltz and the other dancers stopped to applaud them. Mountbatten claimed this was his first extra-marital affair. Yola was to be his principal mistress until his death in 1979. Mountbatten, according to one story, installed a pull-out double bed in his 1931 Rolls-Royce Phantom II to entertain Yola.

Louis Mountbatten and his wife, Edwina, maintained an unusual family relationship. Soon after Mountbatten's affair with Yola began, Edwina confronted Yola in Paris with a surprising result. "Your girl is sweet," Edwina wrote to her husband "and I like her and we got on beautifully and are now gummed and I am lunching with her at her house on Tuesday!!!" Yola became a close friend of both Mountbattens, as well as their two children. "Yola did not live with us but would visit frequently, bringing us charming gifts," according to the younger daughter, Pamela. The gifts included a French peasant dress and a short-hair dachshund. Edwina and the children even visited Yola and Henri Letellier at their home in France.
