= Philip Eliot (bishop) =

British Anglican bishop (1862–1946)

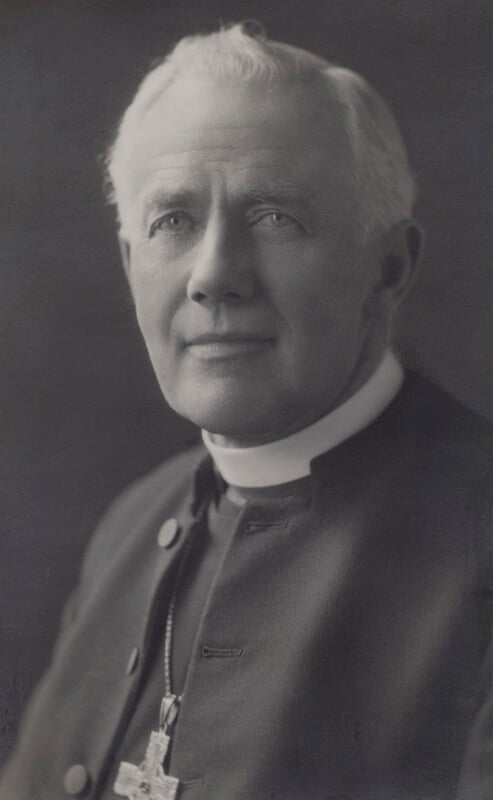
Eliot, c. 1921–1944

Philip Herbert Eliot (20 September 1862 – 1 April 1946) was a British Anglican clergyman who served as Bishop of Buckingham from 1921 to 1944.

== Birth and education ==
Eliot was born into an eminent ecclesiastical family, the son of the Very Reverend Philip Eliot, KCVO sometime Dean of Windsor, and his first wife, Mary Anna Marriott Smith. He was born at Cally House, Kirkcudbrightshire, where his father was private chaplain.

He was educated at Marlborough College and Oriel College, Oxford.

== Church career ==
Eliot was ordained by the Bishop of Winchester in 1886. After a curacy at Portsea, Portsmouth, and spells as the incumbent at Winslow and Upton-cum-Chalvey he was appointed Rural Dean of Burnham before his elevation to the episcopate. He was consecrated a bishop by Randall Davidson, Archbishop of Canterbury, on the Feast of the Conversion of St Paul 1921 (25 January) at Westminster Abbey.

He was described in his Times obituary as "A man of natural ability and sound judgement, strictly impartial in his decisions."

== Family ==
He married Ethel Myra Marshall in 1900 at Eton, and had one son, Philip Stirling Eliot (1901–1982).

== Freemasonry ==
Eliot was an active Freemason, and an officer of the United Grand Lodge of England. He became Provincial Grand Master of Freemasons in Buckinghamshire in 1929, serving in that office until 1944. His predecessor in office was Rear Admiral Sir Edward Fitzmaurice Inglefield, and his successor was Lt Col William Lawson, 5th Baron Burnham.

He took an interest in other Masonic Orders, and was exalted into the Holy Royal Arch in the prestigious Westminster and Keystone Chapter No 10 in London in December 1928.

Religious titles
| Preceded by Edward Shaw | Bishop of Buckingham; 1921–1944 | Succeeded by Robert Hay |
