= Gigi (novella) =

1944 novella by Colette

- Author: Colette
- Language: French
- Genre: Novella
- Publication date: 1944
- Publication place: France
- English publication date: 1953

Gigi (pronounced [ʒi.ʒi]) is a 1944 novella by French writer Colette. The plot concerns a young Parisian girl who is being prepared for a career as a courtesan by her grandmother. The novel also describes her relationship with Gaston, a wealthy, cultured family friend who falls in love with her and eventually marries her.

The novel was translated into English by Roger Senhouse and published (with "The Cat" translated by Antonia White) in 1953.

The life story of Yola Letellier, the wife of Henri Letellier (publisher of Le Journal and mayor of Deauville (1925–1928)), was the inspiration for the novel.

== Adaptations ==
The novella was the basis for a 1949 French film starring Danièle Delorme and Gaby Morlay.

In 1951, it was adapted for the stage by Anita Loos. Colette had personally picked the yet unknown Audrey Hepburn on first sight to play the title role. Her Aunt Alicia was played by stage legend Cathleen Nesbitt, who was to become Hepburn's acting mentor from that time on. Opening on Broadway at the Fulton Theatre on 24 November 1951, the play ran for 219 performances (finishing on 31 May 1952) and Hepburn's Broadway debut earned her a Theatre World Award.

A 1958 musical film version, starring Leslie Caron in the title role, with a screenplay by Alan Jay Lerner and a score by Lerner and Frederick Loewe, won the Academy Award for Best Picture. Lerner and Loewe adapted the film for an expurgated 1973 stage musical that proved to be unsuccessful but was revived on Broadway in 2015.
