= Philip Eliot (priest) =

English Anglican clergyman

Philip Frank Eliot KCVO (21 December 1835 – 1 November 1917) was an English Anglican clergyman who was Dean of Windsor from 1891 until 1917.

== Biography ==
Eliot was born at Weymouth, the third son of William Eliot DL and his wife, Lydia Ffolliott, sister of John Ffolliott MP of Hollybrook House, County Sligo. He was educated at Trinity College, Oxford. Eliot took a prominent part in the Oxford Union Society, serving as its President when it moved to its new premises in 1857.

Ordained in 1859, he began his ecclesiastical career with a curacy at St Michael's, Winchester. Following this he was Vicar of Holy Trinity, Bournemouth.

In 1886, he was appointed Canon of the ninth stall at St George's Chapel, Windsor Castle, a position he held until 1891 when he was made Dean of Windsor from 1891 until his death on 1 November 1917.

== Family ==
Eliot was married twice. He married firstly Mary Anna Marriott Smith (1840–1881), daughter of Rev. Francis Smith, rector of Tarrant Rushton, on 1859 at St Mary's Blandford Forum, with issue:

- Arthur Francis Eliot (1860–1864), died in childhood
- Philip Herbert Eliot (1862–1946), second Bishop of Buckingham
- Edith Mary Eliot (1865–19??)
- Alice Lydia Gertrude Eliot (1867 – 25 December 1920)
- Margaret Fanny Eliot (1868 – 11 June 1953), married Cecil Robert Fryer, brother of Frederick Fryer
- Emily Ffolliott Eliot (1871 – 12 July 1926), married Ashley Bickersteth, son of Edward Henry Bickersteth, Bishop of Exeter
- Rev. William Francis Eliot (1876 – 7 August 1922), married Katherine Rutherford Devitt, daughter of Sir Thomas Lane Devitt, 1st Baronet
- Capt John Alfred Roy Eliot (1877 – 8 May 1955), married Gladys Adelaide Beauchamp Nepean, daughter of Sir Evan Colville Nepean

After Mary Anna's death, he married Hon. Mary Emma Pitt–Rivers (1843–1900), the daughter of George Pitt-Rivers, 4th Baron Rivers, in 1883 Windsor, with issue

- Victor Alexander George Eliot (1884–1959)

Church of England titles
Preceded by Randall Davidson	Dean of Windsor; 1891 – 1917	Succeeded by Albert Victor Baillie
