= Edward Shaw (bishop) =

Bishop of Buckingham from 1914 to 1921

- Bishop of Buckingham
- Other post: Assistant Bishop of Oxford

Personal details
- Born: Edward Domett Shaw; 5 October 1860
- Died: 5 November 1937 (aged 77)
- Cricket career

Cricket information
- Batting: Right-handed
- Bowling: Right-handed fast-medium

Career statistics
| Competition | First-class |
|---|---|
| Matches | 11 |
| Runs scored | 315 |
| Batting average | 15.75 |
| 100s/50s | 0/1 |
| Top score | 78* |
| Balls bowled | 889 |
| Wickets | 19 |
| Bowling average | 18.84 |
| 5 wickets in innings | 1 |
| 10 wickets in match | 0 |
| Best bowling | 5/29 |
| Catches/stumpings | 3/– |
- Source: Cricinfo, 12 April 2023

Edward Domett Shaw (5 October 1860 – 5 November 1937) was Bishop of Buckingham from 1914 to 1921 and Assistant Bishop of Oxford until 1935.

== Biography ==
Shaw was educated at St John's School, Leatherhead, between 1871 and 1876; Forest School, Walthamstow; and Oriel College, Oxford. As a young man he played first-class cricket, both for his university and Middlesex.

In 1887 he was appointed Headmaster of Bishop's Stortford College and was ordained two years later. From 1894 until 1910 he was the vicar of High Wycombe, and in January 1902 he was also appointed Rural Dean of Wycombe. In 1910 he was appointed Archdeacon of Buckingham; in 1913 it was announced that he would be the first Bishop of Buckingham (a bishop suffragan to the Bishop of Oxford), a post he held until 1921 when his duties were redefined to undertake the roles of Archdeacon of Oxford and Assistant Bishop of Oxford (across the whole diocese) and residentiary canon of Christ Church. He retired in ill-health in September 1936; following his death in 1937 The Times commented in its obituary that

although his churchmanship was very definite his kind nature ensured he could always see the good in other people's natures.

== Family ==
Shaw married, in 1891, Agnes Gilbey, with whom he had ten children. Their son, Edward Alfred, also played first-class cricket and was killed in the First World War, as were two other sons, Bernard and Arthur. His only surviving son, Robert, played first-class cricket and became a Captain in the Royal Navy, serving in the Second World War.

Church of England titles
| New title | Bishop of Buckingham; 1914 – 1921 | Succeeded by Philip Eliot |
