= Bishop of Buckingham =

Bishop of the Church of England

The Bishop of Buckingham is an episcopal title used by a suffragan bishop of the Church of England Diocese of Oxford, in the Province of Canterbury, England. The title takes its name from the historic county town of Buckingham; the See was erected under the Suffragans Nomination Act 1888, by Order in Council dated 22 November 1913. The bishops suffragan of Buckingham have been area bishops since the Oxford area scheme was founded in 1984.

The see became vacant following the death of the former incumbent, Alan Wilson, in February 2024. On Wednesday 27 November 2024 it was announced that the next Bishop of Buckingham would be Dave Bull who was duly consecrated on 27 February 2025.

== List of bishops ==
Bishops of Buckingham
From	Until	Incumbent	Notes
1914	1921	Edward Shaw	became Assistant Bishop and Archdeacon of Oxford
1921	1944	Philip Eliot	
1944	1960	Robert Hay	
1960	1964	Gordon Savage	Translated to Southwell
1964	1974	Christopher Pepys	
1974	1994	Simon Burrows	First area bishop from 1984.
1994	1998	Colin Bennetts	Translated to Coventry
1998	2003	Mike Hill	Translated to Bristol
2003	2024	Alan Wilson	Died in post.
2025	present	Dave Bull	Consecrated 27 February 2025 at Canterbury Cathedral.
