= Alexander Burnett (politician) =

Scottish Conservative politician

Alexander Burnett of Leys MSP
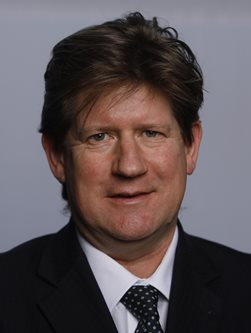
- Official portrait, 2026

Member of the Scottish Parliament for Aberdeenshire West
- Incumbent
- Assumed office 5 May 2016
- Preceded by: Dennis Robertson
- Majority: 5,784 (15.6%)

Scottish Conservative Shadow portfolios
- 2026–: Shadow Cabinet Secretary for Local Government
- 2024–2025: Chief Whip

Personal details
- Born: Alexander James Amherst Burnett; 30 July 1973 (age 53) Banchory, Scotland
- Party: Scottish Conservatives
- Spouse: Lavinia Cox
- Children: 3
- Education: Eton College
- Alma mater: Newcastle University
- Website: www.alexanderburnett.com

Alexander James Amherst Burnett of Leys (born 30 July 1973) is a Scottish Conservative politician who has served as the Member of the Scottish Parliament (MSP) for the Aberdeenshire West constituency since 2016.

== Family and background ==
Alexander Burnett is the son of James Comyn Amherst Burnett of Leys, Chief of the Name and Arms of the House of Burnett, and Fiona Mercedes Phillips. His mother Fiona is the daughter of Harold Phillips and Georgina, Lady Kennard, and a sister of the Duchesses of Abercorn and Westminster. Burnett is a fourth-great-grandson of Nicholas I of Russia on his mother's side, and is thus a fourth cousin once removed of King Charles III. Through the same line, he also claims descent from the Russian noblemen Abram Petrovich Hannibal and Alexander Pushkin. He was educated at Eton College and Newcastle University, where he graduated with an LL.B.

== Career ==
After graduating Burnett worked for a decade in Azerbaijan, before returning to Scotland where he started a number of businesses with his family, including property developer North Banchory Limited and its biomass renewable energy subsidiary Hill of Banchory ESCo Limited (HoBESCo). Burnett is also the owner of an estate in Aberdeenshire, and the beneficiary of two property-owning trusts, that have an estimated value of almost £20 million.

Burnett stood as the Conservative Party's candidate in the West Aberdeenshire and Kincardine consistency in the 2015 general election, losing the seat to the SNP's Stuart Donaldson, receiving 28.8% of the vote compared to Donaldson's 41.6%.

=== Member of the Scottish Parliament ===
In the 2016 Scottish Parliament election Burnett stood as the Conservative Party candidate for the Aberdeenshire West constituency and won the seat with 38.1% of the vote, unseating the incumbent candidate SNP candidate Dennis Robertson who received 35.5%. Burnett was re-selected by the Scottish Conservatives as the candidate for Aberdeenshire West in the 2021 Scottish Parliament election.

The Scottish Parliament's cross-party Standards Committee unanimously found that Burnett had broken the Parliament's code of conduct by submitting written questions while failing to indicate a financial interest in mid-September 2017, but did not apply any sanctions. However two weeks later the Committee again found that Burnett had broken the code of conduct in a similar way, and sanctioned the MSP by banning him from asking written questions for two weeks.

Burnett is the Conservative spokesperson for energy in the Scottish Parliament. He sits on the Environment, Climate Change and Land Reform Committee of the Scottish Parliament.

At the 2021 Scottish Parliament election Burnett was re-elected for Aberdeenshire West with an increased majority of 3,390 votes as his vote share rose by 9.1%. The Scotsman reported that the seat had been forecast to produce a close contest and his holding of it was seen as "a significant blow to the hopes of an outright SNP majority" in the Scottish Parliament as a result of the election.

In the 2025 Scottish Parliament vote S6M-18686 regarding the Scottish boycott of Israel, Burnett voted against the motion and the proposed restriction of funding to firms that provide weapons used in the breaches of humanitarian law in Gaza.

He was re-elected at the 2026 Scottish Parliament election with an increased majority of 5,784 votes. In his victory speech, he called Reform UK "the handmaidens of the SNP".

== Personal life ==
Burnett is married to Lavinia Cox, with whom he has a son and two daughters.

== Ancestry ==
Ancestors of Alexander Burnett (politician)

16. Lord William Cecil
8. William Cecil
17. Mary Tyssen-Amherst, 2nd Baroness Amherst of Hackney
4. Henry Cecil
18. Henry Baggallay
9. Gladys Baggallay
19. Elizabeth Richards
2. James Burnett
20. Sir Thomas Burnett, 12th Baronet
10. Sir James Burnett, 13th Baronet
21. Mary Cumine
5. Elizabeth Burnett
22. William Crozier Smith
11. Sybil Crozier Smith
1. Alexander Burnett
24. Joseph Edward John Phillips
12. Joseph Harold John Phillips
25. Maud Henrietta Thurnall
6. Harold Phillips
26. John Pablo Bryce
13. Mary Mercedes Bryce
27. Mercedes González de Candamo Iriarte
3. Fiona Phillips
28. Sir Julius Charles Wernher, 1st Baronet
14. Sir Harold Wernher, 3rd Baronet
29. Alice Sedgwick Mankiewicz
7. Georgina Wernher
30. Grand Duke Michael Mikhailovich of Russia
15. Countess Anastasia Mikhailovna of Torby
31. Countess Sophie of Merenberg

Scottish Parliament
Preceded by Dennis Robertson	Member of the Scottish Parliament for Aberdeenshire West; 2016–present	Incumbent
Lines of succession
Preceded by Fiona Phillips	Line of succession to the British throne descendant of Frederick, Prince of Wales, son of George II	Succeeded by Thomas Burnett
