= Harold Phillips (British Army officer) =

British Army officer (1909–1980)

Lieutenant Colonel Harold Phillips FRGS
- Born: Harold Pedro Joseph Phillips; 6 November 1909; Chelsea, London, England
- Died: 27 October 1980 (aged 70); Alford, Aberdeenshire, Scotland
- Spouse: Georgina Wernher (m. 1944)
- Military career
- Allegiance: United Kingdom
- Branch: British Army
- Rank: Lieutenant Colonel
- Nickname: "Bunnie"
- Service number: 51788
- Unit: Coldstream Guards
- Conflicts: World War II

Harold Pedro Joseph Phillips, FRGS (6 November 1909 – 27 October 1980) was a British lieutenant colonel in the Coldstream Guards.

== Early life and service ==
Phillips was born on 6 November 1909 in Chelsea, London. His father was Colonel Joseph Harold John Phillips, of Royston, Hertfordshire, his mother was Mary Mercedes Bryce, youngest daughter of John Pablo Bryce. His maternal grandmother, María de las Mercedes González de Candamo e Iriarte (1849–1929), was the sister of Manuel González de Candamo e Iriarte, President of Peru. He was a first cousin of Janet, Marchioness of Milford Haven, whose mother-in-law, Countess Nadejda Mikhailovna de Torby, was the sister of his own mother-in-law, Countess Anastasia Mikhailovna de Torby.

Phillips joined the Coldstream Guards, rising to the rank of lieutenant colonel. During World War II, he was assigned to the British Security Co-ordination in New York City, under William Stephenson, and the Allied Mission in Washington, D.C.

== Personal life ==
=== Affair with Lady Louis Mountbatten ===
Sometime in the 1930s, Phillips became involved with Edwina, Lady Louis Mountbatten. Bunnie spent a great deal of time with Edwina and befriended her two daughters, Patricia and Pamela. Lord Louis considered divorcing Edwina, but due to his personal admiration for Phillips and his own affair with Yola Letellier, did not proceed.

Edwina's sister-in-law, The Marchioness of Milford Haven, was the aunt of Bunnie's future wife, Georgina "Gina" Wernher, elder daughter of Sir Harold Wernher, 3rd Bt, and Countess Anastasia de Torby. Initially, Edwina encouraged the match. In 1943, she suggested to Gina that she should marry Bunnie. Bunnie and Gina met in Park Lane outside The Dorchester in August 1944. Edwina invited them to dinner and seated them beside each other. Bunnie and Gina eventually became engaged on the train to Lynden Manor, the Milford Havens' home in Holyport, Berkshire. Bunnie went to Broadlands to tell Edwina the news himself; despite her early encouragement of the match, she was devastated. Edwina did not attend the wedding and forbade Pamela from accepting Bunnie's invitation to be a bridesmaid. It took her about two years to get over the end of the affair.

=== Marriage and issue ===
Bunnie and Gina were married on 10 October 1944 at St Margaret's Church, Westminster. Guests included the King of the Hellenes, Prince Bertil of Sweden, and the Duchess of Kent. Princess Alexandra of Kent and Gina's sister, Myra, were bridesmaids.

Bunnie and Gina had five children:

- Alexandra Anastasia "Sacha" Phillips (27 February 1946 – 9 December 2018); married James Hamilton, 5th Duke of Abercorn, in 1966, had issue
- Nicholas Harold Phillips (23 August 1947 – 1 March 1991); married Countess Marie Lucie "Lucy" Czernin von und zu Chudenitz (born 1941) in 1975, had issue
- Fiona Mercedes Phillips (born 30 March 1951); married James Burnett of Leys (born 1941) in 1971, had issue, including Alexander Burnett of Leys
- Marita Georgina Phillips (born 28 May 1954); married, firstly, Randall Crawley (1950–1988), son of Virginia Cowles and Aidan Crawley, in 1982, had issue. Married, secondly, Andrew Knight in 2006, no issue
- Natalia Ayesha Phillips (born 8 May 1959); married Gerald Grosvenor, 6th Duke of Westminster, in 1978, had issue, including Hugh Grosvenor, 7th Duke of Westminster

The family initially settled at Thorpe Lubenham Hall, a house Gina's father had bought in 1920. Members of the royal family were frequent guests of the Phillipses. In 1966, they sold Thorpe Lubenham and moved to Checkendon Court, a Grade II listed manor house near Checkendon, South Oxfordshire. They also had a house in Aberdeenshire and a flat in London. Their son, Nicholas, inherited Luton Hoo from his maternal grandparents.

Phillips died on 27 October 1980 in Alford, Aberdeenshire at the age of 70. Gina was remarried in 1992, becoming the third wife of Sir George Kennard, 3rd Bt, whom she remained married to until his death in 1999. She died on 28 April 2011 at the age of 91.
