= Myra Butter =

British aristocrat (1925–2022)

Lady Butter CVO
- Born: Myra Alice Wernher; 18 March 1925; Edinburgh, Scotland
- Died: 29 July 2022 (aged 97); London, England
- Spouse: Sir David Butter (m. 1946; died 2010)
- Children: Sandra Elizabeth Butter; Marilyn Davina Butter, Countess of Dalhousie; Rohays Georgina Butter; Georgina Marguerite Butter; Charles Harold Butter
- Parents: Sir Harold Wernher, 3rd Bt (father); Countess Anastasia Mikhailovna de Torby (mother)

Myra, Lady Butter CVO (born Myra Alice Wernher; 18 March 1925 – 29 July 2022) was a British aristocrat and thoroughbred racehorse owner.

== Early life ==
Butter was born Myra Alice Wernher on 18 March 1925 in Edinburgh. She was the third child and younger daughter of Harold Wernher and Countess Anastasia Mikhailovna de Torby, who was known in the United Kingdom as "Lady Zia Wernher". Her father was the second son of Sir Julius Wernher, 1st Bt, a German-born randlord, and Alice Sedgwick Mankiewicz, an heiress who was of part Polish Jewish descent. Her mother was the morganatic daughter of Grand Duke Michael Mikhailovich of Russia and Countess Sophie Nikolaievna of Merenberg, a descendant of Abram Petrovich Hannibal and Alexander Pushkin. She had two older siblings; George Michael Alexander Wernher (1918–1942) and Georgina, Lady Kennard (1919–2011).

She was baptized on 4 June 1925 at Holy Trinity Church, Marylebone. Her godparents included the Crown Princess of Sweden (for whom her aunt, the Marchioness of Milford Haven, stood proxy). The family resided at Luton Hoo in Bedfordshire, Thorpe Lubenham Hall in Leicestershire, Someries House in Regent's Park and Downie Park in Angus, Scotland. Myra and her siblings were childhood friends of Princess Elizabeth and Princess Margaret, as well as Prince Philip of Greece and Denmark, whose legal guardian was their uncle, the Marquess of Milford Haven. She was a member of 1st Buckingham Palace Guide Company which was formed in 1937 for Princess Elizabeth.

The National Portrait Gallery holds several photographic portraits of the Wernher family, taken by Bassano Ltd in 1937.

During World War II, she volunteered as a nurse with the Order of Saint John at the Market Harborough and District Hospital. Her brother was killed in action while serving with the 17th/21st Lancers on the Tunisian campaign.

== Marriage and family ==
On 5 March 1946, Myra married Major David Henry Butter (son of Colonel Charles Adrian Butter), of the Scots Guards, at St Margaret's Church, Westminster. Queen Mary, Princess Elizabeth and Princess Margaret, as well as Prince Philip and his mother, Princess Andrew of Greece and Denmark, were among the guests. Princess Alexandra of Kent was a bridesmaid and Prince Michael of Kent was a pageboy.

They had five children:

- Sandra Elizabeth Zia Butter (born 26 July 1948), a goddaughter of Queen Elizabeth II, married William David Morrison in 1983
- Marilyn Davina Butter (born 22 March 1950), married James Ramsay, 17th Earl of Dalhousie in 1973
- Rohays Georgina Butter (9 April 1952 – 7 January 2023), married Prince Alexander Galitzine in 1988
- Georgina Marguerite Butter (born 9 July 1956), a goddaughter of Princess Alexandra, married Count Peter Pejačević de Veröcze in 1982
- Charles Harold Alexander Butter (born 10 April 1960), married Agnieszka Szeluk in 2006

The family lived at Cluniemore in Perthshire. The Duke of Kent and Princess Alexandra often came to stay during their courtships with Katharine Worsley and the Hon. Angus Ogilvy, respectively.

Myra and her family attended the wedding of Princess Elizabeth and Philip Mountbatten in 1947. Her daughter Sandra was a bridesmaid at the wedding of the Duke of Kent in 1961, and daughter Georgina was a bridesmaid at the wedding of Princess Alexandra in 1963.

== Later life ==
Inspired by her niece, the Duchess of Abercorn, and a visit to Saint Petersburg, in 1988, she founded the Pushkin Prize in Scotland. In 1998, she attended the reburial of the murdered Russian imperial family at Saints Peter and Paul Cathedral, Saint Petersburg.

Lady Butter often appeared in documentaries about the royal family, she also appeared on ITV's coverage of the death and funeral of Prince Philip, Duke of Edinburgh.

Butter and Queen Elizabeth II shared a love of horse racing. She owned Formulate, who won the Waterford Candelabra Stakes, May Hill Stakes and the Fillies' Mile in 1978, trained by Henry Cecil. She was co-owner of her family's Someries Stud in Newmarket, which they sold to Sheikh Mohammed bin Rashid Al Maktoum in 1990.

She was created a Commander of the Royal Victorian Order in the 1992 Birthday Honours. For her work with the Pushkin Prize, she was awarded the Medal of Pushkin in 2018. She returned the medal in March 2022 following the Russian invasion of Ukraine.

Her husband was knighted in 1991 and died in 2010 at the age of 90. She died in London on 29 July 2022 at the age of 97.
