= John Pablo Bryce =

High Sheriff of Devon (1846–1901)

John Pablo Bryce of Bystock Court, Exmouth, Devon (10 October 1846 in Callao, Peru – 3 March 1901 in Rome, Italy) was an Anglo-Peruvian guano millionaire and member of the British gentry.

== Family ==
He was the son of John Paul Bryce (1817 in Edinburgh, Scotland – 9 March 1888 in Biarritz, France), founder of the Bryce & Co. ship company and the General South American Bank, and full partner in the W. R. Grace and Company, who went to Peru between 1837 and 1862, where he married at Callao, on 11 June 1845 Gertrudis María de los Dolores de Vivero y Morales.

He was the paternal grandson of Francis Bryce and first wife Janet Weddle, and maternal grandson of José Pascual de Vivero y Salaverría, Governor of Guayaquil, and wife Lucía Morales.

== Biography ==
He held the office of Sheriff of Devon in 1896.

== Marriage and issue ==
He married in Paris in 1870/71 with María de las Mercedes González de Candamo e Iriarte, sister of Manuel González de Candamo e Iriarte, President of Peru (1903–1904). They had, at least, five sons and two daughters:

- Virginia Gertrudis Bryce (b. 1872), married to Capt. Hugh Gainford, of Ontario, Canada
- Paul John Bryce (b. circa 1873 at Paris – December 1892 at Oxford)
- Charles Alexander Bryce (b. 1875 – d. circ. before 1923), Captain of the Coldstream Guards, married Mrs Marion Evelyn Barclay née Ives (1874–1950, who remarried as her third husband in 1923 to the 2nd Baron Phillimore), daughter of Major-General Cecil Robert St John Ives and Hon. Susan Ann Talbot. They had one son:
  - John Felix Charles "Ivar" Bryce (b. 1906 – d. 1985), Lord of the manor of Moyns Park, married firstly Vera de Sà Sottomaior, of São Paulo, Brazil (remarried to Randal Plunkett, 19th Baron of Dunsany) then secondly Josephine Hartford O'Donnell, the A&P heiress and sister of Huntington Hartford. Bryce was a close friend of Ian Fleming, author of the James Bond series of spy novels
- Francis (Frank) Bryce of Hamilton, Bermuda (January/March 1876 in Bystock Terrace, St Thomas, Exeter, Devon – 2 February 1951 in Bermuda), married Gladys Jean Mosley, and had at least one daughter:
  - Janet Mercedes Bryce (b. 29 September 1937 in Bermuda), married in 1960 to David Mountbatten, 3rd Marquess of Milford Haven
- Victor Felix Peter Bryce (1878 – January 1963). He never married and had no children
- Edward Daniel Bryce (22 April 1879, Withycombe Raleigh, St. Thomas, Devonshire – May 1936), married Vera Frances Goldsmid-Stern-Salomons in 1919, and divorced in 1932. They had no children. Vera was the third daughter of Sir David Lionel Goldsmid-Stern-Salomons, 2nd Bart. and Laura Julia Stern, both from prominent Anglo-Jewish families (Laura Stern's father Hermann de Stern was one of the wealthiest men of the Victorian era with a fortune of £3.5m at his death in 1887, the equivalent of £293m today)
- Mary Mercedes Bryce (1882–1951), married to Col. Joseph Harold John Phillips, of Royston. They had two sons:
  - Lt.-Cdr. Charles Edward Harold John Phillips, married in 1951 Tanis Eva Bulkeley Guinness, of the banking line of the Guinness family
  - Lt.-Col. Harold Pedro Joseph Phillips (6 November 1909 – 27 October 1980), married in 1944 Georgina Wernher (17 October 1919 – 28 April 2011), daughter of Sir Harold Augustus Wernher, 3rd Baronet and Countess Anastasia de Torby. They had five children:
    - Alexandra Anastasia Hamilton, Duchess of Abercorn (b. 27 February 1946)
    - Nicholas Harold Phillips (23 August 1947 – 1 March 1991)
    - Fiona Mercedes Burnett of Leys (b. 30 March 1951)
    - Marita Georgina Crawley (b. 28 May 1954)
    - Natalia Ayesha Grosvenor, Duchess of Westminster (b. 8 May 1959)
