= Alexandra Hamilton, Duchess of Abercorn =

British philanthropist (1946–2018)

Her Grace The Duchess of Abercorn OBE OStJ
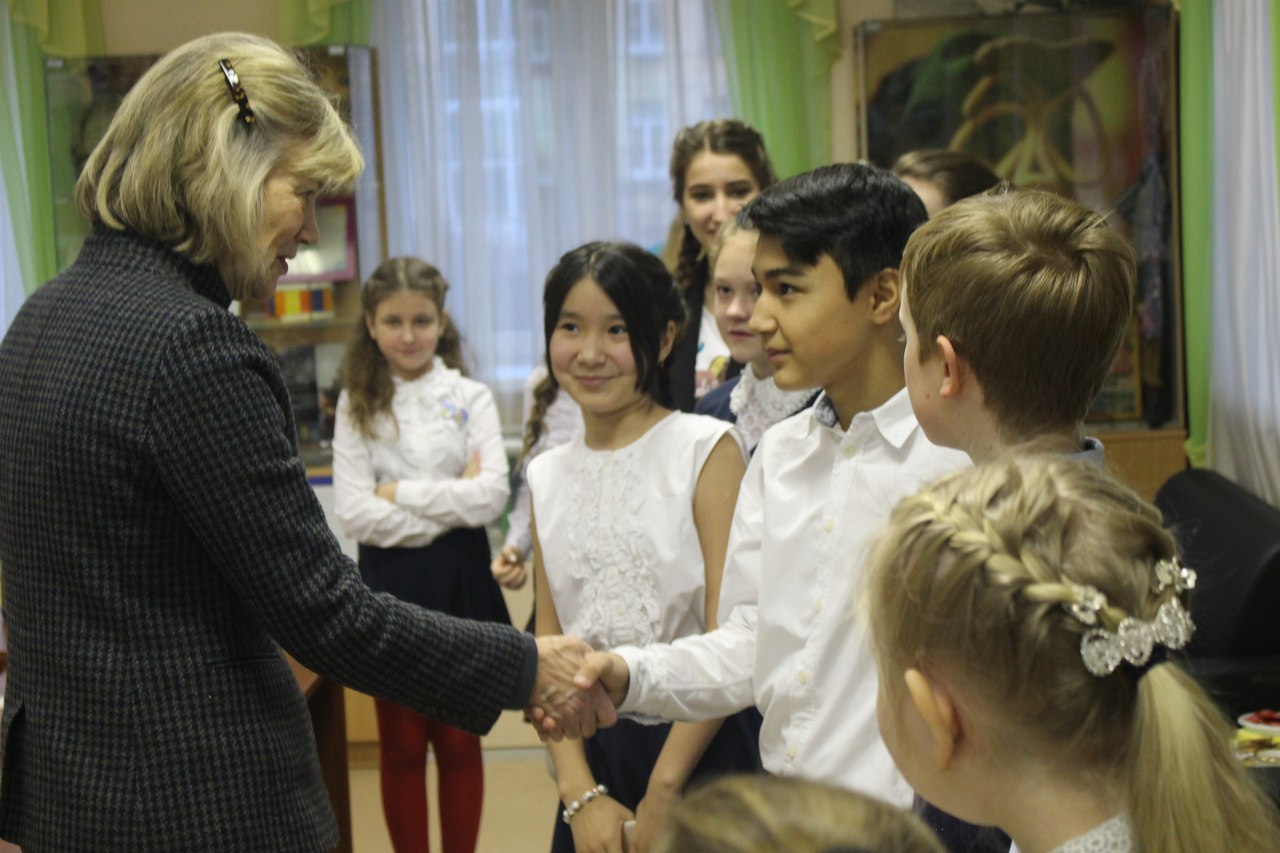
- The Duchess in 2017
- Born: Alexandra Anastasia Phillips; 27 February 1946; Tucson, Arizona, U.S.
- Died: 10 December 2018 (aged 72); London, England
- Buried: Baronscourt Parish Church, County Tyrone, Northern Ireland
- Spouse: James Hamilton, 5th Duke of Abercorn (m. 1966)
- Issue: James Hamilton, Marquess of Hamilton; Lady Sophia Hamilton; Lord Nicholas Hamilton
- Parents: Harold Phillips; Georgina Wernher

Alexandra Anastasia Hamilton, Duchess of Abercorn (née Phillips; 27 February 1946 – 10 December 2018), usually known by family and friends as Sacha Abercorn, was a British peeress and philanthropist. She was the wife of the 5th Duke of Abercorn, and a descendant of the Russian national poet Alexander Pushkin, in whose honour she founded the Pushkin Trust and the Pushkin prizes.

== Early life ==
Born Alexandra Anastasia Phillips in Tucson, Arizona, in 1946, she was the eldest daughter of Lieutenant Colonel Harold "Bunny" Phillips and Georgina Wernher. Her paternal grandparents were Colonel Joseph Harold John Phillips and Mary Mercedes Bryce, daughter of John Pablo Bryce. Her maternal grandparents were Sir Harold Wernher, 3rd Bt, and Countess Anastasia de Torby, morganatic daughter of Grand Duke Michael Mikhailovich of Russia. Through the countess, she and her siblings claimed descent from the Russian poet Alexander Pushkin and his great-grandfather, the Afro-Russian courtier Abram Petrovich Hannibal. Sacha, as she was known to friends and family, had a younger brother and three younger sisters, including Marita Crawley and Natalia Grosvenor, Duchess of Westminster.

'Sacha', as she was usually known, was born in Tucson, Arizona, where her family was living while her father recovered from tuberculosis. She was christened at St Margaret's Church, Westminster, with Lord Mountbatten, the Duchess of Kent, and Sir William Stephenson among her godparents. Upon returning to the United Kingdom, the family lived at Thorpe Lubenham Hall in Northamptonshire, and later Checkendon Court, in South Oxfordshire.

She was educated at St Mary's School, Wantage, and in Paris, but her mother forbade university. She had a debutante ball attended by 800 guests including the Queen and the Duke of Edinburgh at Luton Hoo, the Bedfordshire seat of her maternal grandparents, the Wernhers, in the summer of 1964.

== Marriage and issue ==
On 20 October 1966, at the age of 20, Phillips married James Hamilton, Marquess of Hamilton, Member of Parliament for Fermanagh and South Tyrone and son and heir apparent of the 4th Duke of Abercorn, at Westminster Abbey. Queen Elizabeth II and other members of the royal family attended, including Prince Andrew, who was a pageboy. In June 1979, James succeeded his father as 5th Duke of Abercorn and moved to the family seat, Baronscourt, near Newtownstewart in County Tyrone, Northern Ireland.

The Duke and Duchess had three children and three grandchildren:

- James Harold Charles Hamilton, Marquess of Hamilton (born 19 August 1969); married Tanya Marie Nation on 7 May 2004, had issue:
  - James Alfred Nicholas Hamilton, Viscount Strabane (born 30 October 2005)
  - Lord Claud Douglas Harold Hamilton (born 12 December 2007)
- Lady Sophia Alexandra Hamilton (born 8 June 1973); married Anthony Loyd on 7 September 2002, divorced 2005, no issue
- Lord Nicholas Edward Hamilton (born 5 July 1979); married Tatiana Kronberg on 30 August 2009, had issue
  - Valentina Neva Hamilton (born 19 December 2010)

Sacha was a close friend of Prince Philip, Duke of Edinburgh, who often came carriage driving at Baronscourt. Her younger sister, the Duchess of Westminster, is a godmother of William, Prince of Wales. Her husband was a first cousin of John Spencer, 8th Earl Spencer, father of Diana, Princess of Wales.

The Duchess died on 10 December 2018 at the age of 72 following an illness. Following a private funeral, she was buried at Baronscourt Parish Church, County Tyrone, Northern Ireland. A memorial service was held at St Anne's Cathedral, Belfast, on 30 May 2019, which was attended by the Duke of York.

== Philanthropy and public roles ==
A trained psychologist, she ran workshops throughout Ireland and Great Britain. The Duchess was the founder of the Pushkin Prizes and the Pushkin Trust, organizations promoting art therapy for young people. The Duchess held many patronages, such as Abercorn House at Cambridge House Grammar School, the Omagh Community Youth Choir and the BEARR Trust. She was honorary secretary of the Northern Ireland Centre for Trauma & Transformation in Omagh, County Tyrone. Her work in Omagh was in response to the 1998 Omagh bombing.

== Honours ==
=== National honours ===
- (United Kingdom) 14 June 2008: Officer of the Most Excellent Order of the British Empire (OBE)
- (United Kingdom) 11 November 1991: Officer (Sister) of the Most Venerable Order of the Hospital of St John of Jerusalem (OStJ)

=== Academic honours ===
- (United Kingdom) 2003: Honorary Doctorate from the University of Ulster

=== Miscellaneous honours ===
- 2006: Princess Grace Humanitarian Award

== Ancestry ==
Ancestors of Alexandra Hamilton, Duchess of Abercorn

8. Joseph Edward John Phillips
4. Joseph Harold John Phillips
9. Maud Henrietta Thurnall
2. Harold Pedro Joseph Phillips
10. John Pablo Bryce
5. Mary Mercedes Bryce
11. María de las Mercedes González de Cándamo e Iriarte
1. Alexandra Hamilton, Duchess of Abercorn
12. Sir Julius Wernher, 1st Baronet
6. Sir Harold Wernher, 3rd Baronet
13. Alice Sedgwick Mankiewicz
3. Georgina Wernher
14. Grand Duke Michael Mikhailovich of Russia
7. Countess Anastasia Mikhailovna de Torby
15. Countess Sophie Nikolaevna of Merenberg
