= Natalia Grosvenor, Duchess of Westminster =

British aristocrat (born 1959)

Her Grace The Dowager Duchess of Westminster
- Born: Natalia Ayesha Phillips; 8 May 1959 (age 67); London, England
- Spouse: Gerald Grosvenor, 6th Duke of Westminster (m. 1978; died 2016)
- Children: Lady Tamara van Cutsem; Lady Edwina Snow; Hugh Grosvenor, 7th Duke of Westminster; Lady Viola Roberts
- Parents: Harold Phillips (father); Georgina Wernher (mother)

Natalia Ayesha Grosvenor, Dowager Duchess of Westminster (née Phillips; born 8 May 1959), is a British aristocrat, philanthropist and winemaker. She is the widow of the 6th Duke of Westminster and mother of the 7th Duke. As of 2024, the Duchess's family, specifically her son, were 11th on the Sunday Times Rich List with a net worth of £10.127 billion.

== Personal life ==
Born Natalia Ayesha Phillips, she is the youngest daughter of Lieutenant Colonel Harold "Bunnie" Phillips and Georgina "Gina" Wernher.

Her paternal grandparents were Colonel Joseph Phillips and Mary Bryce, daughter of John Pablo Bryce. Her maternal grandparents were Sir Harold Wernher, 3rd Bt, and Countess Anastasia de Torby, morganatic daughter of Grand Duke Michael Mikhailovich of Russia. Tally, as she is known to friends and family, had an older brother, Nicholas (1947–1991), and three older sisters, including Marita Knight and the late Alexandra Hamilton, Duchess of Abercorn.

She and her siblings are direct descendants of poet Alexander Pushkin and Afro-Russian engineer Abram Gannibal.

The Duchess is godmother of William, Prince of Wales; in turn, Diana, Princess of Wales, was godmother of her daughter, Lady Edwina, and her son, Hugh, the current Duke of Westminster, is the godson of Charles III and godfather to Prince George of Wales and Prince Archie of Sussex.

== Career ==
The Duchess supports many charitable endeavours in Cheshire and across the United Kingdom, these include the Alex Moulton Charitable Trust and the Hospice of the Good Shepherd.

The Duchess owns a vineyard in Portofino called "La Cappelletta" where she produces Vermentino della Cappelletta, a Ligurian Vermentino.

== Marriage and issue ==
Natalia met Gerald Grosvenor, Earl Grosvenor, at a ball at Blenheim Palace in 1977.

They married the following year on 17 October 1978 at St Mary's Church, Luton, near her family seat, Luton Hoo. The bride wore a gown designed by Sarah Butler and an antique diamond and spinel tiara which Grosvenor had bought for her that had belonged to Princess Catherine Bagration. Upon marriage, Natalia was styled as Countess Grosvenor.

Four months later, Grosvenor's father died and he became the 6th Duke of Westminster, thus making Natalia the Duchess of Westminster. They had four children and seven grandchildren:

- Lady Tamara Katherine Grosvenor (born 20 December 1979), married Edward van Cutsem, member of the Van Cutsem family and son of Hugh van Cutsem, on 6 November 2004 at Chester Cathedral. They have three children:
  - Jake Louis Hannibal van Cutsem (born 21 May 2009)
  - Louis Hugh Lupus van Cutsem (born 17 April 2012)
  - Isla van Cutsem (born December 2015)
- Lady Edwina Louise Grosvenor (born 4 November 1981), married Daniel Snow on 27 November 2010. They have three children:
  - Zia Snow (born 13 October 2011)
  - Wolf Robert Snow (born 9 September 2014)
  - Orla Snow (born December 2015)
- Hugh Richard Louis Grosvenor, 7th Duke of Westminster (born 29 January 1991), married Olivia Henson on 7 June 2024. They have one daughter:
  - Lady Cosima Florence Grosvenor (born 27 July 2025)
- Lady Viola Georgina Grosvenor (born 12 October 1992) married Angus Roberts, of the Royal Scots Dragoon Guards, in 2022.

== Ancestry ==
Ancestors of Natalia Grosvenor, Duchess of Westminster

8. Joseph Edward John Phillips
4. Joseph Harold John Phillips
9. Maud Henrietta Thurnall
2. Harold Pedro Joseph Phillips
10. John Pablo Bryce
5. Mary Mercedes Bryce
11. María de las Mercedes González de Candamo y Iriarte
1. Natalia Grosvenor, Duchess of Westminster
12. Sir Julius Wernher, 1st Baronet
6. Sir Harold Wernher, 3rd Baronet
13. Alice Sedgwick Mankiewicz
3. Georgina Wernher
14. Grand Duke Michael Mikhailovich of Russia
7. Countess Anastasia Mikhailovna de Torby
15. Countess Sophie Nikolaievna of Merenberg

Natalia Grosvenor, Duchess of Westminster Born: 8 May 1959
Lines of succession
Preceded by Cosima Poloniecki	Line of succession to the British throne descendant of Princess Augusta of Great Britain, granddaughter of George II	Succeeded by Hugh Grosvenor, 7th Duke of Westminster
