= Georgina Kennard =

British noble (1919–2011)

Lady Kennard
- Born: Georgina Wernher; 17 October 1919; Edinburgh, Scotland
- Died: 28 April 2011 (aged 91); London, England
- Spouses: Harold Phillips (m. 1944; died 1980) Sir George Kennard, 3rd Bt (m. 1992; died 1999)
- Children: Alexandra Hamilton, Duchess of Abercorn; Nicholas Phillips; Fiona Burnett; Marita Knight; Natalia Grosvenor, Duchess of Westminster
- Parents: Sir Harold Wernher, 3rd Bt (father); Countess Anastasia Mikhailovna of Torby (mother)

Georgina, Lady Kennard (née Wernher; formerly Phillips; 17 October 1919 – 28 April 2011) was a British aristocrat who was considered "one of the best connected women in the country." She was connected to many prominent families such as the royal family and the Mountbattens, Grosvenors, Hamiltons and Burnetts and the Russian imperial family.

== Life ==
Georgina Wernher was born in Edinburgh, Scotland on 17 October 1919, the second child and elder daughter of Sir Harold Augustus Wernher, 3rd Bt, and Countess Anastasia de Torby.

She was the maternal granddaughter of Grand Duke Michael Mikhailovich of Russia (grandson of Tsar Nicholas I and first cousin of Tsar Alexander III), and also descended from the Russian writer Alexander Pushkin and the Afro-Russian military officer Abram Petrovich Hannibal. The family's country home was Luton Hoo. Gina "came out" as a debutante in the 1937 "coronation" season, aged only 17 but already having completed her education with studies in domestic science.

She was a godmother of Andrew Mountbatten-Windsor, formerly known as Prince Andrew of the United Kingdom, Duke of York.

On 10 October 1944, Gina Wernher married Lt.-Col. Harold "Bunny" Phillips (1909–1980), a former lover of Edwina, Countess Mountbatten of Burma. They had five children:

- Alexandra Anastasia Hamilton, Duchess of Abercorn known as 'Sacha' and was the goddaughter of Lord Louis Mountbatten (27 February 1946 – 9 December 2018)
- Nicholas Harold Phillips (23 August 1947 – 1 March 1991)
- Fiona Mercedes Burnett (born 30 March 1951), mother of Alexander Burnett
- Marita Georgina Crawley (born 28 May 1954)
- Natalia Ayesha Grosvenor, Duchess of Westminster (born 8 May 1959), mother of Lady Edwina Snow and Hugh Grosvenor, 7th Duke of Westminster

Lady Kennard's first husband, Harold Phillips, died in 1980. She was remarried in 1992 to Sir George Arnold Ford Kennard, 3rd Bt. (1915–1999).

Lady Kennard died at her home in London on 28 April 2011 aged 91 years old.

== Ancestry ==
Ancestors of Georgina Kennard

16. Wilhelm Wernher
8. Friedrich Augustus Wernher
17. Luise Mederacke
4. Sir Julius Charles Wernher, 1st Baronet
18. Karl Weidenbusch
9. Elisabeth Weidenbusch
19. Margarethe Kisselbach
2. Sir Harold Augustus Wernher, 3rd Baronet
20. Joel Mankiewicz
10. Jacob James Mankewicz
5. Alice Sedgwick Mankiewicz
22. John Allen Pigott
11. Ada Susan Pigott
23. Augusta Holliday
1. Georgina Kennard
24. Nicholas I of Russia
12. Grand Duke Michael Nikolaevich of Russia
25. Princess Charlotte of Prussia
6. Grand Duke Michael Mikhailovich of Russia
26. Leopold, Grand Duke of Baden
13. Princess Cecilie of Baden
27. Princess Sophie of Sweden
3. Countess Anastasia Mikhailovna de Torby
28. William, Duke of Nassau
14. Prince Nikolaus Wilhelm of Nassau
29. Princess Pauline of Württemberg
7. Countess Sophie of Merenberg
30. Alexander Pushkin
15. Natalia Alexandrovna Pushkina
31. Natalya Nikolaevna Goncharova
