= Wernher Triptych =

Ivory Byzantine triptych

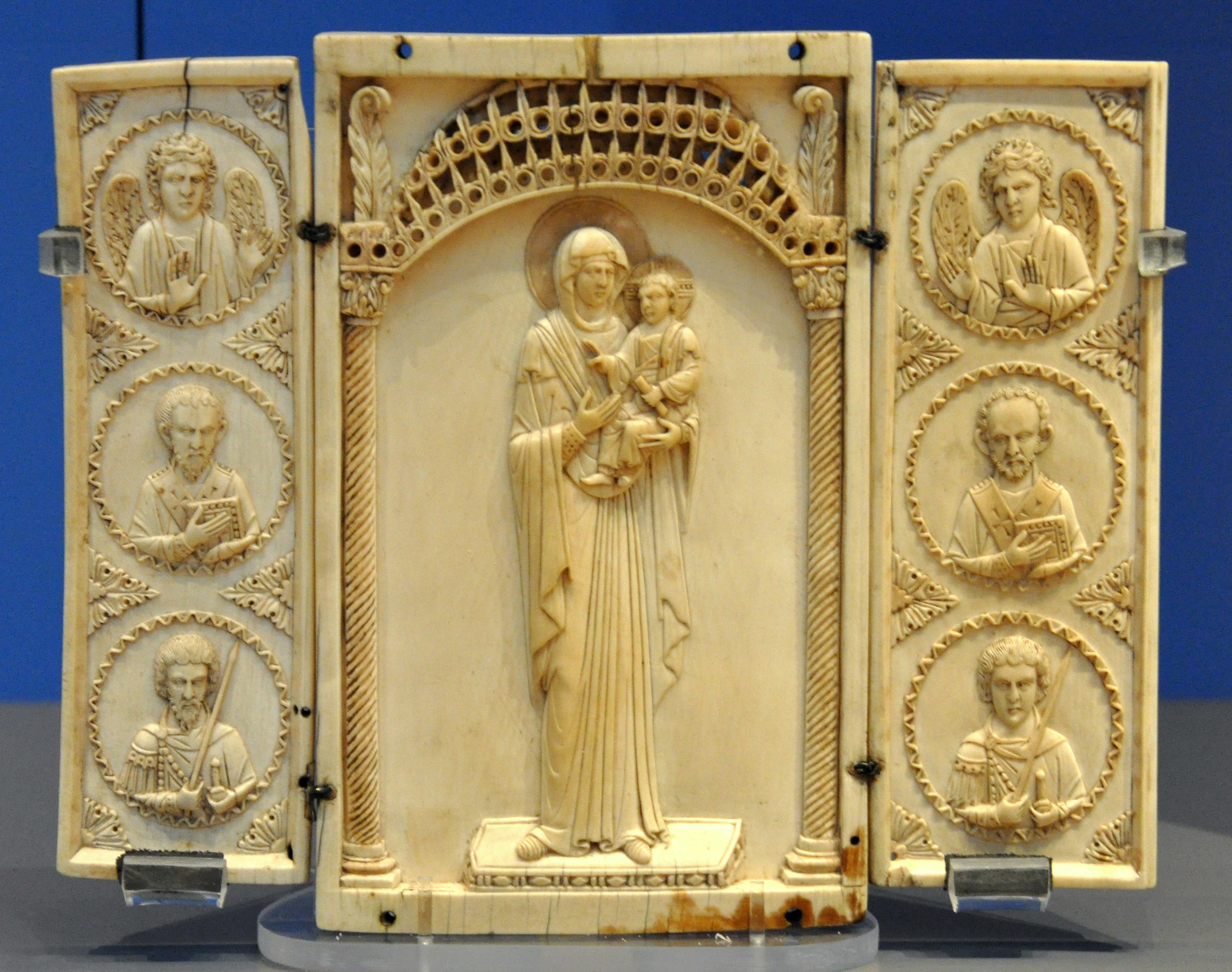
- Wernher Triptych
- Material: Ivory
- Size: 18.4cm by 16.8cm
- Created: 900-1000 AD
- Present location: British Museum, London
- Registration: 1978,0502.10

The Wernher Triptych is an ivory Byzantine triptych carved in Constantinople between 900 and 1000 AD.

== History ==
The triptych became part of the British Museum's collection in 1978, in lieu of taxes following the death of Sir Harold Wernher, son of the financier Sir Julius Wernher. The open market value of the nine ivory pieces acquired was estimated at £700,000 in 1976 upon their acquisition (equivalent to £4,514,262 in 2023).

== Description ==
In the central panel stands the Virgin Hodegetria; on the side leaves are carved an angel and two saints framed in medallions; on the left Saint Nicholas and Theodore the Martyr, on the right Saint John Chrysostom and Saint George.

== See also ==
- Borradaile Triptych
- Harbaville Triptych
