= Michaelovitch =

Michaelovitch may refer to:

- Alexis Michaelovitch, also known as Alexis of Russia
- Grand Duke Michael Mikhailovich of Russia
