= Dennis Robertson (politician) =

Scottish politician (born 1956)

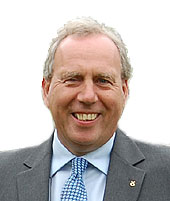

Member of the Scottish Parliament for Aberdeenshire West
- In office 5 May 2011 – 24 March 2016
- Preceded by: Constituency established
- Succeeded by: Alexander Burnett

Personal details
- Born: 14 August 1956 (age 69)
- Party: Scottish National Party
- Spouse: Anne

Dennis Robertson (born 14 August 1956) is a Scottish politician, and formerly a Member of the Scottish Parliament (MSP) for Aberdeenshire West constituency 2011–2016. He is a member of the Scottish National Party. He is the first blind MSP to be elected to the Scottish Parliament.

== Education and early career ==
Robertson was educated at the Royal Blind School in Edinburgh (1968–1974), then studied social work at Langside College (1981–1983). He worked as a social worker in Greenock from 1979. In 1989 he joined the Guide Dogs for the Blind association based in Forfar, before joining North East Sensory Services in 2005.

== Political career ==
He was elected to the Scottish Parliament in 2011, after defeating the Liberal Democrat incumbent, Mike Rumbles, by a majority of 4,112 votes. In 2013 he was involved wit ha consultation looking at legislating to crack down on the fraudulent use of blue disabled badges.

He stood again in 2016 but was unseated by Alexander Burnett.

He then stood for local government in 2017. He was elected to Aberdeenshire Council for the Stonehaven and lower Deeside ward.

== Personal life ==
Robertson has been registered as blind since he was 11. Married to Anne, the couple had two daughters. Their daughter Caroline died in February 2011, from complications arising from anorexia, after Robertson had started election campaigning.
