= Francis Bryce =

British Army officer (1876–1951)

Francis Bryce OBE (January/March 1876 in Bystock, St Thomas, Devon – 2 February 1951 in Bermuda) was a British military officer and the son of John Pablo Bryce, a member of the British gentry who served as sheriff of Devon.

== Family ==
Bryce was born in 1876 and was the son of John Pablo Bryce and María de las Mercedes González de Candamo y Iriarte, who was the sister of Manuel González de Candamo e Iriarte (1841–1904), President of Peru (1903–1904).

== Biography ==
Bryce held the rank of Major in the service of the King's Royal Rifle Corps. He was also an officer of the Order of the British Empire. He lived in Hamilton, Bermuda.

== Marriage and issue ==
Bryce married on 11 October 1935, in New York City, Gladys Jean Mosley (1905–1992) and was the father of at least one daughter:

- Janet Mercedes Bryce (Bermuda, 29 September 1937), who married on 17 November 1960 at St. Andrew's Church, Frognal, London, David Mountbatten, 3rd Marquess of Milford Haven
