= Marita Crawley =

British songwriter and author (born 1954)

Marita Georgina Knight (née Phillips; formerly Crawley; born 28 May 1954 in London, England) is a British songwriter and author.

Her lyrics have been recorded by artists such as Peter Skellern, Demis Roussos, William Lovelady and Art Garfunkel. She has written the libretto for the opera PUSHKIN, based on the lives of her great-great-great-grandfathers, Alexander Pushkin and Tsar Nicholas I of Russia; the music is by Konstantin Boyarsky. The opera was premiered in concert performance by Novaya Opera in Moscow on 4 February 2017. Its world premiere as a staged performance was at Grange Park Opera in July 2018.

Marita Phillips studied acting at The Guildhall School of Music and Drama and ballet at the Nesta Brooking School before training as a mime with Adam Darius, with whom she founded and ran The Mime Centre, London. She has written the book and lyrics for the children's musicals; The Dream Dealer and Buzz – the story of Glorybee. She has also written the novel The Dream Dealer.

== Family ==
She is the fourth of five children of Lt.-Col. Harold Pedro Joseph Phillips and his wife, Georgina Wernher, who was the elder daughter and co-heiress of Sir Harold Wernher, 3rd Bt, by his wife Countess Anastasia de Torby (later Lady Zia Wernher, CBE). Her elder sister was Alexandra Hamilton, Duchess of Abercorn and her youngest sister is Natalia Grosvenor, Duchess of Westminster (a godmother of William, Prince of Wales). Marita and her siblings are close to the British royal family, being distantly related to both Elizabeth II and Prince Philip, Duke of Edinburgh.

In 1982, Marita married Randall Crawley, a son of Aidan Crawley MP and his wife Virginia Cowles, journalist and author. Randall Crawley was killed with his brother Andrew in a private plane crash near Turin in Italy on 10 September 1988, leaving two sons and one daughter: Aidan Harold Winston Crawley (22 October 1983), Cosima Georgina Crawley (31 May 1985), and Galen Randall George Crawley (13 November 1988). His posthumous younger son Galen Crawley is a godson of Charles III. In 2006, Marita remarried, to the journalist turned media baron Andrew Knight.

== Siblings ==
- Alexandra Hamilton, Duchess of Abercorn (27 February 1946- 10 December 2018)
- Nicholas Harold Phillips (23 August 1947 – 1 March 1991)
- Fiona Mercedes Phillips (born 30 March 1951)
- Natalia Grosvenor, Duchess of Westminster (born 8 May 1959)

Lines of succession
Preceded by Elizabeth Burnett	Line of succession to the British throne descendant of Frederick, Prince of Wales, son of George II	Succeeded by Aidan Crawley
