= The Dream Dealer =

Children's musical

The Dream Dealer is a 2001 children's musical, with the book and lyrics by Marita Phillips and music by Harriet Petherick Bushman.

== History ==
The musical was originally commissioned and performed by a school in North London. 40 children between the ages of 10 and 14 took part. The show was further developed with Mountview Theatre School students in a workshop directed by Matthew White. The showcase was then presented at the Bridewell Theatre, London, performed by a cast of 11 young adult performers and directed by Matthew White.

Subsequently, it was performed in April 2005 by The Chipping Norton Youth Theatre, and was awarded a Fringe sell-out show logo at the Edinburgh Festival in 2006, and received rave reviews. Further productions include the Blackledge Theatre, Salisbury 2007, the Dar-al-Athat-al-Islamiyyah, Kuwait February 2008. St Austell, Cornwall and Mt Gambier, Australia 2009, E one 7, Walthamstow, Nagoya International School, Japan, Act 2 Drama School, London 2009, Stagecalls Theatre School, Exmouth 2010.

The Dream Dealer by Marita Phillips is also a novel for 9-12 year-olds published in 2011. The cover illustration is by Zdenko Basic and Manuel Sumberac. It has 231 pages. See a review The Spectator December 2011.
