= Borradaile Triptych =

Ivory Byzantine triptych carved in Constantinople between 900 and 1000 AD

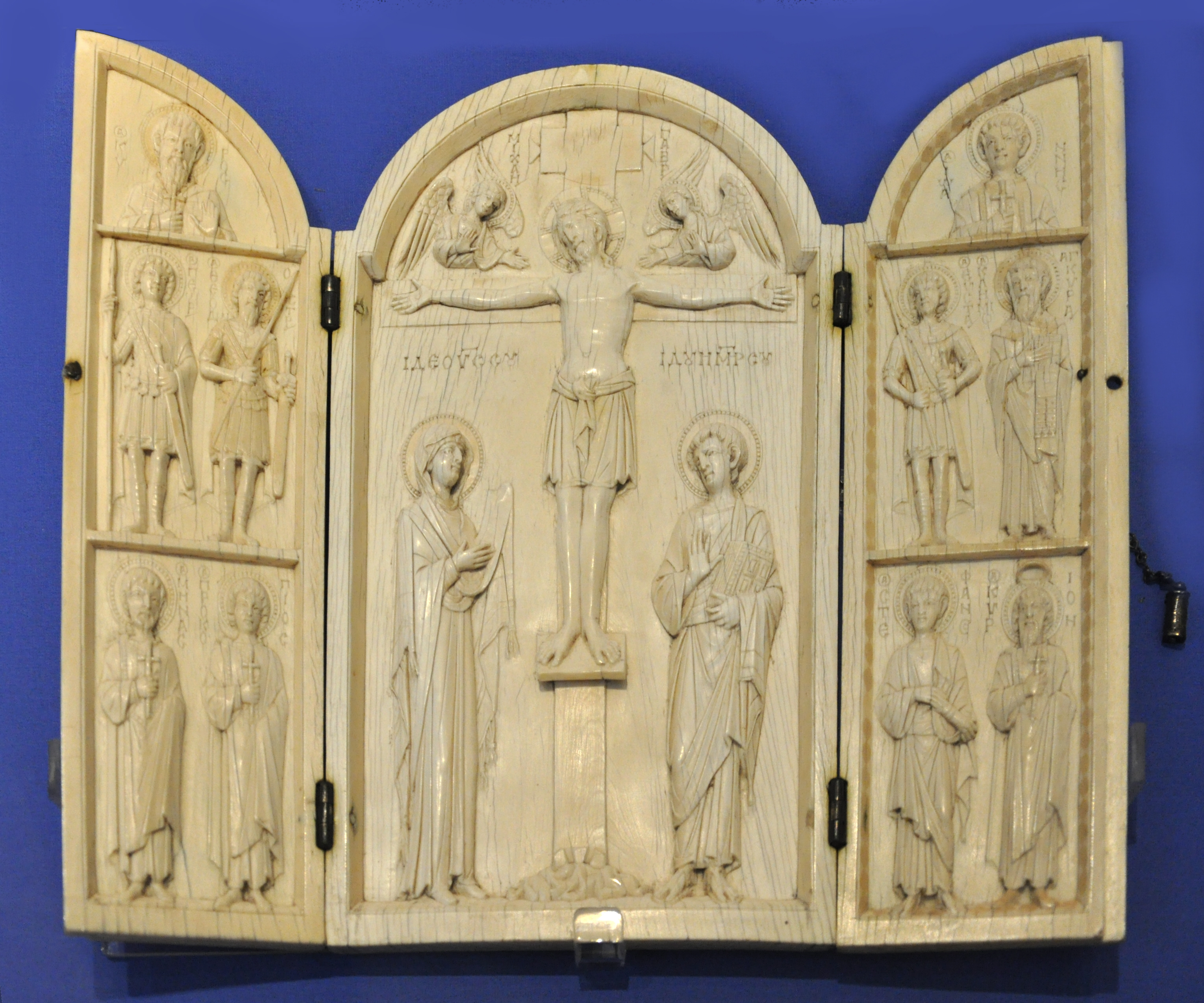
- Borradaile Triptych
- Material: ivory
- Size: 27.8cm by 22.7cm
- Created: 900-1000 AD
- Present location: British Museum, London
- Registration: 1923,1205.1

The Borradaile Triptych is an ivory Byzantine triptych carved in Constantinople between 900 and 1000 AD. It was bequeathed by Charles Borradaile to the British Museum, in London, in 1923, and is one of the "Romanos Group" of ivories that are closely connected with the Imperial Court, along with the Harbaville Triptych and Wernher Triptych.

== Description ==
The central panel of the triptych has a height of 270 mm and is carved with the Crucifixion, with the Virgin Mary and St. John to each side and half-length figures of the archangels Michael and Gabriel above. The Greek inscription above their heads reads "Behold thy Son; Behold thy Mother" (John 19.26-7). On the left leaf, from top to bottom are carved St. Cyrus; St. George and Theodore Stratelates, with St. Menas and St. Procopius below; on the right leaf are carved the figures of St. John, St. Eustathius, Clement of Ancyra with St. Stephen and St. Kyrion above. On the reverse are two crosses and roundels containing the busts of St. Joachim and St. Anna in the centre, with St. Basil and St. Barbara, and John the Persian and St. Thecla in the terminals. Traces of a painted lozenge can be seen in the right-hand leaf.

== Original owner ==
The choice of saints must reflect the interests of the patron who originally ordered the triptych to be made. It has been speculated that it was made for Anna Porphyrogenita, daughter of the Emperor Romanos II, but this cannot be substantiated.
