= Bio-bean =

British waste recycling company

bio-bean Limited
- Type: Private
- Industry: Recycling; Manufacturing; Flavor Ingredients; Solid Fuels; Raw Material Supply; Renewables
- Founded: London, England 2013
- Founder: Arthur Kay
- Fate: Acquired in 2023
- Headquarters: Cambridgeshire, England
- Products: Coffee Logs; Coffee biomass pellets; Natural coffee flavour ingredient; Recycled coffee raw material
- Number of employees: 45

Bio-bean was a private company that industrialised the process of recycling waste coffee grounds into advanced biofuels and biomass pellets.

The company was located in London, England, and built the world's first waste coffee recycling factory in Cambridgeshire. It was founded in 2013 by Arthur Kay. In 2014 the company was awarded £400,000 as the winner of the Postcode Lottery Green Challenge contest. In 2022 after an assessment by B Corp, bio-bean was announced as the B Corp Best in the World Environment, with an overall score of 99.1.

== History ==
Bio-bean was conceived while Arthur Kay was still an architecture student at The Bartlett, University College London (UCL). Faced with the challenge of designing a coffee shop and roastery, Arthur realised that coffee was being wasted everywhere and set up bio-bean to recycle waste coffee grounds into advanced biofuels.

Bio-bean collected waste coffee grounds from hundreds of coffee shops, restaurants, office blocks, and coffee factories.

His idea won awards and support from the Mayor of London, UCL, Tata, Santander, and Shell. bio-bean became a part of the Ellen MacArthur Foundation CE100, and its products were exhibited at The Science Museum. The company was also awarded funding from Innovate UK. Bio-bean's London collection service was launched by Mayor Boris Johnson and Conservative MP Zac Goldsmith, and its 40,000 sq ft factory was opened in 2015 with the capacity to process 50,000 tonnes per year.

In 2015 Kay became the youngest-ever Guardian Sustainable Business Leader of the Year. In 2016 Bio-bean won the Virgin Media Business VOOM Grow category. In 2017 bio-bean collaborated with Shell, Argent Energy, and Transport for London to create biodiesel from used coffee grounds, which has been used to power London's buses. The campaign achieved a global reach of 11.8 billion through purely earned media activation. The campaign was featured in global media outlets such as the BBC, Bloomberg, New York Times, The Independent, among many others. In 2017 according to reports, Bio-bean launched its ad campaign after winning Richard Branson's Virgin Voom competition.

In March 2023 Bio-bean collapsed following strong domestic inflation and a factory fire. In July 2023 Envar Composting Ltd, a large UK-based bioenergy company, acquired Bio-Bean's assets.

In March 2025, Bio-bean entered creditors' voluntary liquidation.

== Biofuel ==
Bio-bean's products were second-generation biofuels. Pellet fuels, namely biomass pellets, from waste coffee grounds, are burned in biomass boilers as a sustainable, local renewable heat alternative. bio-bean also produced briquettes and barbecue charcoal from waste coffee grounds bio-bean conducted extensive research and development into biodiesel, biochemicals, and further uses for waste coffee grounds and other organic waste streams.

== See also ==
- Biodiesel from used coffee
