= Lady Edwina Grosvenor =

English criminologist (born 1981)

Lady Edwina Grosvenor DL
- Born: Edwina Louise Grosvenor; 4 November 1981 (age 45); Eaton Hall, Cheshire, England
- Occupations: Criminologist; philanthropist; prison reformer
- Spouse: Dan Snow (m. 2010)
- Children: 3
- Parents: Gerald Grosvenor, 6th Duke of Westminster (father); Natalia Phillips (mother)

Lady Edwina Louise Grosvenor DL (born 4 November 1981) is an English criminologist, philanthropist and prison reformer. She is a founder and a trustee of the charity The Clink, and founder of the charity One Small Thing. She is the sister of Hugh Grosvenor, 7th Duke of Westminster.

== Early life and education ==
Lady Edwina Louise Grosvenor was born at the family seat of Eaton Hall, Cheshire, on 4 November 1981. She is the daughter of the 6th Duke of Westminster and Natalia Ayesha Phillips. Through her mother, she is descended from the Romanov imperial family of Russia and the Russian writer Alexander Pushkin, as well as from the latter's great-grandfather – African tribal chief turned Russian nobleman Abram Petrovich Hannibal. Grosvenor's godmother was Diana, Princess of Wales. She went to a private school, Ellesmere College, in Shropshire. At the age of 12, she was taken to visit a Liverpool rehabilitation centre, where she was introduced to heroin addicts and became interested in helping society's unseen people. At age 15, she volunteered at a homeless shelter run by the charity Save the Family. She spent her gap year working in a prison in Kathmandu before studying criminology at Northumbria University. She studied criminal behaviour at Edith Cowan University in Perth, Australia. In August 2021, Grosvenor graduated from Solent University with a master's degree in criminology and crime scene management, achieving a distinction.

== Career ==
=== Prison reform ===
During her time in Nepal, Grosvenor worked for The Esther Benjamins Trust, now Child Rescue Nepal, a UK-registered charity which works to have children removed from prison, where they were held when their parents were convicted of crimes. She also worked at the Central Jail in Kathmandu. Lady Edwina commissioned research by the Corston Coalition into the needs of women offenders, set up in the wake of the 2007 report by Jean Corston, Baroness Corston. She spent a year as a support worker at Cheshire's HM Prison Styal, then worked in HM Prison Garth in Lancashire, helping with the restorative justice program. She sits on the advisory board for Female Offenders under the Secretary of State for Justice and, from 2007 to 2010, was an advisor to James Jones, then Bishop of Liverpool and Bishop to Her Majesty's Prisons. In 2009, Grosvenor became the founding investor of The Clink, a charity that identifies the training and support needed for prisoners to find jobs following release. The Clink restaurant, a fine-dining training restaurant, opened in HM Prison High Down in 2009. She served as a trustee of the charity from 2011 to 2018, and then as one of its ambassadors. She also works with Pathways, a London-based community regeneration program that helps to create sustainable businesses run by former offenders.

In 2014, Grosvenor presented the BBC Radio 4 Charity Appeal for the Prisoners' Advice Service. In 2015, she visited Ellesmere College and delivered a speech about prison reform and rehabilitation. She founded One Small Thing, a charity that seeks to understand the trauma within the prison system and raise awareness of how compassion and respect can prevent women from re-offending. One Small Thing trains prison staff about trauma, helps them change their behaviour to protect women inmates, and develops trauma services within prisons. Grosvenor founded the Becoming Trauma Informed programme across the Female Prison Estate in England and Wales. In September 2017, One Small Thing collaborated with the Rumi Foundation to research women's prisons around the country. In 2018, One Small Thing was awarded the Howard League for Penal Reform's Criminal Justice Champion Award.

Grosvenor became a member of the advisory board to the Centre for Criminology in the Faculty of Law at the University of Oxford, and, in 2020, donated £90,000 to the University of Oxford to fund the Death Penalty Research Unit.

Grosvenor worked on a project called Hope Street, a healing residential community alternative for women who were in custody prior to sentencing or already served their sentences alongside their children. The programme was monitored by the University of Southampton, The Prison Reform Trust and EP:IC.

In March 2022, Grosvenor became High Sheriff of Hampshire for a one-year term. She was appointed a deputy lieutenant of Hampshire in 2025.

=== Recognition ===
In July 2018, Grosvenor was awarded an honorary fellowship of Liverpool John Moores University for her contribution to public life.

== Personal life ==
Grosvenor married television presenter Dan Snow on 27 November 2010. The couple were married by the Bishop of Liverpool, James Jones, at his official residence, Bishop's Lodge. They have three children.

Lady Edwina Grosvenor Born: 4 November 1981
Lines of succession
Preceded by Isla van Cutsem	Line of succession to the British throne descendant of Frederick, Prince of Wales, son of George II	Succeeded by Zia Snow
