= Harold Wernher =

British military officer (1893–1973)

Major-General Sir Harold Wernher Bt GCVO TD
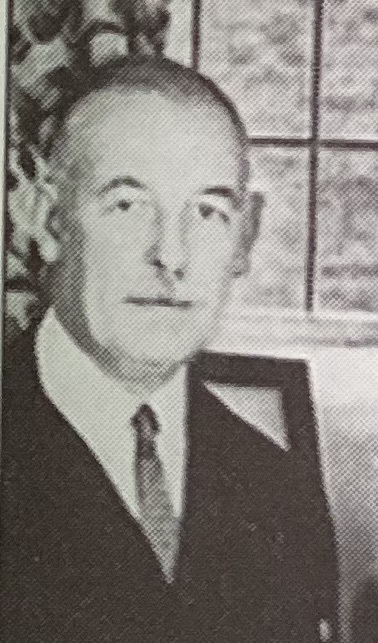
- Wernher in 1948
- Born: 16 January 1893
- Died: 30 June 1973 (aged 80); Luton, Bedfordshire, England
- Spouse: Countess Anastasia Mikhailovna de Torby (m. 1917)
- Children: George Wernher; Georgina, Lady Kennard; Myra, Lady Butter
- Military career
- Allegiance: United Kingdom
- Branch: British Army
- Service years: 1914–1928; 1939–1945
- Rank: Major-General
- Service number: 43053
- Commands: 5th Battalion, Bedfordshire and Hertfordshire Regiment
- Conflicts: First World War; Second World War
- Awards: Knight Grand Cross of the Royal Victorian Order; Territorial Decoration; Mentioned in Despatches (3)

Major-General Sir Harold Augustus Wernher, 3rd Baronet, GCVO, TD (16 January 1893 – 30 June 1973) was a British Army officer and diamond magnate.

== Life and career ==
Wernher was born on 16 January 1893 the second son of Sir Julius Wernher, 1st Baronet, and his wife, Alice Sedgwick Mankiewicz. His father was a German-born Randlord and his mother was of Polish-Jewish ancestry. He reached the rank of major-general during the Second World War, and he played an important role in coordinating the logistics of Operation Overlord.

=== Second World War ===
In September 1943, Wernher was appointed by Prime Minister Winston Churchill as Co-Ordinator of Ministry and Service Facilities (CMSF), in charge of overseeing the construction of all the Mulberry Harbour components.

In 1948, he inherited the Wernher baronetcy from his elder brother, Sir Derrick Wernher (1889–1948), who had no male heir. He had previously inherited Luton Hoo after his father's death in 1912.

He died in 1973 at Luton, Bedfordshire, and as he did not have any surviving male heir, the baronetcy became extinct. To avoid death duties, the Wernher estate donated the Wernher Triptych to the British Museum.

== Marriage and children ==
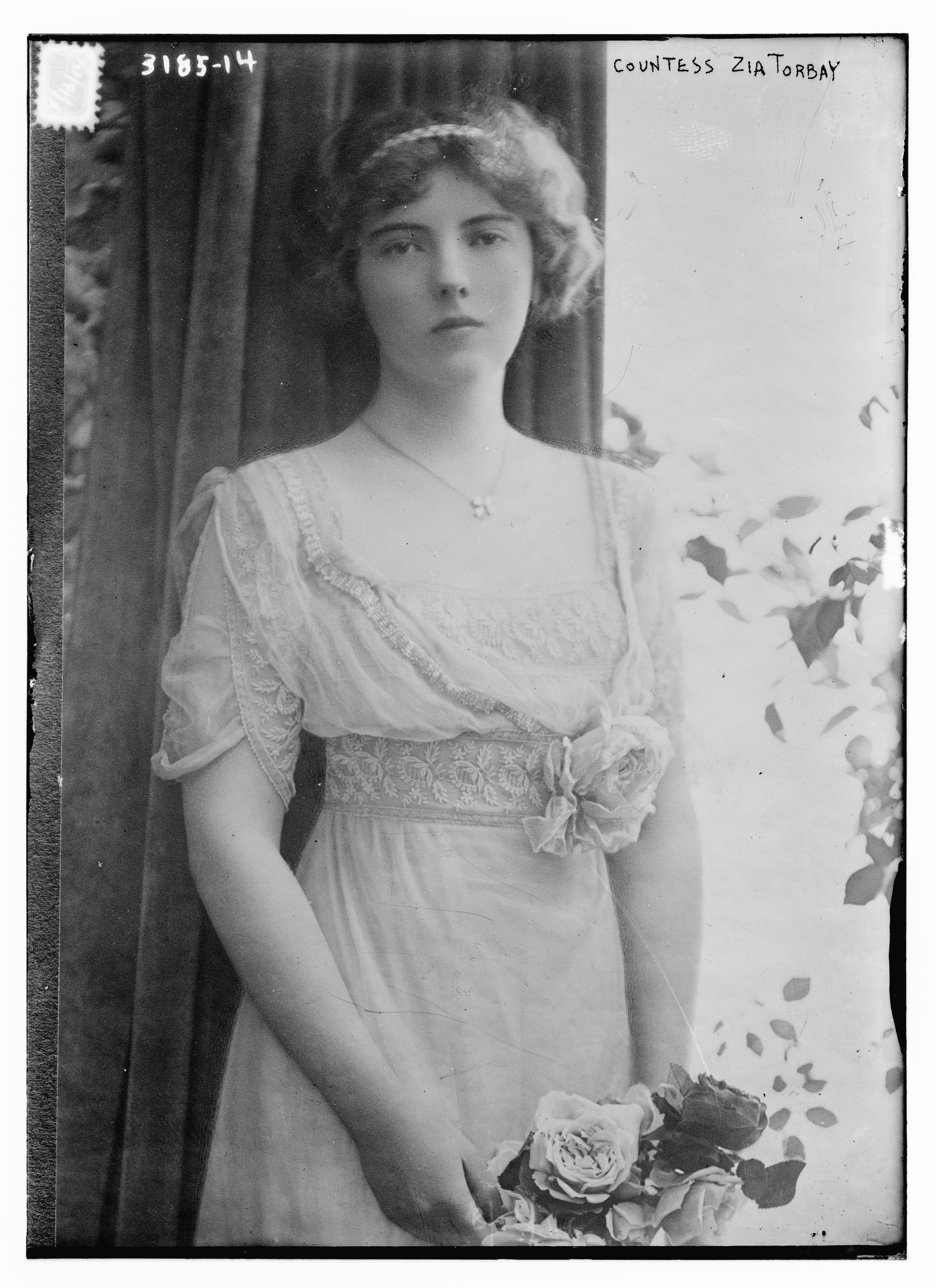
Wernher's wife, Countess Anastasia Mikhailovna de Torby

On 20 July 1917, Wernher married Countess Anastasia Mikhailovna de Torby, the eldest child of Grand Duke Michael Mikhailovich of Russia and his morganatic wife, Countess Sophie Nikolaievna of Merenberg, first in a Russian Orthodox ceremony in the chapel of the Russian Embassy in Welbeck Street then in an Anglican ceremony in the Chapel Royal at St James's Palace attended by King George V and Queen Mary. They had three children:

- Captain George Michael Alexander Wernher (22 August 1918 – 4 December 1942), killed in action during World War II.
- Georgina Wernher (17 October 1919 – 28 April 2011), married, first, Harold Joseph Phillips (6 November 1909 – 27 October 1980) on 10 October 1944, had issue, second, Sir George Kennard, 3rd Bt., in December 1992, no issue.
- Myra Alice Wernher (8 March 1925 – 29 July 2022), married David Henry Butter (1920–2010) on 5 November 1946, had issue.

His descendants include the 7th Duke of Westminster and the heirs apparent to the dukedom of Abercorn and the earldom of Dalhousie.

== Arms ==
Coat of arms of Harold Wernher

Crest
Between two elephant's trunks the dexter per fess Gules and Or and the sinister per fess Or and Gules a lozenge Sable thereon a mullet as in the arms.
Escutcheon
Gules the head of a grappling iron in saltire Argent issuing from the base a mount Vert and in the dexter and sinister base a mullet of six points Or.

Baronetage of the United Kingdom
Preceded by Derrick Wernher	Baronet (of Luton Hoo, Bedfordshire); 1948–1973	Extinct
