= Julius Wernher =

German-born diamond magnate and collector (1850–1912)

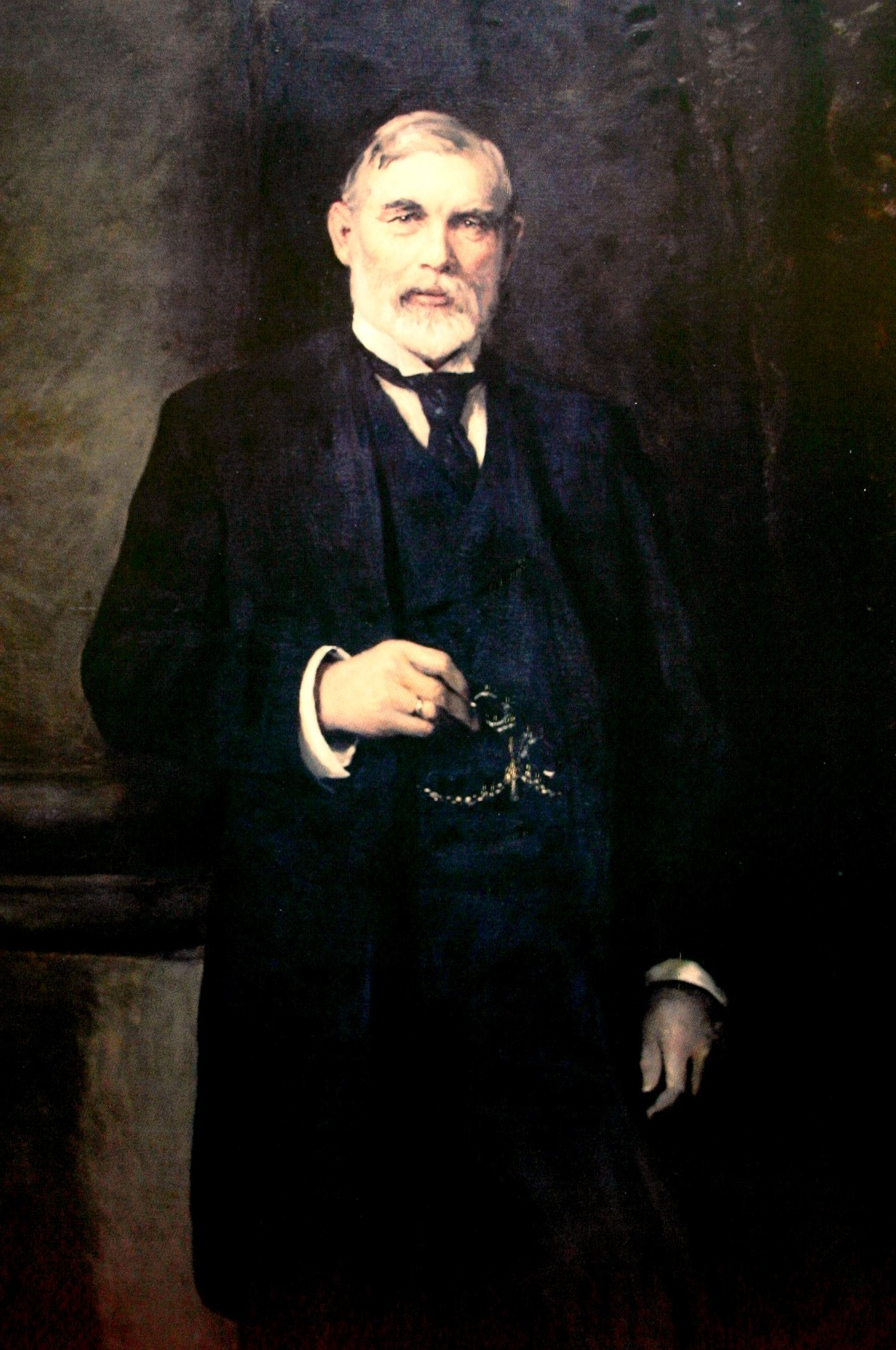
Sir Julius Wernher Hubert von Herkomer 1912 Oil on canvas 173 x 120 cm.

Sir Julius Charles Wernher, 1st Baronet (9 April 1850 – 21 May 1912) was a German-born Randlord, diamond magnate, and art collector. He became part of the English establishment.

== Life history ==
Born in Darmstadt, Hesse, Wernher was the son of Elisabeth (Weidenbusch) and Friedrich Augustus Wernher, a railway engineer of Protestant stock. He was educated at Frankfurt-am-Main, where he entered a merchant bank. In 1871, having served in the Franco-German War, he moved to London at the age of 21. His talent for business was spotted by a diamond dealer named Jules Porgès of London and Paris, who sent Wernher in 1873 as his agent to the diamond mines of Kimberley, South Africa to buy and export diamonds. Wernher bought up mining interests and by 1875 was a member of the Kimberley mining board. In that same year, Porgès and Alfred Beit joined him in Kimberley, and Porgès formed the Compagnie Française des Mines de Diamants du Cap. Porgès returned to London after having made Wernher and Beit partners in the firm of Jules Porgès & Co. By 1884 Wernher returned to London and traded in diamond shares, while Beit remained in Kimberley to look after their interests. On Porgès' retirement in 1889, the firm was restructured and named Wernher, Beit & Co.

With the discovery in 1886 of gold on the Witwatersrand, the firm appointed Hermann Eckstein as their representative in Johannesburg, while Cecil Rhodes and Beit effectively amalgamated the Kimberley diamond mines by 1888 and enabled Wernher, Beit & Co. to acquire a controlling interest in De Beers Consolidated Mines. Wernher by now was managing over 70 South African companies from his London office, and developing a passion for collecting art. He was created a baronet in 1905, as well as being a member of the Order of the Crown of Prussia. Despite having a reputation for prudence in business, Wernher was swindled out of £64,000 in 1906 by Henri Lemoine, who claimed he could make synthetic diamonds.

Beset by failing health in 1911, Wernher merged the shareholdings of Wernher, Beit & Co. with those of Central Mining and Investment Corporation and Rand Mines Ltd. Besides his interest in art, Wernher funded an extension to the National Physical Laboratory. He also bequeathed £250,000 to establishing a university in Cape Town, and £100,000 to the Imperial College of Science and Technology in London.

At the time of his death in London, he was one of the richest men in the United Kingdom with a fortune of £12 million (then $60 million in face value, then more than about 20–30 times current purchasing power). This accumulation of wealth was due to his exploitation of African workers. Whernher’s business partner, Beit, financed the Jameson Raid, a botched attempt to overthrow the South African Republic.

== Art ==
Wernher kept his art collection at his London mansion, Bath House in Piccadilly, and at his country house Luton Hoo (occupied by Robert de Hoo in 1245). Much of it is now on display at Ranger's House in the London suburb of Greenwich. In 1897 Wernher bought what was thought to be a later copy of the Madonna of the Pomegranate; the original was painted by Sandro Botticelli in 1487. Restoration work carried out by English Heritage, and extensive testing, have shown that the painting at Ranger's House did in fact originate from Botticelli's 15th Century workshop in Florence.

A statue of Wernher flanks the entrance to the Royal School of Mines in London.

== Marriage and children ==
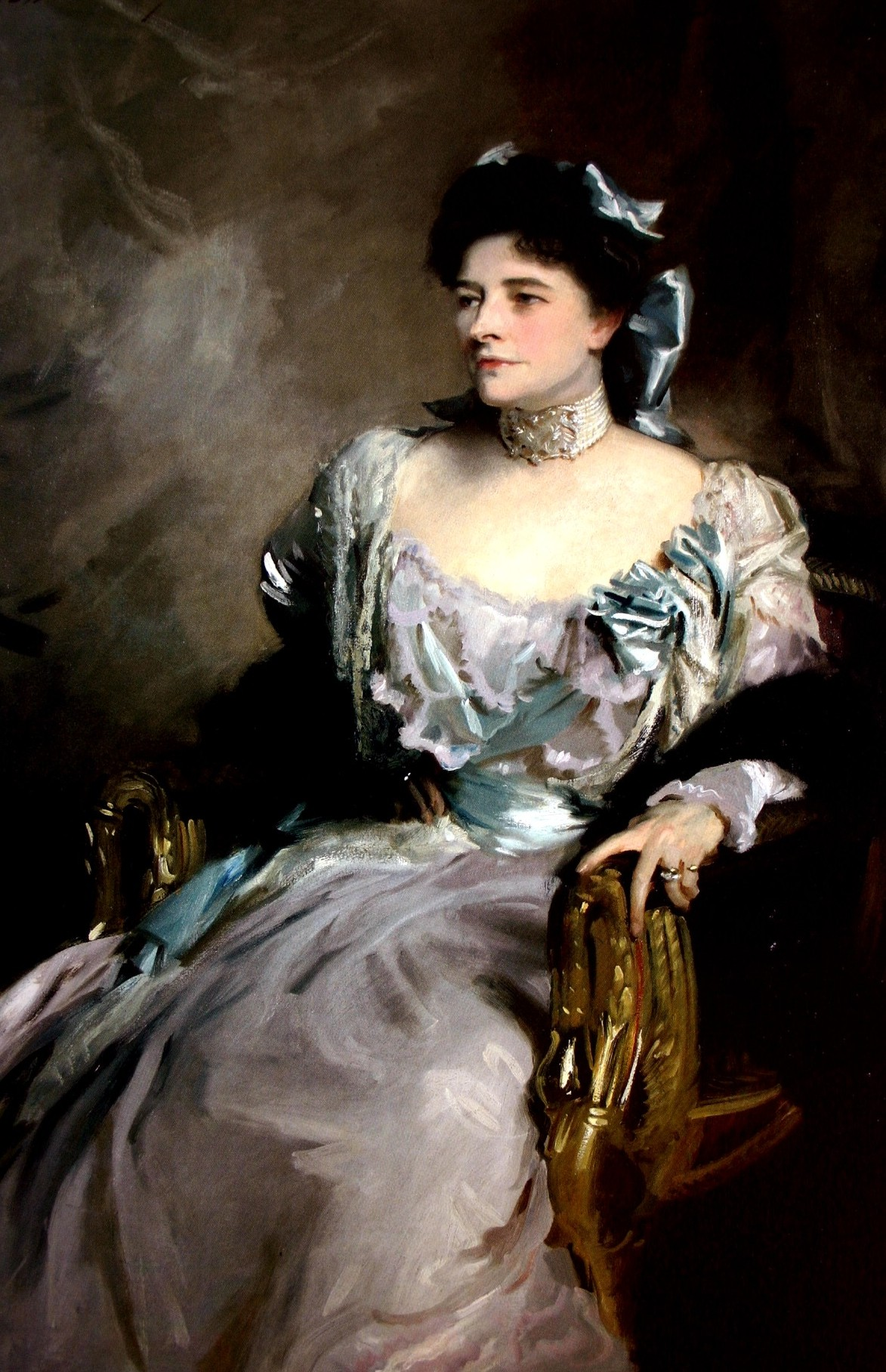
Alice Wernher John Singer Sargent 1902 Oil on canvas 148 x 98 cm.

On 12 June 1888, he married socialite Alice Sedgwick Mankiewicz (1862 – 30 November 1945), nicknamed "Birdie", whom he described as "bright-eyed, fair-haired, small, intelligent and musical". She was the daughter of Jacob "James" Mankiewicz (1830–1879) from Danzig, the son of Joel Mankiewicz, a Polish Jewish merchant. Her mother was Ada Susan Pigott from Colchester, who had a brother who was a general. Birdie and her mother lived in part of a big mid-Victorian house in Bayswater, at 15a Pembridge Square.

They had three sons:

1. Sir Derrick Julius Wernher, 2nd Baronet (7 June 1889 – 6 March 1948), married Theodora Anna Romanoff, daughter of Nikita Romanoff (from an exiled Russian noble family – not related to the Imperial House of Romanov—whose members were in charge of the enterprise Sibirsky telegraf, "The Siberian Telegraph", in 1861), on 14 December 1922.
  1. Anna Alexandra Wernher (14 May 1924 – May 2010)
2. Major-General Sir Harold Augustus Wernher, 3rd Baronet (16 January 1893 – 30 June 1973), married Countess Anastasia de Torby (9 September 1892 – 7 December 1977), eldest child of Grand Duke Michael Mikhailovich of Russia and his morganatic wife, Sophie of Merenberg, Countess de Torby, daughter of Prince Nikolaus Wilhelm of Nassau and his morganatic wife, Russian noblewoman Natalia Pushkina.
  1. Captain George Michael Alexander Wernher (Edinburgh, Scotland, 22 August 1918 – Béja, Tunisia, 4 December 1942), killed in action during the North Africa Campaign, aged 24, while serving with 17th/21st Lancers Royal Armoured Corps. He is buried at Medjez-el-Bab War Cemetery at Béja in Tunisia.
  2. Georgina Wernher (17 October 1919 – 28 April 2011), married London 10 October 1944 Lt.-Col. Harold Pedro Joseph Phillips (1909–1980), son of Colonel Joseph Harold John Phillips. Remarried London December 1992 Lt.-Col. Sir George Arnold Ford Kennard, 3rd Bt., son of Sir Coleridge Arthur Fitzroy Kennard, 1st Bt., and Dorothy Katherine Barclay. She had five children from her first marriage.
  3. Myra Alice Wernher, CVO (18 March 1925 – 29 July 2022), married 5 November 1946 Major Sir David Henry Butter, son of Colonel Charles Adrian James Butter. They had five children, including Georgina Butter, goddaughter and bridesmaid to Princess Alexandra of Kent.
3. Second Lieutenant Alexander Pigott Wernher (18 January 1897 – 10 September 1916), killed in action at the Battle of Delville Wood, aged 19, while serving with Prince of Wales's Coy., 1st Bn. Welsh Guards. He is buried in the Citadel New Military Cemetery at Fricourt.

The Wernher Mausoleum is in the Churchyard of Holy Trinity, East Hyde.

Alice, Lady Wernher, the widow of Sir Julius, remarried on 25 September 1919 to Henry Lopes, 2nd Baron Ludlow (30 September 1865 – 8 November 1922). Upon her remarriage, she became known as Lady Ludlow.

== Arms ==
Coat of arms of Julius Wernher

Crest
Between two elephant's trunks the dexter per fess Gules and Or and the sinister per fess Or and Gules a lozenge Sable thereon a mullet as in the arms.
Escutcheon
Gules the head of a grappling iron in saltire Argent issuing from the base a mount Vert and in the dexter and sinister base a mullet of six points Or.

Baronetage of the United Kingdom
New creation	Baronet (of Luton Hoo, Bedfordshire); 1905–1912	Succeeded by Derrick Wernher
