= Anastasia de Torby =

Anastasia Mikhailovna
- Countess de Torby; Lady Anastasia Mikhailovna Wernher
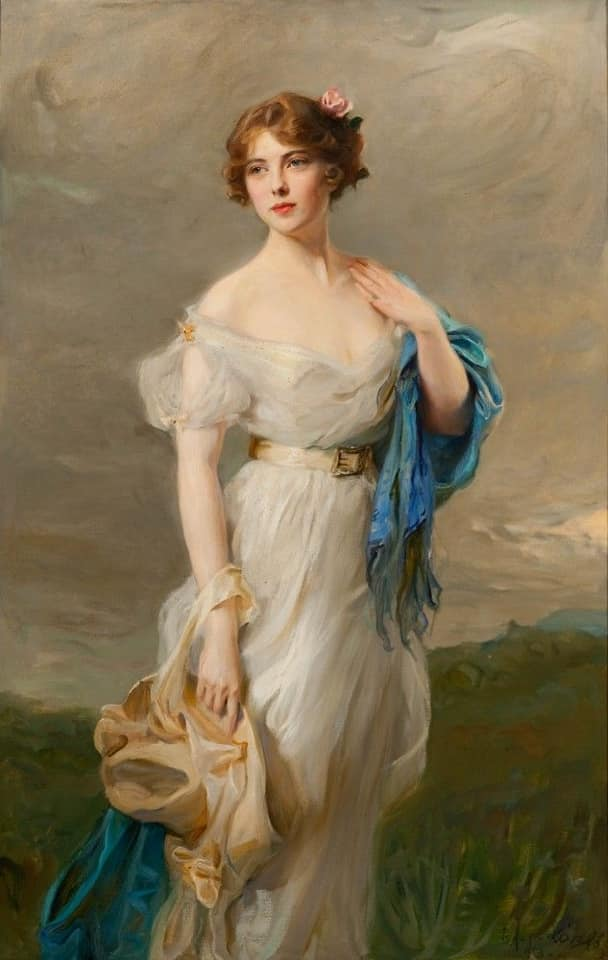
- Portrait by Philip de László, 1913
- Born: 9 September 1892; Wiesbaden, Hesse-Nassau, Kingdom of Prussia, German Empire
- Died: 7 December 1977 (aged 85); London, England
- Spouse: Sir Harold Wernher, 3rd Bt (m. 1917; died 1973)
- Issue: George Wernher; Georgina, Lady Kennard; Myra, Lady Butter
- House: Holstein-Gottorp-Romanov-Torby
- Father: Grand Duke Michael Mikhailovich of Russia
- Mother: Countess Sophie Nikolaievna of Merenberg

Lady Anastasia Mikhailovna Wernher CBE (née Countess Anastasia Mikhailovna de Torby; Russian: Анастасия Михайловна Де Торби; 9 September 1892 – 7 December 1977), also known as Lady Zia Wernher, was a German-born Russian-British aristocrat and thoroughbred racehorse owner.

She was the elder daughter of Grand Duke Michael Mikhailovich of Russia by his morganatic wife, Countess Sophie Nikolaievna of Merenberg. She was the owner of Charlottown, winner of the 1966 Epsom Derby.

== Early life ==
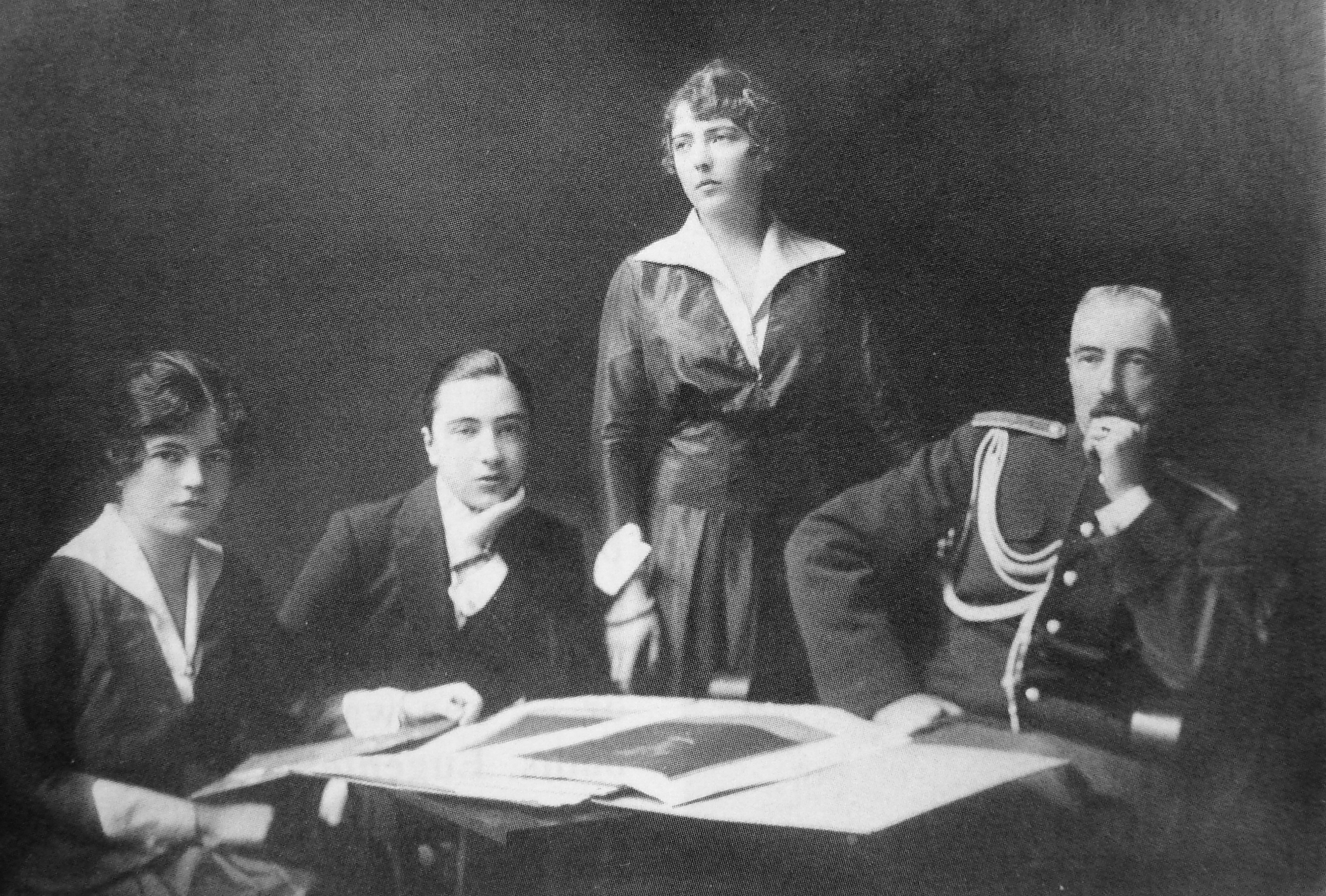
Grand Duke Michael Mikailovich of Russia (right) with his children (from left to right) Nadejda, Michael and Anastasia

Born on 9 September 1892 in Wiesbaden, Countess Anastasia Mikhailovna de Torby, known as Zia, was the first child and elder daughter of Grand Duke Michael Mikhailovich of Russia, a grandson of Tsar Nicholas I of Russia, by his morganatic wife, Countess Sophie Nikolaievna of Merenberg. Her mother was herself the morganatic daughter of Prince Nikolaus Wilhelm of Nassau and Natalia Alexandrovna Pushkina, daughter of Russian poet Alexander Pushkin. Following her parents' elopement to San Remo in 1891 and consequent banishment from Russia, Sophie was made Countess de Torby by her uncle, Adolphe, Grand Duke of Luxembourg. Due to her unequal birth, Zia was unable to inherit her father's title or rank, but was able to inherit her mother's Luxembourgish comital title. She had two younger siblings; Nadejda, who married George Mountbatten, 2nd Marquess of Milford Haven, and Michael.

In 1900, the family moved to England, leasing Keele Hall in Staffordshire, and later Kenwood House in Hampstead in 1910. The family also spent part of the year in Cannes.

== Marriage and family ==
On 20 July 1917, Zia married Harold Augustus Wernher, second son of wealthy financier Sir Julius Wernher, 1st Bt, who had made his fortune in South African diamond mining. The couple were married first in a Russian Orthodox ceremony in the chapel of the Russian Embassy in Welbeck Street then in an Anglican ceremony in the Chapel Royal at St James's Palace attended by King George V and Queen Mary. In September of that year, the King issued a Royal Warrant of Precedence granting Zia the style, title, place, pre-eminence and precedence as the daughter of an earl. From then she was known as Lady Anastasia Mikhailovna Wernher or more commonly Lady Zia Wernher.

Having already inherited his family fortune and seat, Luton Hoo, Harold inherited the Wernher Baronetcy upon the death of his brother, Derrick, in 1948. Zia's father lost much of his fortune in the Russian Revolution and had to be financially supported by his wealthy son-in-law. Their other homes included Thorpe Lubenham Hall in Northamptonshire, Someries House in Regent's Park and Downie Park in Angus, Scotland.

Zia and her husband had three children:

- George Michael Alexander Wernher (22 August 1918 – 4 December 1942), a godson of King George V, killed in action in during World War II
- Georgina Wernher (17 October 1919 – 28 April 2011), married, firstly, Harold Phillips, had issue, secondly, Sir George Kennard, 3rd Bt, no issue
- Myra Alice Wernher (18 March 1925 – 29 July 2022), married Sir David Butter, had issue

Her descendants include the 7th Duke of Westminster and the heirs apparent to the dukedom of Abercorn and the earldom of Dalhousie.

== Later life ==
Lady Zia's racing colours

Lady Zia was a successful owner and breeder of thoroughbred racehorses, and she was Champion Owner in 1955 and 1966. The best horses to run in her colours included Precipitation, Persian Gulf, Meld, who won the Filly Triple Crown in 1955, and Charlottown, who won the Epsom Derby in 1966. The family owned Someries Stud in Newmarket and Blackhall Stud in County Kildare.

During World War II, she was County President of the St John Ambulance Brigade of Leicestershire. During the war, her son was killed in action while serving with the 17th/21st Lancers on the Tunisian campaign. Their London home, Someries House, was damaged in the Blitz and subsequently demolished. The site is today home to the headquarters of the Royal College of Physicians.

For her services with the St John Ambulance, she was made an Officer of the Most Excellent Order of the British Empire (OBE) in the 1946 New Year Honours. She was promoted to a Commander (CBE) in the 1956 New Year Honours for political and public service in Bedfordshire.

The Wernhers were lifelong friends of the royal family, sharing both ancestry and a passion for horseracing. Zia and her husband were regarded as "honorary aunt and uncle" to Prince Philip of Greece and Denmark, later Duke of Edinburgh, who was the nephew and ward of their brother-in-law, the Marquess of Milford Haven. Queen Elizabeth II and Prince Philip would often spend their wedding anniversary at Luton Hoo. In the autumn of 1977, Zia realized she would not be strong enough to host the royal couple for their 30th anniversary. She made the arrangements and left it to her grandson and his wife to host. She died weeks later on 6 December 1977 at the age of 85 at 15 Grosvenor Square. Her funeral was held on 10 December at St Mary's Church, Luton. She was interred in the Wernher Mausoleum in Holy Trinity Churchyard, East Hyde, Bedfordshire.

Lady Zia Wernher School in Luton is named after her.

== Ancestry ==
Ancestors of Anastasia de Torby

8. Nicholas I of Russia
4. Grand Duke Michael Nikolaevich of Russia
9. Princess Charlotte of Prussia
2. Grand Duke Michael Mikhailovich of Russia
10. Leopold, Grand Duke of Baden
5. Princess Cecilie of Baden
11. Princess Sophie of Sweden
1. Countess Anastasia Mikhailovna de Torby
12. William, Duke of Nassau
6. Prince Nikolaus Wilhelm of Nassau
13. Princess Pauline of Württemberg
3. Countess Sophie Nikolaevna of Merenberg
14. Alexander Sergeyevich Pushkin
7. Natalia Alexandrovna Pushkina
15. Natalia Nikolaevna Goncharova

== Bibliography ==
- Alexander, Grand Duke of Russia, Once a Grand Duke, Cassell, London, 1932.
- Chavchavadze, David, The Grand Dukes, Atlantic, 1989; ISBN 0-938311-11-5
- Crawford Rosemary and Donald, Michael and Natasha, Phoenix, 1998; ISBN 0-380-73191-6
- Montgomery-Massingberd, Hugh (editor), Burke's Guide to the Royal Family, Burke's Peerage, London, 1973; ISBN 0-220-66222-3
