= Hugh Grosvenor, 7th Duke of Westminster =

British aristocrat (born 1991)

His Grace The Duke of Westminster DL
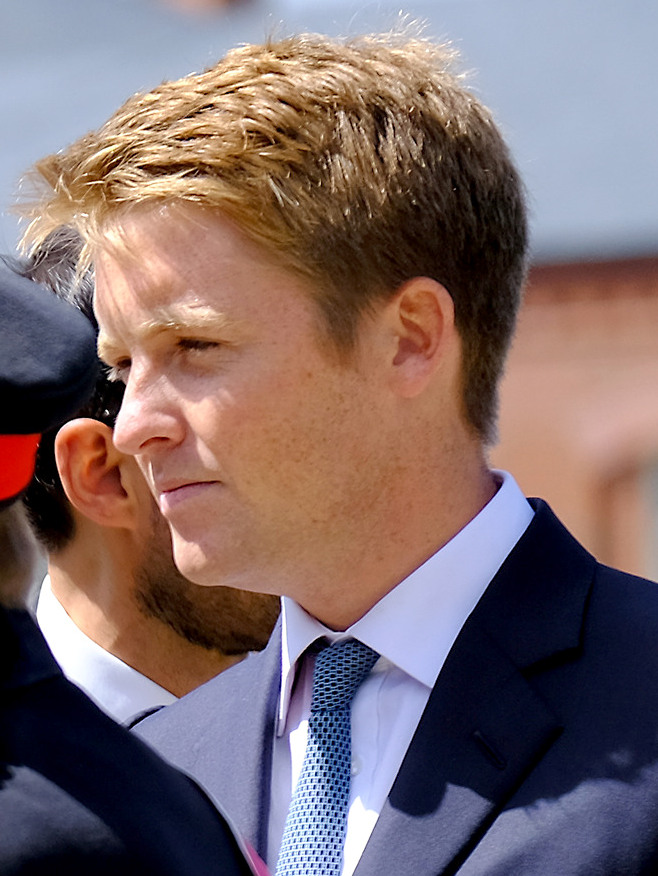
- Grosvenor in 2018
- Born: Hugh Richard Louis Grosvenor; 29 January 1991 (age 35); London, England
- Education: Mostyn House School; Ellesmere College; Newcastle University (BSc)
- Occupations: Landowner; businessman
- Spouse: Olivia Henson (m. 2024)
- Children: 1
- Parents: Gerald Grosvenor, 6th Duke of Westminster; Natalia Phillips

Hugh Richard Louis Grosvenor, 7th Duke of Westminster, DL (born 29 January 1991), is a British aristocrat and inherited trust manager. He inherited his title and control of the Grosvenor Estate from his father in 2016, then worth an estimated £9 billion, making him one of the wealthiest men in Britain. In 2025, Bloomberg estimated that he had a net worth of approximately £9.56 billion. In 2025, he ranked 14th on the Sunday Times Rich List 2025 with an estimated fortune of £9.884 billion.

== Early life and education ==
Hugh Richard Louis Grosvenor was born on 29 January 1991 in London, England, the third child and only son of Gerald Grosvenor, 6th Duke of Westminster, and his wife Natalia (née Phillips). His baptism on 23 June 1991 was attended by Charles, Prince of Wales (later King Charles III), who was named one of his godparents. He was styled as Earl Grosvenor from his birth until 2016, when his father died and he became the 7th Duke.

Through his mother, Grosvenor descends from the Russian Imperial House of Romanov, specifically from Nicholas I of Russia, and also from the writer Alexander Pushkin and his wife Natalia Nikolayevna Goncharova. His paternal first cousins are Charles Innes-Ker, 11th Duke of Roxburghe, and Thomas Anson, 6th Earl of Lichfield, while his maternal first cousin is James Hamilton, Marquess of Hamilton, eldest son and heir-apparent of James Hamilton, 5th Duke of Abercorn.

He was raised at the family seat, Eaton Hall in Cheshire, with his three sisters: Lady Tamara, Lady Edwina, and Lady Viola. They attended a local public primary school. Afterwards, he attended the small private Mostyn House School, followed by Ellesmere College in Shropshire. He studied at Newcastle University, graduating with a Bachelor of Science degree in Countryside Management.

Grosvenor is a close friend of William, Prince of Wales, and Prince Harry, Duke of Sussex. He is the godfather of Prince George of Wales and Prince Archie of Sussex.

== Career ==
After graduating, Grosvenor worked in estate management at Wheatsheaf Group, a food and agriculture investment business based on the Eaton estate and owned by the Grosvenor Group. He then became an account manager at Bio-bean, a sustainability company that turns coffee waste into bioproducts, such as logs and biofuel.

Upon his father's death in August 2016, he inherited the titles and share in the fortune then estimated at £9 billion, with considerable trust funds going to his sisters. This wealth is held in a trust of which the 7th Duke is a beneficial owner and chair of trustees but not the legal owner – an arrangement that received considerable media attention owing to the inheritance tax exemption it confers. Grosvenor is Chair of Grosvenor Group, a real-estate development and investment company with a portfolio of urban and rural properties in Europe, Asia, and North America, and investments in food and agricultural technology companies. His land holdings include the 39,000-hectare Reay Forest Estate in Sutherland, Scotland.

Grosvenor was one of the peers carrying the Royal Standards at the coronation of Charles III and Camilla. He was appointed a deputy lieutenant of Cheshire on 9 June 2023.

In 2026, The Times reported that a coalition of 13 investors and industry organisations – including the property company owned by Grosvenor – sent a private letter to Chancellor of the Exchequer Rachel Reeves arguing that plans to retrospectively cap ground rents on existing leasehold properties would significantly reduce the value of freehold investments, discourage institutional investment, undermine pension-fund returns, weaken mortgage lending, reduce housing development, and potentially expose the government to legal claims for compensation.

== Marriage and issue ==
In April 2023, Grosvenor's engagement to Olivia Grace Henson (born 1992) was announced. Henson attended Marlborough College alongside Princess Eugenie and is the daughter of Rupert Cornelius Brooke Henson (born 1962) and Caroline Belinda Frisby (born 1963), whose great-grandmother was Lady Geraldine Mariana Hoare née Hervey (died 1955), a great-granddaughter of the 5th Duke of Rutland.

The couple married on 7 June 2024 at Chester Cathedral. Prince William served as an usher at the wedding. Guests included Princess Eugenie and Leonora, Countess of Lichfield. The service was officiated by Tim Stratford, Dean of Chester, and the sermon was given by Mark Tanner, Bishop of Chester. Following the service, two supporters of Just Stop Oil projected powder paint near the cathedral's entrance as the newlyweds made their way to a car.

On 27 July 2025, their first child, a daughter, Lady Cosima Florence Grosvenor, was born. Prince William is Cosima's godfather.

== Philanthropy ==
Grosvenor is the chair of trustees of the Westminster Foundation, a grant-making foundation that seeks to provide opportunities for young people (aged 0 to 25) and their families living in Westminster, Chester, and rural areas.

He supports the Defence and National Rehabilitation Centre, established by his father to help wounded British military veterans.

In 2020, during the COVID-19 pandemic, he donated £12.5 million to the national COVID relief effort and to support the NHS, and £1 million to the University of Oxford to fund research projects on mental health and psychology.

In April 2025, Grosvenor and his wife visited the University of Chester's Queen's Park campus in Handbridge as part of a charitable engagement, where they toured facilities including simulation and virtual reality suites. The university's vice-chancellor, Professor Eunice Simmons, welcomed the couple and highlighted the visit as an opportunity to showcase the institution's resources.

In July 2026, he and his wife joined the Mayor of London, Sadiq Khan, to open the renovated Grosvenor Square in Mayfair, London. The event marked the completion of a £25 million renovation of the square, part of the Grosvenor Group's London property holdings, which added 150,000 plants and bulbs, 44 trees, and two wetland areas. Grosvenor cut a ribbon to mark the opening, and the square was scheduled to reopen to the public on 20 July 2026.

== Arms ==
Coat of arms of Hugh Grosvenor, 7th Duke of Westminster
Notes The dukedom of Westminster was created by Queen Victoria in 1874. Coronet That of a Duke. Crest A Talbot statant Or Escutcheon Quarterly: 1st and 4th, Azure a Portcullis with chains pendant Or on a Chief of the last between two united Roses of York and Lancaster a Pale charged with the Arms of King Edward the Confessor (City of Westminster); 2 and 3rd, Azure a Garb Or (Grosvenor) Supporters On either side a Talbot reguardant Or collared Azure Motto Virtus Non Stemma (Virtue not ancestry)

Hugh Grosvenor, 7th Duke of Westminster Born: 29 January 1991
Peerage of the United Kingdom
Preceded by Gerald Grosvenor	Duke of Westminster; 2016–present	Incumbent
Orders of precedence in the United Kingdom
Preceded by The Duke of Abercorn	Gentlemen; The Duke of Westminster	Succeeded by The Duke of Fife
Lines of succession
Preceded by Natalia Grosvenor, Dowager Duchess of Westminster	Line of succession to the British throne descendant of Princess Augusta of Great Britain, granddaughter of George II	Succeeded by Lady Cosima Grosvenor
