= Thorpe Lubenham =

Former civil parish in Northamptonshire, England

Coordinates: 52.47459°N 0.96349°W

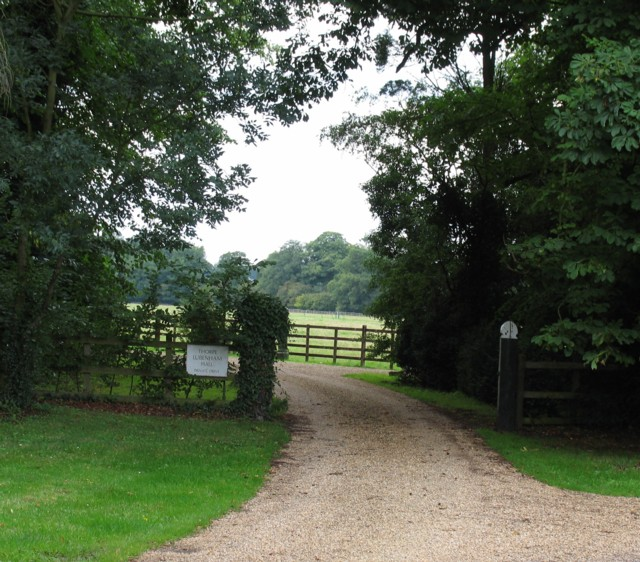
- Entrance to Thorpe Lubenham Hall

- Location within Northamptonshire
- Civil parish: Marston Trussell
- Unitary authority: West Northamptonshire
- Ceremonial county: Northamptonshire
- Region: East Midlands
- Country: England
- Sovereign state: United Kingdom

Thorpe Lubenham is a deserted settlement and former civil parish, now in the parish of Marston Trussell, in the West Northamptonshire district, in the ceremonial county of Northamptonshire, England. In 1931 the parish had a population of 33.

Thorpe Lubenham lies to the south of the Leicestershire village of Lubenham and south of the River Welland which forms the county boundary.

Thorpe Lubenham was formerly an extra-parochial tract, from 1858 Thorpe Lubenham was a civil parish in its own right until it was abolished on 1 April 1935, and merged with Marston Trussell.

== See also ==
- List of lost settlements in Northamptonshire
