= George Kennard =

English soldier and author (1915–1999)

Lieutenant Colonel Sir George Kennard Bt
- Born: 27 April 1915
- Died: 13 December 1999 (aged 84)
- Education: Eton College
- Spouses: Cecilia Violet Maunsell (m. 1940–1958) Mollie Jessie Rudd Miskin (m. 1958): Nichola Carew; Georgina Phillips (m. 1992)
- Father: Sir Coleridge Kennard, 1st Baronet
- Military career
- Branch: British Army
- Rank: Lieutenant Colonel
- Unit: 4th Queen's Own Hussars
- Conflicts: World War II

Lieutenant Colonel Sir George Arnold Ford Kennard, 3rd Baronet (27 April 1915 – 13 December 1999) was an English soldier and author. He served in the 4th Queen's Own Hussars. His autobiography, Loopy, was published in 1990.

== Life ==
He was a younger son of Sir Coleridge Arthur Fitzroy Kennard, 1st Baronet, and educated at Eton College. The title eventually passed to Sir George upon the death of his childless brother, Sir Lawrence in 1967.

A regular officer of the 4th Hussars, Kennard was captured during World War II.

The 4th Queen's Own Hussars was posted to Greece in February 1941 to take part in the defence of that country with the Axis invasion. In Greece they served with the 1st Armoured Brigade and were attached to the 6th Australian Infantry Division, and it was when acting as the rearguard during the Corinth Canal Bridge action on the 2nd May 1941 that the 4th Hussars were overrun and forced to surrender.

After being made a prisoner of war he was sent to camp in Germany, where he was a prisoner of war until March 1945 when, with a companion, they successfully slipped away from the column of prisoners that the Germans were marching west and eventually encountered United States Army troops who liberated him.

== Family ==
Kennard was married four times:

- Firstly, in 1940, to Cecilia Violet Maunsell, only daughter of Cecil John Cokayne Maunsell, and Wilhelmine Violet Eileen FitzClarence (granddaughter of the 2nd Earl of Munster); they had one daughter, and the marriage was dissolved in 1958.
- Secondly, in 1958, to Mollie Jessie Rudd Miskin, daughter of Hugh Wyllie.
- His third wife was Nichola Carew.
- His fourth wife and widow is Georgina Phillips.

The baronetcy became extinct upon his death.

Baronetage of the United Kingdom
Preceded by Lawrence Kennard	Baronet (of Fernhill); 1967–1999	Extinct
