= Grand Duke Michael Mikhailovich of Russia =

Grand Duke of Russia

Grand Duke Michael Mikhailovich
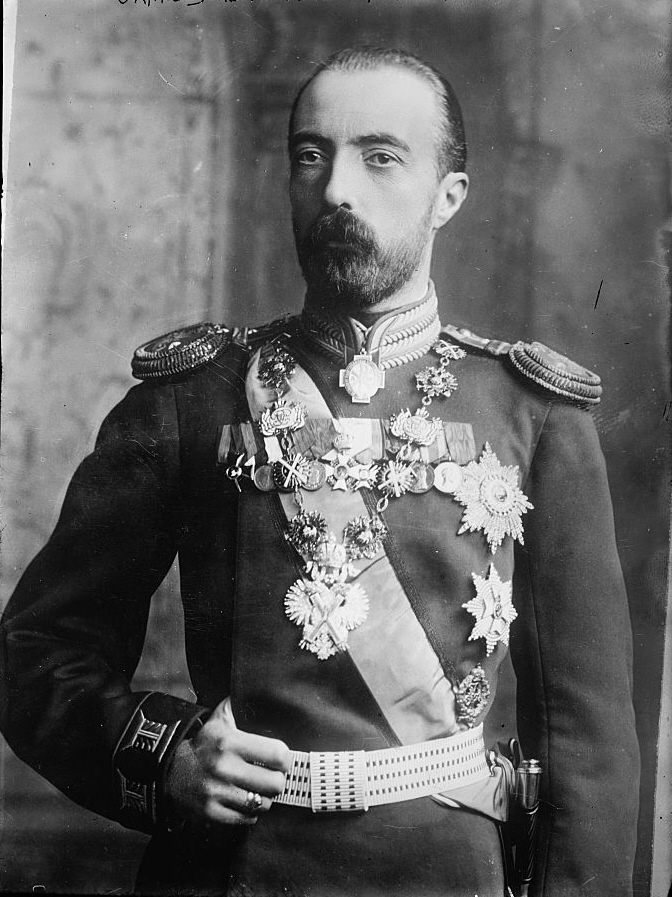
- Michael in 1910
- Born: 16 October 1861; Peterhof Palace, St. Petersburg, Russian Empire
- Died: 26 April 1929 (aged 67); London, England, UK
- Spouse: Countess Sophie of Merenberg (m. 1891; died 1927)
- Issue: Anastasia Mikhailovna, Lady Wernher; Nadejda Mikhailovna Mountbatten, Marchioness of Milford Haven; Count Michael Mikhailovich of Torby
- House: Holstein-Gottorp-Romanov
- Father: Grand Duke Michael Nikolaevich of Russia
- Mother: Princess Cecilie of Baden

Grand Duke Michael Mikhailovich of Russia (Russian: Михаил Михайлович; 16 October 1861 – 26 April 1929) was a son of Grand Duke Michael Nicolaievich of Russia and a grandson of Tsar Nicholas I of Russia.

He was raised in the Caucasus, where he lived between 1862 and 1881 with his family, and was educated by private tutors. As Romanov tradition demanded, he follow a military career. He served in the Russo-Turkish War in 1877, became a Colonel and was adjutant at the Imperial court. In 1891 he contracted a morganatic marriage with Countess Sophie von Merenberg, a morganatic daughter of Prince Nicholas William of Nassau and a granddaughter of the Russian poet Alexander Pushkin. For contracting this marriage without permission, Emperor Alexander III of Russia stripped him of his military titles and banished the couple from the Russian Empire.

For some years he lived in Wiesbaden, Nassau and in Cannes. He settled permanently in England in 1900, leasing Keele Hall in Staffordshire and later Kenwood House on the outskirts of London. He became a prominent member of British society, one of his daughters marrying into the British aristocracy and another marrying a great-grandson of Queen Victoria. He lost his fortune with the fall of the Russian monarchy in 1918. Three of his brothers were killed by the Bolsheviks, but he escaped the Russian Revolution because he was living abroad. He spent his last years living under reduced circumstances with the financial help of his son-in-law, Sir Harold Wernher.

== Early life ==
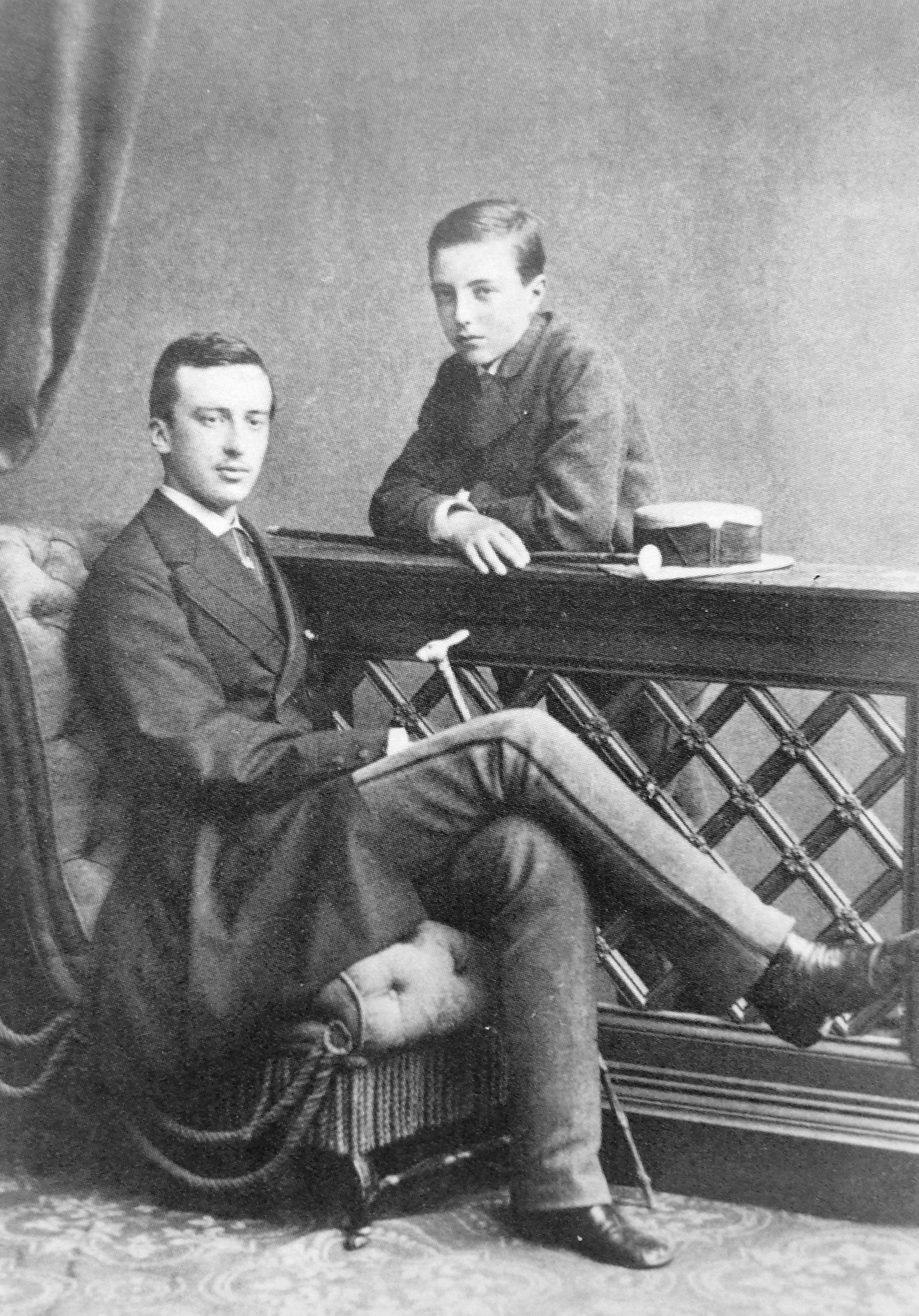
Grand Duke Michael (on the right) with his eldest brother Nicholas, Baden, 1876.

Grand Duke Michael Mikhailovich was born at Peterhof Palace in St. Petersburg on 16 October [O.S. 4 October] 1861, the third child and second son of the seven children of Grand Duke Michael Nicolaievich of Russia and his wife, Grand Duchess Olga Feodorovna (born Princess Cecile of Baden).

Known in the family as Miche-Miche, he was a year old when, in 1862, the family moved to Tiflis, Georgia, on the occasion of his father's being named Viceroy of the Caucasus. Grand Duke Michael spent his youth in the Caucasus, where his family lived for twenty years. He had a spartan upbringing that included sleeping on army cots and taking cold baths. He was educated at home by private tutors. The relationship with his parents was troublesome. His father, occupied in military and governmental endeavours, remained a distant figure. His demanding mother was a strict disciplinarian who did not show affection towards her children. He was a disappointment to his mother, who compared him unfavourably with his more intelligent eldest brother, Grand Duke Nicholas. Michael was considered the least gifted of the seven children and his mother referred to him as "stupid".

Nevertheless, in 1881, he had "a great flirtation" with Princess Victoria of Hesse and by Rhine (1863-1950), who was known for her intelligence. Later, his daughter Nada would marry her son George.

During the years in the Caucasus, the Grand Duke excelled at horsemanship and started his military career. As a young man, he served in the Russo-Turkish War and became a colonel. He loved the military life and served in the Egersky (Chasseurs) Regiment of the guards. In 1882, when Grand Duke Michael was twenty years old, he returned with his family to St. Petersburg upon his father's appointment as chairman of the State Council. Michael was shallow and not particularly bright, but he was tall and handsome. He became popular on the social circuit in the capital, spending a great deal of his time on endless parties, dancing and gambling. Tsar Alexander III referred to him as a 'fool'.

== Marriage ==
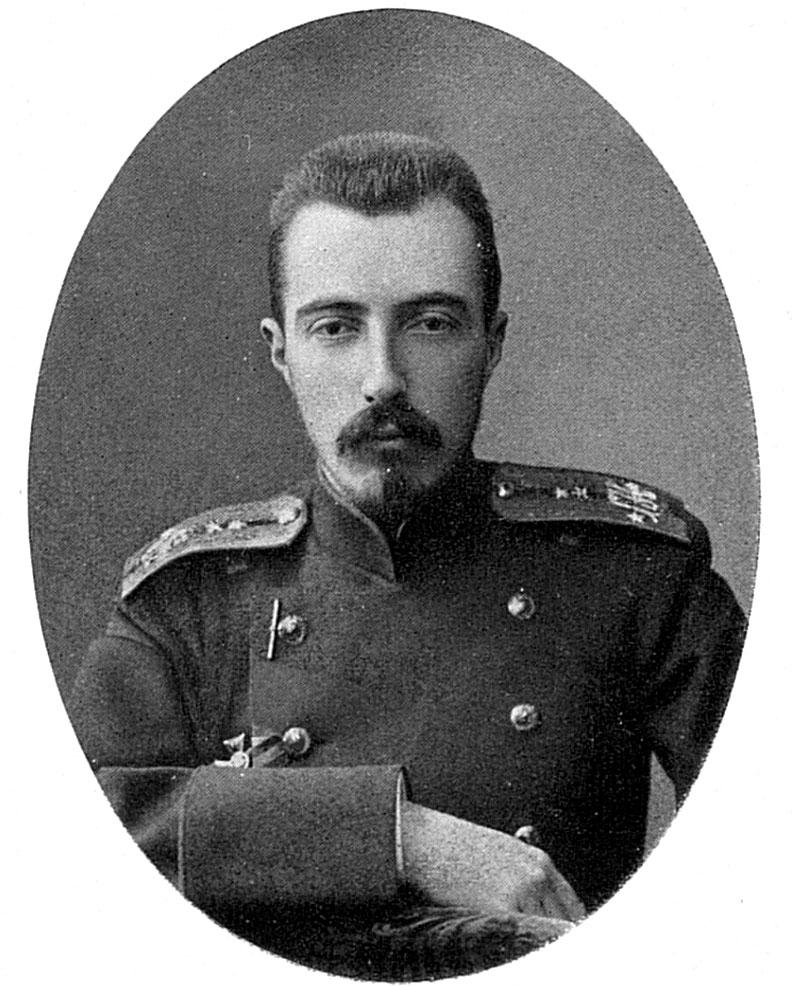
Grand Duke Michael Mikhailovich of Russia in his youth.

Grand Duke Michael lived in St. Petersburg's Mikhailovsky Palace with his parents, but he intended to marry soon, and to house his expected family, he ordered the construction of a large residence in the imperial capital. The palace was built between 1885 and 1891. It was designed by architect Maximilian Messmacher in Neo-Renaissance-style with its front entrance on the Admiralty Embankment 8. The building was innovative for the end of the 19th century, having gas pipelines, electricity and a telephone. However, the grand duke was not destined to live there. By the time the palace was finished Grand Duke Michael had gone into exile from Russia.

In the spring of 1886 the grand duke was in London in search of a wife. He made unsuccessful overtures for the hand of Princess Mary of Teck. While Mary's grandmother, the Duchess of Cambridge, was in favour of the marriage, both the Duke of Cambridge and Mary's father, the Duke of Teck were against it, considering the Romanovs to be "notoriously bad husbands".

The same year Grand Duke Michael Mikhailovich proposed marriage to Princess Irene of Hesse and by Rhine. But she was in love with her first cousin, Prince Henry of Prussia, she rejected him. In 1887 he proposed to Princess Louise, the eldest daughter of the Prince of Wales. He admitted to Louise that he could never love her and he was turned down for a third time.

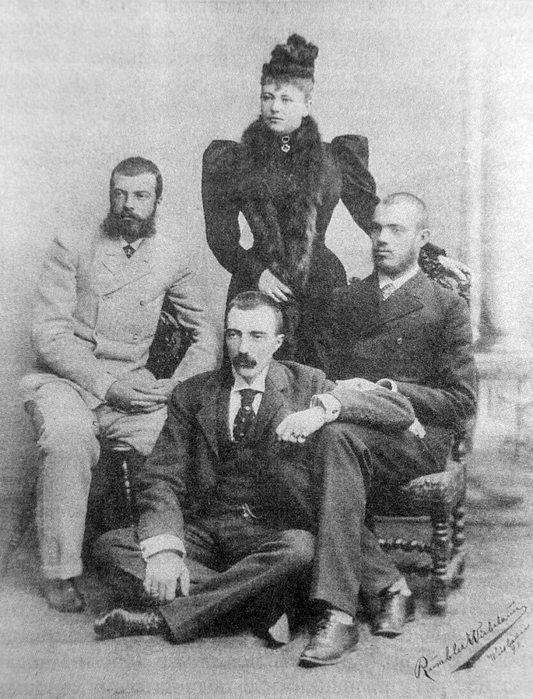
Grand Duke Michael, Countess Sofia, Grand Duke Alexander (left) and Grand Duke Sergei (right). c1892.

After that, he attempted to marry within the Russian nobility, which caused confrontations with his parents. In 1888, he had an affair with Princess Walewska. Later, he fell in love with Countess Catherine Nikolaevna Ignatieva (1869–1914), the daughter of the former Minister of Interior, Nicholas Pavlovich Ignatiev. He tried to get permission to marry her and he went with his father to talk to Tsar Alexander III. However, his mother and the Empress Maria Feodorovna made it impossible for him to marry Catherine. Olga Feodorovna opposed the misalliance vehemently. "He has so openly provoked me" she wrote of her son, mentioning his "lack of respect, affection and attention". To break off the relationship, the parents decided to send him abroad.

While in Nice, in 1891, Grand Duke Michael Mikhailovich fell in love with Countess Sophie von Merenberg, his third cousin once removed, daughter of Prince Nikolaus Wilhelm of Nassau and his morganatic wife, née Natalia Alexandrovna Pushkina, a member of the minor Russian nobility. Sophie's maternal grandfather was the renowned poet-author Alexander Pushkin; through him, she had black African ancestry (one part in 32) as a direct descendant of Peter the Great's protégé, Abram Petrovich Gannibal. The grand duke met Sophie when he saved her from a horse that had run away with her. He did not bother to ask for the necessary permission for the marriage from the Tsar or his parents because he knew it would not be granted. They were married in San Remo on 26 February 1891.

The marriage was not only morganatic but also illegal (3rd cousins) under the Imperial house laws and caused a scandal at the Russian court, despite the bride's dynastic paternal ancestry. Grand Duke Michael Mikhailovich was deprived of his military rank and of his position as adjutant at the Imperial Court. He was also forbidden to return to Russia for life. When his mother heard of his morganatic marriage, she collapsed with shock and went by train to the Crimea to recover, but then had a heart attack and died, for which Michael was blamed. He was not allowed to attend his mother's funeral.

== Exile ==
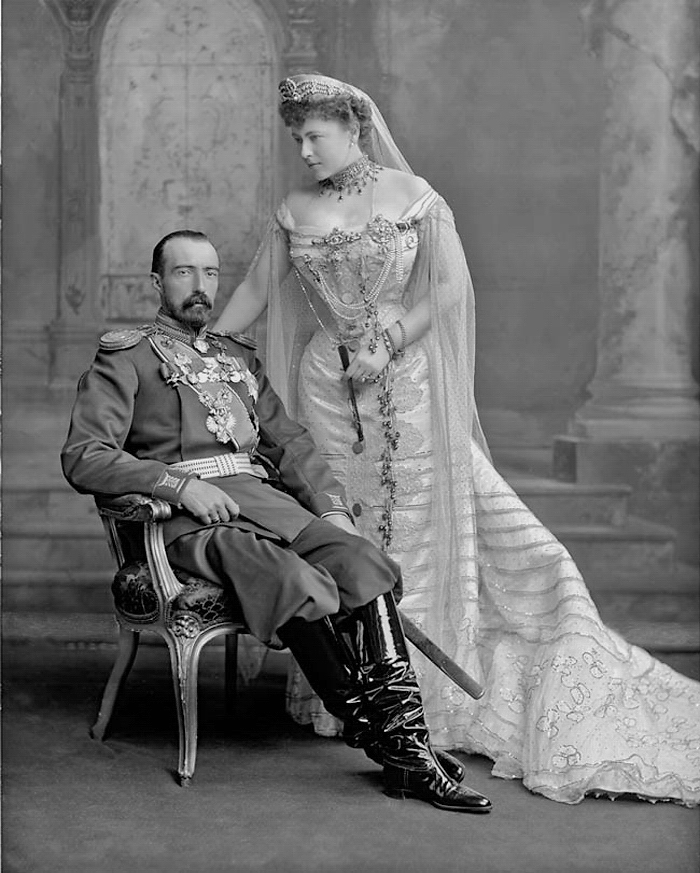
Grand Duke Michael Mikhailovich of Russia and his wife Countess Sophie de Torby. Photograph by Lafayette Studio, London, 1902. The grand duke and his wife are seen here in Russian court dress – the costumes they wore to the coronation of Edward VII two days earlier.

Because of his morganatic marriage, Grand Duke Michael would spend the rest of his life living in exile in England, France and Germany. His wife was granted the title of Countess de Torby by her uncle Adolphe, Grand Duke of Luxembourg. The couple initially lived in Wiesbaden, where Sophie's ancestors once reigned. Two of their three children were born there. In 1899, they settled more permanently in Cannes where they had a villa, named Kazbek, after a mountain in Georgia. They lived comfortably: Five footmen, a butler, a valet, a lady's maid, a governess, a nursery maid and six chefs attended them. Michael afforded this lifestyle as owner of a factory near Borjomi (Georgia) that bottled mineral water. Grand Duke Michael was involved in the construction of the St. Michael the Archangel Church in Cannes and in laying the cornerstones for hotels and casinos in the area. He was an excellent golfer and hosted parties with his wife. They became prominent figures in the international set in the French Riviera, where the grand duke came to be known as the "Uncrowned King of Cannes".

The family maintained their contacts in British society, appearing in Country Life magazine in 1899. In 1900, the grand duke began renting Keele Hall, a stately home in Staffordshire, a few miles from Newcastle-under-Lyme. During the ten years he lived there, he entered country society. Michael was very pleased when the town council of Newcastle-under-Lyme in late 1902 conferred on him the distinction of Lord High Steward of the borough. In 1903 he unveiled a statue of Queen Victoria in Newcastle-under-Lyme. The statue (with inscription to him) now stands in the Queen's Gardens by the Ironmarket. He was also a frequent visitor to North Berwick, a seaside resort in Scotland. In July 1901, Edward VII appointed him an Honorary Knight Grand Cross of the Royal Victorian Order (GCVO), the house order of the royal family.

Part of the year was spent at his villa in the south of France. The grand duke was the founder and president of the Cannes Golf Club, where he often played during the winter season. In the south of France, he usually met his relatives, particularly his sister Anastasia who owned a villa nearby. In 1903, Michael's father had a stroke and was moved to Cannes. The old grand duke was charmed by his daughter-in-law and his Torby grandchildren. The presence of Michael's father also frequently brought Michael's brother Alexander and his family to Cannes, and these were later followed by other grand dukes. He socialised there with other royalty who also stayed at the Riviera. Grand Duke Michael helped finance the Carlton Hotel in Cannes.

During the Russo-Japanese War, Michael Mikhailovich organised a hospital for wounded Russian officers. It was around this time that he shaved off his beard and stopped dyeing his hair. He was described as a born autocrat, single-minded, and a stickler for protocol.

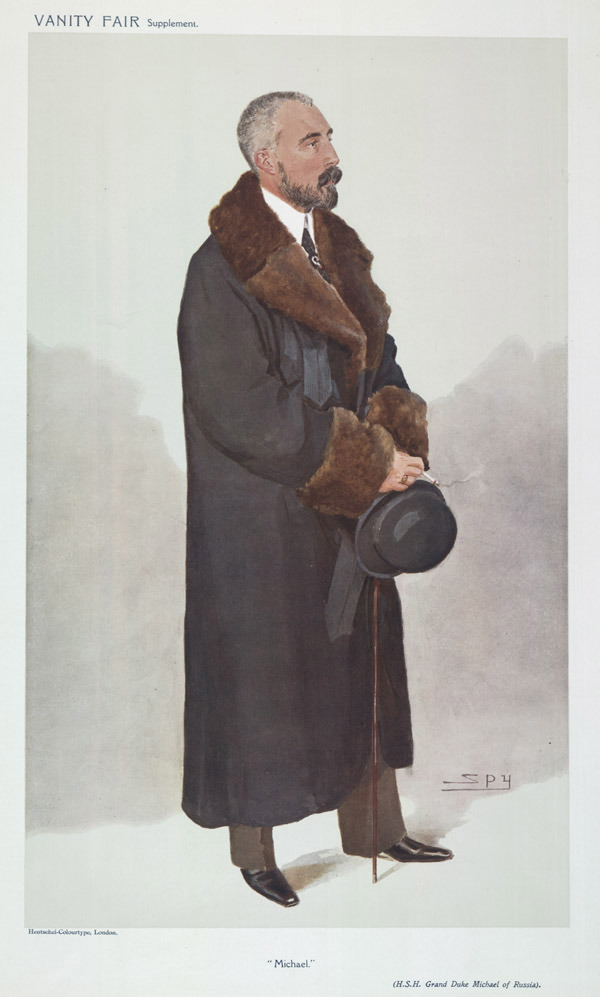
Mikhailovich caricatured by Sky for Vanity Fair, 1908

In 1908, Michael published a novel, Never Say Die, about a morganatic marriage, written in resentment at not being allowed back into Russia. In the preface he wrote: "Belonging, as I do, to the Imperial Blood, and being a member of one of the reigning houses, I should like to prove to the world how wrong it is in thinking – as the majority of mankind is apt to do – that we are the happiest beings on this earth. There is no doubt that we are well situated, but is wealth the only happiness in the world?" While remaining "devoted" to Sophie, Michael nevertheless often fell in love with pretty girls.

At the death of his father in Cannes on 18 December 1909, Michael was allowed to come to Russia for the funeral; however, his wife refused to go with him as she still resented the insults which had marred their marriage so many years before.

After leaving Keele, the grand duke moved with his family to Hampstead in 1909, taking a long lease on Kenwood House, a house owned by the Earl of Mansfield, overlooking London's Hampstead Heath. Michael became president of the Hampstead General Hospital, to which he donated an ambulance, as well as president of the Hampstead Art Society. They lived in splendour, enjoying a privileged place in British society. Every year Grand Duke Michael and his wife would visit Edward VII at Windsor Castle or Sandringham and attend luncheons at Buckingham Palace.

After the death of Edward VII, Grand Duke Michael, pushed by his wife, tried in vain to obtain a British title for her. In 1912, George V wrote to Nicholas II about "that good fool Michael, who I am sure bores you with as many grievances as he does me." Nicholas had written to George to tell him that Grand Duke Michael had asked his permission for his wife to accept a British title and that he had given consent, subject of course to George's agreement. In his reply George pointed out "I have not the power to grant a title in England to a foreign subject and still more impossible in the case of a Russian Grand Duke." Gloomily accepting that the grand duke would be turning up to make a formal request for his wife's title, George added that "I do not look forward to our interview with any pleasure, as I fear I have no alternative but to refuse his request".

Not only did they not secure a title for Sophie, but the couple's position in British society was threatened when in the same year Grand Duke Michael Alexandrovich of Russia, Nicholas II's younger brother, chose England for his exile after also contracting a morganatic marriage. The arrival in England of another and more senior grand duke, Michael Alexandrovich, provided an uncomfortable reminder of the scandal which had once attached to Michael Mikahilovich and his wife. As a result, they never received the newcomers at Kenwood. Their refusal to open their doors to the couple meant that many others in British society followed suit, with the result that Grand Duke Michael Alexandrovich and his wife were effectively marginalized.

In September 1912, Grand Duke Michael was allowed to visit Russia for the centennial of the Battle of Borodino, and was restored to the honorary colonelcy of the 49th Brest Regiment.

== Last years ==
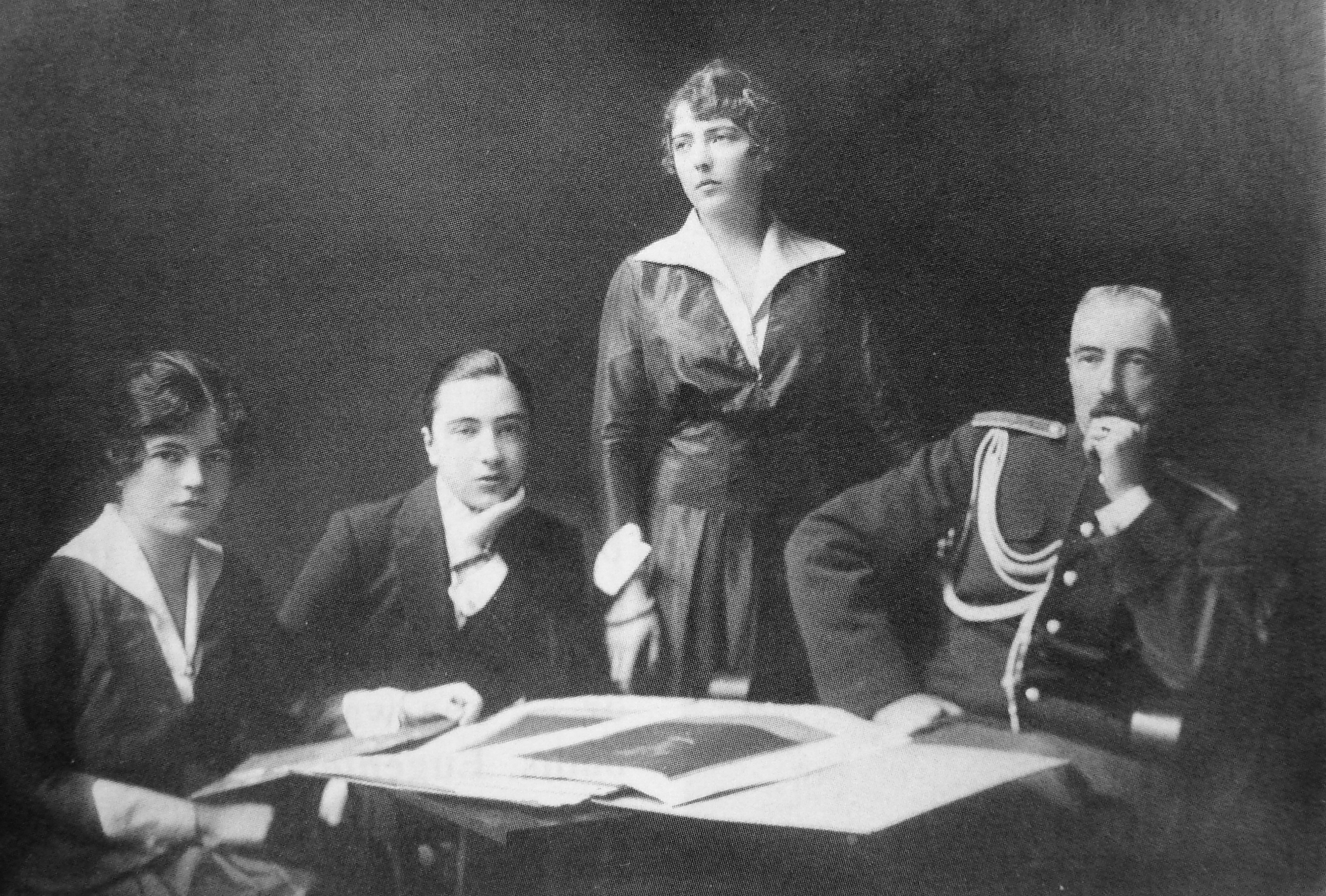
Grand Duke Michael Mikhailovich of Russia (right) with his children (from left to right), Nadejda, Michael and Anastasia de Torby

During World War I, Michael was made a chairman of the commission to consolidate Russian orders abroad, but was denied permission to come back to Russia and serve with its armed forces. Trying to help his country, he acted as an agent for Russian loans in France. On 31 October 1916, the grand duke wrote to Tsar Nicholas II warning him that British secret agents in Russia were expecting a revolution, and that he should satisfy the people's just demands before it was too late. Excerpts of Michael's correspondence in French with the Emperor during his exile have been published (usually beseeching the tsar for money).

With the war over, and following the Russian revolution, the grand duke's financial situation deteriorated. He lost a good deal of his money, which was tied up in the Romanovs' fortunes. He had to move to a more modest house at 3 Cambridge Gate, Regent's Park. However, George V and Queen Mary helped with £10,000.

In 1916 his younger daughter, Nadejda (Nada) married Prince George of Battenberg, older son of Prince Louis by Queen Victoria's granddaughter, Princess Victoria of Hesse-Darmstadt. The Battenberg family was itself the product of a morganatic marriage, but one whose members had been allowed to use the style His/Her Serene Highness. A year after Nadeja and George's wedding, however, the English branches of the Battenberg family gave up their princely title, and Prince George, who was eventually to become 2nd Marquess of Milford Haven, took the surname Mountbatten and bore the courtesy title of earl, his wife becoming known as Countess of Medina.

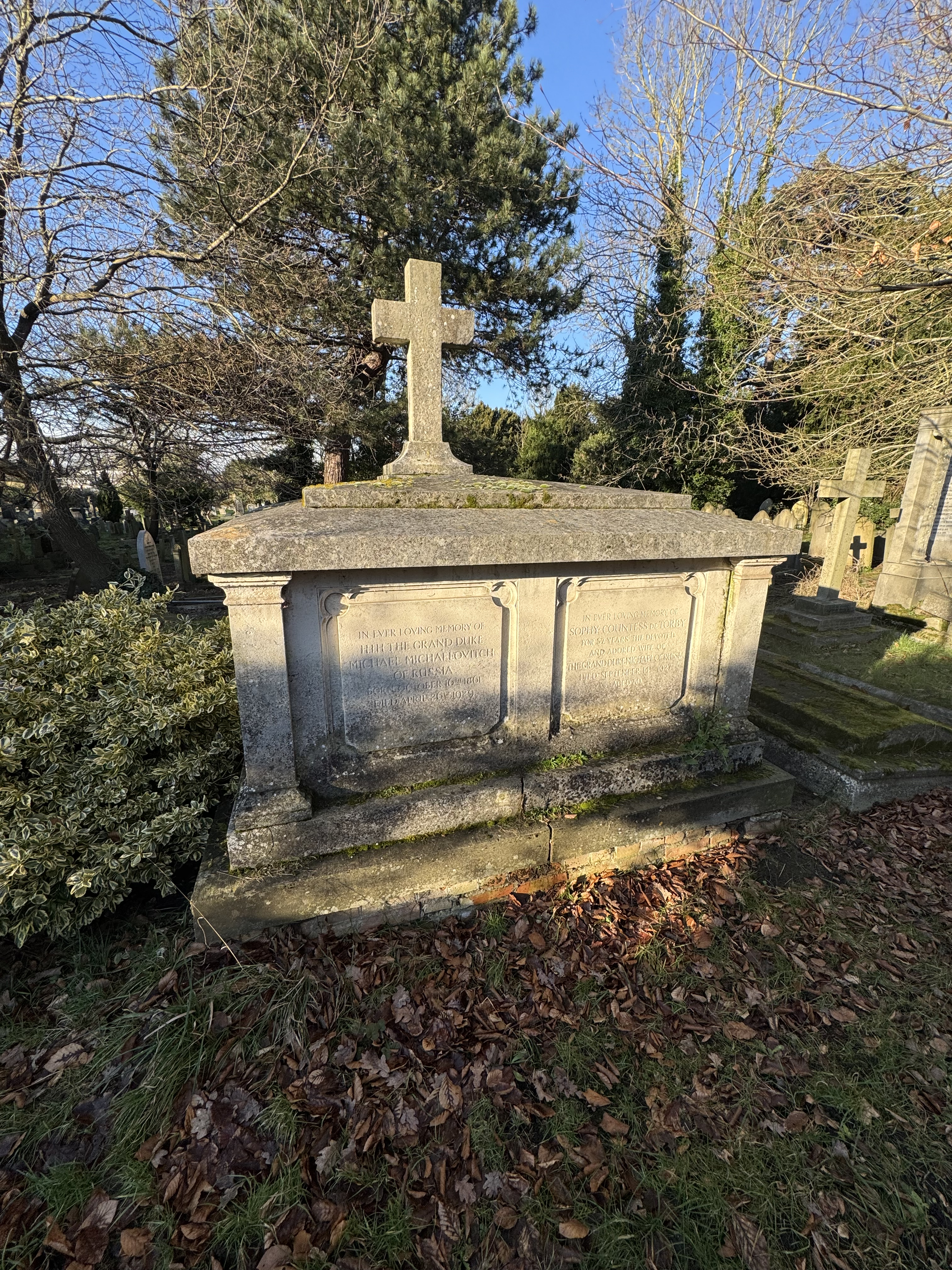
Grand Duke Michael Mikhailovich and his wife's grave at Hampstead Cemetery (2025).

Anastasia (Zia), the older daughter, in 1917 married Sir Harold Wernher, yielding her own comital title to accept the style and rank of an earl's daughter. Wernher, being extremely wealthy, provided substantial financial support for his in-laws, alleviating the loss of income from Michael's imperial estates.

The grand duke's son, Michael, Count de Torby (known familially as Boy Torby), lost his employment and came to live with them, but the relationship was difficult, not least because Boy suffered a recurring form of depression. Between bouts of this he was a painter of some accomplishment. Once the World War was over, Michael Mikhailovich and his wife returned to Cannes after six years. After the news of the murders of so many close relatives came through, many people thought Michael became unbalanced. He had become short-tempered and rude to the servants and a great trial to his wife.

By 1925, the grand duke had become so troublesome that his son-in-law, Harold, regarded him as "perfectly crazy". On 4 September 1927, his wife died, aged fifty-nine. King George V wrote a letter of condolence and the Prince of Wales attended her funeral. By November, according to Harold, the grand duke was again behaving well, as he no longer had his wife to argue with. He survived her for less than two years. Grand Duke Michael contracted influenza and died in London on 26 April 1929, aged sixty-seven. He was buried with his wife in Hampstead Cemetery.

== Children ==
Grand Duke Michael and the Countess de Torby had two daughters and one son.

- Anastasia de Torby (Zia) (9 September 1892 – 7 December 1977); married London 20 July 1917 Sir Harold Wernher, 3rd Bt (1893–1973). They had one son and two daughters. Today Zia's grandchildren include the Duchesses of Abercorn and Westminster, the Countess of Dalhousie, and Rohays, Princess Alexander Galitzine.
- Nadejda de Torby (Nada) (28 March 1896 – 22 January 1963); married London 15 November 1916 George, 2nd Marquess of Milford Haven, born Prince von Battenberg (1892–1938). They had one daughter Lady Tatiana Elizabeth Mountbatten, and one son David Mountbatten, 3rd Marquess of Milford Haven
- Michael Mikhailovich of Torby (Boy) (8 October 1898 – 8 May 1959), became a naturalised British subject in November 1938.

== Ancestry ==
Ancestors of Grand Duke Michael Mikhailovich of Russia

8. Paul I of Russia
4. Nicholas I of Russia
9. Sophie Dorothea of Württemberg
2. Grand Duke Michael Nicolaevich of Russia
10. Frederick William III of Prussia
5. Charlotte of Prussia
11. Louise of Mecklenburg-Strelitz
1. Grand Duke Michael Mikhailovich of Russia
12. Charles Frederick, Grand Duke of Baden
6. Leopold, Grand Duke of Baden
13. Luise Karoline Geyer von Geyersberg
3. Princess Cecilie of Baden
14. Gustav IV Adolf of Sweden
7. Sophie of Sweden
15. Frederica of Baden

== Bibliography ==
- Alexander, Grand Duke of Russia. Once a Grand Duke, Cassell, London, 1932.
- Chavchavadze, David. The Grand Dukes, Atlantic, 1989, ISBN 0-938311-11-5
- Cockfield, Jamie H. White Crow: The Life and Times of the Grand Duke Nicholas Mikhailovich Romanov: 1859–1919. Praeger. Westport, Conn., US. 2002. ISBN 0-275-97778-1
- Crawford Rosemary & Donald. Michael and Natasha, Phoenix, 1998. ISBN 0-380-73191-6
- King, Greg. The Court of the Last Tsar, Wiley, 2006, ISBN 978-0-471-72763-7.
- Montgomery-Massingberd, Hugh (editor), Burke's Guide to the Royal Family, Burke's Peerage, London, 1973, ISBN 0-220-66222-3
- Perry, John and Pleshakov, Constantine. The Flight of the Romanovs, Basic Books, 1999, ISBN 0-465-02462-9.
- Trevelyan, Raleigh. Grand Dukes and Diamonds: The Wernhers of Luton Hoo. Secker & Warburg, 1991. ISBN 0-436-53404-5.
- Wynn, Marion. Grand Duke Michael Mikhailovich Keel Hall and Kenwood . Royalty History Digest. Vol 11.
