= Avery =

Avery may refer to:

== Business ==
- Avery Company, a former tractor manufacturer and later produced trucks and automobiles
- Avery Weigh-Tronix, a British manufacturer of industrial weighing systems
- Avery Berkel, a British manufacturer of retail weighing systems
  - GEC Avery, a former British manufacturer of weighing machines (successor to W & T Avery)
  - W & T Avery, a former British manufacturer of weighing machines
- Avery Brewing Company, a regional brewery located in Boulder, Colorado
- Avery Dennison, a major manufacturer of pressure-sensitive adhesive materials, apparel branding labels and tags, RFID inlays, and specialty medical products
- Avery Publishing, an imprint of the Penguin Group

== People ==
- Avery (given name), including fictional characters
- Avery (surname)

== Places ==
=== United States ===
- Avery, California
- Avery, Idaho
- Avery, Indiana
- Avery, Iowa
- Avery, Michigan
- Avery, Missouri
- Avery, Crawford County, Missouri
- Avery, Nebraska
- Avery, Ohio
- Avery, Oklahoma
- Avery, Texas
- Avery Township, Michigan
- Avery County, North Carolina
- Avery Creek, North Carolina
- Avery Island, Louisiana

=== Outer space ===
- Avery (crater), a crater on the Moon
- 3580 Avery, an asteroid

== Other uses ==
- Avery (album), the 2015 debut album by Emtee
- Avery (restaurant), a restaurant in San Francisco

== See also ==
- Avery Weigh-Tronix, manufacturer of weighing scales
- Avery Berkel, the predecessor of Avery Weigh-Tronix
- W & T Avery Ltd., the predecessor of GEC-Avery
- W. Avery & Son, a Victorian needle manufacturer
- Avery Co., a historic farm tractor manufacturer
