= Avory =

Avory is an English surname. Notable people with the surname include:

- Henry Avory (1848–1918), English cricket player
- Horace Avory (1851–1935), English High Court judge
- Mick Avory (born 1944), English musician

== See also ==
- Avery (disambiguation)
