= Roberval =

Roberval can refer to:

== People ==
- Gilles de Roberval, French mathematician and scientist
- Jean-François de la Roque de Roberval, lieutenant-general of New France (1541–1543)

== Places ==
- Roberval, Quebec
  - Roberval (provincial electoral district), a provincial electoral district in Quebec
  - Roberval (electoral district), a Canadian federal electoral district
- Roberval, Oise, a commune in the Oise département, in northern France

== Other ==
- Académie de Roberval, a French high school in Montreal, Quebec
- Roberval Balance, a type of weighing scale
