= Joseph Béranger =

French inventor and a business man (1802–1870)

Joseph Béranger (1802 – 1870) was a French inventor and a business man, owner of a weighing instrument factory, known for a radical change in the Roberval balance design.

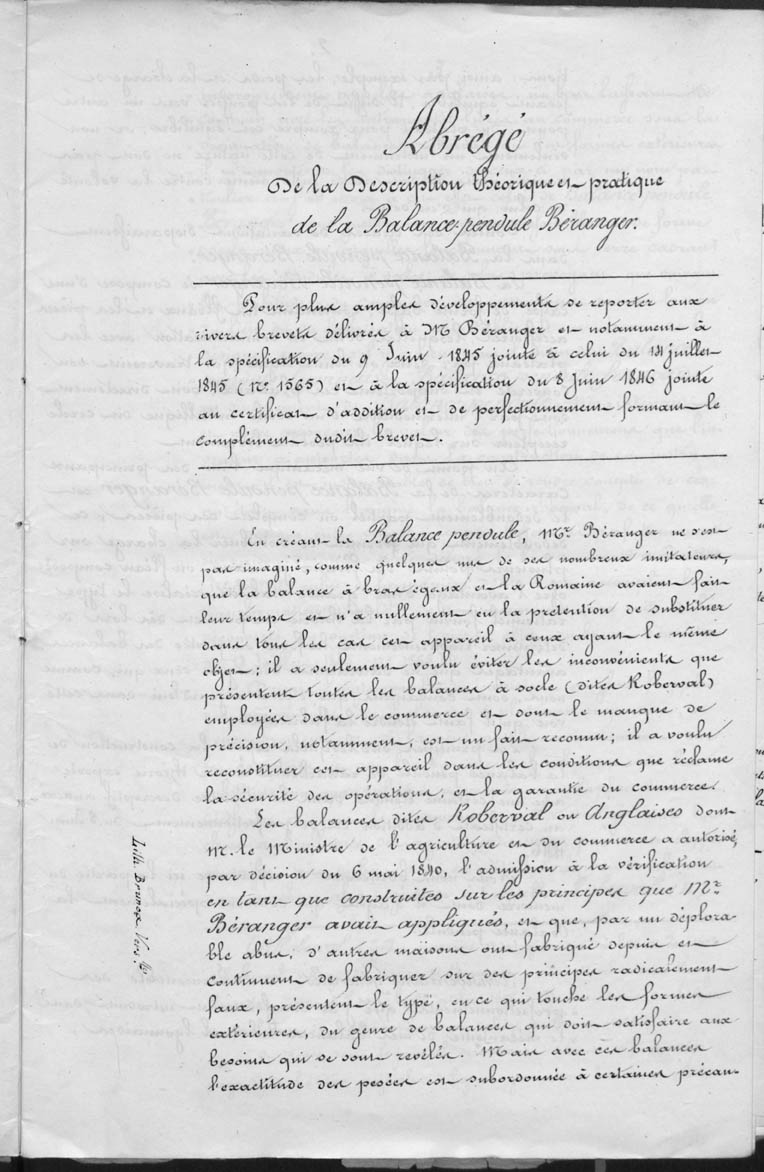
Notice abrégée sur le nouvel instrument de pesage, 1847

== Life ==
He was born in 1802.

In 1827 he created a company with Mercier, la Mercier et Béranger. In 1834 the company took the name of Béranger et Cie; since 1857 the company was managed by his son in law Catenot and the company was called Catenot- Béranger et Cie.

In 1847 Béranger proposed to improve the device of its predecessor, Gilles de Roberval, with auxiliary levers instead of uprights under the double main rocker. Thanks to this it was possible reduce the action of external and frictional forces and, therefore, it was also possible increase the sensitivity of the device. The patent application was deposited in 1847 and the same patent was granted in 1849. An innovative scales design with bowls above the rocker system was introduced in the mass production only at the beginning of the 20th century. For a long time, Béranger scales were present on the counters of many shops.

He died in Marseille in 1870.

== Works ==
- Notice abrégée sur le nouvel instrument de pesage (in French). Versailles. 1847 – via Brunox.
