= William Beilby Avery =

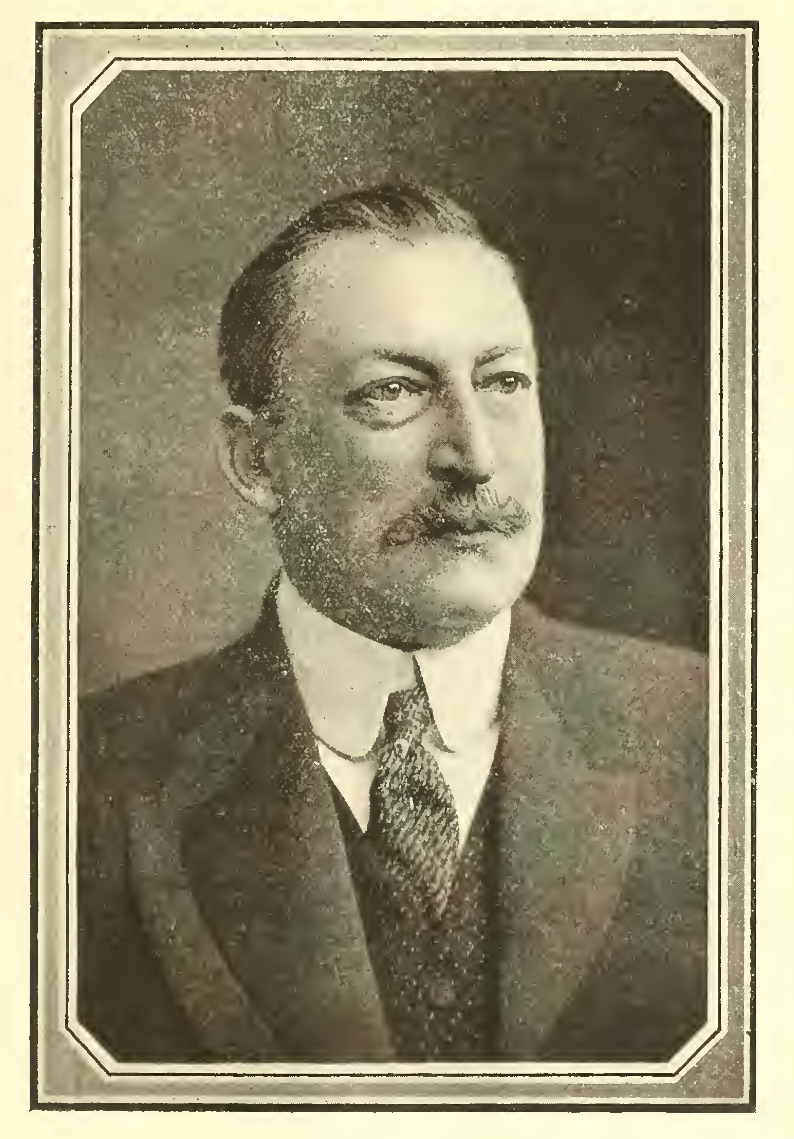
Sir William Beilby Avery, 1905

Sir William Beilby Avery, 1st Baronet (26 April 1854 – 28 October 1908) was a British philatelist who was entered on the Roll of Distinguished Philatelists in 1921 as one of the fathers of philately. His grandfather was the elder brother in W. & T. Avery, weighing machine makers of Birmingham and until he retired Sir William managed a great expansion of that business.

== Baronetcy ==
Avery, member of a long-established dynasty of scale makers and third son of William Henry Avery (1812–1874) of Edgbaston, was created a baronet in 1905. He married twice, firstly to the daughter of Mr. Francis Bell, of London, from which marriage he had a son, William Eric Thomas Avery, who succeeded to his title, and secondly to a daughter of M. Pierre Crets, of Paris. He resided in Birmingham but of late maintained a house, Oakley Court, at Bray, Windsor, and a house in town in Portland Place, where he died.

== W & T Avery ==
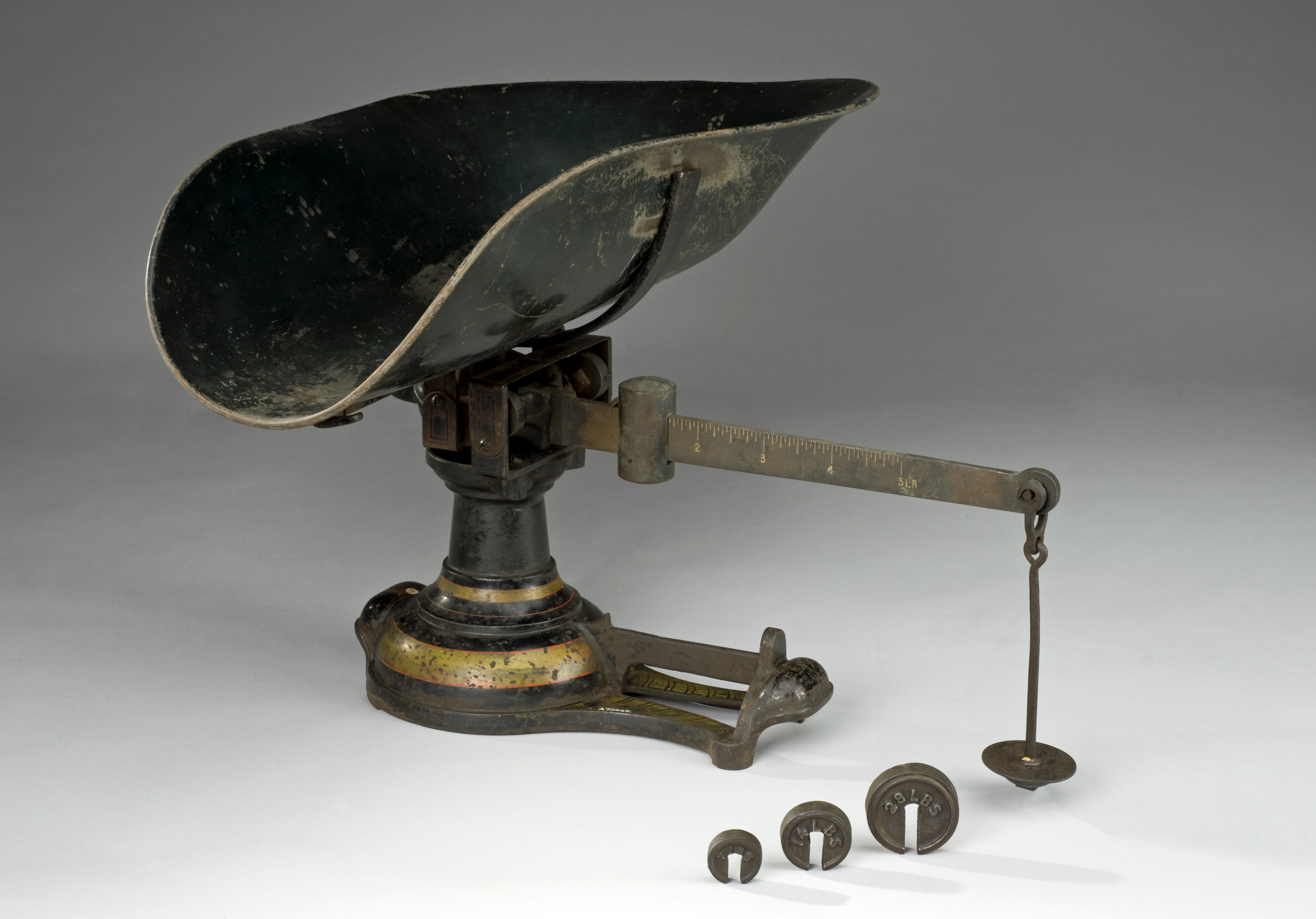
W & T Avery weighing machine for infants

When a mercer and draper, Sir William's grandfather, William Avery who died in 1843 inherited from within his and his wife's family a long established weighing machine business which had begun in the early 18th century with the manufacture of steelyards. With his brother, Thomas who died in 1824, William Avery continued the business under their own names, W & T Avery.

In 1843 two of William's sons took over the business: Sir William's father, William Henry Avery and his younger brother Thomas Avery. Thomas withdrew his capital from the business in 1866 and devoted his energies to improving poor local government. Management of the scale manufacturing business devolved on William Henry and his son (Sir) William Beilby Avery. Father and son proved good managers and the business prospered sending its products throughout the world. From the start of the 21st century it has been known as Avery Weigh-Tronix.

In 1895 W & T Avery purchased the historic Soho Foundry and that site remains the centre of Avery's business.

Its own advertisements describe it as one of the world's leading suppliers of weighing scales, systems and equipment.

Sir William was a director of United Rhodesian Goldfields and of several important British companies.

Uncle Thomas Avery (1813–1894) was three times Mayor of Birmingham.

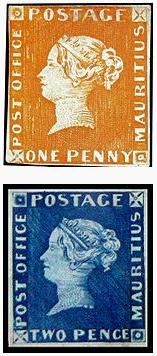
Post Office Mauritius stamps of the type owned by Avery.

== Philately ==
Avery acquired the Bullock collection of Australia, which included many fine Sydney Views, and collections of West Indies and Western Australia from Charles Phillips. He also owned a unique large unused block of the Swiss Double Geneva and had fine holdings of Moldavia and Nevis. With extensive buying in England and Europe, Avery built one of the finest collections of his day. The London stamp dealer W. H. Peckitt, bought Avery's collection in 1909 for £24,500.

Avery's most important pieces were unused one penny and two pence Post Office Mauritius stamps which he acquired in 1893.

In organised philately, Avery was President of the Birmingham Philatelic Society.

== Birmingham University ==
He was a life governor of Birmingham University.

Baronetage of the United Kingdom
New creation	Baronet (of Oakley Court); 1905 – 1908	Succeeded by William Eric Thomas Avery
