= Oakley Court =

Victorian Gothic country house in Bray, Berkshire, England

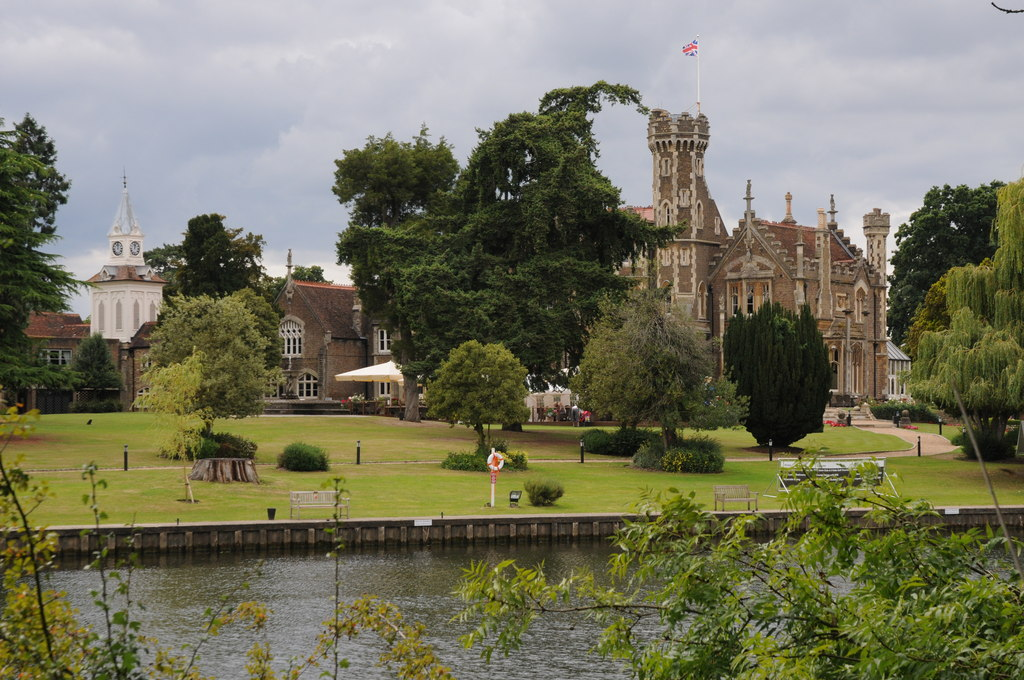
- Oakley Court Hotel, looking south from Dorney Lake Park across the Thames.

- Location within Berkshire

General information
- Type: Country house
- Architectural style: Victorian Gothic
- Location: Bray, Berkshire, England
- Coordinates: 51.4900°N 0.6725°W

Website
- www.oakleycourt.co.uk

Listed Building – Grade II*
- Official name: Oakley Court Hotel
- Designated: 21 December 1977
- Reference no.: 1117481

Oakley Court is a Victorian Gothic country house set in 35 acres (14 ha) overlooking the River Thames at Water Oakley in the civil parish of Bray in the English county of Berkshire. It was built in 1859 and is currently a hotel. It is a Grade II* listed building that has been often used as a film location, most notably for The Curse of Frankenstein (1957).

== Overview ==
The Court was built in 1859 for Sir Richard Hall-Say who married Ellen Evans of Boveney Court in 1857. He was appointed High Sheriff of Berkshire in 1864 and Justice of the Peace in 1865. In 1874 Oakley Court was sold to Lord Otho Fitzgerald, then to a John Lewis Phipps and in 1900 to Sir William Beilby Avery of Avery Scales. In 1919 Ernest Olivier purchased the property together with 50 acres (20 ha) of Berkshire woodland for £27,000.

== History ==
=== Sir Richard Hall-Say ===
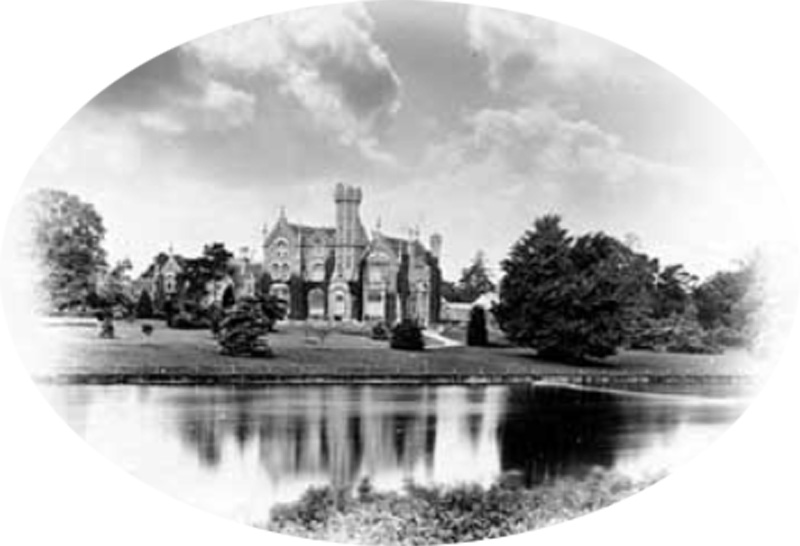
Oakley Court in 1870

Richard Hall-Say built Oakley Court in 1859, two years after his marriage. He was born as Richard Hall in 1827. His father was Richard Hall, a merchant, but it was his mother Harriet Say that brought to him his great wealth. She was the daughter and co-heir of Robert Say who owned Pennington Hall near Manchester. When her uncle, the Rev. Henry Say who had no direct heirs, died in 1855, Richard inherited and took the additional name of Say to become Richard Hall-Say. In 1857 he married Ellen Evans, who was the only child of Edward Evans of Boveney Court in Windsor. The couple had six children, two boys and four girls. Their eldest daughter Mary Violet Hall-Say married the Rev Arthur Henry Austen Leigh who was the great nephew of Jane Austen. In about 1874, the Hall-Say family sold Oakley Court to Lord Otho Fitzgerald.

=== Lord Otho Fitzgerald ===
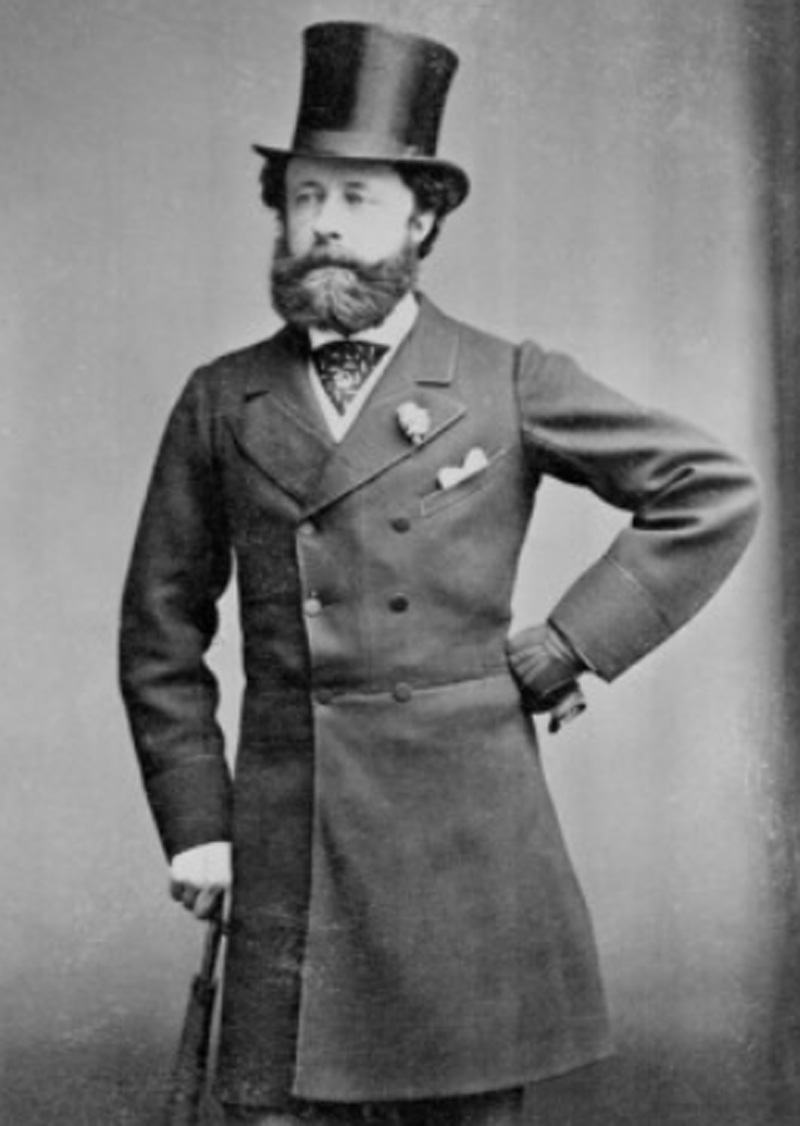
Lord Otho Fitzgerald

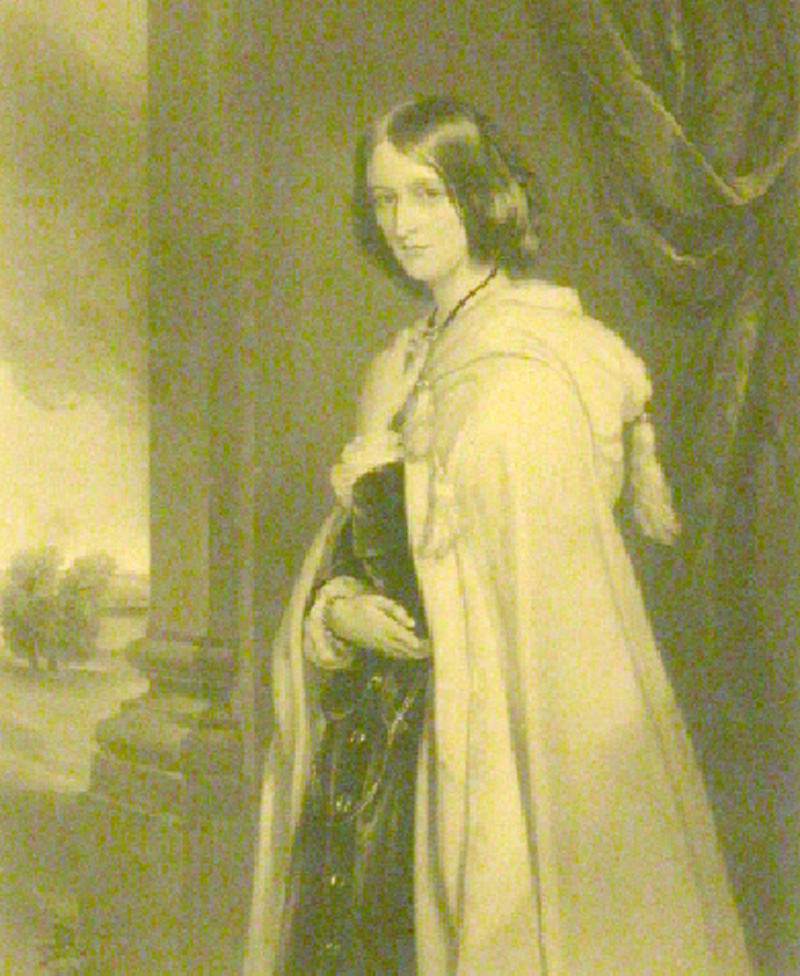
Lady Ursula Fitzgerald

Otho Fitzgerald lived in Oakley Court from 1874 until his death in 1882. He was born in 1827 in London and was the third son of the Duke of Leinster. He entered the army and served in the Royal Horse Guards. He was elected as a Member of Parliament and was appointed to several official positions in the Queen's Household. He was an amateur photographer and several of his photographs are in the Royal Collection. He was also a musical composer and wrote a piece called "The Spirit of the Ball".

In 1861 at the age of 34 he married Ursula, widow of the 1st Baron Londesborough and daughter of Vice-Admiral Charles Orlando Bridgeman. The couple had two children. The Fitzgeralds entertained at Oakley Court, their guests including Napoléon, Prince Imperial of France and Lillie Langtry. Lady Augusta Fane in her memoirs recalls a water party held at Oakley Court where Lillie Langtry was present. Otho died in 1882 and his wife Ursula died a year later. Oakley Court was rented out for the next ten years and then in 1894 John Lewis Phipps bought the house.

=== John Lewis Phipps ===
John Lewis Phipps was born in 1872 in London. His father was Richard Leckonby Hothersal Phipps of Leighton House in Westbury, Wiltshire. His grandfather was John Lewis Phipps (1801–1870) a coffee merchant and Member of Parliament. In 1889 John's father died and he inherited the family fortune. When he bought Oakley House in 1894 he was only 22 years old. Two years before this he had married Mary Jane Davis and they had one son John Nigel Phipps who was born in 1893. The Phipps sold the house to Sir William Avery in 1908.

=== Sir William Avery Baronet ===
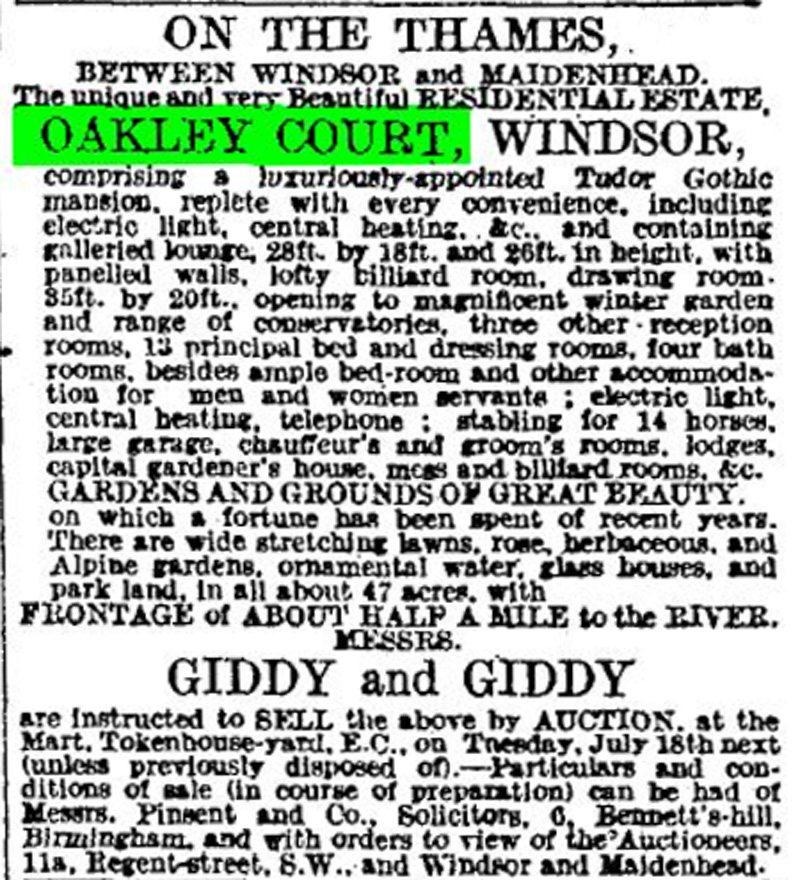
Advertisement for the sale of Oakley Court in 1916.

William Bielby Avery was born in 1854 in Birmingham He was a member of a dynasty of steelyard and scale makers whose business, W & T Avery, manufactured weighing machines. In 1881 he assumed control of the company with his brother and they further developed the company and invented improvements to the machines. In 1891 he retired as managing director but retained a seat on the Board. He was on the board of directors of A Darracq and Company (1905) and Commonwealth Oil Corporation of Australia and other major businesses. He became a philatelist and had a celebrated stamp collection. His first wife Anna Louisa Avery died in 1902 and he married Suzanna Mathilde Crets in Paris in the same year. In 1906 The Gardeners' Chronicle published an article about the Oakley Court garden which can be seen here. William died in 1908 and Lady Avery remarried in 1911. The house was rented for several years and then in 1916 was put on the market. The property was bought by Ernest Oliver.

== Film set ==
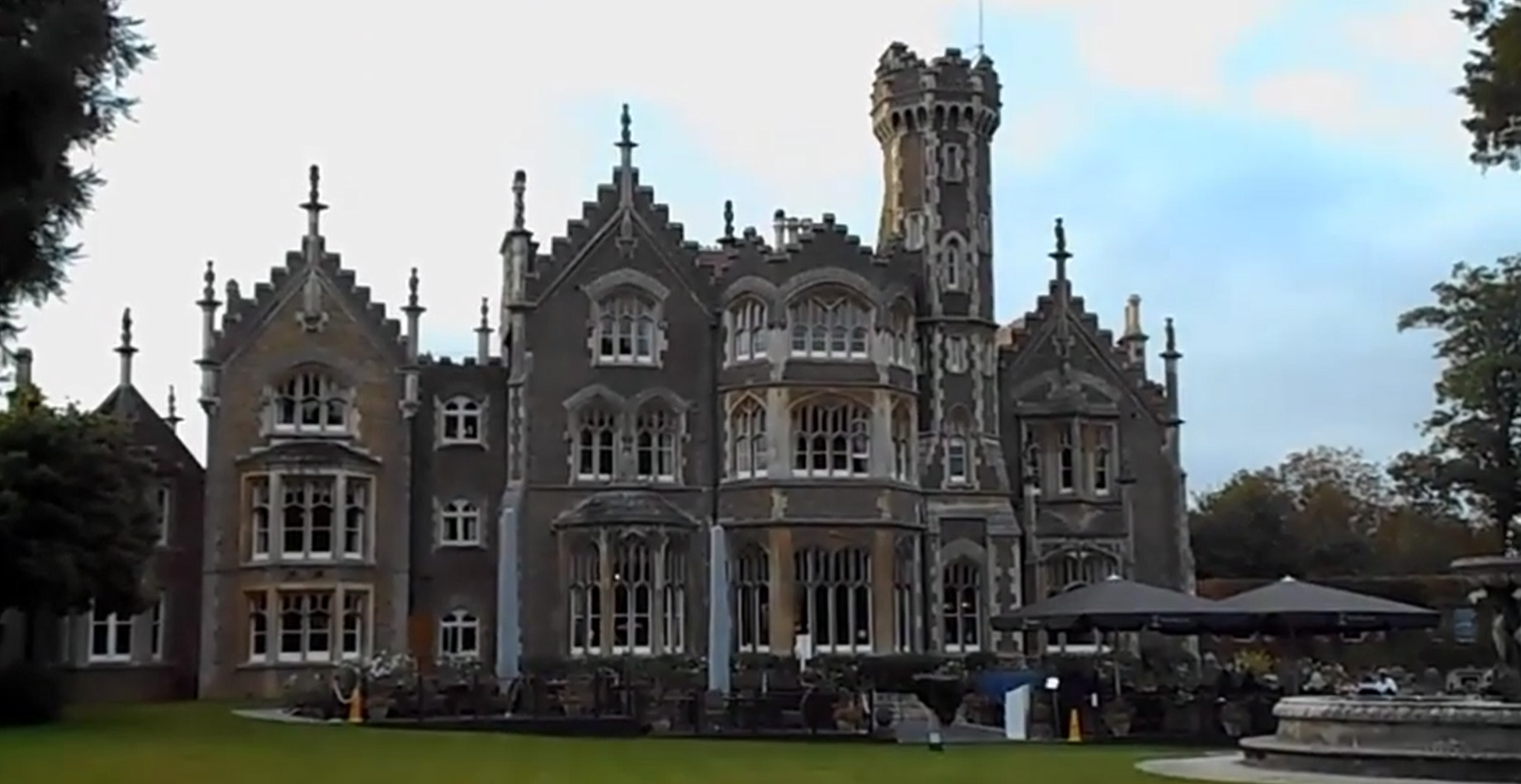
Oakley Court in 2015

In August 1949, Oakley Court became home to the British film production company Hammer Films. Hammer shot five films there, including The Man in Black (1950) and The Lady Craved Excitement (1950), before moving to the adjacent Down Place - which subsequently became Bray Studios - the following year. While the bulk of Hammer's best known horror films were shot at Bray in the late 1950s and early 1960s, the studio continued to make occasional use of Oakley Court as an exterior location, for example in The Brides of Dracula (1962), The Reptile (1966), and The Plague of the Zombies (1966). Other films shot there over the years include the William Castle horror-comedy The Old Dark House (1963); Witchcraft (1964); The Night Digger (1971); Au Pair Girls (1972); And Now the Screaming Starts! (1973); the cult independent horror film Vampyres (1974); the mystery farce Murder by Death (1976); and the Peter Cook and Dudley Moore comedy, The Hound of the Baskervilles (1978). Freddie Francis was inspired by Oakley Court's exteriors and long wished to set a film there; his Mumsy, Nanny, Sonny, and Girly (1970) was written specially to take advantage of the unique landscaping and architecture. It was used as the location for Dr. Frank N. Furter's castle (called The Frankenstein Place) in The Rocky Horror Picture Show (1975). During filming, actress Susan Sarandon, who played Janet Weiss, came down with pneumonia as neither Oakley Court or Bray Studios had heating or bathrooms. At that time, Oakley Court was in a poor condition. In 1995 it was featured as the "Laxton Grange Hotel" in the British television series Pie in the Sky starring Richard Griffiths.

On many web resources, it is erroneously credited as being St Trinian's School in the original St Trinian's film series, but a comparison between the films and the actual building show a quite different architecture and overall design: Easneye House in Hertfordshire. Historical notes available from the hotel, however, indicate that some parts of the St Trinian's films were filmed in the grounds, for example The Wildcats of St Trinian's (1980).

== See also ==
- Grade II* listed buildings in Berkshire
