= Black Patch =

Black Patch may refer to:

- Black Patch Park, Smethwick, England
- Black Patch Tobacco Wars, price war and violence over tobacco prices in early 1900s US
- Black Patch (film), a 1957 American Western film
