= Henry Troemner =

German-American entrepreneur

Henry Troemner (1809–1873) was a German-American entrepreneur. He started the Henry Troemner Company, known today as Troemner Inc. The company produced balances and scales.

Born c. 1809 in Elnhausen, Marburg, Hesse, Germany, Troemner immigrated to the United States in 1832 and settled initially in New York City, then, by 1838, Philadelphia, PA. Trained as a locksmith, he learned the balance trade in Philadelphia. He began making scales and weights in a partnership in 1840, and then established his own company in 1844. He was commissioned by the United States Mint in Philadelphia to make their balances, which he did so well that he was invited to make the bullion balances for the Department of Treasury. He later made scales for the Mexican Mint, Assay Office in New York, and the San Francisco Mint.

According to Ernest Child, Troemner was probably the first American manufacturer to follow the French mathematician Gilles Personne de Roberval's balance design. This is distinguished by the load being superimposed on the beam, rather than suspended from the beam, and allowed faster weighings.

Henry was married c. 1838 in Philadelphia, PA to Catherine Fredericka Ritter (b. 1819 in Wuerttemburg, Germany, d. 14 October 1897 in Philadelphia, PA). They had 13 children: William Henry (1839-1864), John Louis Sr. (1841-1907), Frederick Washington (1843-1902), Emma Augusta (1846-1927), Carl Herman (1848-1850), Charles Edward (1850-1920), Ernest Franklin (1852-1852), Maria Ellen (1853-1853), Maria Ellen (1854-1854), Franklin Henry (1856-1892), August C. (1857-1935), Lydia Matilda (1859-1917), and Robert Wallace (1860-1877). Sons John Louis, Frederick Washington, and Charles Edward continued to head the business in the 20th century.

After his death in 1873 his wife Catherine inherited the business, which was kept in the family until incorporating in 1955. The Troemner company moved from Philadelphia, PA to Thorofare, NJ in 1999 and was acquired by Mettler Toledo in 2016.
