= Wernher baronets =

Extinct baronetcy in the Baronetage of the United Kingdom

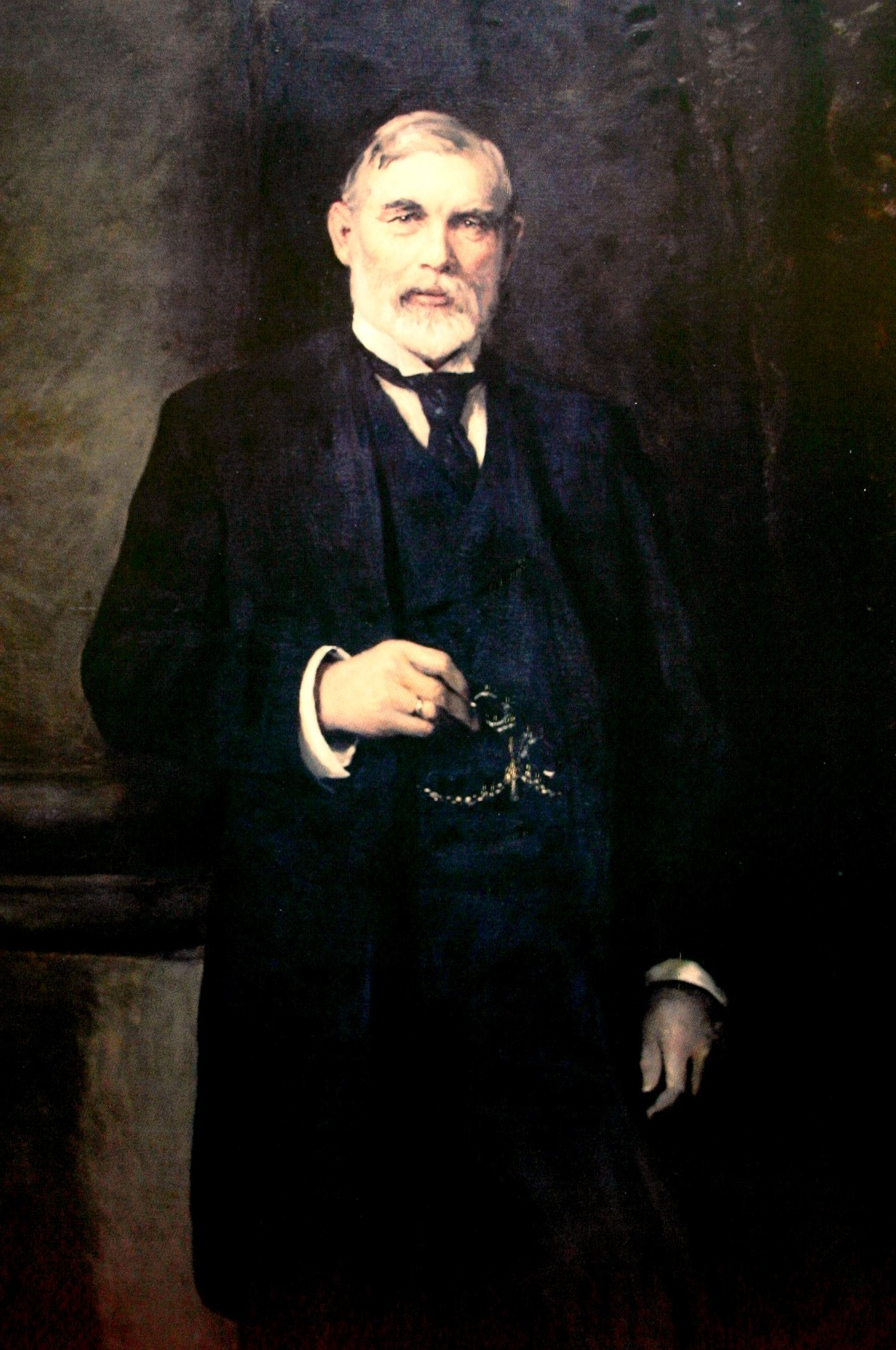
- Sir Julius Wernher, 1st Baronet
- Creation date: 1905
- Status: extinct
- Extinction date: 1973
- Arms: Gules the head of a grappling iron in saltire Argent issuing from the base a mount Vert and in the dexter and sinister base a mullet of six points Or.
- Crest: Between two elephant's trunks the dexter per fess Gules and Or and the sinister per fess Or and Gules a lozenge Sable thereon a mullet as in the arms.

The Wernher baronetcy of Luton Hoo Park in the Parish of Luton, Bedford, was a title in the Baronetage of the United Kingdom. It was created on 2 August 1905 for the German-born Randlord and art collector Julius Wernher.

His younger son, the 3rd Baronet (who succeeded his elder brother), was a major general in the British Army. The title became extinct on his death in 1973.

The family seat was Luton Hoo.

== Wernher baronets, of Luton Hoo (1905) ==
- Sir Julius Charles Wernher, 1st Baronet (1850–1912)
- Sir Derrick Wernher, 2nd Baronet (1889–1948)
- Sir Harold Wernher, 3rd Baronet (1893–1973)

Baronetage of the United Kingdom
Preceded by Tritton baronets	Wernher baronets of Luton Hoo; 2 August 1905	Succeeded by Pound baronets
