= Thomas Avery =

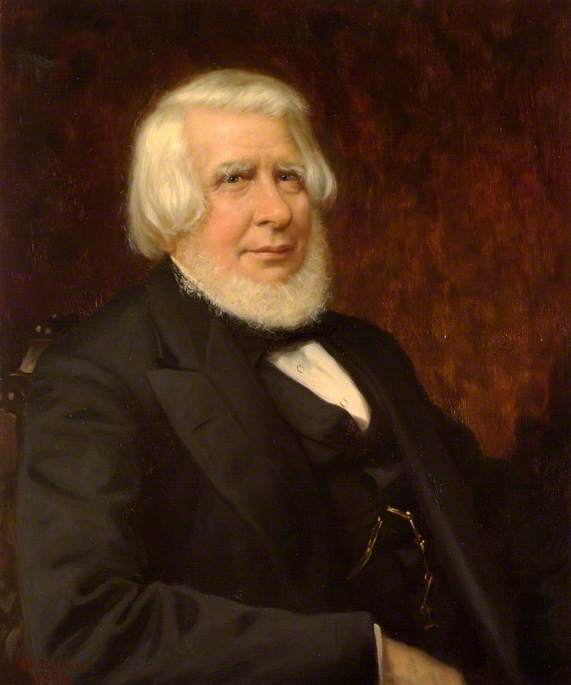
- Born: c. 1813
- Died: 1894
- Occupations: weighing machine manufacturer and local politician

Thomas Avery (c. 1813–1894) was a scale or weighing machine manufacturer and local politician. He was mayor of Birmingham in 1868 and 1881.

== W & T Avery ==
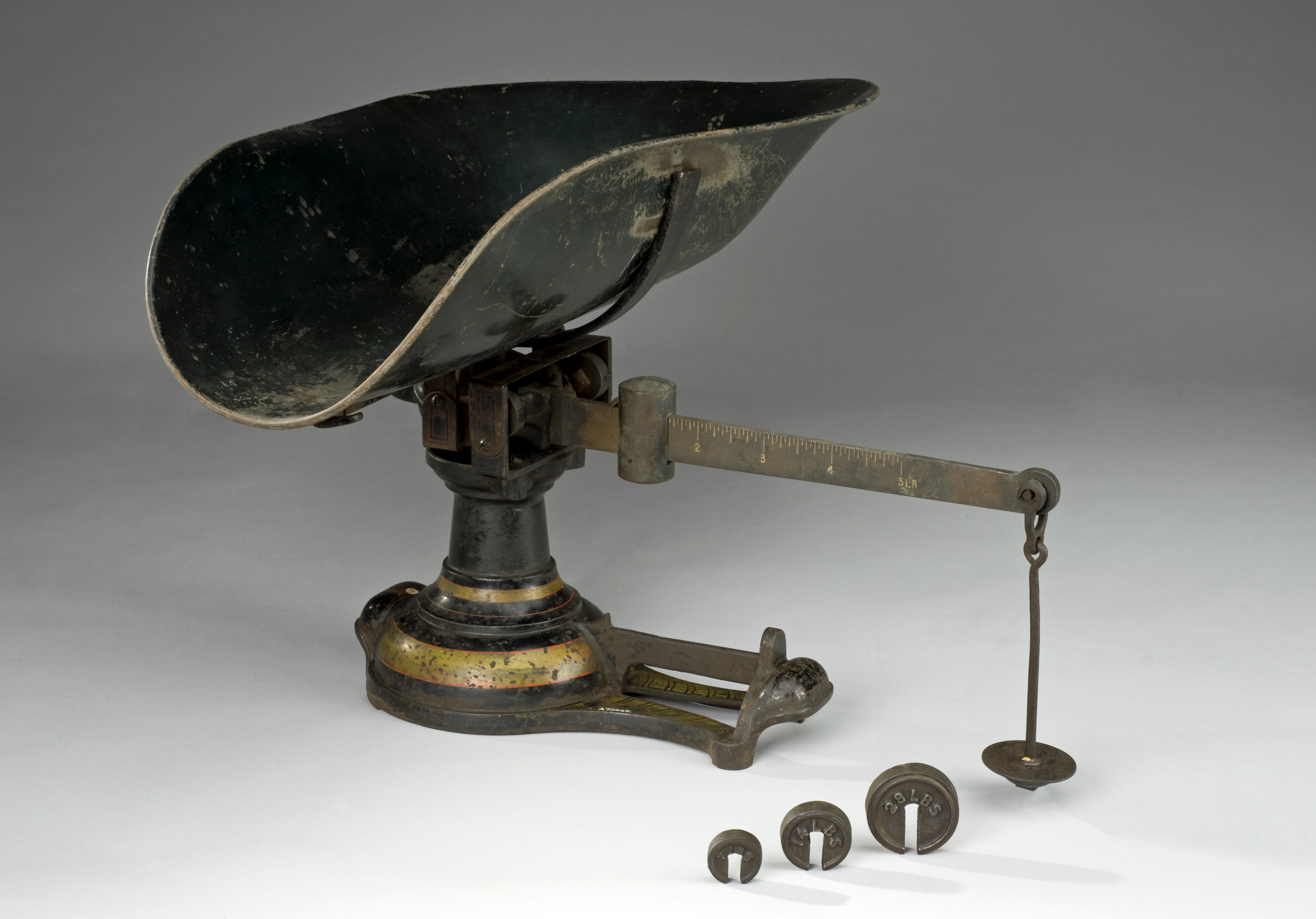
W & T Avery weighing machine for infants

When a mercer and draper, Thomas's father, William Avery who died in 1843, inherited from within his own and his wife's family a long established weighing machine business which had begun in the early 18th century with the manufacture of steelyards.

With his brother, another Thomas who died in 1824, William Avery continued the business under their own names, W & T Avery.

In 1843 two of William's sons Thomas (1813–1894) with his elder brother William Henry Avery (1812–1874) took over the business. Avery's business expanded and became a substantial employer.

== Administration of Birmingham ==
Thomas withdrew his capital from the business in 1866 and devoted his energies to improving the then poor quality local government. He was elected a councillor for the ward containing the Avery businesses as a leading citizen determined to bring some efficiency to council administration and was elected alderman and mayor in 1868 and was mayor again in 1881.

He achieved the provision of sewage works and he was largely responsible for the council acquiring a formerly private water supply which brought potable water to the people of Birmingham. The sewage works was given a sewage farm and sewage no longer contaminated the water of the River Tame.

== Public service ==
Avery was a magistrate for Birmingham, Warwickshire and Worcestershire. He was governor, trustee or treasurer for institutions such as the Birmingham and Midland Institute, Mason College etc.

He died in Edgbaston a few months after his wife —born Mary Ann Beilby— on 17 February 1894. There were no surviving children, his extensive property went to his Avery nephews.
