= Black Patch Park =

Public park in Smethwick, England

Coordinates: 52.497°N 1.944°W

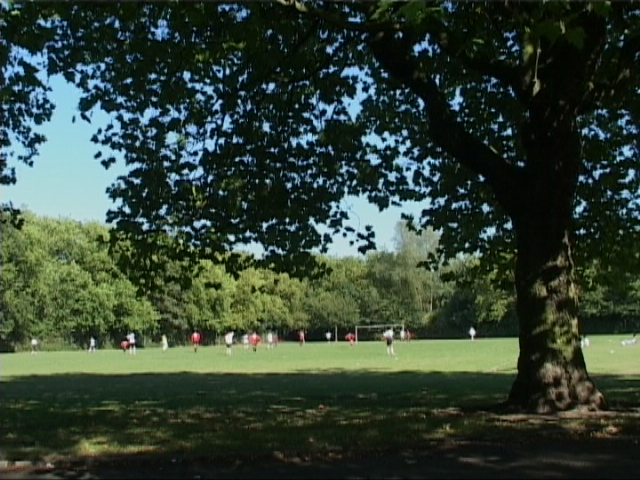
- Football pitch at Black Patch Park
- Interactive map of Black Patch Park
- Type: public
- Location: Smethwick, West Midlands
- Nearest city: Birmingham
- Area: 20 acres (8.1 ha)
- Created: 1911
- Operator: Sandwell Council

Black Patch Park is a park in Smethwick, West Midlands, England. It is bounded by Foundry Lane, Woodburn Road, Perrott Street and Kitchener Street, at grid reference SP038888.

The park, covering over 20 acres (81,000 m^{2}), was part of a sparsely populated landscape of commons and woodland (known as The Black Patch), dotted with farms and cottages which has been transformed from heath to farmland then to a carefully laid out municipal park surrounded by engineering companies employing thousands of people; Tangyes, Nettlefolds, (later GKN plc), the Birmingham Railway Carriage and Wagon Company, Birmingham Aluminium Castings, ironworks, glassmaking and brewing. These factories, including the Soho Foundry, started by James Watt and Matthew Boulton are, but for foundations and frontages, almost all gone.

Much of what is known about Black Patch Chaplin Park appears in a book by Ted Rudge, developed from an Open University degree thesis, and published by Birmingham City Council in 2003. Rudge's research records how, from the mid-19th century until they were evicted from it at the start of the 20th, the 'Black Patch' was the camping ground of a community of tent and vardo (caravan) dwellers who were to become integrated with 'gaujos' (non-Gypsies) in surrounding districts. The Gypsies on the Black Patch lived on a deep barren layer of furnace waste, which, after their eviction, was cleared down to grass growing soil to create a park. There is disputed evidence that Charlie Chaplin might have been born at Black Patch.

== Situation ==
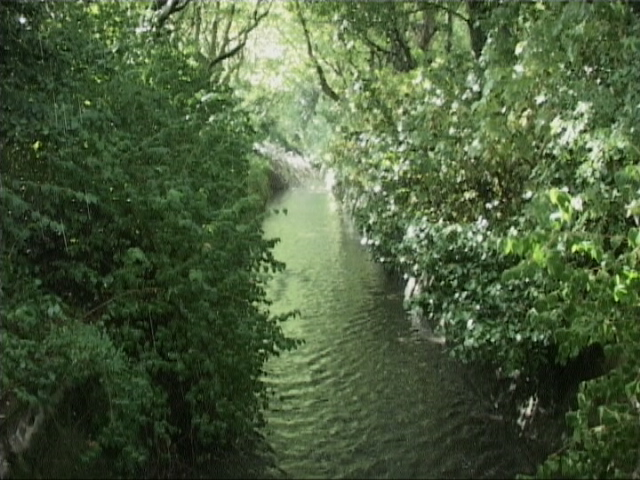
Boundary Brook

Black Patch Park lies 2 1/2 miles from Birmingham city centre just outside the boundary of the city, and is surrounded north, east and south by railway embankments. One of these carries the Birmingham - Wolverhampton part of West Coast Main Line.

For centuries, Boundary Brook marked the boundary between Staffordshire and Warwickshire. In the centre of the park, Boundary Brook meets Hockley Brook, which once separated the country villages of Handsworth and Smethwick. Boundary Brook enters from the South, while Hockley Brook comes in from the West under Woodburn Road.

The park is linked to the Birmingham main line canal via a route through Avery Road that connects it to the West Midlands Sustrans Cycle Route 5, running along the canal towpath, part of a National Cycle Network running from the Cotswolds via Stratford-upon-Avon, Warwick, Birmingham, and Stafford to Stoke-on-Trent in Staffordshire.

Black Patch Park is edged by Foundry Lane to the west and south, Woodburn Road to the north, and to the east, Perrott Street, beyond which, as far as Handsworth New Road, stretches the triangle of Merry Hill Allotment Gardens. The West Midlands Metro has two stops nearby; Winson Green Outer Circle and Handsworth Booth Street. Kitchener Street which, until they were demolished in 1980, ran between terraced houses, was gated in January 2009 under section 129A of the Highways act 1980 - a measure intended by Sandwell MBC to prevent extensive fly-tipping.

== Industrial Revolution ==
In 1769 James Brindley supervised the building of a canal between Birmingham and the Black Country. This waterway came to be known, within 60 years, as the 'old' Main Line Canal after Thomas Telford constructed a straighter, broader New Birmingham Main Line Canal, which opened in 1829 to carry an ever-increasing volume of narrow boat traffic. Brindley and Telford's waterways attracted industrial entrepreneurs including Matthew Boulton, and James Watt who bought 18 acres (73,000 m^{2}) by the canal at Merry Hill, about a mile from the firm's Soho Manufactory in Handsworth and opened the Soho Foundry in 1796 'for the purpose of casting everything relating to our steam engines'.

As the local population grew, tension developed between them and the travellers. Rudge records that Gypsies and travellers camped on the "Black Patch" from the mid-19th century, not always with approval of local people. Only in the early 20th century, and after several attempts, were the Gypsies finally and forcibly evicted from the 'Black Patch' as rising population density and new land owning assumptions placed greater and greater restriction on their traditional sites.

From being an industrial site, the area was transformed in little more than a lifetime, to a site of dereliction, with the decline of almost all the park's surrounding industrial giants during the economic upheaval of the 1960s. One successful survivor is Avery Weigh-Tronix on Foundry Lane, the world's largest manufacturers of machines for weighing, counting, measuring and testing, whose main entrance is the frontage of Boulton's and Watt's old Soho Foundry opposite the 'Soho Foundry Tavern'.

== Gypsy connection ==
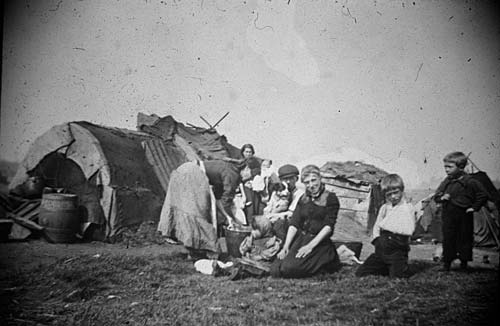
Gypsies on the Black Patch

Rudge says that Esau Smith was the acknowledged king of the Black Patch. When he died in 1901 at the age of 92, his widow Henty was elected queen. Even while Esau was alive it was generally understood by local people that the Gypsies gained legal rights to the land as squatters. Though such rights are seldom written down, it is said that deeds to this effect were destroyed when the king and queen's caravan was ritually burned after her death on 7 January 1907. Queen Henty, who was buried with her husband in the churchyard of St Mary's Church, Handsworth, is said to have placed a curse on anyone who builds over the Black Patch, the subject of a song by the well known folk artist Bryn Phillips in September 2003.

In 1906 Mrs E J E Pilkington and Tangye Ltd were referred to as legal owners of Black Patch, having put it up for sale after employing land agents to carry out a court imposed eviction of the Gypsies on 26 July 1905. They did not finally relinquish links with the land until a "peaceful eviction" was negotiated by Birmingham Corporation Parks Department on 15 February 1909. Subsequent stories contribute to reasonable doubt as to who ought to have inherited the Black Patch and who now holds legal title to the Gypsies' old camping ground. Rudge reports that in 1960 Jane Badger, who lived near Black Patch, got into conversation while walking by the Park with a gentleman with an American accent. He claimed he owned the deeds to the land. This story resembles a statement made by Ray Plant, a distant relative of the Black Patch Gypsies, that a family called Murdock once owned the land and gave permission to camp there. According to Ray Plant when the Murdocks emigrated to America they handed over the Black Patch deeds to the Gypsies. The deeds were apparently stolen making any of the gypsies claims to the land unfounded. Many of the gypsy descendants still live in the surrounding area - the names of descendants accessible via the National Census.

In July 2005, a memorial plaque to the gypsies was erected. Sometime in March 2007 this plaque disappeared but has since been replaced.

== Creating the Park ==
Despite past and present doubts about exact ownership the impetus for and organisation of its purchase and development as a public park came from the Birmingham Playgrounds, Open Spaces and Playing Fields Society, chaired by John Nettlefold, a Birmingham Councillor, married into the Chamberlain family. A mix of public subscription and cash from Smethwick and Handsworth Councils and Birmingham Corporation raised £12,200. One of the vendors, Mrs Pilkington, donated £500 from the conveyance to assist with their aim of providing a place where people could enjoy fresh air away from the smoky atmosphere of the surrounding factories. The new public space was divided into three; 6 acres (24,000 m^{2}) in Handsworth, seven in Smethwick and seven in Birmingham. Further land was acquired to build Perrott Street, widen the Great Western Railway and provide the Merry Hill Allotments on the other side of Perrott Street. Birmingham Corporation was asked by the Society to lay out and manage Black Patch Park. Unemployed people under the supervision of a Parks' Superintendent carried out this work. It began in January 1909 and was completed in May 1910. The Lord Mayor of Birmingham, Alderman Bowater, formally opened the Black Patch Recreation Ground on 20 June 1911. In 1966 management was taken over by the new Borough of Warley, now Sandwell Metropolitan Council, whose Planning Department confirms that covenants held by Pilkington and Tangye still exist, but until then Black Patch Park was under the stewardship of Birmingham Parks Department.

== Campaign to save Black Patch Park ==
In August 2003 a campaigning group called "The Friends of Black Patch Park" was formed to challenge proposals outlined in Sandwell Council's Unitary Development Plan to zone two thirds of the park for industrial use. The aim of the Friends of Black Patch Park has been to protect, celebrate and enhance the park's 20 acres (81,000 m^{2}) - as originally created by public subscription in 1907 - as a place of historic importance and indispensable green space for future generations. As well as its legacy as a traditional Romany camping ground, the park's current value is as a wildlife oasis, a place for quiet walks and relaxation and an essential site for a large number of young people from diverse backgrounds to practice sport. Footballers from the Soho Foundry Tavern and many other Warley League Teams, are strongly against the loss of the playing fields that make up the largest part of the Black Patch.

== Regeneration ==
In 2018, Sandwell Council published a document setting out a vision to improve the park and redevelop part of the surrounding area for housing.
