= Avery baronets =

Extinct baronetcy in the Baronetage of the United Kingdom

- Escutcheon of the Avery baronets of Oakley Court, Berkshire
- Creation date: 1905
- Status: extinct
- Extinction date: 1918
- Seats: Oakley Court, Bray, Berkshire

The Avery baronetcy of Oakley Court in the parish of Bray in the County of Berkshire, was created for William Avery in the Baronetage of the United Kingdom on 6 December 1905. On the death in 1918 of the 2nd Baronet the Baronetcy became extinct.

== Avery baronets, of Oakley Court, Berkshire (1905) ==
1. Sir William Beilby Avery, 1st Baronet (1854–1908)
2. Sir William Eric Thomas Avery, 2nd Baronet (1890–1918). He is noted for his 1916 design of the "Eye" divisional symbol for the Guards, in line with an idea of Andrew Thorne.

Baronetage of the United Kingdom
Preceded by Pound baronets	Avery baronets of Oakley Court; 6 December 1905	Succeeded by Coats baronets
