= Pound baronets =

Baronetcy in the Baronetage of the United Kingdom

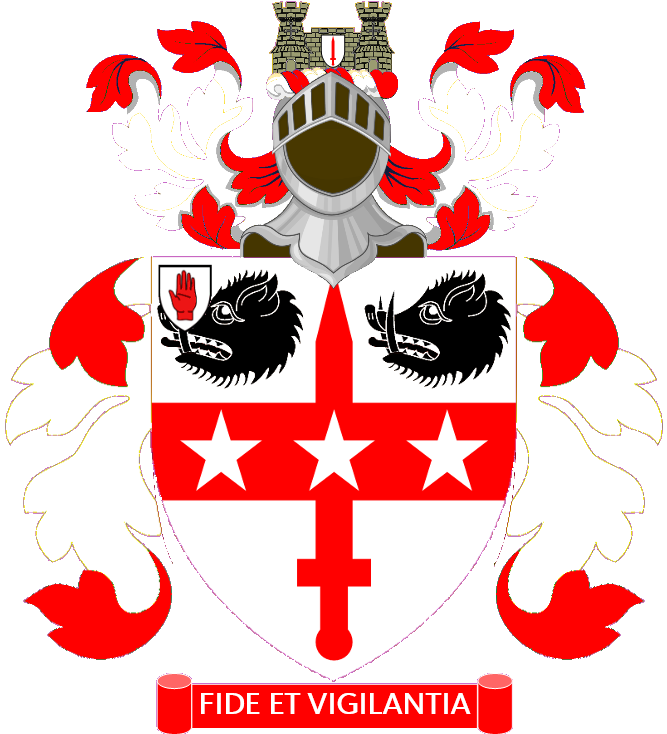
- Crest: A castle of two towers Proper thereon an escutcheon Argent charged with a sword erect as in the arms.
- Shield: Argent a sword erect Gules debruised by a fess of the last charged with three mullets of the first and between in chief two boars' heads erased Sable.
- Motto: Fide Et Vigilantia

The Pound baronetcy, of Stanmore in the County of Middlesex, is a title in the Baronetage of the United Kingdom. It was created on 3 August 1905 for John Pound, then head of luggage manufacturers John Pound and Co. and also chairman of the London General Omnibus Company, who served as Lord Mayor of London from 1904 to 1905.

== Pound baronets, of Stanmore (1905) ==
- Sir John Pound, 1st Baronet (1829–1915)
- Sir (John) Lulham Pound, 2nd Baronet (1862–1937)
- Sir Allen Leslie Pound, 3rd Baronet (1888–1952)
- Sir Derek Allen Pound, 4th Baronet (1920–1980)
- Sir John David Pound, 5th Baronet (1946–2022)
- Sir Robert John Pound, 6th Baronet (born 1973)

The heir presumptive is the current baronet's half-brother, Christopher James Pound (born 1982).

== Notes ==
Baronetage of the United Kingdom
Preceded by Wernher baronets	Pound baronets of Stanmore; 3 August 1905	Succeeded by Avery baronets
