= Sir John Pound, 1st Baronet =

English businessman

Sir John Pound Bt
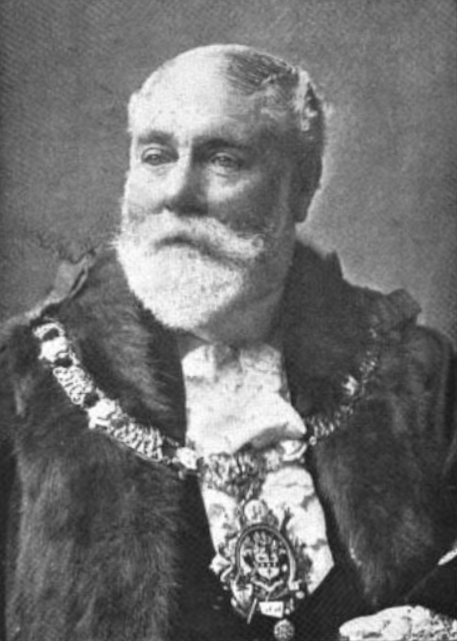
- In The Sketch, 6 November 1895

Lord Mayor of London
- In office 1904–1905

Sheriff of London
- In office 1895–1896

Personal details
- Born: 27 June 1829 City of London, England
- Died: 18 September 1915 (aged 86) Islington, London, England
- Spouse: Harriet Lulham (m. 1856)
- Children: 6
- Occupation: Businessman, politician

Sir John Pound, 1st Baronet (27 June 1829 – 18 September 1915), was an English businessman, the owner of luggage manufacturer and retailer John Pound & Co. of London, and Lord Mayor of London in 1904/05.

== Early and personal life ==
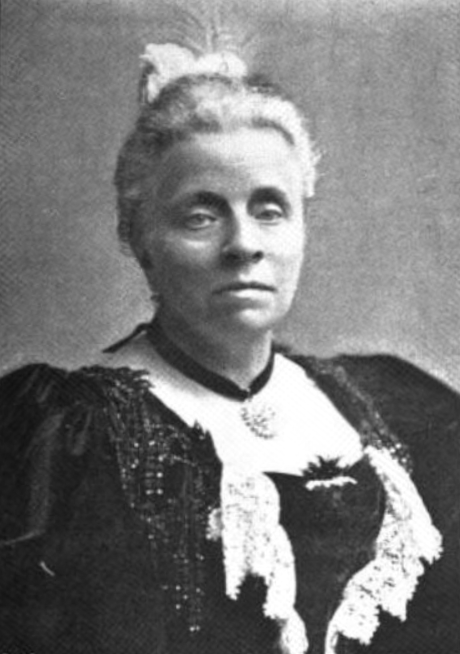
Harriet Pound

John Pound was born in the City of London on 27 June 1829, the son of Henry Pound and Alfred Victor Allen. He married Harriet Lulham, daughter of Thomas Lulham, on 3 December 1856. The couple had six children: John (died after six months); Harriet; John; Annie; Jessie; and Percy. Pound was educated at Christ's Hospital school, Newgate from 1838 to 1844.

== John Pound & Co. ==
The business of John Pound & Co. was started by John Pound's father, Henry Pound and his partner Mr. Tasker, in Leadenhall Street, London in 1823. Pound & Tasker was founded as a manufacturer high-quality trunks and packing cases, selling via a single manufacturing premises/shop.

After the death of Mr Tasker in 1857, Henry apprenticed his eldest son John and renamed the business Henry Pound & Son. After the death of his father in 1861, John renamed the business John Pound & Co., and began building it into the biggest business of its kind in the United Kingdom. By 1871 the company had: three factories; eight distribution warehouses; and five shops in central London at Leadenhall Street, Regent Street, Oxford Street, Piccadilly, and Tottenham Court Road. Now, as well as luggage and dressing cases, the company made hunting bags, hat cases, writing cases and purses.

After he became Lord Mayor of London in 1904, John handed the business over to his two elder sons. The business continued to trade as an independent retailer, until it was taken over by the John Lewis Partnership in the early 1950s. Stuart Eggleton acquired the John Pound brand from John Lewis in 2013.

== Other positions ==
As well as his successful business, Pound built up a series of civic positions.

A member of the Worshipful Company of Leathersellers, he became its master, as well as that of the Fan Makers and latterly the Fruiterers. This led to him becoming an Alderman of London between 1892 and 1915, for the Ward of Aldgate, and then a Lieutenant of the City of London. He was elected Sheriff of London for 1895–96.

Pound became a director of the London General Omnibus Company, and was its chairman for over 30 years. He oversaw the switch of London's mass public transport from horse-drawn trams to self-propelled omnibuses.

On 29 September 1904, it was announced that he would replace Sir James Ritchie as Lord Mayor of London. On 3 August 1905, he was created 1st Baronet Pound, of Stanmore, Middlesex.

He died at his home in Highbury New Park on 18 September 1915, aged 86, and was buried at Ilford Cemetery.

== Awards ==
Sir John Pound, 1st Baronet
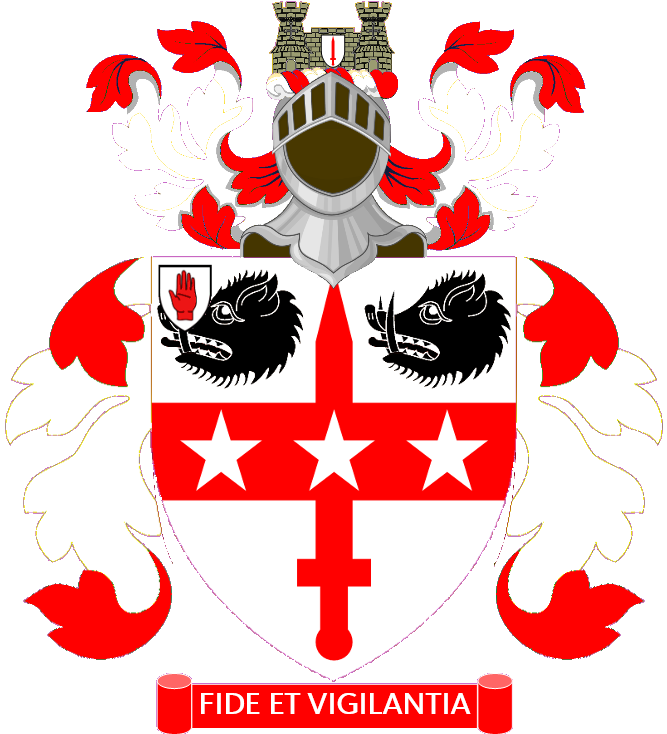
- Crest: A castle of two towers Proper thereon an escutcheon Argent charged with a sword erect as in the arms.
- Shield: Argent a sword erect Gules debruised by a fess of the last charged with three mullets of the first and between in chief two boars’ heads erased Sable.
- Motto: Fide Et Vigilantia

From foreign monarchies and governments, he received the following decorations:

- Grand Officer, Order of Isabella the Catholic of Spain
- Commander, Order of the Rising Sun of Japan
- Légion d'honneur
- Grand Officer, Order of Christ of Portugal

Civic offices
Preceded by James Ritchie	Lord Mayor of London; 1904–1905	Succeeded by Walter Morgan
Baronetage of the United Kingdom
New creation	Baronet (of Stanmore, Middlesex); 1905–1915	Succeeded by (John) Lulham Pound
