= George Haden =

British engineer (1788–1856)

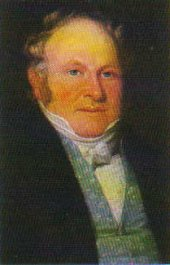
Portrait of George Haden

George Haden (1788–1856) was a British engineer, inventor and holder of several patents relating to woollen milling and warm-air heating. He is most known for the design of heating systems for Wilton House, the Houses of Parliament, the British Museum Reading Room and in 1826, at the request of King George IV, Windsor Castle.

== Early life ==
Haden was born into a family of engineers; his father (also named George) was associated with the Birmingham Soho Foundry of Matthew Boulton and James Watt. Haden and his brothers, John and James, followed him into this industry. Having completed his apprenticeship in 1809, Haden was first sent to Scotland and the north of England to supervise the installation of steam engines. In 1814 he was sent to the south-west of England to install machinery for the new industry of woollen-milling and his first assignment was for J&T Clark at their mill in Trowbridge, Wiltshire. He was a success and was soon joined by his wife, Anne Nelson, whom he married in 1816, and brother James.

== Career ==
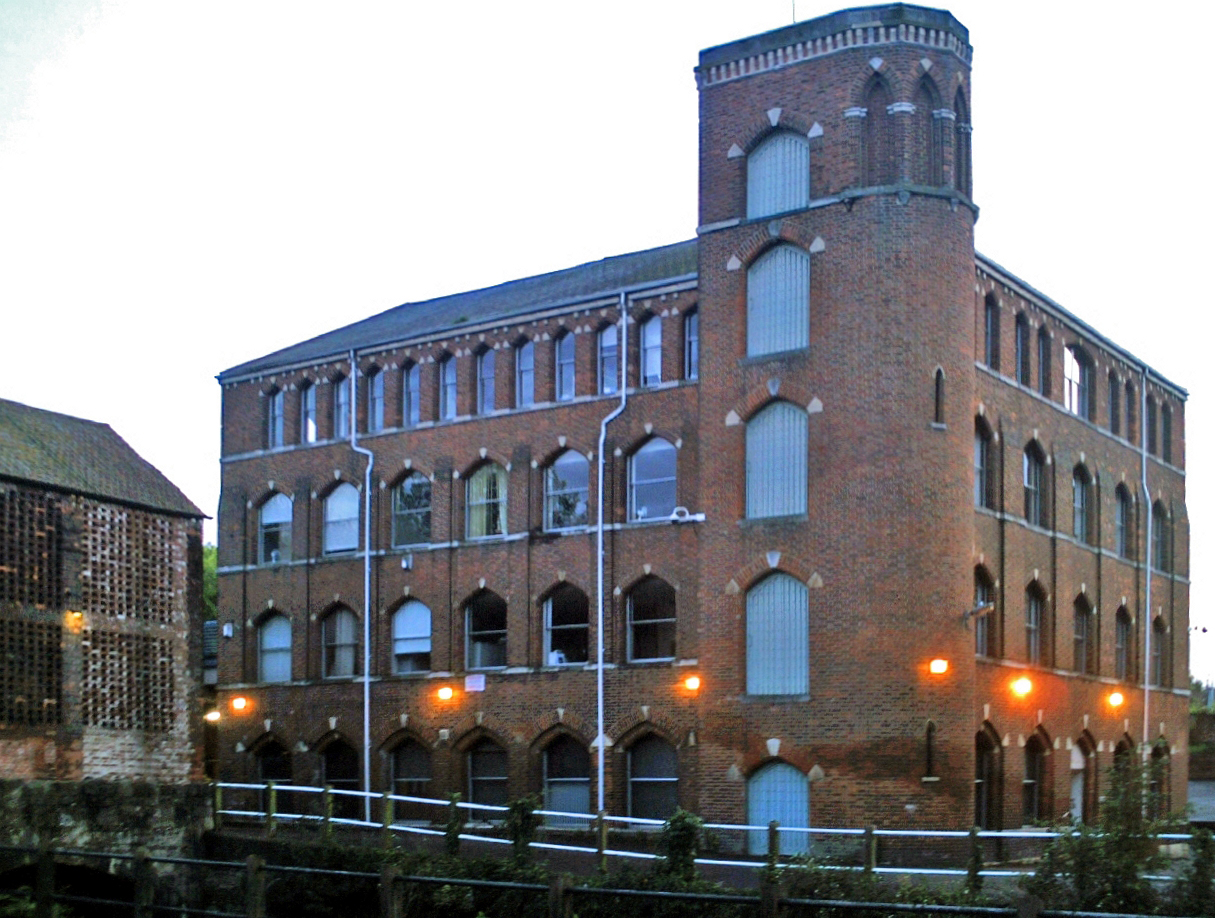
Clark's Mill, Trowbridge, now used as offices

At some point, which is not documented, Haden moved from dealing with steam engines to devising and installing warm-air heating systems. The first mention of this interest appears in a letter he wrote in 1816, the year he started his company, G & J Haden, with his brother James. He began to manufacture stoves and cooking ovens in Trowbridge around 1819. For Jeffry Wyattville's refurbishment of Windsor Castle, King George IV engaged Haden in 1826 to design and install the new heating system. By 1830, Haden had gained a reputation for this and his London installations, and his order book of the time shows work for the Earl of Pembroke at Wilton House. The heating system installed at Erddig House in North Wales remains in place on the lower ground floor.

In 1834 Haden joined the Institution of Civil Engineers, his membership certificate being signed by the Chairman Thomas Telford, and was a member until his death. He was granted several patents relating to the woollen industry, and in 1842, one in relation to his heating systems.

== Legacy ==
By the start of the 20th century, Haden's company had become one of the largest heating and ventilating companies in England. In 1980, Haden Young Building Services Ltd became part of the Balfour Beatty Group.
