= Henry Avory =

English cricketer

Personal information
- Full name: Henry Kemp Avory
- Born: 4 October 1848; Clapham, Surrey, England
- Died: 16 April 1918 (aged 69); Weybridge, Surrey, England
- Batting: Right-handed

Domestic team information
- Years: Team
- 1876: Surrey

Career statistics
Competition	First-class
Matches	2
Runs scored	82
Batting average	20.50
100s/50s	–/–
Top score	42
Balls bowled	–
Wickets	–
Bowling average	–
5 wickets in innings	–
10 wickets in match	–
Best bowling	–
Catches/stumpings	–/–
- Source: Cricinfo, 9 June 2012

Henry Kemp Avory (4 October 1848 – 16 April 1918) was an English cricketer. Avory was a right-handed batsman. He was born at Clapham, Surrey.

Avory made two first-class appearances for Surrey in August 1876, against Middlesex and Yorkshire, with both his appearances coming at The Oval. In his first match, Middlesex won the toss and elected to bat first, making 138 all out. In response, Surrey made 215 all out, with Avory, who opened the batting alongside Harry Jupp, being dismissed by V. E. Walker for 31. Middlesex then made 322 all out in their second-innings, leaving Surrey with a victory target of 246. Avory again opened the batting alongside Jupp, scoring 42 runs before he was dismissed by Russell Walker. Surrey were eventually dismissed for 245, resulting in a tied match. In his second appearance, Yorkshire won the toss and elected to bat, making just 68 all out. In reply, Surrey made 118 all out, with Avory being dismissed for 9 runs by Tom Armitage. Yorkshire then made 151 all out in their second-innings, leaving Surrey with a victory target of 102. Surrey fell 25 runs short in being dismissed for just 77, with Avory dismissed in the chase for a duck by Tom Emmett. He batted at number three in the innings, the only time he would not open the batting.

He died at Weybridge, Surrey, on 16 April 1918.
