= Avery, Michigan =

- Unincorporated community
- Location within the state of Michigan
- Coordinates: 41°49′24″N 86°34′33″W
- Country: United States
- State: Michigan
- County: Berrien
- Township: Three Oaks
- Elevation: 666 ft (203 m)
- Time zone: UTC-5 (Eastern (EST))
  - Summer (DST): UTC-4 (EDT)
- ZIP code(s): 49128
- Area code: 269
- GNIS feature ID: 2376506

Avery is an unincorporated community in Three Oaks Township within Berrien County, in the U.S. state of Michigan.

== History ==
A post office was established at Avery in 1860, and remained in operation until 1890. Gilbert B. Avery, the first postmaster and proprietor of a local sawmill, gave the community his last name.
