= Soho Foundry =

Historical factory in Smethwick, England

- Location: Birmingham, United Kingdom
- Coordinates: 52.4972°N 1.9475°W
- Owners: Matthew Boulton; James Watt

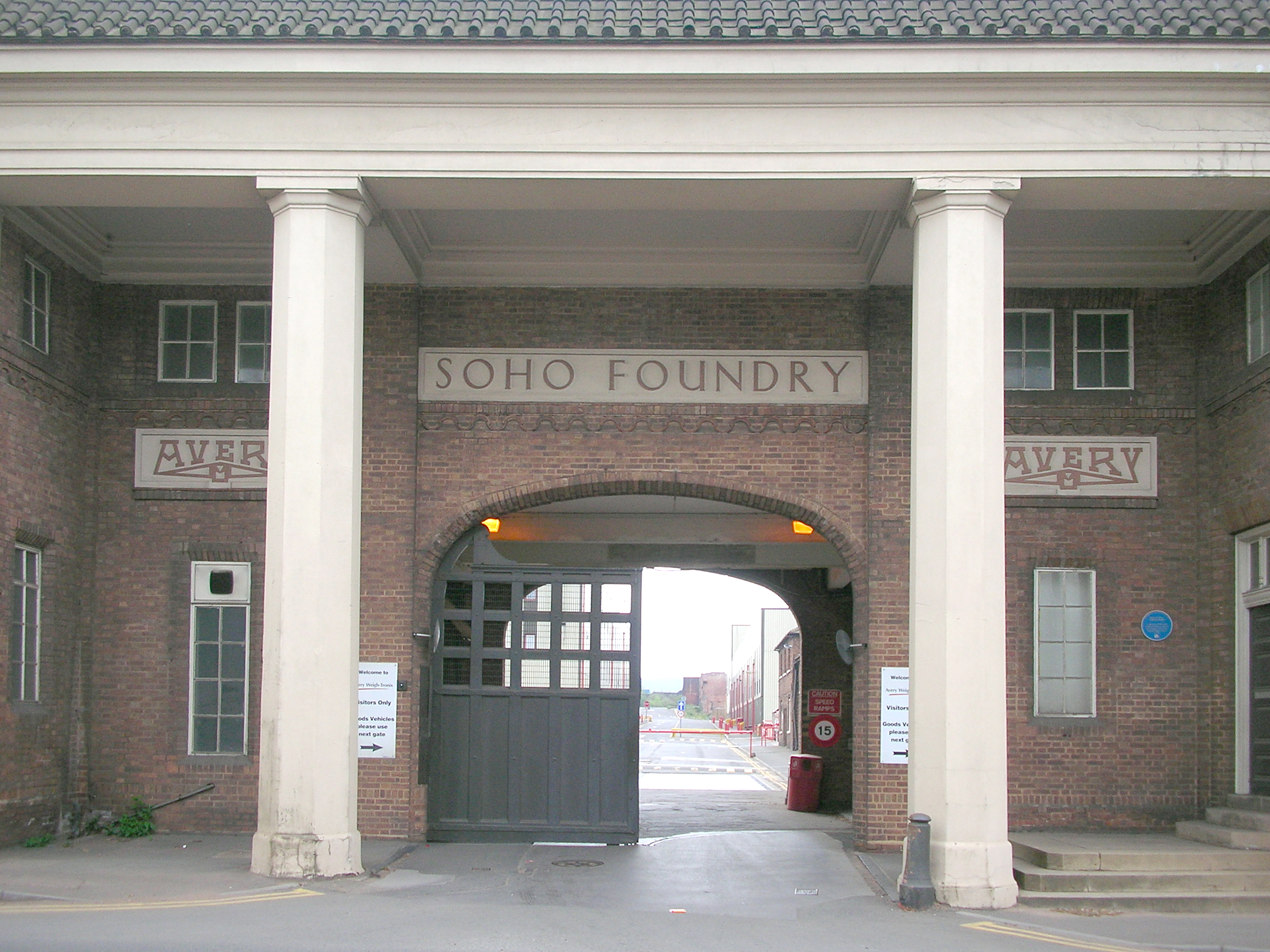
Soho Foundry main gate

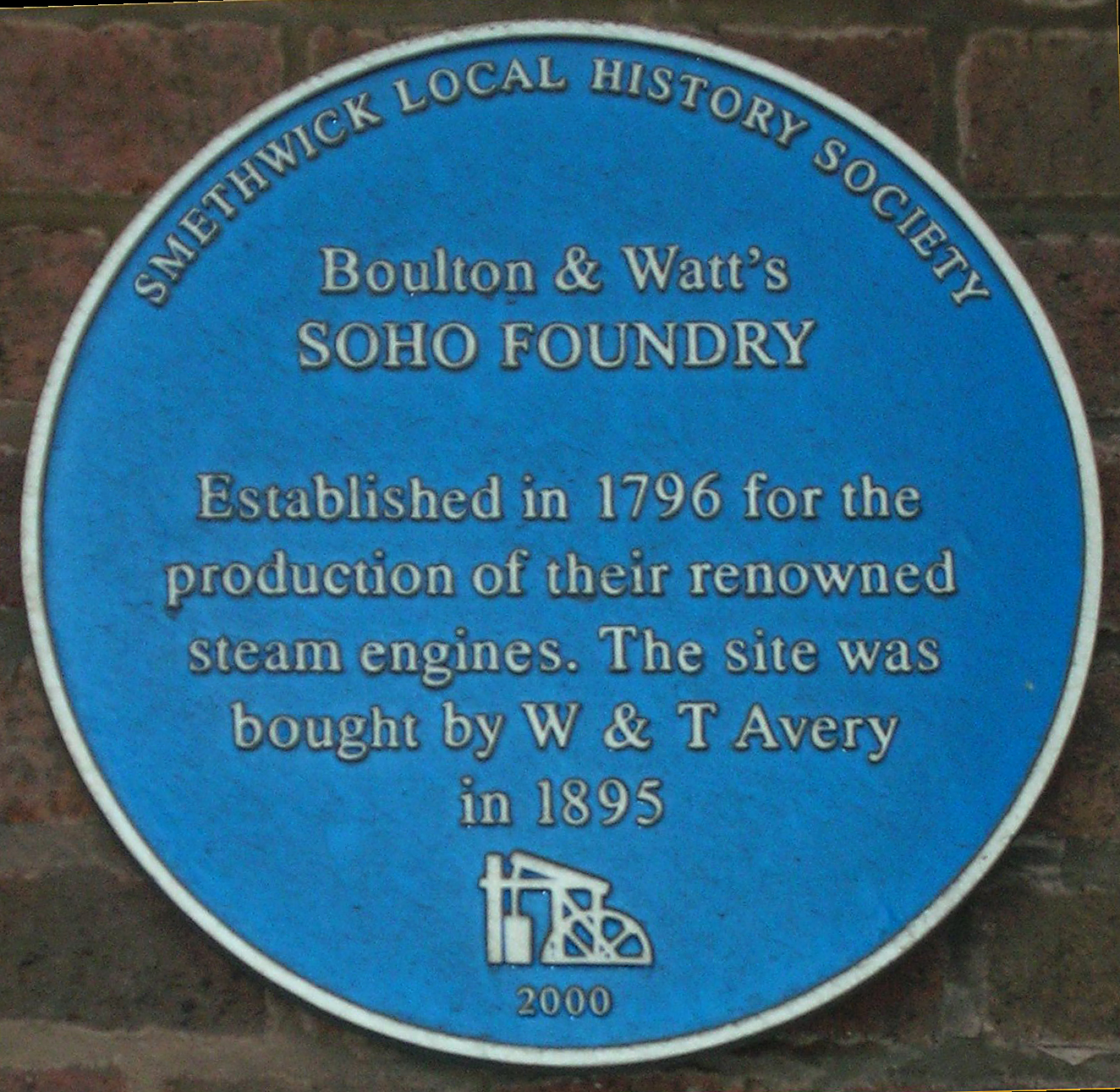
Blue plaque at the main gate

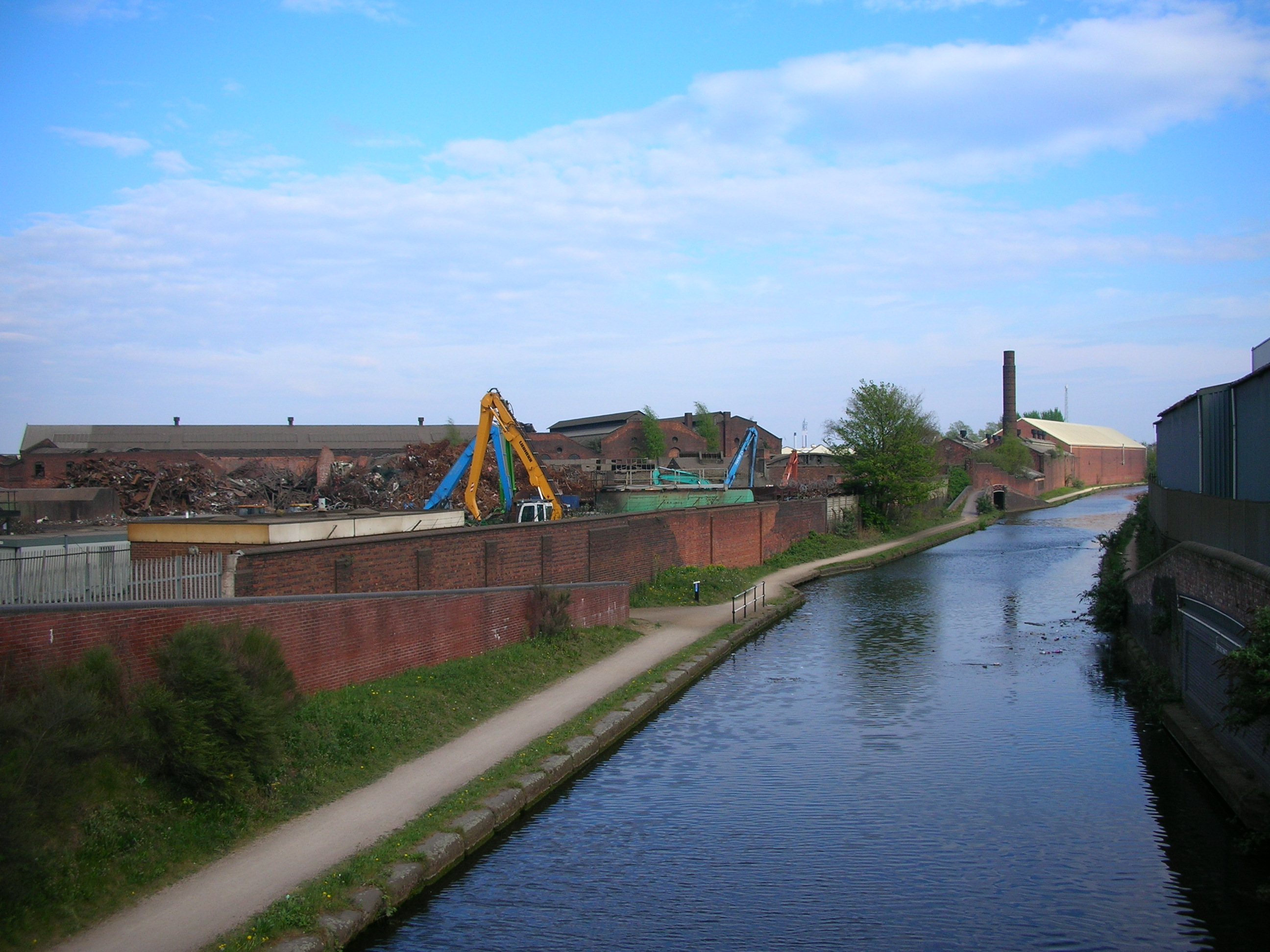
Listed canal roving bridge at entrance to Soho Foundry Loop canal (now dry)

Soho Foundry is a factory created in 1795 by Matthew Boulton and James Watt and their sons Matthew Robinson Boulton and James Watt Jr. at Smethwick, West Midlands, England (grid reference SP037885), for the manufacture of steam engines. Now owned by Avery Weigh-Tronix, it is used for the manufacturing of weighing machines.

The early history of the Soho Foundry is of pivotal importance both to the history of the Industrial Revolution and to the study of the development of management theory. The Soho Foundry stood out from other factories of the day in the sophistication of its planning, its production processes and its management techniques; practising concepts that would not become commonplace until a century later. Comparing its workings to the techniques of mass production and scientific management made famous by Henry Ford and Frederick Winslow Taylor in the United States in the early 20th century, the economist Eric Roll wrote "Neither Taylor, Ford nor any other modern experts devised anything in the way of plan that cannot be discovered at Soho before 1805".

== History ==
The factory was built on the edge of the Birmingham Canal on land bought in 1795. The following year the foundry was open.

=== Organisation ===
The Soho Foundry was planned with a degree of sophistication unprecedented for a factory of its time. Its products were produced out of standardised interchangeable parts, reducing the need to supervise work as it was executed, simplifying stock control and enabling more efficient repair of faults for customers. Production processes were broken down into small tasks, enabling an extremely high degree of specialisation among workers – one document from 1801, for example, describes how a team of four specific workers was "to be constantly employed in fitting nozzles". These tasks took place in a series of workshops spatially located along the flow of production, minimising the expense and time-wastage of the movement of materials through the works.

The accounting procedures of the foundry bore a striking similarity to modern processes, with each of the three main operating departments - the Foundry Department which made cast iron parts, the Smithy Department which made wrought iron parts, and the Fitting Department which machined the parts and assembled them together - being operated as separate profit centres.

The Soho Foundry was also innovative in the field of personnel management, setting up executive development programmes, sickness benefit schemes and welfare programmes.

=== Later development ===
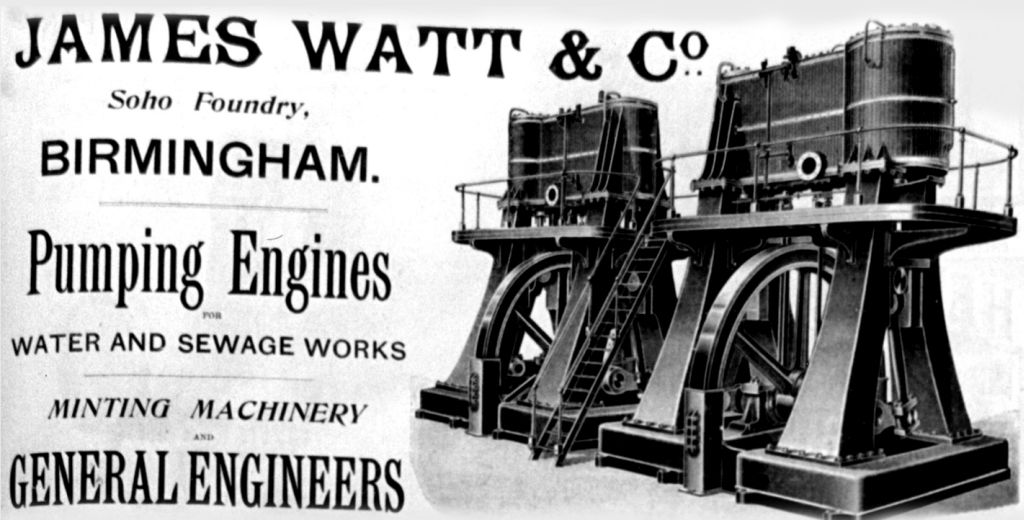
Trade advertisement from the 'James Watt & Co.' era

By 1840 James Watt Jr. owned the factory after the death of the founding Boulton and Watt. He died in 1848 and his place was taken by H. W. Blake and the name changed from Soho Foundry to James Watt & Co..

In 1857 the screw engines for the steamship SS Great Eastern were built at the foundry. In 1860 a new mint was started at the Foundry, the Manufactory having closed in April 1850 by Matthew's grandson, Matthew Piers Watt Boulton.

In 1861 tests were performed at the Soho Foundry for the London Pneumatic Despatch Company.

In 1895 W & T Avery Ltd. acquired the Foundry as a going concern.

In 1912, the manager of the company William Edward Hipkins, died at the sinking of Titanic while he was travelling as a first class passenger. He was 55 and his body was not recovered.

== Today ==
It is now the home of Avery Weigh-Tronix and Avery Berkel, who make weighing scales. The site includes William Murdoch's cottage and overlooks Black Patch Park.

There was a small museum there, open only by appointment, but is now closed.

The grade II listed Pooley gates, of cast iron, are marked with "a Liver bird above ropework draped with cloth, flanked by nautical symbols including oars, flags and bugles, ships' wheels and intersecting dolphins". A plaque reads: "These gates were cast by Henry Pooley and Son about 1840 for the Sailors' Home, Liverpool. The Avery and Pooley Foundries were amalgamated in 1931". There was an active campaign to return these gates to Liverpool, resulting in the approval by Sandwell Council in March 2011 of an application to return them. After restoration the gates were returned to Liverpool on 8 August 2011 and were re-erected under the name "The Sailors Home Gateway" in the pedestrian section of Paradise Street in Liverpool One, close to the original site of the Sailors' Home.

The building is a Grade II* listed building. The gates and adjacent canal bridge are Grade II listed.

The oldest working steam engine, built here, is the Smethwick Engine built to recover water used in the nearby canal locks at Smethwick Summit, and now in Thinktank, Birmingham Science Museum.

== See also ==
- Soho Manufactory
- Liverpool Sailors' Home
- George Haden

== Literature ==
- Gale, W.K.V. (1946). Soho Foundry. Birmingham, England: W & T Avery Ltd. p. 49.
- Gale, W.K.V.; Seaby, W.A. (1966). Boulton, Watt and the Soho Undertakings. Birmingham, England: City of Birmingham Museum and Art Gallery. p. 40.
- Demidowicz, George (2006). "The First Specialised Engine Building Works" (PDF). Warwickshire Industrial Archaeology Society Newsletter (23). Warwickshire, England: Warwickshire Industrial Archaeology Society: 3. Archived from the original (PDF) on 19 July 2011.
- Williams, Robert (1995), Accounting for steam: The accounts of the Soho factory, Accounting & Finance Working Papers, vol. 95/14, Wollongong, NSW: University of Wollongong
