= W. H. Peckitt =

- Occupation: Stamp dealer

William Henry Peckitt FRPSL (died 7 December 1934) was a British stamp dealer and fellow of the Royal Philatelic Society London. He was known as the "Panther of the Strand" for his acute business sense, acquiring most of the collection of the Earl of Crawford as well as Sir William Avery's collection.
