= Avery, Crawford County, Missouri =

Extinct town in the American state of Missouri

Coordinates: 38°3′12″N 91°16′58″W

Avery is an extinct town in eastern Crawford County, in the U.S. state of Missouri. The townsite lies above Avery Hollow about two miles west of Onondaga Cave State Park. Missouri Route MM is adjacent to the site and the Avery cemetery lies between route MM and Avery Hollow.

A post office called Avery was established in 1853, and remained in operation until 1865. The community most likely took its name from Avery Valley, which has the name of a local family.
