= Roberval balance =

A sketch of a Roberval balance showing equal masses off-center on the plates. (This conceptual design, with rigid arms, equal distances, frictionless pivots, and the top 3 pivots colinear, is balanced in any position if the masses are exactly equal. There is no potential energy change if one side is pushed up.)

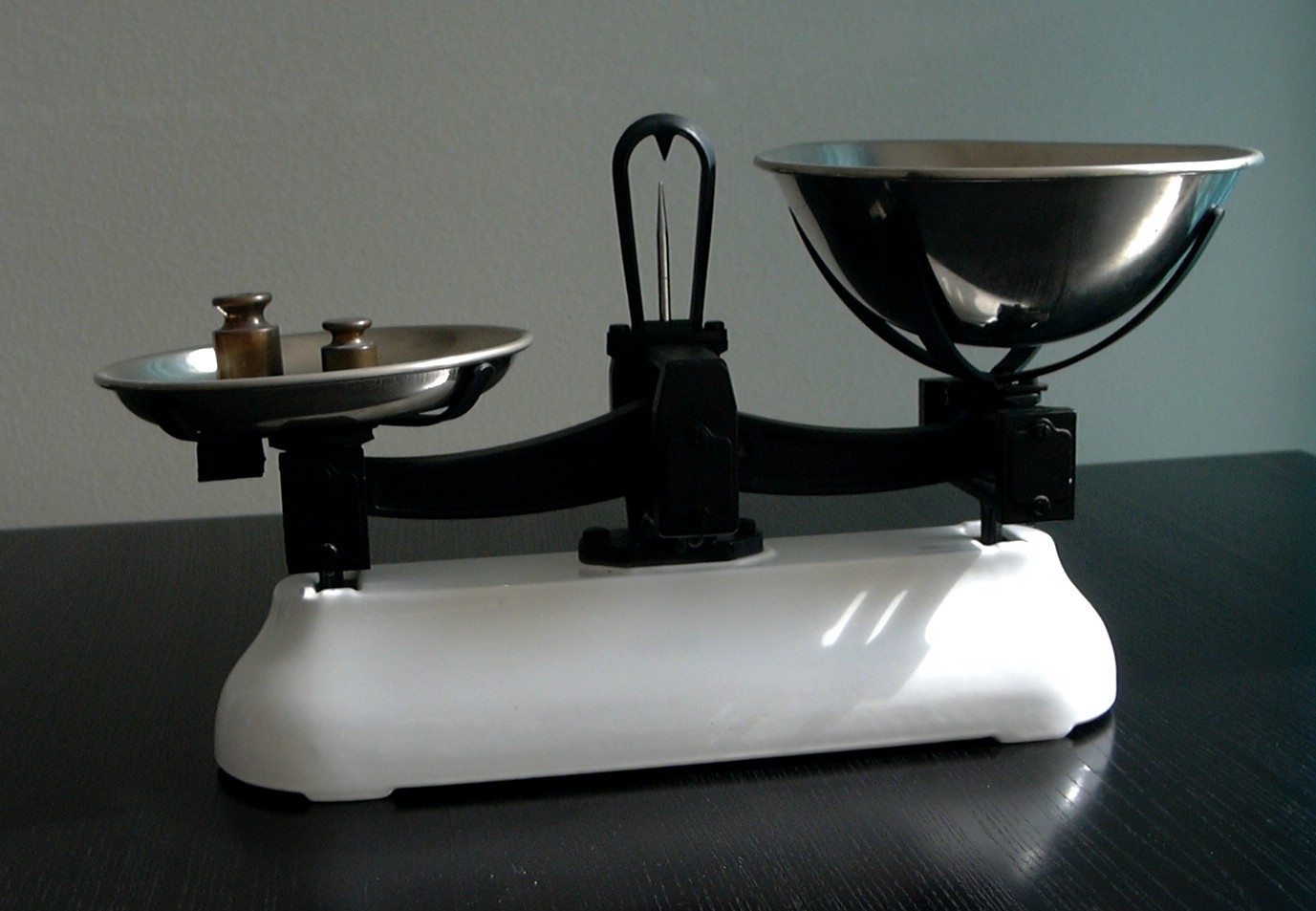
A Roberval balance made by W & T Avery Ltd. in England

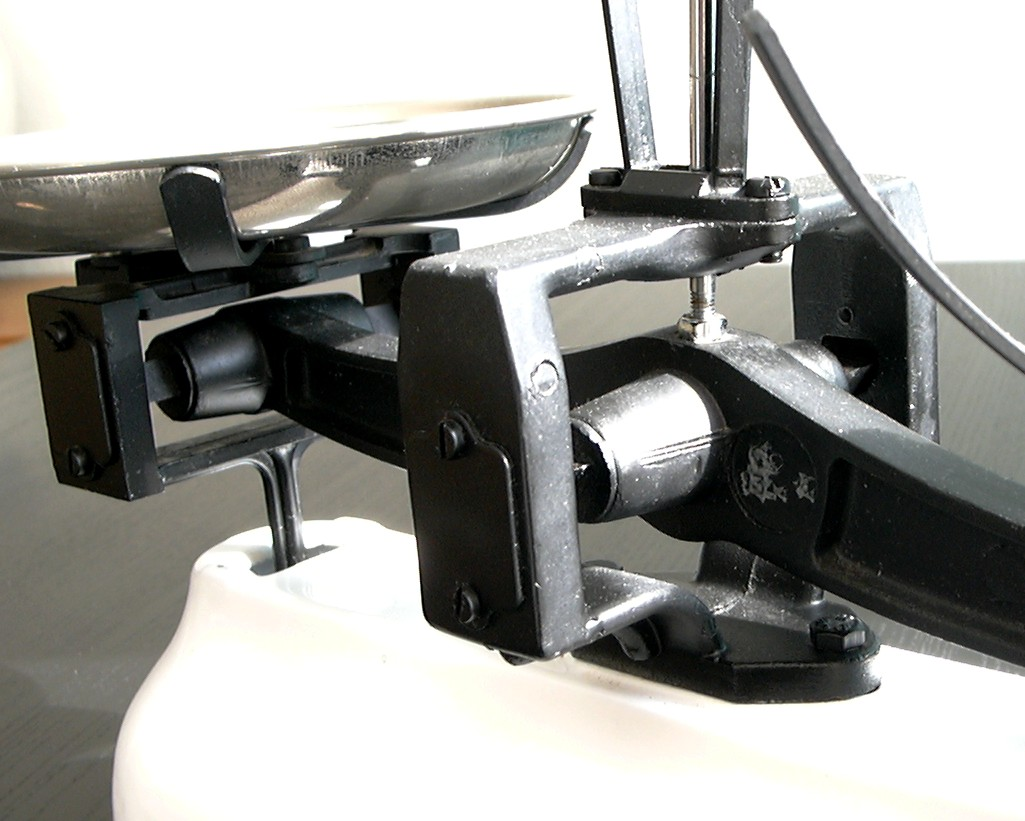
Detail: the bottom horizontal beam is hidden under the protective cover

A Roberval balance shown responding to two masses of equal weight

The Roberval balance is a weighing scale presented to the French Academy of Sciences by the French mathematician Gilles Personne de Roberval in 1669.

In this scale, two identical horizontal beams are attached, one directly above the other, to a vertical column, which is attached to a stable base. On each side, both horizontal beams are attached to a vertical beam. The six attachment points are pivots. Two horizontal plates, suitable for placing objects to be weighed, are fixed to the top of the two vertical beams. An arrow on the lower horizontal beam (and perpendicular to it) and a mark on the vertical column may be added to aid in leveling the scale.

The object to be weighed is placed on one plate, and calibrated masses are added to and subtracted from the other plate until level is reached. The mass of the object is equal to the mass of the calibrated masses regardless of where on the plates the items are placed. Since the vertical beams are always vertical, and the weighing platforms always horizontal, the potential energy lost by a weight as its platform goes down a certain distance will always be the same, so it makes no difference where the weight is placed. For maximum accuracy, Roberval balances require that their top fulcrum be placed on the line between the left and right pivot so that tipping will not result in the net transfer of weight to either the left or right side of the scale: a fulcrum placed below the ideal pivot point will tend to cause a net shift in the direction of any downward-moving vertical column (in a kind of positive feedback loop); likewise, a fulcrum placed above this point will tend to level out the arms of the balance rather than respond to small changes in weight (in a negative feedback loop).

An off-center weight on the plate exerts a downward force and a torque on the vertical column supporting the plate. The downward force is carried by the bearing at the top beam in most balance scales, the lower beam just being supported horizontally at midpoint by the body of the scales by a simple peg-in-slot arrangement, so it effectively hangs beneath the top beam and stops the platforms from rotating. The torque on the column is taken by a pair of equal and opposite forces in the horizontal beams. If the offset weight sits toward the outside of the platform, further from the centre of the scales, the top beam will be in tension and the bottom beam will be in compression. These tensions and compressions are carried by horizontal reactions from the central supports; the other side of the scales is not affected at all, nor is the balance of the scales.

== Principles of operation ==
Certain presumptions are made in a theoretical Roberval balance. In order for such a balance to appear level in its natural state and be able to balance theoretical masses, the following must be true:

- All six pivot points must move without producing friction (since Roberval balances often actually require twice this number, a total of 12 pivot points would need to be friction free)
- The lengths of the arms (left and right of the fulcrum) must be exactly equal unless

- The weights of the arms themselves are unequal, or
- The weights of the vertical columns and/or pans is unequal

- The vertical distance between each vertical set of pivot points must be exactly the same
- In order to be balanced front-to-back the balance must either have two sets of two arms located around a central fulcrum or must have two fulcra supporting a single set of arms
- The weight of the arms on each side of the fulcrum must be equal (unless see above)
- The arms must be rigid and inflexible
- Gravitational force or rotational G force must be acting uniformly on the balance
- If the weight of the pan above either vertical column is itself greater than zero and any weight placed on that pan is off-center then that pan's tendency to tilt will cause the balance to exist in a state of tension at the pivot points below that pan. This tension will manifest as an increase in static friction.
- The longer the arms generally, the more sensitive the balance, though longer arms usually entail greater arm weight, which tends to decrease sensitivity
- Heavier pans and vertical columns also tend to decrease sensitivity
- Sensitivity lost by increases in either arm weight or pan/column weight can be counteracted only through decreased static friction in the pivot points
- The upper pivot point of the central supporting column is prevented from moving left–right and front–back by the fulcrum itself; it is prevented from moving up–down by gravitational pull. The lower pivot point of this column must be held in place so that it cannot sway left–right and, to a lesser extent, front–back as the arms move, but it experiences no up–down movement forces — in this arrangement, the entire pivot process takes place on the upper central pivot point, which acts as the single fulcrum for the entire balance; it is possible to reverse this, so that the lower pivot point acts as the fulcrum and the upper is only held in place so that it cannot sway left–right or front/back.
- Roberval balances are frequently depicted with the "pan" as a plate or peg protruding from the center of each vertical column— this is so that the balance can have a center of gravity that is in the actual center of the parallelogram and so that adding weights to these plates does not change that center of gravity. This produces the somewhat odd result that a correctly balanced Roberval balance, unlike a beam balance, can be "balanced" in any arm position: so long as the masses of the objects on both sides are equal or the pans are empty, it will balance with the right arm up and the left arm down, as well as the left up and the right down, as well as any position in between, and all of these positions will be "correctly balanced".

- As a corollary, because no actual two masses can have exactly the same weight, a highly precise Roberval balance measuring two such imprecise masses should always tip either completely to the left or completely to the right— it does not measure degree of difference, it indicates the existence of difference. These effects must be distinguished from the feedback loops and the friction of the pivot points mentioned above, as those are undesirable effects caused by design weaknesses or flaws.

- The correct method of using a precise but real Roberval balance, then, is to place one of masses (either the known or the unknown) on one plate/pan and then add only enough of the other mass to the other pan until the balance just barely tips completely in the direction of the second added mass. If the arms finalize in a horizontal position, this only indicates friction in the pivot points somewhere. A well-made and precise Roberval balance with a centralized center of gravity never actually "balances".

== Accuracy ==
The Roberval balance is arguably less accurate and more difficult to manufacture than a beam balance with suspended plates. The beam balance, however, has the significant disadvantage of requiring suspensory strings, chains, or rods. For over three hundred years the Roberval balance has instead been popular for applications requiring convenience and only moderate accuracy, notably in retail trade.

== Manufacturers ==
Well known manufacturers of Roberval balances include W & T Avery Ltd. and George Salter & Co. Ltd. in the United Kingdom and Trayvou in France. Henry Troemner, who designed scales for the United States Department of Treasury, was the first American to use the design.

== Bibliography ==
- J. T. Graham, Scales and Balances, Shire Publications, Aylesbury (1981) ISBN 0-85263-547-8
- Bruno Kisch, Scales and Weights. A Historical Outline, Yale University Press, New Haven (1966) ISBN 0-300-00630-6
