= W & T Avery =

British weighing machine manufacturer

GEC Avery
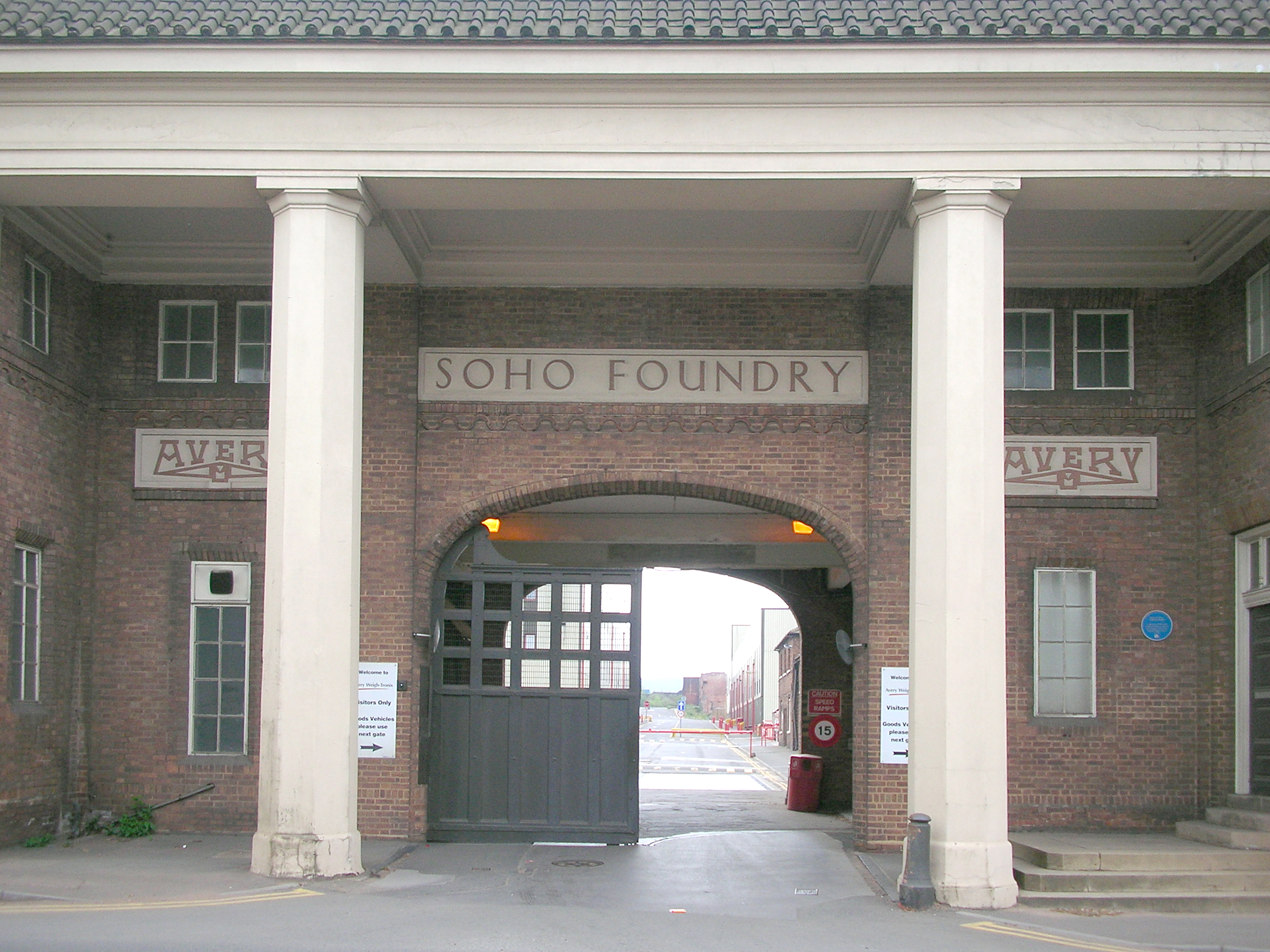
- Main gate to the Soho Foundry, the company's head office
- Formerly: W & T Avery (until 1979)
- Industry: Weighing machines
- Defunct: 2000
- Fate: Acquired by Weigh-Tronix to form Avery Weigh-Tronix
- Successor: Avery Weigh-Tronix
- Headquarters: Birmingham, United Kingdom
- Parent: General Electric Company (1979–1993); Avery Berkel (General Electric Company) (1993–2000)

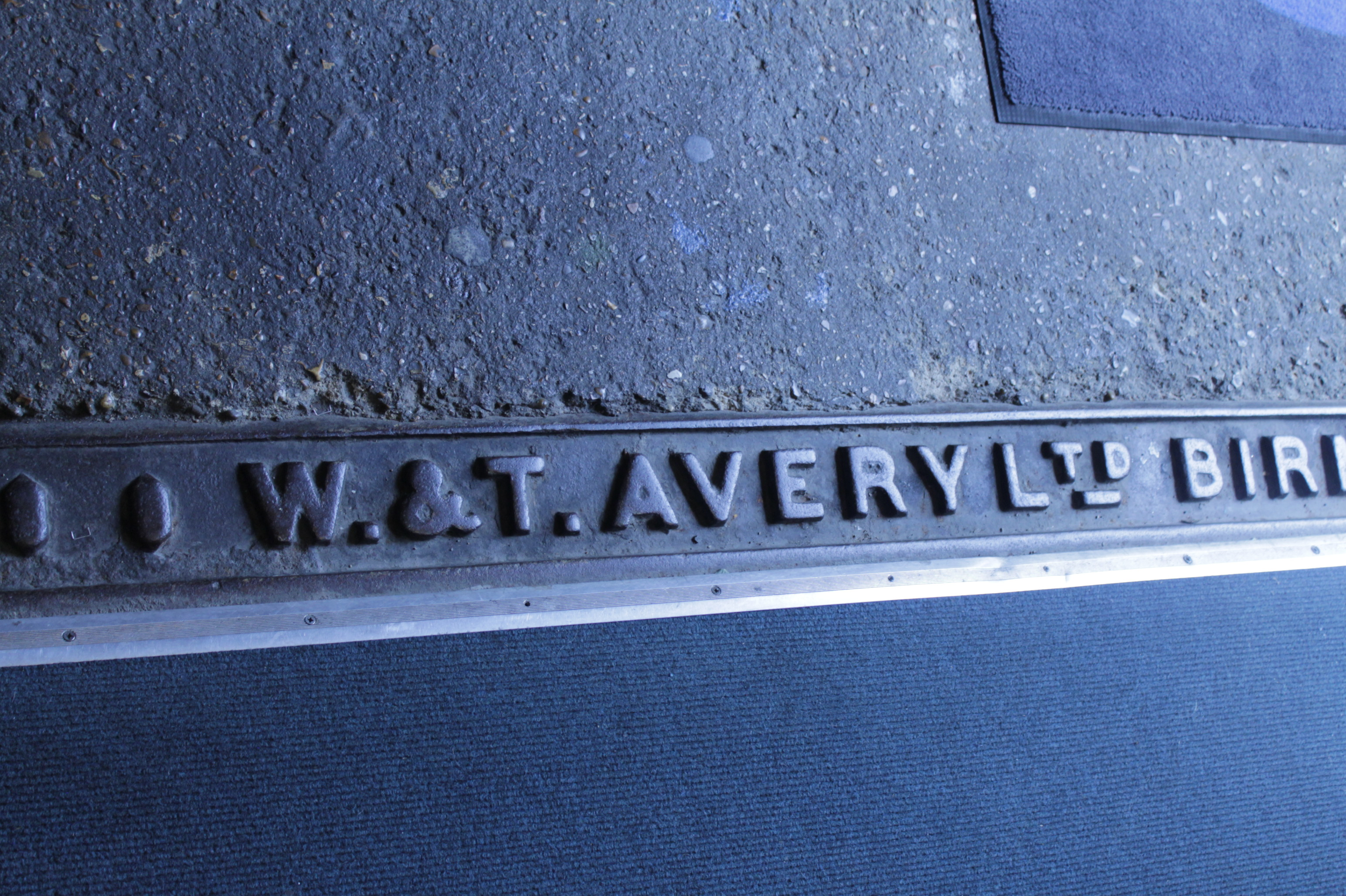
Edge of a weighbridge by W & T Avery 1910

W & T Avery Ltd. (later GEC Avery) was a British manufacturer of weighing machines. The company was founded in the early 18th century and took the name W & T Avery in 1818. Having been taken over by GEC in 1979 the company was later renamed into GEC-Avery. The company became Avery Berkel in 1993 when GEC acquired the Dutch company Berkel. After the take over by Weigh-Tronix in 2000 the company was again renamed to be called Avery Weigh-Tronix with Avery Berkel continuing to operate as a brand. The company is based in Smethwick, West Midlands, United Kingdom.

== History ==
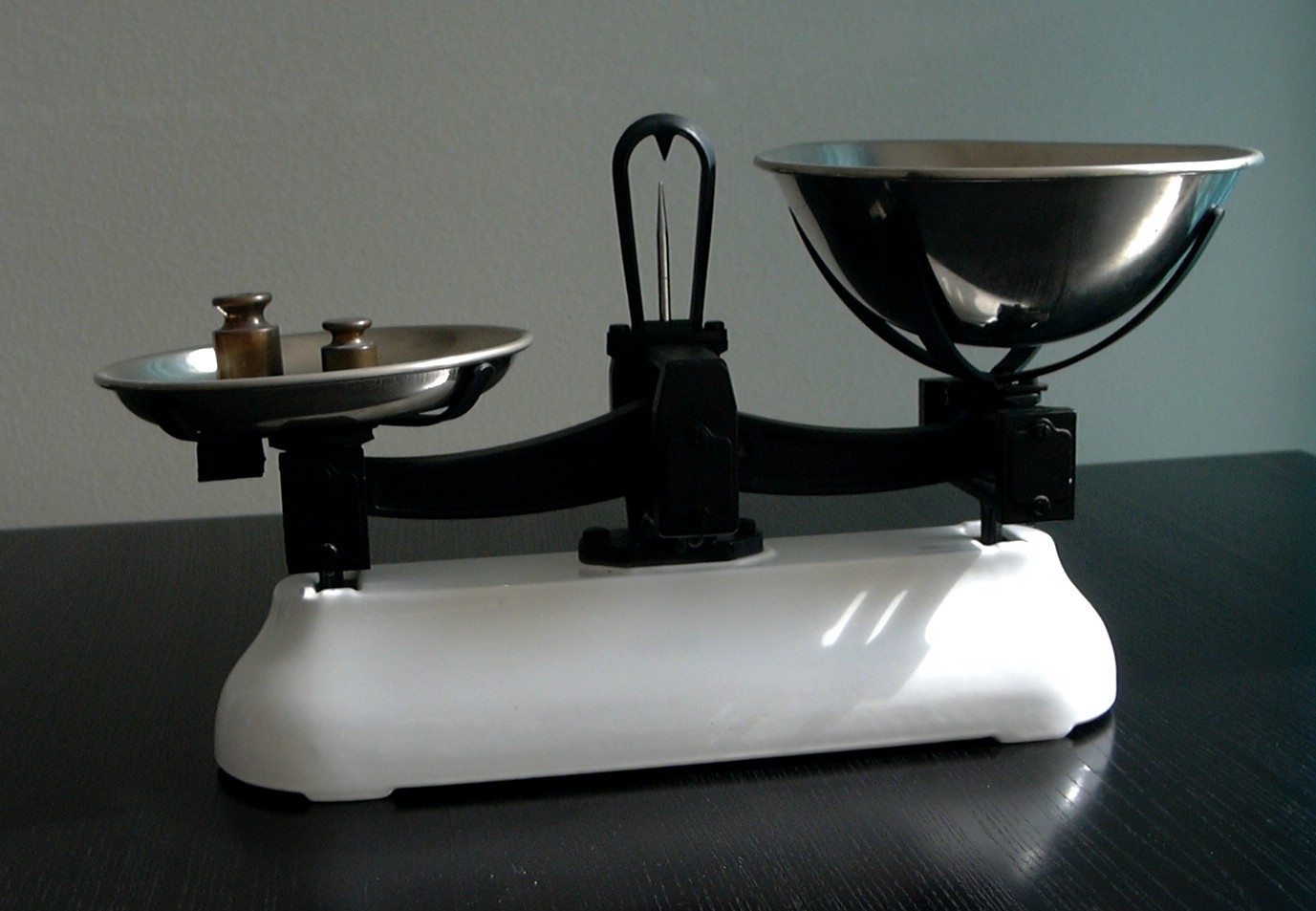
Set of scales made by Avery early 20th century

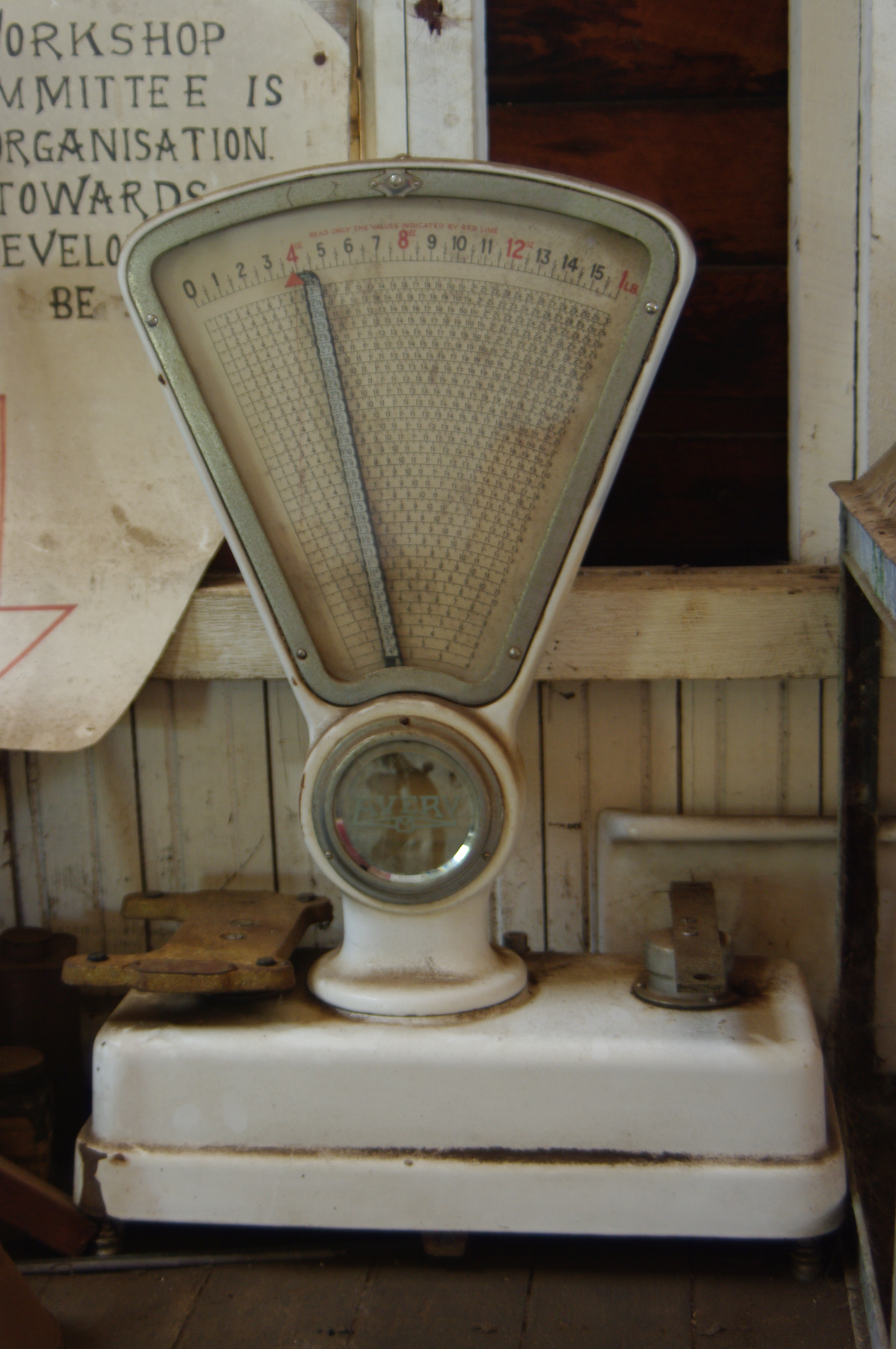
Set of scales made by Avery in the 1960s

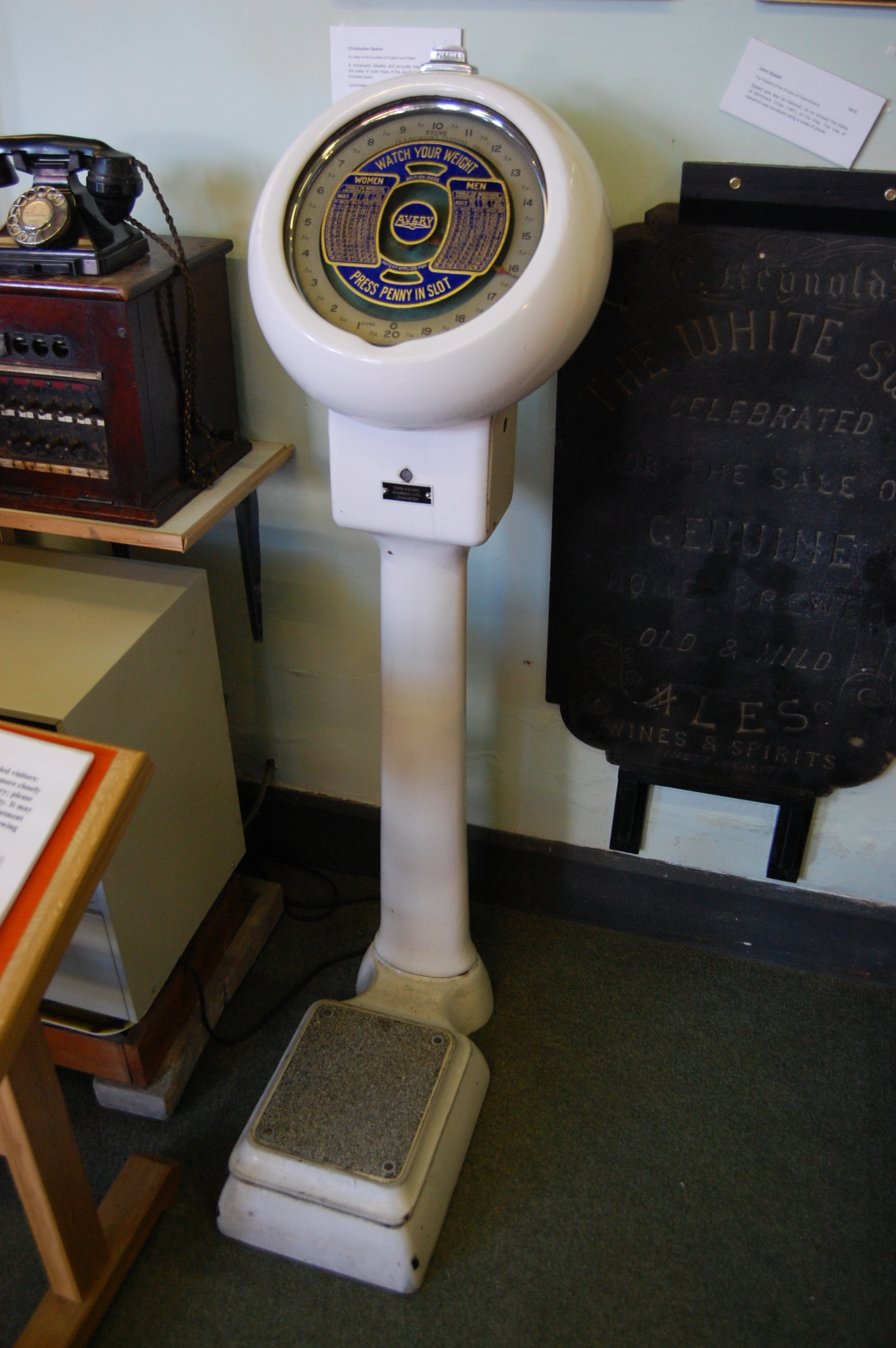
An Avery weighing machine, for weighing a person, now in Leominster Museum

The undocumented origin of the company goes back to 1730 when James Ford established the business in Digbeth. On Joseph Balden the then owner's death in 1813 William and Thomas Avery took over his scalemaking business and in 1818 renamed it W & T Avery. The business rapidly expanded and in 1885 they owned three factories: the Atlas Works in West Bromwich, the Mill Lane Works in Birmingham and the Moat Lane Works in Digbeth. In 1891 the business became a limited company with a board of directors and in 1894 the shares were quoted on the London Stock Exchange. In 1895 the company bought the legendary Soho Foundry in Smethwick, a former steam engine factory owned by James Watt & Co. In 1897 the move was complete and the steam engine business was gradually converted to pure manufacture of weighing machines. The turn of the century was marked by managing director William Hipkins' determined efforts to broaden the renown of the Avery brand and transform the business into a specialist manufacturer of weighing machines. By 1914 the company occupied an area of 32,000 m² and had some 3000 employees.

In the inter-war period, the growth continued with the addition of specialised shops for cast parts, enamel paints and weighbridge assembly and the product range diversified into counting machines, testing machines, automatic packing machines and petrol pumps. During the second world war the company also produced various types of heavy guns. At that time the site underwent severe damage from parachute mines and incendiary bombs, some of many which landed on the town of Smethwick.

From 1931 to 1973 the company occupied the 18th-century Middlesex Sessions House in Clerkenwell as its headquarters.

Changes in weighing machine technology after World War II led to the closure of the foundry, the introduction of load cells and electronic weighing with the simultaneous gradual disappearance of purely mechanical devices.

After almost a century of national and international expansion the company was taken over by GEC in 1979. Keith Hodgkinson, managing director at the time, completed the turn-around from mechanical to electronic weighing with a complete overhaul of the product range of retail scales and industrial platform scales. Avery Berkel started in 1993 when the British conglomerate General Electric Company combined their GEC Avery (formerly W & T Avery) business with the newly acquired Berkel company. The group continued as a subsidiary of GEC (and later Marconi plc) until March 2000 when the business was in turn acquired for £102.5 million by the US-American company Weigh-Tronix to form Avery Weigh-Tronix. Avery Berkel continued to operate as a brand of the newly created company with GEC Avery being absorbed by the Avery Berkel brand. Avery Berkel continued as the commercial brand of Avery Weigh-Tronix.

In September 2007, Illinois Tool Works acquired Avery Berkel from Avery Weigh-Tronix. Illinois Tool Works acquired Avery Weigh-Tronix one year later, but kept the two companies separate.

In 2015, the Avery museum, which had existed for almost nine decades, was closed and the collection dispersed. Avery Berkel is a brand and major manufacturer of commercial weighing machines owned by Illinois Tool Works.

== Products ==
The Avery Berkel product range includes:

- ValuMax scale
- CodeChecker
- Intelligent Shelf Edge Labels (iSEL)
- Allergen labelling compliance
- Self-Service AI
- Linerless auto-cutter

== Acquisitions ==
The company has made several large acquisition over the years that help contribute to its large size.

- 1895 James Watt & Co
- 1899 Parnall & Sons Ltd.
- 1920/1928 Southall and Smith Ltd.
- 1920 Saml. Denison & Son Ltd. (name changed to Avery-Denison Ltd. in 1970)
- 1925 Oertling Ltd.
- 1931 The Tan Sad Chair Co. (1931) Ltd.
- 1932 Avery-Hardoll Ltd.
- 1953/1976 Pump Maintenance Ltd.
- 1959 Geo Driver & Son Ltd.; merged in 1966 with Southall and Smith Ltd. to form Driver Southall Ltd.
- 1968 Stanton Redcroft Ltd.
- 1973 Telomex Ltd.

At some point, the company owned Haseley Manor, in Warwickshire.

== See also ==
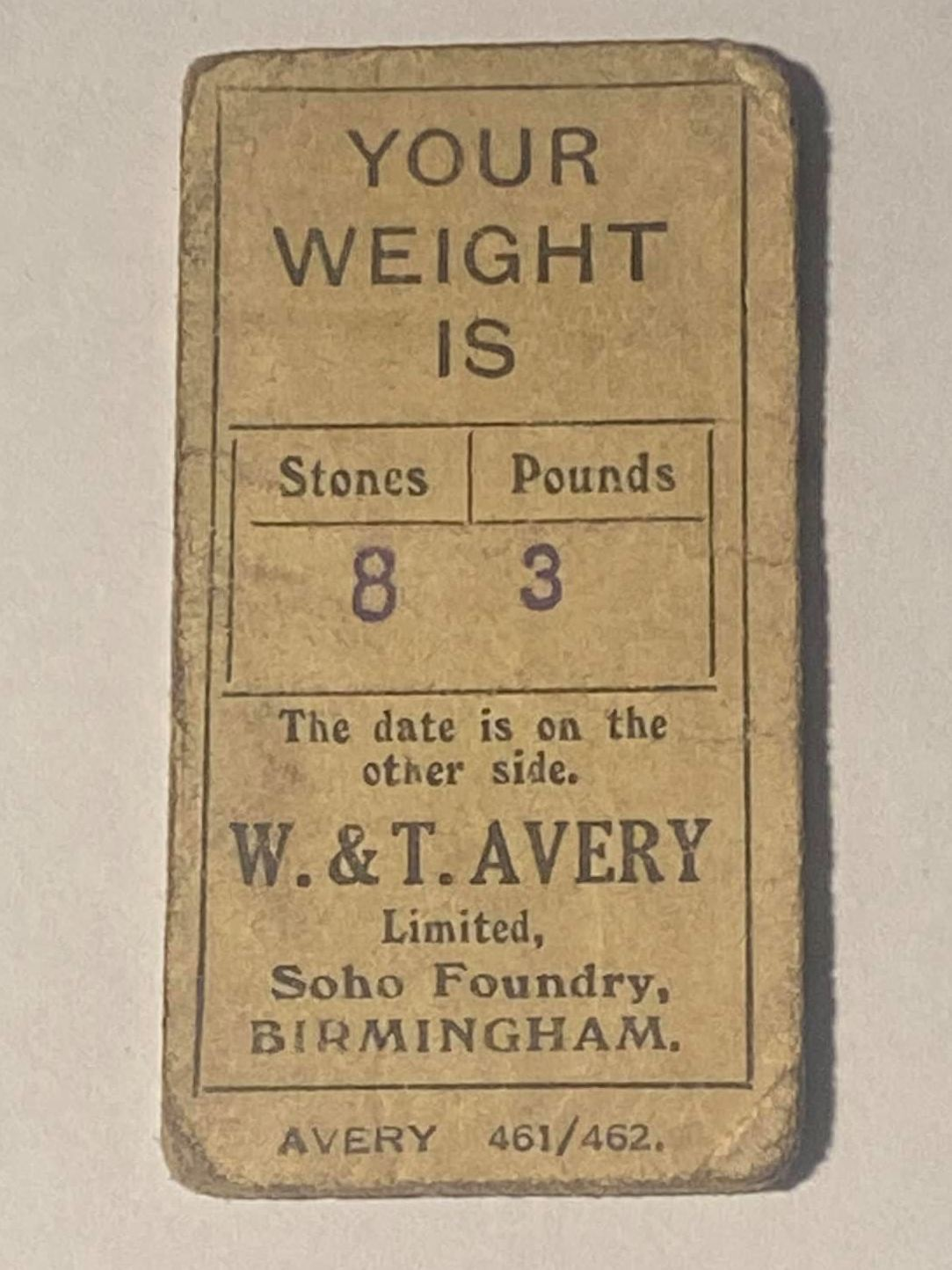
Ticket from a W. & T Avery weighing machine, dated on reverse, 26 July 1929

- Roberval Balance
- Weighbridge
- Sir William Beilby Avery

== Literature ==
- Ernest Pendarves Leigh-Bennett, Weighing the World: an impression after two hundred years of the past history of an English house of business, and of its present activities and influence throughout the world of weighing, 1730–1930, Birmingham, 1930
- Walter Keith Vernon Gale, Soho Foundry, Birmingham, 1948
- Monopolies and Mergers Commission, The General Electric Company Limited and Averys Limited: a report on the proposed merger, London, 1979, ISBN 0-10-176530-4
- L H Broadbent, "The Avery Business (1730–1918)", W & T Avery, Birmingham, 1949
