= Gilles de Roberval =

French mathematician (1602–1675)

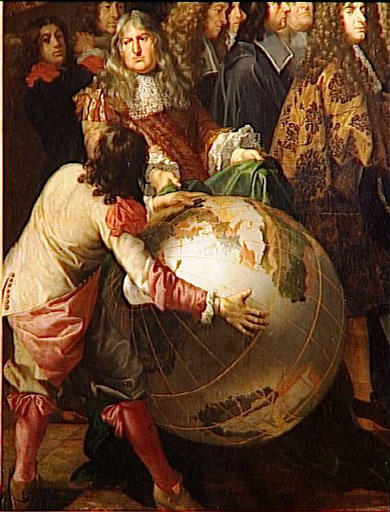
- Portrait of Gilles Personne de Roberval (1602-1675) at the inauguration of the French Academy of Sciences, 1666, where he was a founding member.
- Born: August 10, 1602; Roberval near Beauvais, France
- Died: October 27, 1675 (aged 73); Paris, France
- Known for: Roberval Balance; Coining the term 'trochoid'
- Scientific career
- Fields: Mathematician
- Workplaces: Gervais College, Paris; Royal College of France
- Academic advisors: Étienne Pascal; Marin Mersenne
- Notable students: François du Verdus; Isaac Barrow

Gilles Personne de Roberval (August 10, 1602 – October 27, 1675) was a French mathematician born at Roberval near Beauvais, France. His name was originally Gilles Personne or Gilles Personier, with Roberval the place of his birth.

== Biography ==
Like René Descartes, he was present at the Siege of La Rochelle in 1627. In the same year he went to Paris, and in 1631 he was appointed the philosophy chair at Gervais College, Paris. In 1634, he was also made the chair of mathematics at the Royal College of France. A condition of tenure attached to this particular chair was that the holder (Roberval, in this case) would propose mathematical questions for solution, and should resign in favour of any person who solved them better than himself. Notwithstanding this, Roberval was able to keep the chair until his death.

Roberval was one of those mathematicians who, just before the invention of the infinitesimal calculus, occupied their attention with problems which are only soluble, or can be most easily solved, by some method involving limits or infinitesimals, which would today be solved by calculus. He worked on the quadrature of surfaces and the cubature of solids, which he accomplished, in some of the simpler cases, by an original method which he called the "Method of Indivisibles"; but he lost much of the credit of the discovery as he kept his method for his own use, while Bonaventura Cavalieri published a similar method which he independently invented.

Another of Roberval’s discoveries was a very general method of drawing tangents, by considering a curve as described by a moving point whose motion is the resultant of several simpler motions. He also discovered a method of deriving one curve from another, by means of which finite areas can be obtained equal to the areas between certain curves and their asymptotes. To these curves, which were also applied to effect some quadratures, Evangelista Torricelli gave the name "Robervallian lines."

Between Roberval and René Descartes there existed a feeling of ill-will, owing to the jealousy aroused in the mind of the former by the criticism that Descartes offered to some of the methods employed by him and by Pierre de Fermat; and this led him to criticize and oppose the analytical methods that Descartes introduced into geometry about this time.

As results of Roberval’s labours outside of pure mathematics may be noted a work on the system of the universe, in which he supports the Copernican heliocentric system and attributes a mutual attraction to all particles of matter and also the invention of a special kind of balance, the Roberval Balance.

== Works ==
- Traité de Mécanique des Poids Soutenus par des Puissances sur des Plans Inclinés à l’Horizontale (1636).
- Le Système du Monde d’après Aristarque de Samos (1644).
- Divers Ouvrages de M. de Roberval (1693).

== Sources ==
- Mitchell, U. G. (1933). "Review: A Study of the Traité des Indivisibles of Gilles Persone de Roberval, by Evelyn Walker". Bull. Amer. Math. Soc. 33 (9): 658–659. doi:10.1090/S0002-9904-1933-05710-5.
- Auger, Léon (1962). Un Savant Méconnu, Gilles Personne de Roberval. Paris: Librairie Scientifique A. Blanchard.
- Cousin, Victor (1845). "Roberval Philosophe," Journal des Savants, pp. 129–149.
