= Avery Weigh-Tronix =

Avery Weigh-Tronix, Ltd.; Avery Weigh-Tronix, LLC
- Type: Subsidiary
- Industry: Industrial weighing machines
- Predecessor: Avery Berkel; Weigh-Tronix
- Founded: June 2000 (as Avery Weigh-Tronix)
- Headquarters: Smethwick, West Midlands, United Kingdom
- Brands: Brecknell
- Parent: Illinois Tool Works (2008–current)
- Website: www.averyweigh-tronix.com

Avery Weigh-Tronix is a subsidiary of Illinois Tool Works specialising in industrial weighing machines. Its headquarters stands on the site of the Soho Foundry in Smethwick, West Midlands, England. The company additionally has a United States–based manufacturing and retail manufacturing plant. The company is one of the largest suppliers of weighing devices. The company is registered as Avery Weigh-Tronix, Ltd. in the UK and Avery Weigh-Tronix, LLC in the US.

== History ==
The company was formed in June 2000 when the U.S.-based weighing company Weigh-Tronix acquired the Avery Berkel group of companies. Avery Berkel was the result of the merger between GEC Avery (formally W & T Avery) and Berkel.

Avery Weigh-Tronix was the parent company in the group with every other company (including Avery Berkel) being brands of Avery Weigh-Tronix. Avery Weigh-Tronix was used as the industrial brand of the company.

In September 2007, Illinois Tool Works acquired Avery Berkel from Avery Weigh-Tronix.

In September 2008, Illinois Tool Works acquires Avery Weigh-Tronix, Avery Berkel and Avery Weigh-Tronix were kept separate with Avery Weigh-Tronix focusing more on the industrial and commercial and Avery Berkel focusing on retail.
