= Michael de Torby =

Count Michael Mikhailovich
- Count de Torby
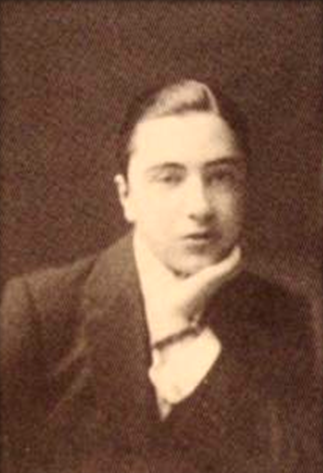
- Born: 8 October 1898; Wiesbaden, Germany
- Died: 25 April 1959 (aged 60); London, United Kingdom
- House: House of Holstein-Gottorp-Romanov-Torby
- Father: Grand Duke Michael Mikhailovich of Russia
- Mother: Countess Sophie of Merenberg

Count Michael Mikhailovich de Torby (8 October 1898 – 25 April 1959) was a Russo-German nobleman, an artist living in the United Kingdom.

== Early life and ancestry ==
Born as the only son of Grand Duke Michael Mikhailovich of Russia (1861–1929), exiled member of the House of Romanov, and his morganatic wife Countess Sophie of Merenberg (1868–1927), descendant of the House of Nassau-Weilburg. He was the great-grandson of Emperor Nicholas I of Russia and Russian poet and novelist, Alexander Pushkin.

== Biography ==
Count Mikhail Mikhailovich de Torby was the youngest child and only son of Grand Duke Mikhail Mikhailovich and his morganatic wife Countess Sophie von Merenberg. The marriage was not only morganatic but also illegal under the Imperial house laws and caused a scandal at the Russian court. The Grand Duke was forbidden to return to Russia for life so he moved to England.

Mikhail was educated at Eton College. While there, he contracted measles, and went to Switzerland to recover. While there, he began displaying symptoms of his bipolar disorder, and later he later lived in a mental hospital in Uxbridge. A gifted artist, his work is distinguished by "pleasant colours and free style." He had a special fondness for Chinese subjects and their works created mainly on rice paper in a thin Chinese-style. He was a collector of Chinese porcelain, which he often portrayed in his still lifes. He also served as a theatre artist.

He took British citizenship in 1938, when he was forty years old.

He died 25 April 1959 without issue.

== Ancestry ==
Ancestors of Michael de Torby

16. Paul I of Russia
8. Nicholas I of Russia
17. Duchess Sophie Dorothea of Württemberg
4. Grand Duke Michael Nikolaevich of Russia
18. Frederick William III of Prussia
9. Princess Charlotte of Prussia
19. Duchess Louise of Mecklenburg-Strelitz
2. Grand Duke Michael Mikhailovich of Russia
20. Charles Frederick, Grand Duke of Baden
10. Leopold, Grand Duke of Baden
21. Luise Karoline Geyer von Geyersberg
5. Princess Cecilie of Baden
22. Gustav IV Adolf of Sweden
11. Princess Sophie of Sweden
23. Princess Frederica of Baden
1. Count Michael Mikhailovich de Torby
24. Frederick William, Prince of Nassau-Weilburg
12. William, Duke of Nassau
25. Burgravine Louise Isabelle of Kirchberg
6. Prince Nikolaus Wilhelm of Nassau
26. Prince Paul of Württemberg
13. Princess Pauline of Württemberg
27. Princess Katharina Charlotte of Saxe-Hildburghausen
3. Countess Sophie of Merenberg
28. Sergei Lvovich Pushkin
14. Alexander Pushkin
29. Nadezhda Ossipovna Hannibal
7. Natalya Alexandrovna Pushkina
30. Nikolay Afanasievich Goncharov
15. Natalya Nikolaevna Goncharova
31. Natalia Ivanovna Zagriajskaya
