= Clotilde von Merenberg =

German psychiatrist and last patrilineal descendant of the House of Nassau (born 1941)

Clotilde Gräfin von Merenberg
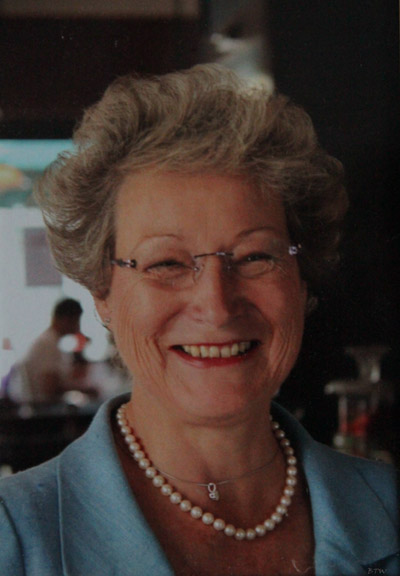
- Born: 14 May 1941 (age 85); Wiesbaden, Germany
- Occupation: Psychiatrist
- Relatives: Enno von Rintelen (in-law)

Clotilde Gräfin von Merenberg (born 14 May 1941 in Wiesbaden, Germany) is a German psychiatrist and the last patrilineal descendant of the House of Nassau. She is a descendant of Emperor Alexander II of Russia and of the Russian poet Alexander Pushkin.

== Family ==
A psychiatrist, Clotilde Gräfin von Merenberg is the only child of Count George von Merenberg (1897–1965) and Elisabeth Müller-Uri (1903–1963), who belonged to the prominent Thuringian Müller-Uri glassmaking family from Lauscha and Sonneberg (cf. German glassmakers Ludwig Müller-Uri and Richard Müller-Uri). She is the last patrilineal descendant of the House of Nassau, the male line of which ruled the Duchy of Nassau until 1866, provided a 12th-century German king, a line of Princes of Orange who served first as stadholders of the United Dutch Provinces and, from 1815 to 1948, as kings of the Netherlands, and reigned as grand dukes of Luxembourg until 1968. Neither she, however, nor her father or paternal grandfather were deemed full members of the Nassau dynasty, the last member of which, Grand Duchess Charlotte of Luxembourg, died in 1985. While Countess Clothilde's branch of the family had legitimate male members until 1965, they had been bypassed for Luxembourg's throne since 1907.

The Counts von Merenberg descend legitimately from the morganatic marriage in 1868 of Prince Nikolaus Wilhelm of Nassau and Natalia Alexandrovna Pushkina, a daughter of the renowned poet Alexander Pushkin, who was an untitled member of the Russian nobility. Although their son Count George von Merenberg married Princess Olga Alexandrovna Yurievskaya, a daughter of Tsar Alexander II of Russia, and pressed for recognition as heir presumptive to the Luxembourgeois throne as its grand ducal line approached extinction, a 1907 law of the grand duchy dismissed the Merenbergs' claim to the throne.

Prince Nikolaus was a great-grandson of Charles Christian, 3rd Prince of Nassau-Weilburg, who in 1760 married Princess Carolina of Orange-Nassau, a daughter of the Dutch stadholder William IV, Prince of Orange and Anne, Princess Royal of Great Britain. Countess Clotilde is also a great-granddaughter of the Russian Emperor Alexander II.

=== Marriage and children ===
In 1965, she married Enno von Rintelen (9 November 1921, Berlin-Charlottenburg – 16 October 2013), a gynecologist, son of Junker Emil Viktor von Rintelen (1887–1954) and Antonie Bracht (1893–1922). He was a grandson of Wilhelm von Rintelen, a Prussian Lieutenant general ennobled in 1913 by German Emperor Wilhelm II.

Clotilde and Enno have three sons:

- Alexander Enno von Rintelen (born Wiesbaden, 23 March 1966).
- Georg Nicolaus von Rintelen (born Wiesbaden, 29 June 1970) He married on 30 June 2007 Olivia Minninger (born Cologne, 27 August 1969), daughter of Günther Minninger and Monika Kleineberg. They have two sons:
  - Julian Dominic Nicolaus von Rintelen (born Munich, 7 January 2003)
  - Nicolai Philip Leonid von Rintelen (born 17 November 2006)
- Gregor von Rintelen (born Wiesbaden, 13 August 1972). He married in 2002 Christiane Mathilde zu Bentheim-Tecklenburg-Rheda-Prill (born Wiesbaden, 18 May 1973), daughter of Fiedebert zu Bentheim-Tecklenburg-Rheda-Prill and Rosemarie Heihecker. They have a son and a daughter:
  - Frederick Enno Christian von Rintelen (born 11 December 2006)
  - Luise von Rintelen (born Braine-l'Alleud, Belgium, 30 June 2009)

Clotilde is the chairwoman of the German Pushkin society and also the chairwoman of the Herus e.V. - Hessisch-russischer interkultureller Austausch und humanitäre Hilfe.

== Ancestry ==
Ancestors of Clotilde von Merenberg

16. William, Duke of Nassau
8. Prince Nikolaus Wilhelm of Nassau
17. Princess Pauline of Württemberg
4. Count Georg Nikolaus von Merenberg
18. Alexander Pushkin
9. Natalia Alexandrovna Pushkina
19. Natalia Goncharova
2. Count Georg Michael von Merenberg
20. Nicholas I of Russia
10. Alexander II of Russia
21. Princess Charlotte of Prussia
5. Princess Olga Alexandrovna Yurievskaya
22. Prince Michael Dolgorukov
11. Princess Catherine Dolgorukova
23. Vera Vishnevskaya
1. Clotilde, Countess von Merenberg
6. Friedrich Anton Müller-Uri
3. Elisabeth Anne Müller-Uri
7. Sophie Elisabeth Burkhardt

Patrilineal descent of Clotilde Countess von Merenberg
1. Drutwin (mentioned 881)
2. Drutwin (mentioned 940-959)
3. Drutwin, Count in Königssundergau (mentioned 991-997)
4. Adelhart, Vogt in Haiger (mentioned 1048)
5. Rupert of Laurenburg (ca. 1050 - c. 1110)
6. Dudo of Laurenburg (ca. 1060 – ca. 1123)
7. Rupert I, Count of Laurenburg (ca. 1090 – ca. 1154)
8. Walram I, Count of Nassau (ca. 1146–1198)
9. Henry II, Count of Nassau (ca. 1190–1251)
10. Walram II, Count of Nassau (ca. 1220-1276)
11. Adolf of Nassau, King of Germany (ca. 1255-1298)
12. Gerlach I, Count of Nassau (ca. 1280-1361)
13. John I, Count of Nassau-Weilburg (1309-1371)
14. Philipp I, Count of Nassau-Weilburg (1368-1429)
15. Philip II, Count of Nassau-Weilburg (1418-1492)
16. John III, Count of Nassau-Weilburg (1441-1480)
17. Louis I, Count of Nassau-Weilburg (1473-1523)
18. Philip III, Count of Nassau-Weilburg (1504-1559)
19. Albert, Count of Nassau-Weilburg (1537-1593)
20. Louis II, Count of Nassau-Weilburg (1565-1627)
21. Ernest Casimir, Count of Nassau-Weilburg (1607-1655)
22. Frederick, Count of Nassau-Weilburg (1640-1675)
23. John Ernst, 1st Prince of Nassau-Weilburg (1664-1719)
24. Charles August, 2nd Prince of Nassau-Weilburg (1685-1753)
25. Charles Christian, 3rd Prince of Nassau-Weilburg (1735-1788)
26. Frederick William, 4th Prince of Nassau-Weilburg (1768-1816)
27. William, Duke of Nassau (1792-1839)
28. Prince Nikolaus Wilhelm of Nassau (1832-1905)
29. Count George of Merenberg (1871-1948)
30. Count George of Merenberg (1897–1965)
31. Countess Clotilde of Merenberg (born 1941)
