= Countess Sophie of Merenberg =

German noble (1868–1927)

Sophie of Merenberg
- Countess de Torby
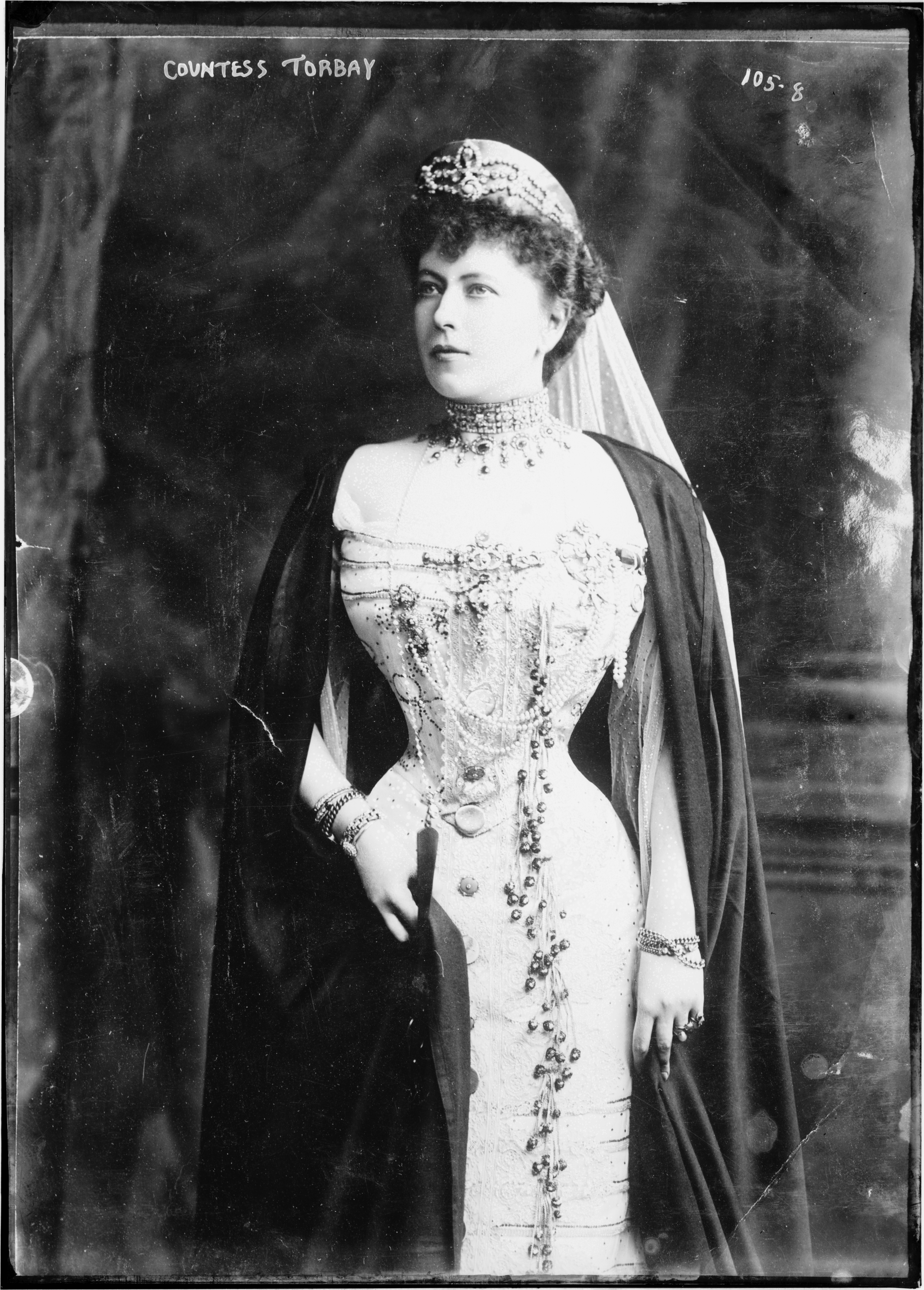
- Born: 1 June 1868; Geneva, Switzerland
- Died: 13 September 1927 (aged 59); London, England
- Buried: Hampstead Cemetery
- Noble family: Merenberg
- Spouse: Grand Duke Michael Mikhailovich of Russia (m. 1891)
- Issue: Anastasia de Torby; Nadejda de Torby; Michael de Torby
- Father: Prince Nikolaus Wilhelm of Nassau
- Mother: Natalia Alexandrovna Pushkina

Countess Sophie Nikolaievna of Merenberg, Countess de Torby (1 June 1868 – 14 September 1927), was the elder daughter of Prince Nikolaus Wilhelm of Nassau and his morganatic Russian wife, Natalia Alexandrovna Pushkina (who had been granted the title of Countess of Merenberg).

== Early life ==
She was born at Geneva, Switzerland, the first child of Prince Nikolaus Wilhelm of Nassau-Weilburg and Russian noblewoman Natalia Alexandrovna Pushkina. As the marriage of her parents was considered morganatic, she was ineligible to bear her father's title or rank. Her paternal grandparents were William, Duke of Nassau and Princess Pauline of Württemberg. Her maternal grandparents were Alexander Pushkin, the renowned Russian poet, and his wife, Natalia Goncharova.

Her brother, Count Georg Nikolaus von Merenberg (Wiesbaden, 13 February 1871 – Wiesbaden, 31 May 1948); married firstly on 12 May 1895 in Nice, Princess Olga Alexandrovna Yurievskaya (St. Petersburg, 8 November 1873 – Wiesbaden, 10 August 1925), daughter of Alexander II of Russia and his morganatic second wife, Princess Ekaterina Mikhailovna Dolgorukova. Sophie would go on to marry the Tsar's cousin, Grand Duke Michael Mikhailovich of Russia.

== Marriage and children ==
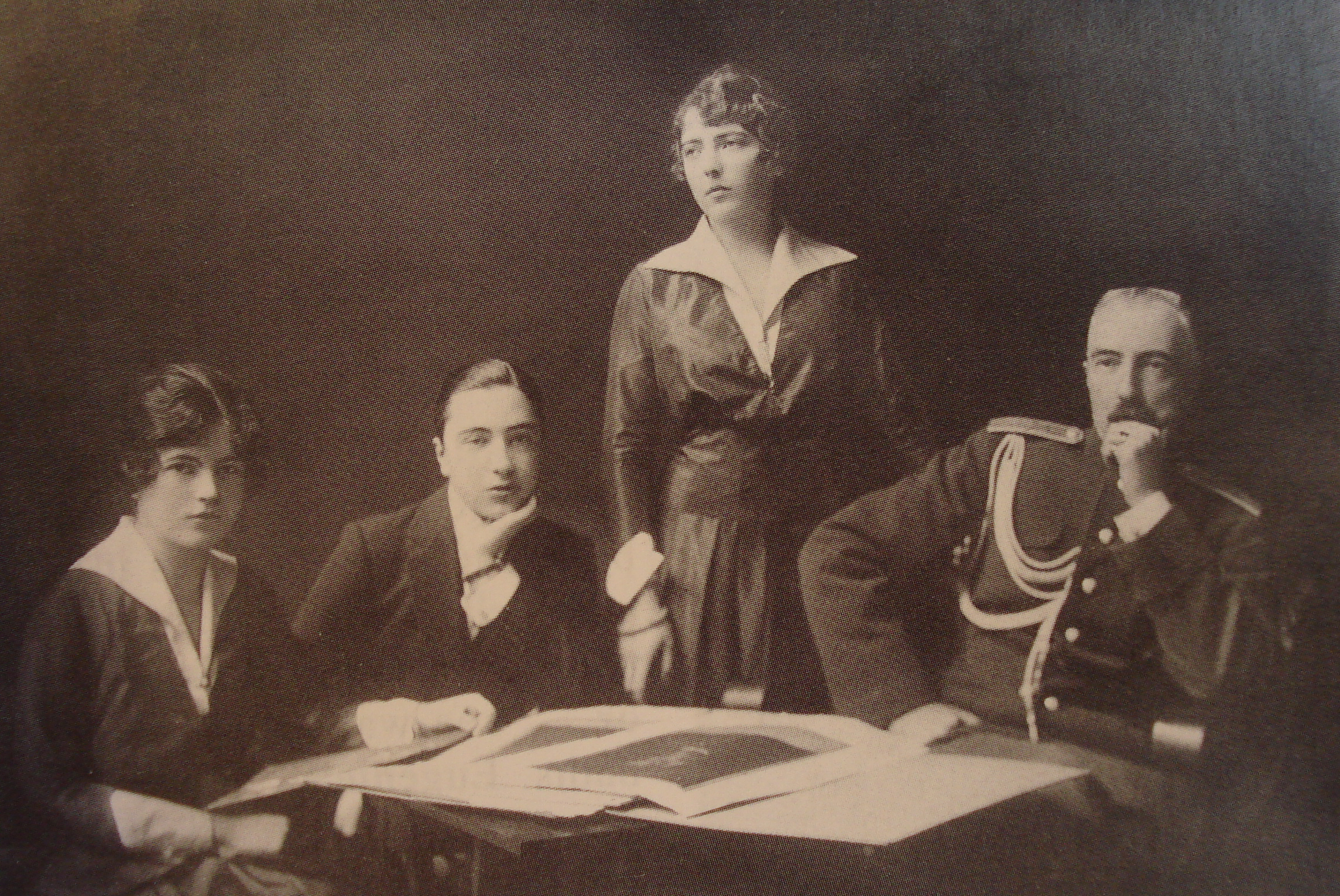
Grand Duke Michael Mikailovich of Russia (right) with his children (from left to right) Nadejda, Michael and Anastasia de Torby

She married morganatically (for him), on 26 February 1891, Grand Duke Michael Mikhailovich of Russia, grandson of Nicholas I of Russia, in secret at Sanremo, Italy. Michael and Sophie were related, as her father Prince Nikolaus was Grand Duke's third cousin. They had met in Nice and instantly fell in love. When his mother heard of the secret marriage to a bride of unequal status, she collapsed and fell ill, then subsequently died of a heart attack in Kharkov. He was blamed for her death and was forbidden to attend the funeral. Grand Duke Michael was denied his military rank and was sent into exile.

Sophia was created Countess de Torby in 1891 by her uncle, Adolphe, Grand Duke of Luxembourg. The title was extended to all three of her children.

They had two daughters and one son:

- Countess Anastasia Mikhailovna de Torby, known as "Zia" (9 September 1892 – 7 December 1977); married, in 1917, Major Harold Wernher (later Major-General Sir Harold Wernher, 3rd Baronet).
- Countess Nadejda Mikhailovna de Torby, known as "Nada" (28 March 1896 – January 1963); married, in 1916, Prince George of Battenberg (later the 2nd Marquess of Milford Haven).
- Count Michael Mikhailovich de Torby (8 October 1898 – 8 May 1959); an artist, who was not married.
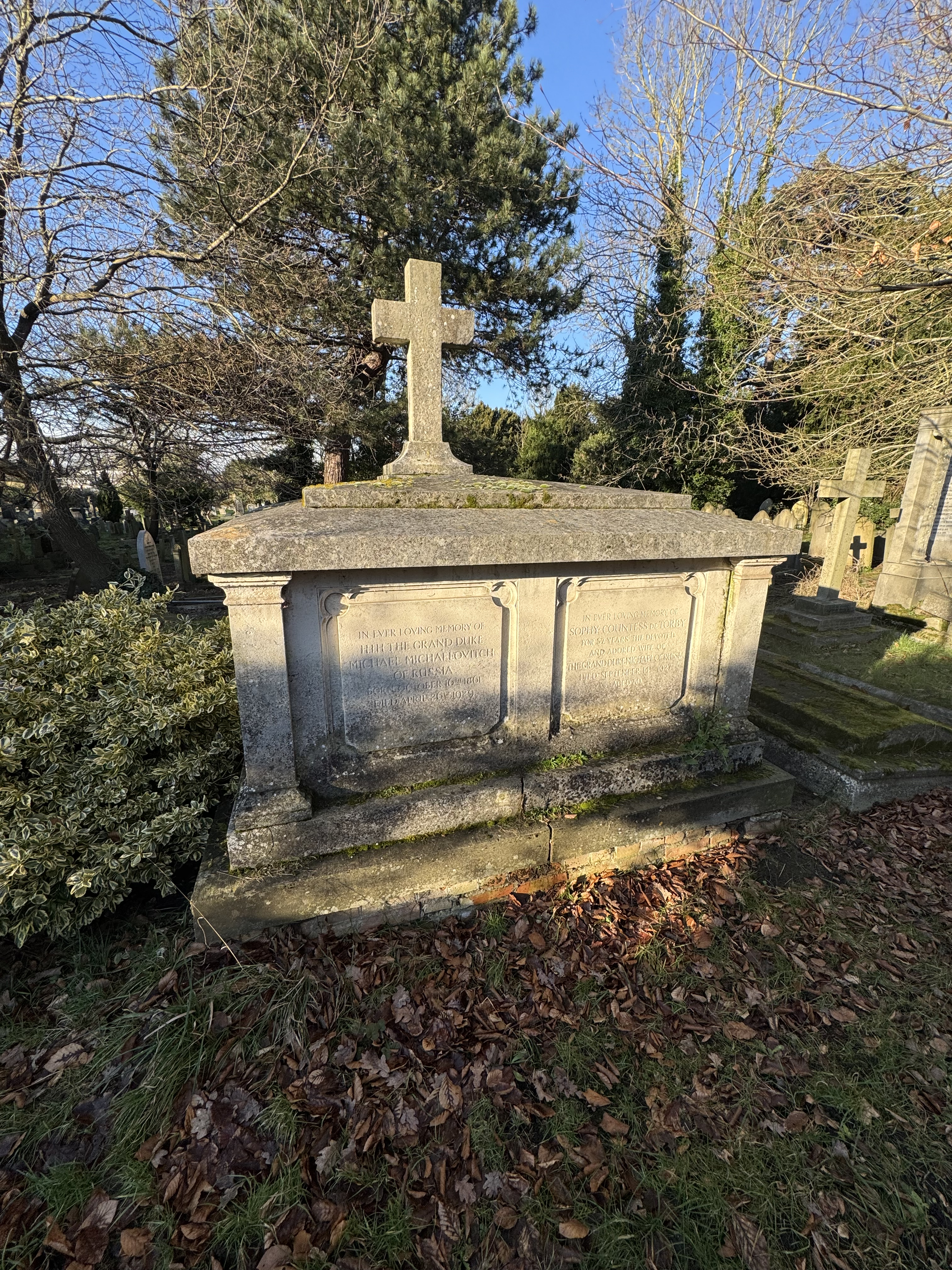
  Countess Sophie and her husband's grave at Hampstead Cemetery (2025).

== Later life and death ==
She and her husband lived at Kenwood House in Hampstead, London, prior to World War I. However, the Russian Revolution reduced the Grand Duke's finances. Despite their reduced circumstances, they were friends of King George V and Queen Mary, and they continued to attend society events.

Sophie died in London on 13 September 1927, aged 59, and was buried at Hampstead Cemetery. Grand Duke Michael contracted influenza and died in London on 26 April 1929, aged 67. He was buried alongside his wife.

== Ancestry ==
Ancestors of Countess Sophie of Merenberg

8. Frederick William, Prince of Nassau-Weilburg
4. William, Duke of Nassau
9. Burgravine Louise Isabelle of Kirchberg
2. Prince Nikolaus Wilhelm of Nassau
10. Prince Paul of Württemberg
5. Princess Pauline of Württemberg
11. Princess Charlotte of Saxe-Hildburghausen
1. Countess Sophie of Merenberg
12. Sergei Lvovich Pushkin
6. Alexander Sergeyevich Pushkin
13. Nadezhda Ossipovna Hannibal
3. Natalia Alexandrovna Pushkina
14. Nikolay Afanasievich Goncharov
7. Natalia Nikolayevna Goncharova
15. Natalia Ivanovna Zagriajskaya

== See also ==
- Count of Merenberg
