= Nadejda Mountbatten, Marchioness of Milford Haven =

Member of the Russian imperial family (1896–1963)

The Most Honourable The Marchioness of Milford Haven
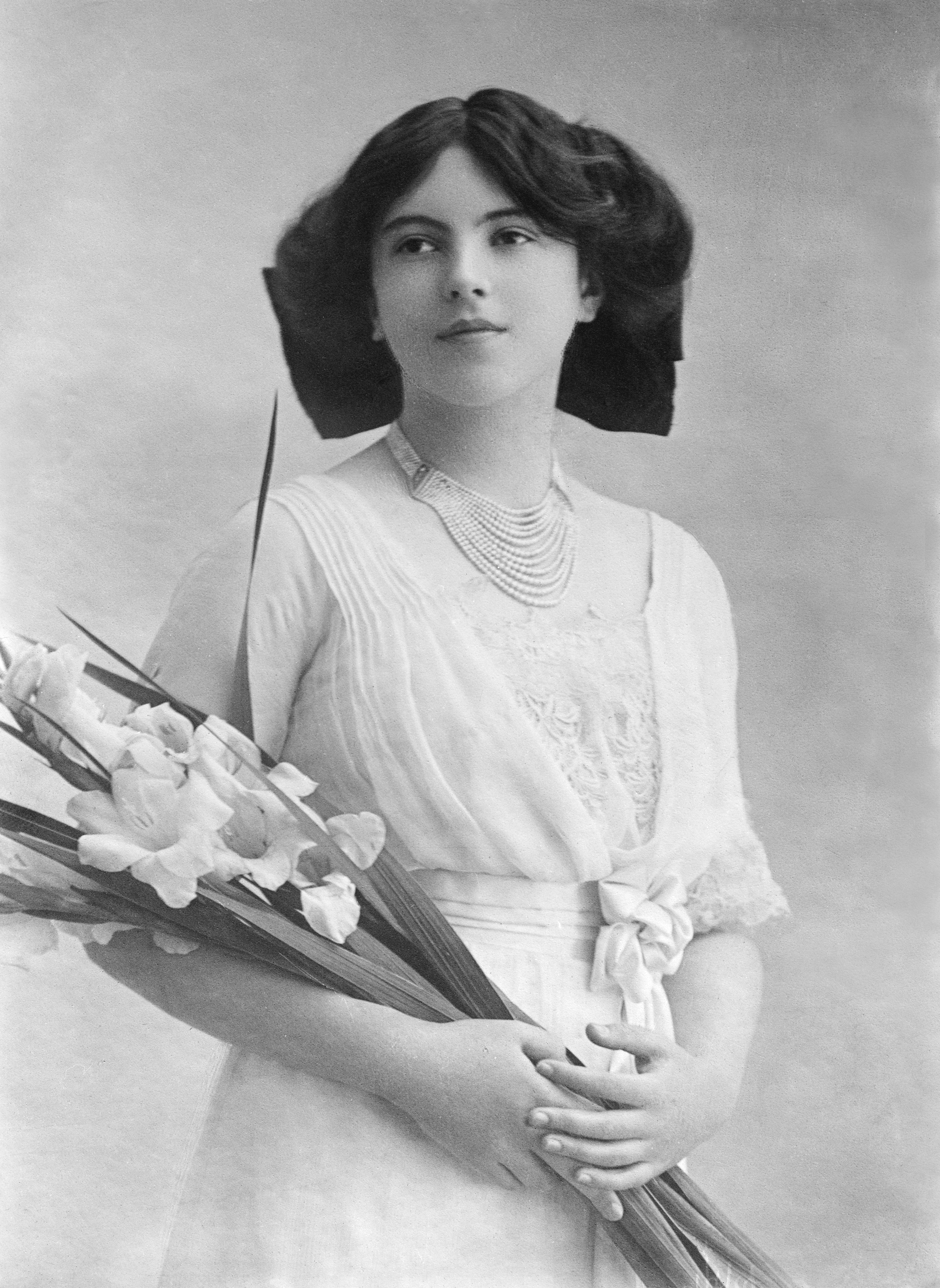
- Nadejda c. 1914
- Born: 28 March 1896; Cannes, France
- Died: 22 January 1963 (aged 66); Cannes, France
- Buried: 26 January 1963; Bray, Berkshire, England
- Noble family: Holstein-Gottorp-Romanov-Torby
- Spouse: George Mountbatten, 2nd Marquess of Milford Haven (m. 1916; died 1938)
- Issue: Lady Tatiana Mountbatten; David Mountbatten, 3rd Marquess of Milford Haven
- Father: Grand Duke Michael Mikhailovich of Russia
- Mother: Countess Sophie of Merenberg

Nadejda Mikhailovna Mountbatten, Marchioness of Milford Haven (née Countess Nadejda Mikhailovna de Torby, until 1917 Princess George of Battenberg; 28 March 1896 – 22 January 1963), was a member of the Russian imperial family who married a German prince but became a British subject and aristocrat. She was distantly related to the British royal family through her husband. She was born and had died in Cannes, on the French Riviera.

== Life ==
Countess Nadejda de Torby was the second daughter of Grand Duke Michael Mikhailovich of Russia and his morganatic wife Countess Sophie of Merenberg. She was a younger sister of Countess Anastasia de Torby.

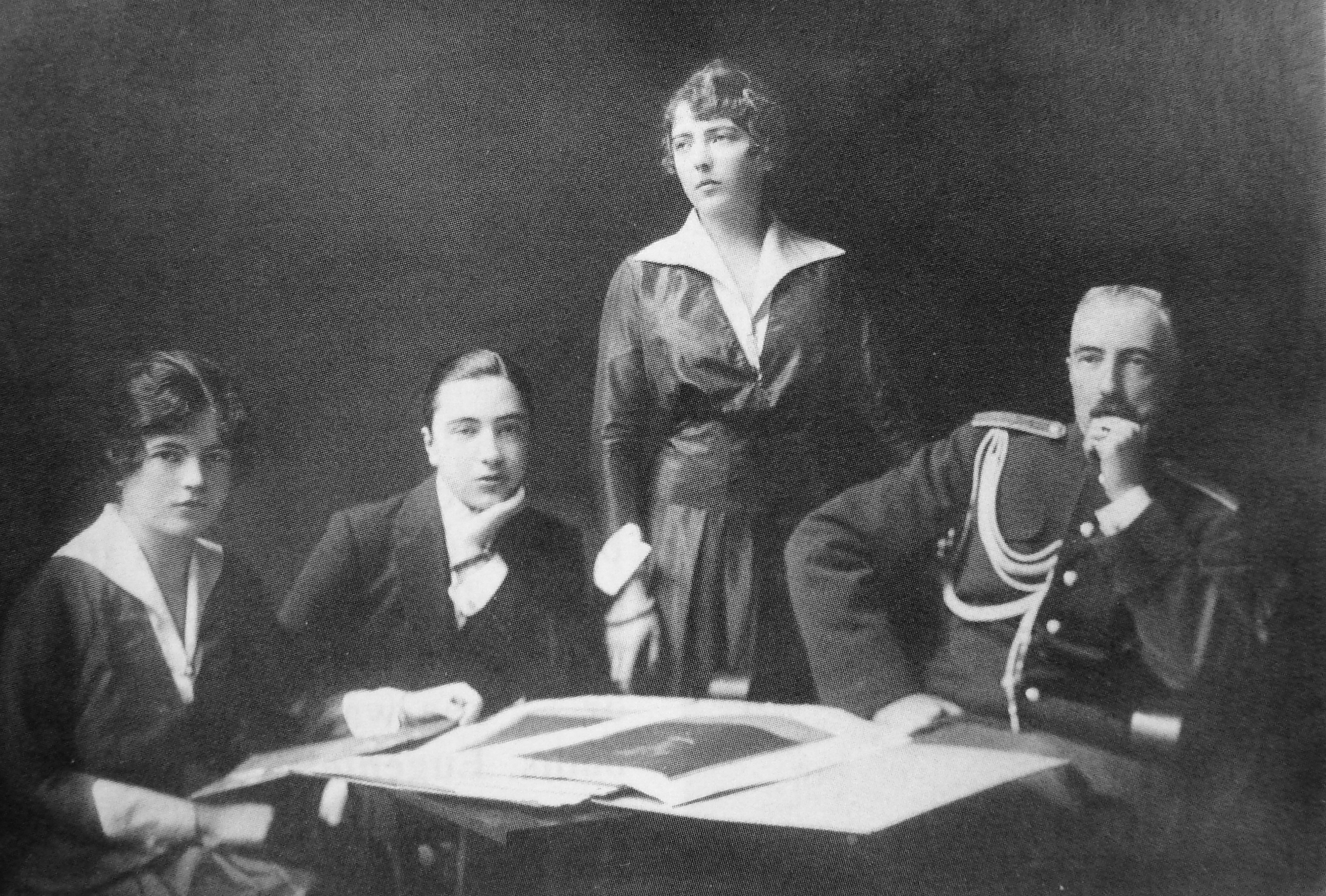
From left to right: Nadja Michailovna, Michael Mikhailovich, Anastasia Michailovna and their father Michael Mikhailovich of Russia

Her paternal grandparents were Grand Duke Michael Nicolaievich of Russia and Princess Cecily of Baden. Michael was the seventh and last child of Nicholas I of Russia and Charlotte of Prussia. Her mother was the daughter of Prince Nikolaus Wilhelm of Nassau and his morganatic wife Natalia Pushkina, Countess of Merenberg, daughter of Aleksander Pushkin, who in turn was a great-grandson of Peter the Great's African protégé, Abram Petrovich Gannibal.

Nicknamed "Nada", she attended the 1914 Kenwood House ball given jointly with her sister to mark her coming-out at 18 years of age.

She married Prince George of Battenberg, later the 2nd Marquess of Milford Haven, in London, England, on 15 November 1916. They had two children: Lady Tatiana Elizabeth Mountbatten (16 December 1917 – 15 May 1988), who died unmarried, and David Michael Mountbatten, 3rd Marquess of Milford Haven (12 May 1919 – 14 April 1970), father of the present Marquess.

During the 1934 Gloria Vanderbilt custody trial, a former maid of Gloria Morgan Vanderbilt's offered testimony regarding a possible lesbian relationship between Lady Milford Haven and the maid’s former employer, Gloria Morgan Vanderbilt. Lady Milford Haven also appeared as a witness at the trial. Before leaving for the United States to testify, Lady Milford Haven publicly denounced the maid's testimony as "a set of malicious, terrible lies". However, in June 2022 her grandson Lord Ivar Mountbatten stated in an interview with the Tatler "my aunt [sic] Nada was a lesbian." Gloria Vanderbilt later confirmed that there had been a romantic relationship between her mother and Lady Milford Haven. So far there is no personal account of Nadejda, that is publicly published, that indicates that she was a lesbian.

Nada and her sister-in-law, Edwina Mountbatten (wife of Lord Mountbatten), were extremely close friends and the two frequently went together on rather daring adventures, travelling rough in difficult and often dangerous parts of the world.

Lady Milford Haven died in Cannes, France, in 1963.

== Ancestry ==
Ancestors of Nadejda Mountbatten, Marchioness of Milford Haven

8. Nicholas I of Russia
4. Grand Duke Michael Nikolaevich of Russia
9. Princess Charlotte of Prussia
2. Grand Duke Michael Mikhailovich of Russia
10. Leopold, Grand Duke of Baden
5. Princess Cecilie of Baden
11. Princess Sophie of Sweden
1. Countess Nadejda Mikhailovna de Torby
12. William, Duke of Nassau
6. Prince Nikolaus Wilhelm of Nassau
13. Princess Pauline of Württemberg
3. Countess Sophie of Merenberg
14. Alexander Sergeyevich Pushkin
7. Natalia Alexandrovna Pushkina
15. Natalia Nikolayevna Goncharova

== See also ==
- Morganatic branches of the Russian Imperial Family
