= Pommern (disambiguation) =

Pommern is the German language name for Pomerania, a historical region divided between Germany and Poland.

Pommern may also refer to:

== Places ==
- Pommern, Rhineland-Palatinate, a municipality in the district of Cochem-Zell
- Mecklenburg-Vorpommern or Mecklenburg-Western Pomerania, a German state, partially covering Western Pomerania
- Swedish Pomerania, a Dominion under the Swedish Crown from 1630 to 1815, situated on what is now the Baltic coast of Germany and Poland

== Other uses ==
- Pommern (horse), a racehorse which won the English Triple Crown in 1915
- Several ships of the name; see List of ships named Pommern

== See also ==
- Pomeranian (disambiguation)
