= Enno von Rintelen =

German army officer of WWI and WWII

- Generalleutnant von Rintelen with Mussolini (right) in Civitavecchia on 1 February 1942
- Born: Enno Emil Rintelen; 6 November 1891; Stettin, Province of Pomerania, Kingdom of Prussia, German Empire
- Died: 7 August 1971 (aged 79); Heidelberg, Baden-Württemberg, West Germany
- Relatives: ∞ 1920 Ernina Bertha Lina Boy von Keßler; 2 children Countess Clotilde of Nassau-Merenberg (daughter-in-law)
- Military career
- Allegiance: Kingdom of Prussia; German Empire; Weimar Republic; Nazi Germany
- Branch: Prussian Army; Imperial German Army; Reichsheer; German Army
- Service years: 1910–1944
- Rank: General der Infanterie
- Conflicts: World War I: Western Front; Eastern Front; World War II: Western Desert campaign
- Awards: Iron Cross; German Cross in Silver

Enno Emil Rintelen, as of 1913 von Rintelen (6 November 1891 – 7 August 1971), was a German general who served in the First and Second World Wars. During the latter, he was the German military attaché in Italy.

== Early life ==
Enno was born in Stettin on 6 November 1891, the son and third of six children of Prussian Army Generalleutnant Friedrich Wilhelm von Rintelen (1855–1938) and his wife Maria Antonia Hedwig Amalia, née Russell (1865–1953). Wilhelm Rintelen, then Generalmajor, was ennobled on 16 June 1913, and the family was allowed to add the nobiliary particle "von" to their surname. Enno was initially homeschooled, then attended the Schiller-Realgymnasium in Stettin, gymnasiums in Stargard and Stralsund, the lyzeum in Strassburg, and the gymnasium in Küstrin.

== First World War ==
Rintelen joined the Prussian Army on 17 September 1910 as a fahnenjunker in the Grenadier-Regiment „König Friedrich Wilhelm IV.“ (1. Pommersches) Nr. 2. He was promoted to unteroffizier on 27 January 1911, fähnrich on 23 May 1911, and leutnant on 27 January 1912, with seniority backdated to 30 January 1910. During the First World War he served on the Western and Eastern fronts. He was adjutant of the III. Battalion of the 2nd Reserve Infantry Regiment from 2 August to 24 September 1914, then ordnance officer on the staff of the 81. Reserve Infantry Brigade from 13 January to 22 August 1915. He was promoted to oberleutnant on 18 September 1915.

On 13 December 1915, he joined the staff of the 2nd Grenadier Regiment, becoming adjutant on 13 January 1916, and a company commander on 15 September 1917. From 7 December 1917 to 23 May 1918, he was on the staff of the 109th Infantry Division, except from 24 January to 4 March 1918, when he commanded the 227th Field Artillery Regiment in that division. On 24 May 1918 he was posted to the staff of the XI Corps. He joined the staff of the 78th Reserve Division on 14 July, and the 44th Landwehr Division For his services, he was promoted to hauptmann on 18 October 1918. He was awarded both classes of the Iron Cross.

== Between the wars ==
After the war, Rintelen was one of the officers who was retained in the Reichswehr. He married Ernina Boy-Kessler on 9 June 1920 in Stettin. The couple had a daughter and a son, Enno, who later married Countess Clotilde of Nassau-Merenberg. Rintelen was posted to the staff of Gruppenkommando 1 in Berlin on 1 October 1921. On 1 October 1922 he was transferred to the staff of the 6th Division in Münster, and then, on 1 October 1922, to that of Gruppenkommando 2 in Kassel. On 1 October 1925, he assumed command of the 16th Company of the 15th Infantry Regiment. On 1 October 1928, he returned to staff duties on the staff of the 2nd Cavalry Division.

Promotion was slow in the inter-war years, and he was not promoted to major until 1 April 1931 (with seniority backdated to 1 October 1929). Thereafter, promotion became faster, and he was promoted to Oberstleutnant on 1 December 1933, and assumed command of the 1st Battalion of Infantry Regiment Döberitz on 1 October 1934. He was promoted to Oberst on 1 October 1935, and entered the Wehrmachtsakademie.

== Second World War ==
On 1 October 1936, Rintelen was posted to Rome as the German military attaché in Italy. He would remain in this post for the rest of his military career, although he was promoted to generalmajor on 1 June 1939, generalleutnant on 1 June 1941, and general der infanterie on 1 July 1942. After Italy entered the Second World War in June 1940, he became the representative of the Oberkommando der Wehrmacht (OKW) to the Italian High Command (Comando Supremo). As such, he was answerable to the Oberkommando des Heeres, the OKW and the Foreign Office. He learned to speak Italian fluently, and established good relationships with the Italian civil and military leadership.

When German troops started moving into Italy (Operation Achse), Rintelen exercised command over them, although operational units came under Italian tactical command. He was given the title of Deutscher General bei dem Hauptquartier der italienischen Wehrmacht (German General at the Headquarters of the Italian Armed Forces). Generalfeldmarschall Albert Kesselring was appointed OB Süd in December 1941, but initially controlled only the air forces in Sicily. Rintelen was subordinated to him in October 1942, but could still communicate with the OKW directly as its representative in Italy.

Despite his warm relations with the Italians, Rintelen was under no illusions about the military prowess of Italy, which he felt was exaggerated by the Nazis due to their political affinity with fascism. In May 1943, he submitted a report on combat effectiveness of the Italian armed forces, concluding that they "have not up to now fulfilled the missions assigned them in this war, and have actually failed everywhere." He concluded that the Italians could not repel a full-scale Allied invasion of Italy without substantial German assistance. In response, OKW ordered Kesselring to reconstitute three divisions that had been destroyed in the Tunisian campaign.

When the Italian government changed in July 1943, Rintelen accepted the explanation of General Vittorio Ambrosio that it would have no effect on military operations and that Italy would remain in the war as an ally of Germany. Adolf Hitler did not believe it, and used Rintelen, whom he considered an "Italophile", as cover while OKW prepared Fall Achse (Operation Axis) to disarm the Italian forces and occupy Italy. When he found out about it, Rintelen considered it a breach of faith with the Italians, and urged Kesselring to resign rather than implement it. Rintelen went to see Hitler in person. Hitler was far from convinced, and suspected Rintelen was a traitor. Nonetheless, he let him return to his post in Italy as if nothing had happened.

On 1 September 1943, Rintelen was transferred to the Führerreserve and was succeeded by Rudolf Toussaint. On 31 December 1944, Rintelen retired, and was awarded the German Cross in Silver for his services. He had also been awarded the Italian Order of Saints Maurice and Lazarus.

== Later life ==
Rintelen worked for the US Army's Historical Division in 1946 and 1947, writing a monograph on German-Italian Cooperation. He also wrote about his experiences in Italy in a book Mussolini als Bundesgenosse: Erinnerungen des deutschen Militärattachés in Rom, 1936–1943 ("Mussolini as ally: Memoires of the German military attaché in Rome, 1936-1943") (1951). It was translated into Italian but never published in English.

== Awards and decorations ==
- Iron Cross (1914), 2nd and 1st Class
  - 2nd Class on 19 September 1914
  - 1st Class on 28 June 1916
- Honour Cross of the World War 1914/1918 with Swords on 30 December 1934
- Wehrmacht Long Service Award, 4th to 1st Class (25-year Service Cross) on 2 October 1936
- War Merit Cross (1939), 2nd and 1st Class with Swords
  - 2nd Class on 6 November 1940
  - 1st Class on 1 September 1941
- Repetition Clasp 1939 to the Iron Cross 1914, 2nd and 1st Class on 6 February 1942
- Wound Badge (1939) in Black on 19 December 1942
- Africa Cuff Band in 1943
- German Cross in Silver on 31 December 1944

=== Foreign awards ===
- Hungarian World War Commemorative Medal with Swords in 1938
- Order of Saints Maurice and Lazarus, Commander's Cross
- Military Order of Savoy, Commander's Cross
- Colonial Order of the Star of Italy, 2nd Class (Grand Officer) with Breast Star
- Order of Skanderbeg (1925–1945), Grand Officer with Breast Star
- Order of Merit of the Kingdom of Hungary, Grand Cross
- Order of the Crown of Italy, Grand Cross
- Cross of Military Merit (Spain), 4th Class (Grand Cross) with White Decoration

== Sources ==
- German Federal Archives: BArch PERS 6/300470

== Bibliography ==
- von Rintelen, Enno Emil (1951). Mussolini als Bundesgenosse: Erinnerungen des deutschen Militärattachés in Rom, 1936–1943 (in German). Tübingen: Wunderlich. OCLC 891288510.
- von Rintelen, Enno Emil (1952). Mussolini l'alleato : ricordi dell'addetto militare tedesco a Roma : (1936-1943). Documenti della seconda guerra mondiale, 7. Rome: Corso. OCLC 801125077.
