= Pomerania Province =

Pomerania Province may refer to one of several provinces established in Pomerania, a region of Europe:

- Swedish Pomerania (1630–1815), a historical province of Sweden
- Province of Pomerania (1653–1815), a historical province of Brandenburg, later Brandenburg-Prussia
- Province of Pomerania (1815–1945), a historical province of Prussia, later Germany

== See also ==
- Pomerania (disambiguation)
- Pomeranian Voivodeship, the name of several historical and one current province of Poland
- West Pomeranian Voivodeship
- Kuyavian–Pomeranian Voivodeship
