= List of ships named Pommern =

A number of ships have been named Pommern, the German name for Pomerania, including:

- Pommern (1893), a three-masted barque built as Saxon, and a German schoolship from 1928; she was wrecked on her first training voyage in 1930
- Pommern (ship) (1903), a four-masted barque built as Mneme, and now a museum at Mariehamn
- SMS Pommern, a German battleship, launched in 1905 and sunk in 1916
- SS Pommern (1906), a German icebreaker, in service at Stettin and Hamburg until 1951
- SS Pommern (1913), a Norddeuscher Lloyd cargo liner, seized in World War 1, becoming USS Rappahannock (AF-6)
- Pommern (1939), the refrigerated ship Belain d’Esnambuc seized from France by Germany and commissioned as a naval minelayer; she was sunk in 1943
