= Prince Nikolaus Wilhelm of Nassau =

Prince of Nassau

Prince Nikolaus Wilhelm
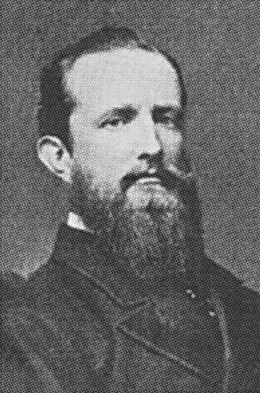
- Born: 20 September 1832; Biebrich
- Died: 17 September 1905 (aged 72); Wiesbaden
- Spouse: Natalia Alexandrovna Pushkina (m. 1868)
- Issue Detail: Sophie, Countess of Torby; Countess Alexandrine of Merenberg; Count Georg Nikolaus of Merenberg
- House: House of Nassau-Weilburg
- Father: William, Duke of Nassau
- Mother: Princess Pauline of Württemberg
- Religion: Calvinism

Prince Nikolaus Wilhelm of Nassau (20 September 1832 – 17 September 1905) was a German prince, military officer and parliamentarian. He was the youngest son of William, Duke of Nassau, and the only son by his second wife Princess Pauline of Württemberg.

The scion of a minor German princely family, Prince Nikolaus initially pursued a military career which notably led him to fight France during the Italian War of 1859. In 1862, he was briefly considered a candidate for the vacant Greek throne by the British government. Following the annexation of the Duchy of Nassau by the Kingdom of Prussia as a consequence of the Austro-Prussian War in 1866, he entered into Prussian military service the following year. As such, he participated in the military campaign in France during the Franco-Prussian War of 1870-71.

In 1868, he entered into a morganatic marriage with the youngest child of the Russian poet Alexander Pushkin, Natalia Alexandrovna Pushkina, who was created Countess of Merenberg. The subsequent claims of inheritance and succession in the Grand Duchy of Luxembourg of the children born of this marriage later developed into the socalled Merenberg Affair. His granddaughter, Countess Nadejda Mikhailovna de Torby married George Mountbatten, 2nd Marquess of Milford Haven in 1916.

== Early life ==
=== Birth and family ===
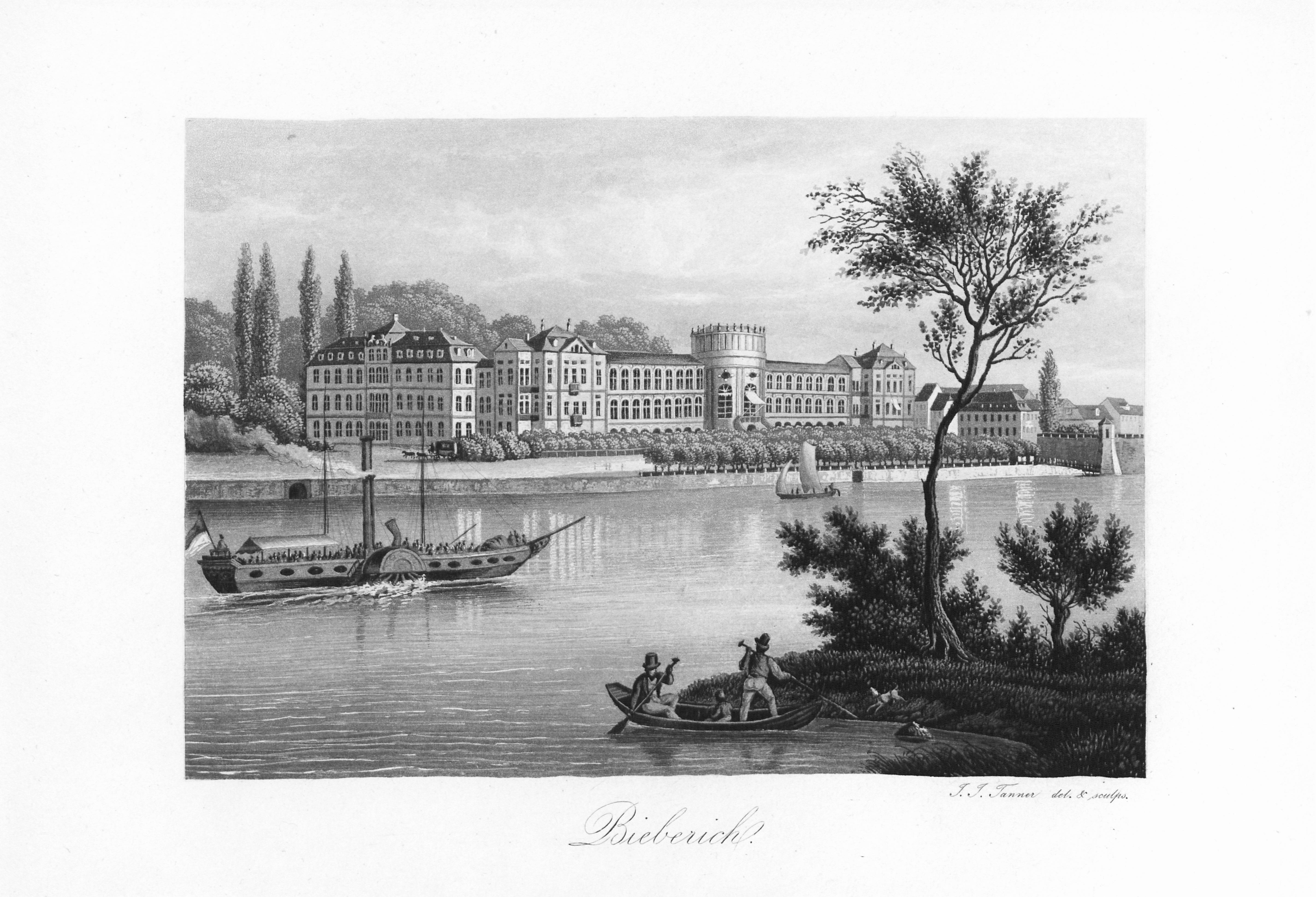
Biebrich Palace in 1840.

Nikolaus was born on 20 September 1832 at Biebrich Palace in the Duchy of Nassau. He was the eleventh child of William, Duke of Nassau (1792–1839), and the third by his second wife Princess Pauline of Württemberg (1810–1856), a daughter of Prince Paul of Württemberg. Nikolaus was the half-brother of Adolphe, Grand Duke of Luxembourg (then Hereditary Prince of Nassau), and was related to the Dutch royal family and also, distantly, to the British royal family through his father and mother, both of whom were descendants of King George II of Great Britain.

=== Childhood and youth ===
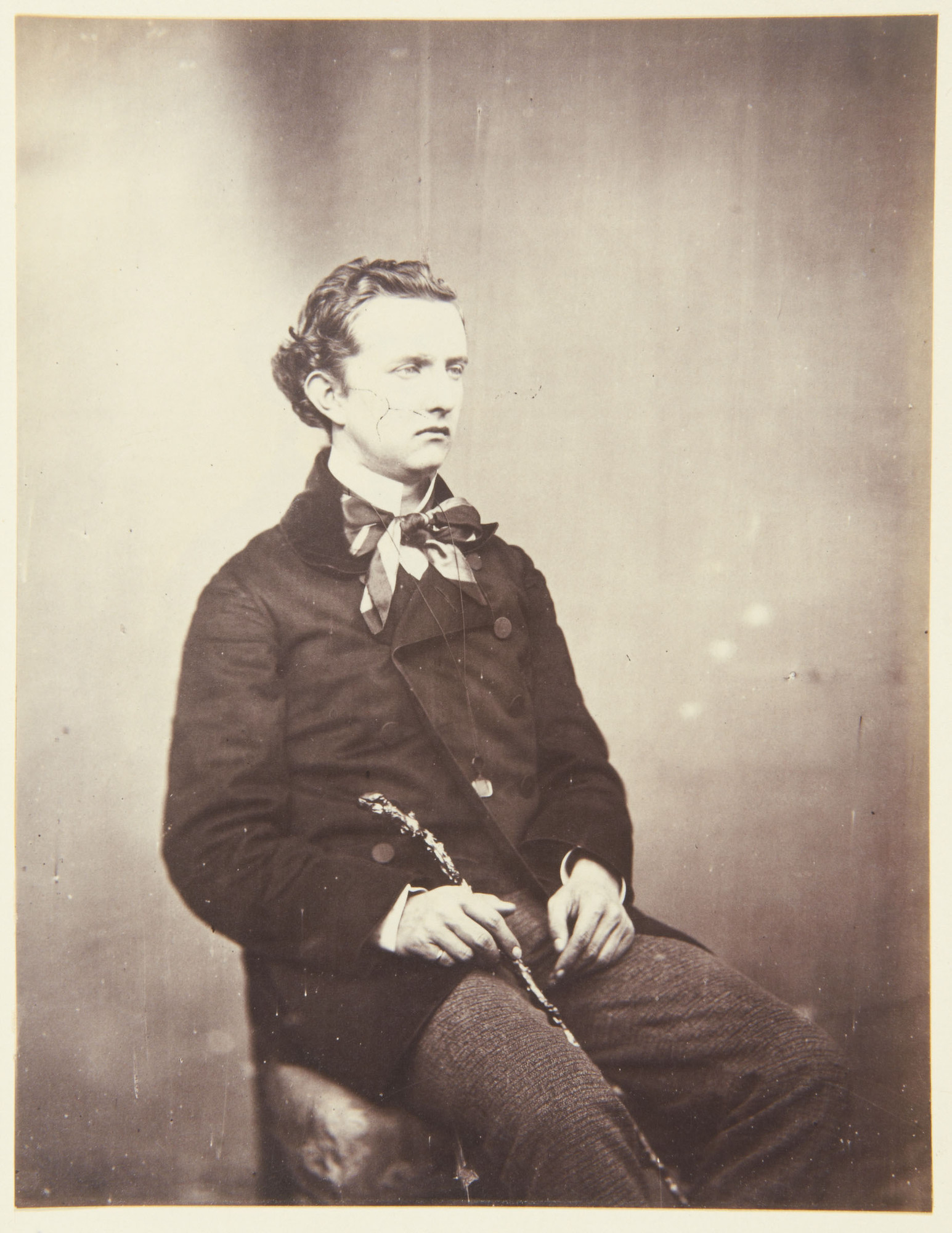
Prince Nikolaus in 1854.

Prince Nikolaus was raised with his siblings in the ducal household in Nassau, and grew up between his parents' residences, the City Palace in the duchy's capital of Wiesbaden and Biebrich Palace, located on the banks of the Rhine River in Biebrich south of the city. His father died in 1839 when he was six years old and was succeeded as the Duke of Nassau by his half-brother Adolf. In 1840, the young general staff officer Robert Roth was appointed his governor and thus supervisor of the prince's upbringing, a position which Roth held until 1849. After being educated at home in his childhood, he started a military career at the age of 12. On 25 February 1845, he joined the 2nd Infantry Regiment of the Ducal Army of Nassau as a second lieutenant and became a first lieutenant there on 24 July 1849. On 2 February 1850, he left the Nassau army and went into Austrian service as a lieutenant colonel in the 18th Jäger Battalion of the Imperial Austrian Army. He remained in Austrian service until June 1854 when he reentered the Army of Nassau as a captain à la suite in the Jäger Battalion and became a major à la suite on 1 July 1855. As such, he participated at the Austrian headquarters in the Italian War of 1859 against France and the Kingdom of Sardinia. In 1856, he became a member of the Council of State of the Duchy of Nassau.

=== Candidate for the Greek throne ===
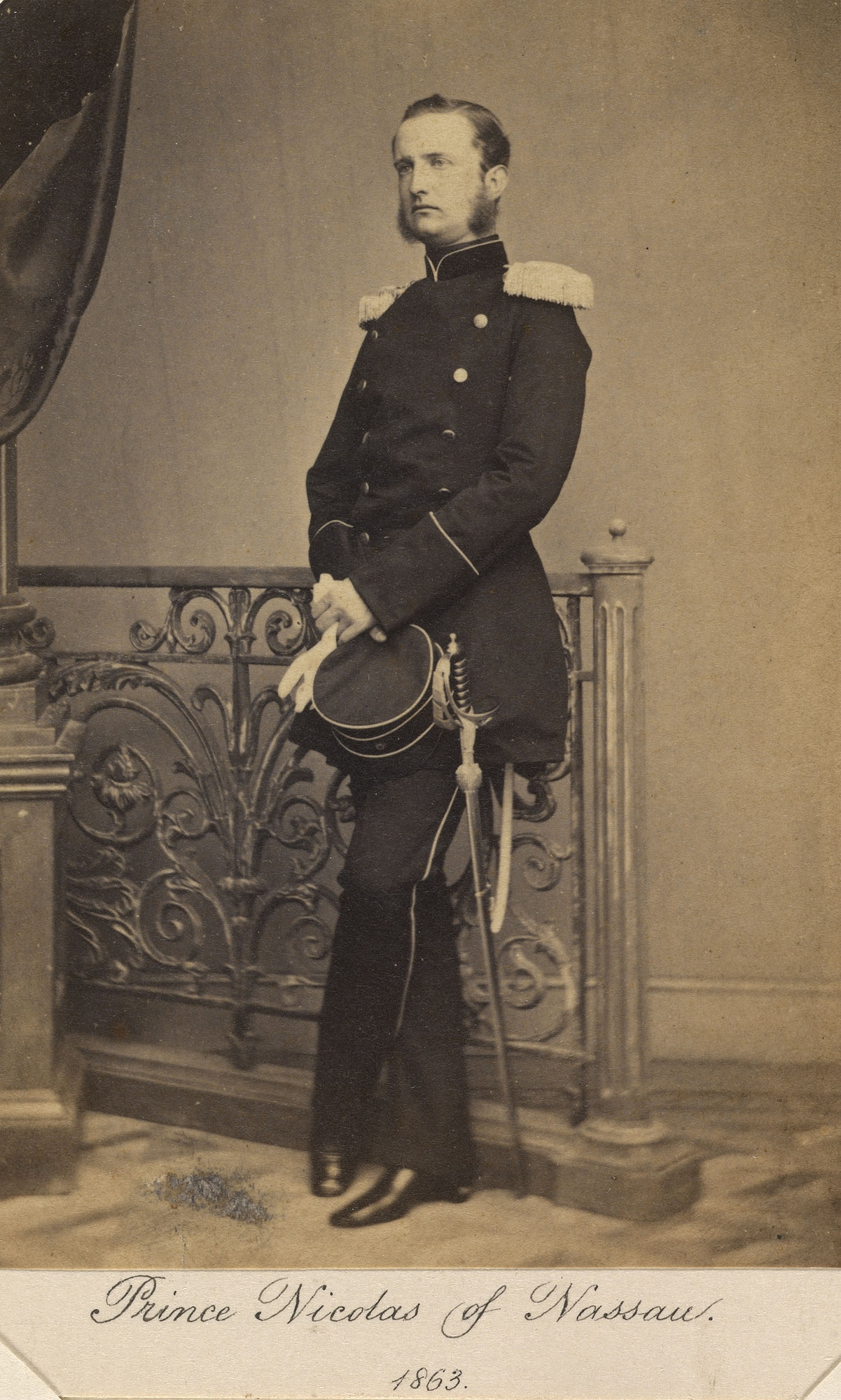
Prince Nikolaus in 1863.

Following the expulsion of Otto of Greece in October 1862, the government of the United Kingdom briefly considered making Prince Nikolaus its candidate for the vacant Greek throne. Nikolaus displayed liberal opinions and the then liberal British prime minister Lord Palmerston was convinced that he would make a good sovereign. However, the French Emperor Napoleon III rejected the candidacy of Nikolaus because he didn't want to see an officer who had recently fought against the French armies on the Greek throne. It was therefore ultimately the young Prince William of Denmark who would be elected monarch of the Kingdom of Greece in 1863.

=== Annexation of the Duchy of Nassau ===
Prince Nikolaus was promoted to colonel on 1 January 1864 and to general major à la suite on 1 February 1865. In 1866, the Duchy of Nassau was annexed by the Kingdom of Prussia as a consequence of siding with the Austrian Empire during the Austro-Prussian War. In this context, Prince Nikolaus conducted the negotiations in Berlin about the future of the Nassau Field Brigade, as well as the political position and assets of the Ducal House of Nassau. Prussia also paid a substantial compensation to Duke Adolf, Nikolaus' half-brother. In spite of the annexation, Prince Nikolaus entered into Prussian military service in March 1867 with the rank of general major à la suite in the Royal Prussian Army.

== Marriage ==
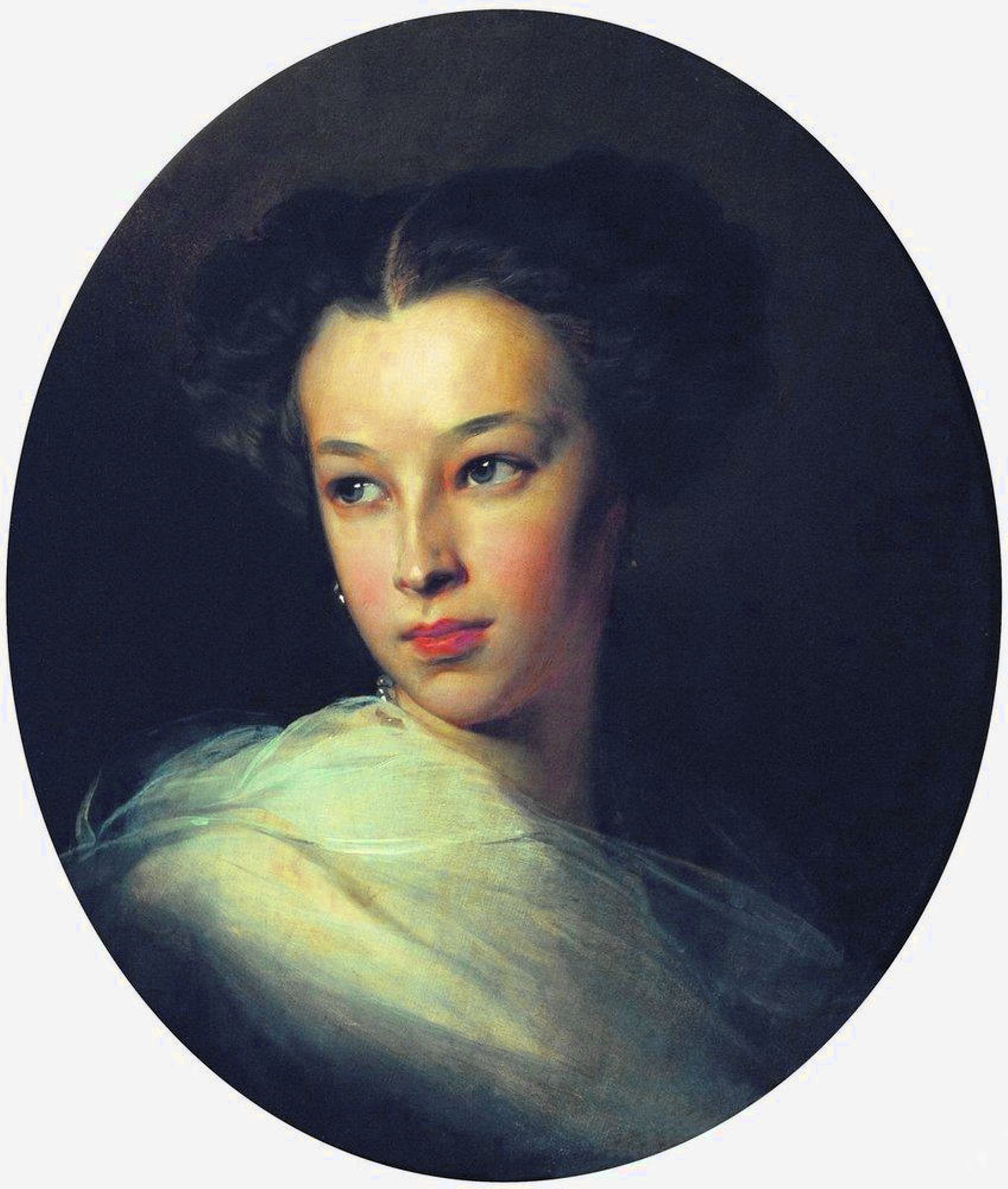
Natalia Alexandrovna Pushkina, known as one of the most charming women of her time. Portrait by Ivan Makarov, 1849.

In 1856, Prince Nikolaus Wilhelm represented the Duchy of Nassau at the coronation of Emperor Alexander II in Russia. There he met Natalia Alexandrovna Pushkina (Saint Petersburg, 4 June 1836 – Cannes, 23 March 1913) who was the youngest child of Alexander Sergeyevich Pushkin and his wife, Natalia Nikolayevna Goncharova. Through her father, Natalia descended from Peter the Great's African protégé, Abram Petrovich Gannibal, and through her mother, Natalia descended from the Cossack leader Voivode Petro Doroshenko, Hetman of Ukrainian Cossacks, in turn grandson of Mykhailo Doroshenko. At the time, she was married to Russian General Mikhail Leontievich von Dubelt, by whom she had a daughter. The marriage was unhappy, and Natalia tried to obtain a divorce from her husband starting in 1862.

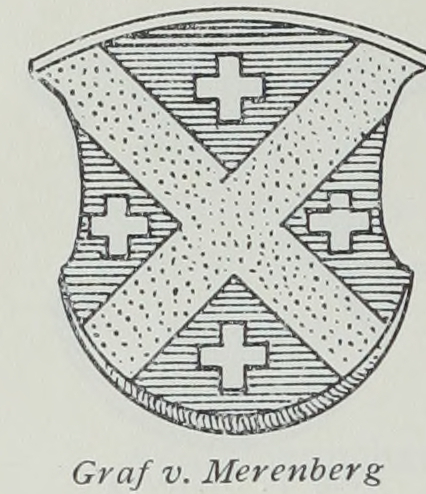
Arms of the Count of Merenberg, 1907

In December 1867, Prince Nikolaus informed his half-brother, Duke Adolph, about his marriage to Natalia which was to have taken place “some time ago”. In reality, Natalia was not yet divorced, but was pregnant. Her divorce was finalized on 18 May 1868, and on 1 June 1868 Natalia gave birth to a daughter, Sophie. A month later, on 1 July 1868, Prince Nikolaus Wilhelm concluded a morganatic marriage in London with Natalia. As by family law, members of the House of Nassau could only marry into the reigning or former reigning families of Europe, and Natalia's father ranked only as a dvoryanin, an untitled member of the landed nobility, she was not legally permitted to share her husband's princely title or rank, even though his family had ceased to be hereditary rulers when the kingdom of Prussia annexed Nassau. Therefore, on 29 June 1868, Prince Nikolaus Wilhelm's sister Princess Helena of Nassau's husband George Victor, Prince of Waldeck and Pyrmont granted Natalia and her male-line descendants the title of Count or Countess of Merenberg. The name refers to the community of Merenberg in what is now the state of Hesse, Germany.

The couple had two further children who also received the title of Count(ess) of Merenberg: Countess Alexandrine (born in 1869) and Count Georg (born in 1871). The later claims of inheritance and succession in the Grand Duchy of Luxembourg developed into the socalled Merenberg Affair.

== Later life ==
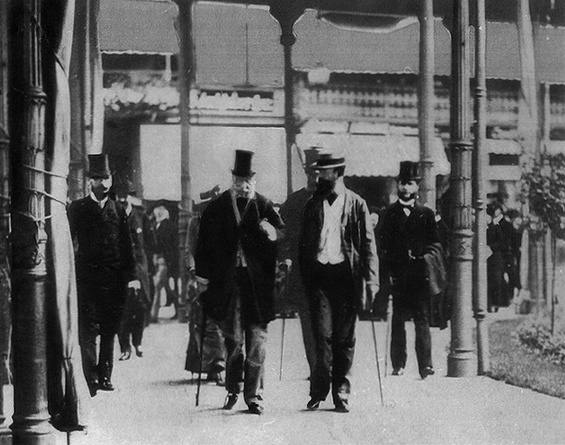
Prince Nikolaus with King William I of Prussia during a visit to Bad Ems, c. 1870.

From 1869 until his death, the couple lived in a stately villa in Wiesbaden.

In 1870-71, Prince Nikolaus participated in the military campaign in France during the Franco-Prussian War. He served in the Guards Corps and took part in the battles of Gravelotte, Sedan and Le Bourget as well as the Siege of Paris. He received the Iron Cross, 2nd class for Sedan and the Iron Cross, 1st class for Paris.

In the further course of his military career, the Prussian King awarded him the rank of lieutenant general on 11 June 1879 and the rank of general of the infantry on 10 September 1897.

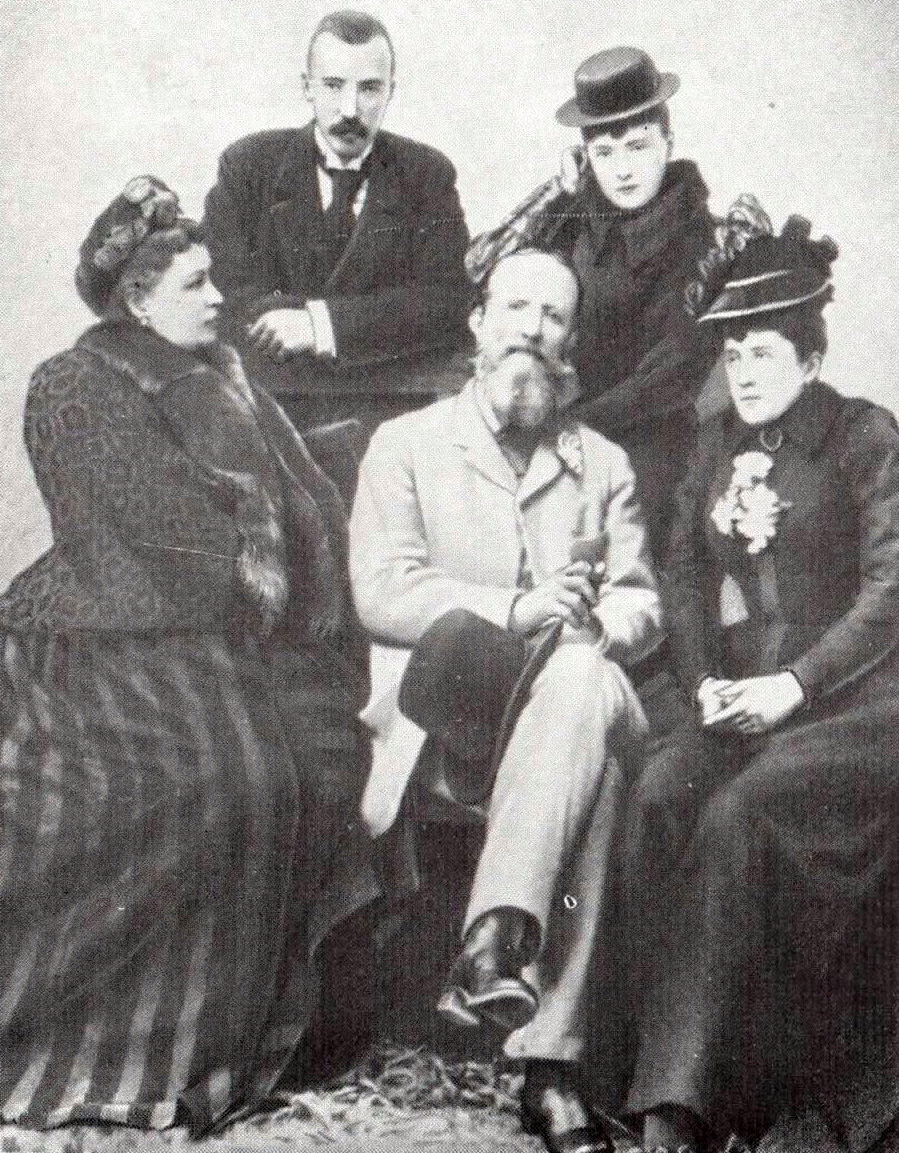
Prince Nikolaus with his wife, daughters and son-in-law in 1895.

In 1890, Prince Nikolaus' half brother, Duke Adolf inherited the throne of the Grand Duchy of Luxembourg upon the male-line extinction of the Dutch line of the House of Nassau.

In 1891, Prince Nikolaus daughter, Countess Sophie of Merenberg, married Grand Duke Michael Mihailovich of Russia (1861-1929) who was a son of Grand Duke Michael Nicolaievich of Russia and a grandson of Tsar Nicholas I of Russia. As this marriage was also deemed morganatic, she was not allowed to share her husband's titles and rank. Instead, she was created Countess de Torby by Prince Nikolaus' brother, the Grand Duke of Luxembourg. And in 1895, Prince Nikolaus' son, Count Georg of Merenberg, married Princess Olga Alexandrovna Yurievskaya (1874-1925), the morganatic daughter of Emperor Alexander II of Russia.

== Death and aftermath ==
=== Death and burial ===
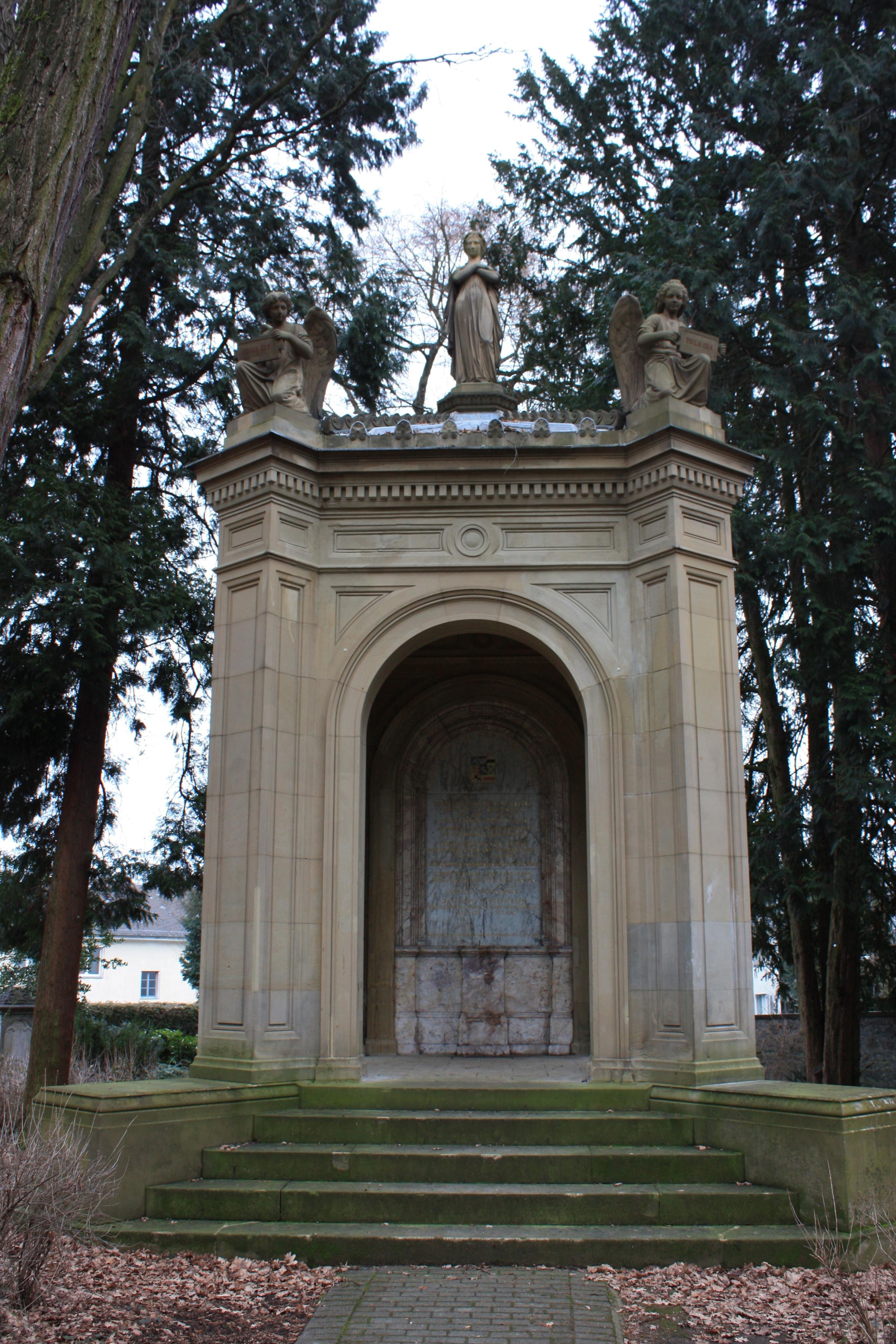
The mausoleum for Duchess Pauline of Nassau, her son Prince Nikolaus Wilhelm and his wife the Countess of Merenberg in the Old Cemetery in Wiesbaden.

Prince Nikolaus Wilhelm died aged 72 on 17 September 1905 in Wiesbaden. His wife survived him by seven years and died aged 76 on 23 March 1913 in Cannes. He is buried with his mother and wife in the mausoleum for Duchess Pauline of Nassau in the Old Cemetery in Wiesbaden.

=== The Merenberg Affair ===
Prince Nikolaus' death was closely followed by the death of his brother, Grand Duke Adolphe on 17 November 1905. The son of Grand Duke Adolphe ascended the throne under the name of William IV of Luxembourg but he only had daughters, and Luxembourg was governed by the Salic Law which excluded daughters from the succession. The only heir in the male line of the Grand Duke was his cousin, Prince Nikolaus' son Count Georg of Merenberg. But the young man was born from a morganatic marriage, and William IV preferred to declare him a non-dynast and repeal the Salic law. Eventually, his daughter Marie-Adélaïde would succeed him as Grand Duchess in 1912.

== Honours and awards ==
- Württemberg: Grand Cross of the Württemberg Crown, 1849
- Nassau:
  - Knight of the Gold Lion of Nassau, May 1858
  - Grand Cross of the Order of Adolphe of Nassau, with Swords, May 1858
- Grand Duchy of Hesse: Grand Cross of the Ludwig Order, 26 December 1858
- Austrian Empire: Grand Cross of the Imperial Order of Leopold, 1859
- Russian Empire: Knight of St. Andrew, 1864
- Kingdom of Prussia:
  - Grand Cross of the Red Eagle, 6 February 1867
  - Iron Cross (1870), 2nd Class on Black Band
  - Red Cross Medal, 1st Class, 27 January 1899
- Sweden-Norway: Knight of the Seraphim, 9 July 1881
- Brunswick: Grand Cross of the Order of Henry the Lion
- (Saxe-Coburg and Gotha) (Duchy of Saxe-Altenburg) (Saxe-Meiningen) Ernestine duchies: Grand Cross of the Saxe-Ernestine House Order
- Principality of Lippe: Cross of Honour of the House Order of Lippe, 1st Class with Swords
- Netherlands: Grand Cross of the Netherlands Lion

== Issue ==
- Countess Sophie von Merenberg (Geneva, 1 June 1868 – London, 14 September 1927); created Countess de Torby in 1891; married in Sanremo on 26 February 1891, Grand Duke Michael Mikhailovich of Russia (Peterhof Palace, Peterhof, 16 October 1861 – London, 26 April 1929) and had issue.
- Countess Alexandrine von Merenberg (Wiesbaden, 14 December 1869 – Buenos Aires, 29 September 1950); married in London in 1914 Argentine Don Maximo de Elia (1851 – Saint-Jean-de-Luz, 1929), no issue.
- Count Georg Nikolaus von Merenberg (Wiesbaden, 13 February 1871 – Wiesbaden, 31 May 1948) married Olga Alexandrovna Yurievskaya on 12 May 1895. They have three children. He remarried Adelheid Moran-Brambeer on 2 January 1930.
  - Count Alexander Adolf Nikolaus von Merenberg (Hannover, 16 September 1896 – Hannover, 20 December 1897).
  - Count Georg Michael Alexander von Merenberg (Hannover, 16 October 1897 – Mainz, 11 January 1965); married firstly in Budapest on 7 January 1926, Paulette Kövér de Gyergyó-Szent-Miklós, divorced in 1928, no issue; married secondly in Schroda on 27 July 1940, Elisabeth Anne Müller Uri (Wiesbaden, 1 July 1903 – Wiesbaden, 18 November 1963), and had issue:
    - Countess Elisabeth Clothilde von Merenberg (b. Wiesbaden, 14 May 1941); married in Wiesbaden on 25 May 1965 Enno von Rintelen (b. Berlin, 9 November 1921 - 16 October 2013), and had issue:
      - Alexander Enno von Rintelen (b. Wiesbaden, 23 March 1966).
      - Georg Nikolaus von Rintelen (b. Wiesbaden, 29 June 1970); married on 30 May 2007 Olivia Minninger (b. Köln, 27 August 1969), and had issue:
        - Julian von Rintelen (b. 7 January 2003)
        - Nicolai von Rintelen (b. München, 17 November 2006)
      - Gregor von Rintelen (b. Wiesbaden, 13 August 1972); married in 2002 Countess Christiane von Bentheim-Tecklenburg-Rheda-Prill (b. Wiesbaden, 18 May 1973), and had issue:
        - Frederick von Rintelen (b. 11 December 2006)
        - Luise von Rintelen (b. 30 June 2009)
  - Countess Olga Katharina Adda von Merenberg (Wiesbaden, 3 October 1898 – Bottmingen bei Basel, 15 September 1983); married in Wiesbaden on 14 November 1923 Count Michael Loris-Melikov (Tsarskoye Selo, 16 June 1900 – Bottmingen, 2 October 1980), and had issue:
    - Count Alexander Loris-Melikov (b. Paris, 26 May 1926); married in Soignies on 27 September 1958 Micheline Prunier (b. Liège, 21 June 1932), and had issue:
      - Countess Ann Elisabeth Loris-Melikova (b. Basel, 23 July 1959); married in Therwil on 4 November 1983 Marc Moos (b. 5 February 1953), and had issue:
        - Alain Moos (b. Basel, 26 March 1984).
      - Countess Dominique Loris-Melikova (b. Basel, 24 March 1961).
      - Countess Nathalie Loris-Melikova (b. Basel, 28 December 1963); married in Küssnacht on 9 October 1996 Johan Dierbach (b. Stockholm, 12 January 1963), and had issue:
        - Sophie Dierbach (b. Zürich, 23 February 1997).
      - Count Michael Loris-Melikov (b. Basel, 18 December 1964); unmarried with no issue.

== Ancestry ==
Ancestors of Prince Nikolaus Wilhelm of Nassau

8. Charles Christian, Prince of Nassau-Weilburg
4. Frederick William, Prince of Nassau-Weilburg
9. Princess Carolina of Orange-Nassau
2. William, Duke of Nassau
10. Wilhelm Georg, Burgrave of Sayn-Hachenburg-Kirchberg
5. Burgravine Louise Isabelle of Kirchberg
11. Princess Isabella Auguste Reuss-Greiz
1. Prince Nikolaus Wilhelm of Nassau
12. Frederick of Württemberg
6. Prince Paul of Württemberg
13. Duchess Augusta of Brunswick-Wolfenbüttel
3. Princess Pauline of Württemberg
14. Frederick, Duke of Saxe-Altenburg
7. Princess Charlotte of Saxe-Hildburghausen
15. Duchess Charlotte Georgine of Mecklenburg-Strelitz
