= Pomeranian =

Pomeranian may refer to:

- of or pertaining to Pomerania, a historical region on the southern shore of the Baltic Sea, split between Poland and Germany

== Peoples and cultures ==
- Pomeranian culture, an Iron Age culture of earlier people in land later called Pomerania
- Pomeranians (Slavic tribe), a medieval West Slavic tribe
- Pomeranians (German people), a German people native to the historical region of Pomerania
- Pomeranian Balts, ancient western Baltic people

== Languages ==
- Pomeranian language, a group of Lechitic dialects spoken by the Slavic Pomeranians of the Middle Ages
- East Pomeranian dialect classified within Low German, spoken by the Pomeranians since the High Middle Ages
- Central Pomeranian dialect classified within Low German, spoken by the Pomeranians since the High Middle Ages

== Animal breeds ==
- Pomeranian dog
- Pomeranian Coarsewool, sheep
- Pomeranian duck
- Pomeranian goose

== Places ==
- Pomeranian Voivodeship, an administrative region in Poland
  - Pomeranian Voivodeship (1466–1772)
  - Pomeranian Voivodeship (1919–1939)
  - Pomeranian (European Parliament constituency), the corresponding constituency

== See also ==
- Pomesanians
- Pomerania Province (disambiguation)
- Pomarine jaeger, carnivorous seabird sometimes erroneously called "Pomeranian skua"
- House of Pomerania
- Duchy of Pomerania
- Farther Pomerania, a subregion of the historic region of Pomerania in north-western Poland
- Swedish Pomerania, a dominion of Sweden 1630–1815
- Western Pomerania, the western extremity of the historic region of Pomerania
- West Pomeranian Voivodeship, Poland
- Kuyavian–Pomeranian Voivodeship, an administrative region in Poland
- East Pomeranian offensive, a Soviet advance in late World War II
