= Count of Merenberg =

Hereditary title of nobility

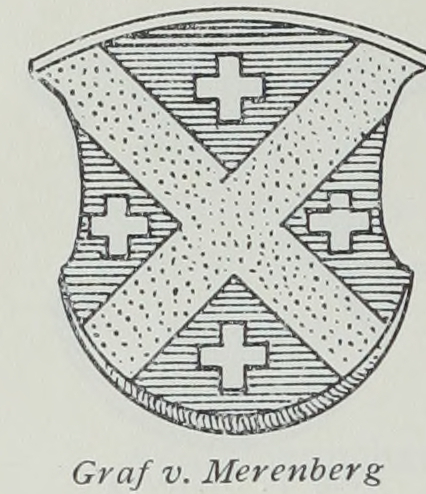
Arms of the Count of Merenberg, 1907

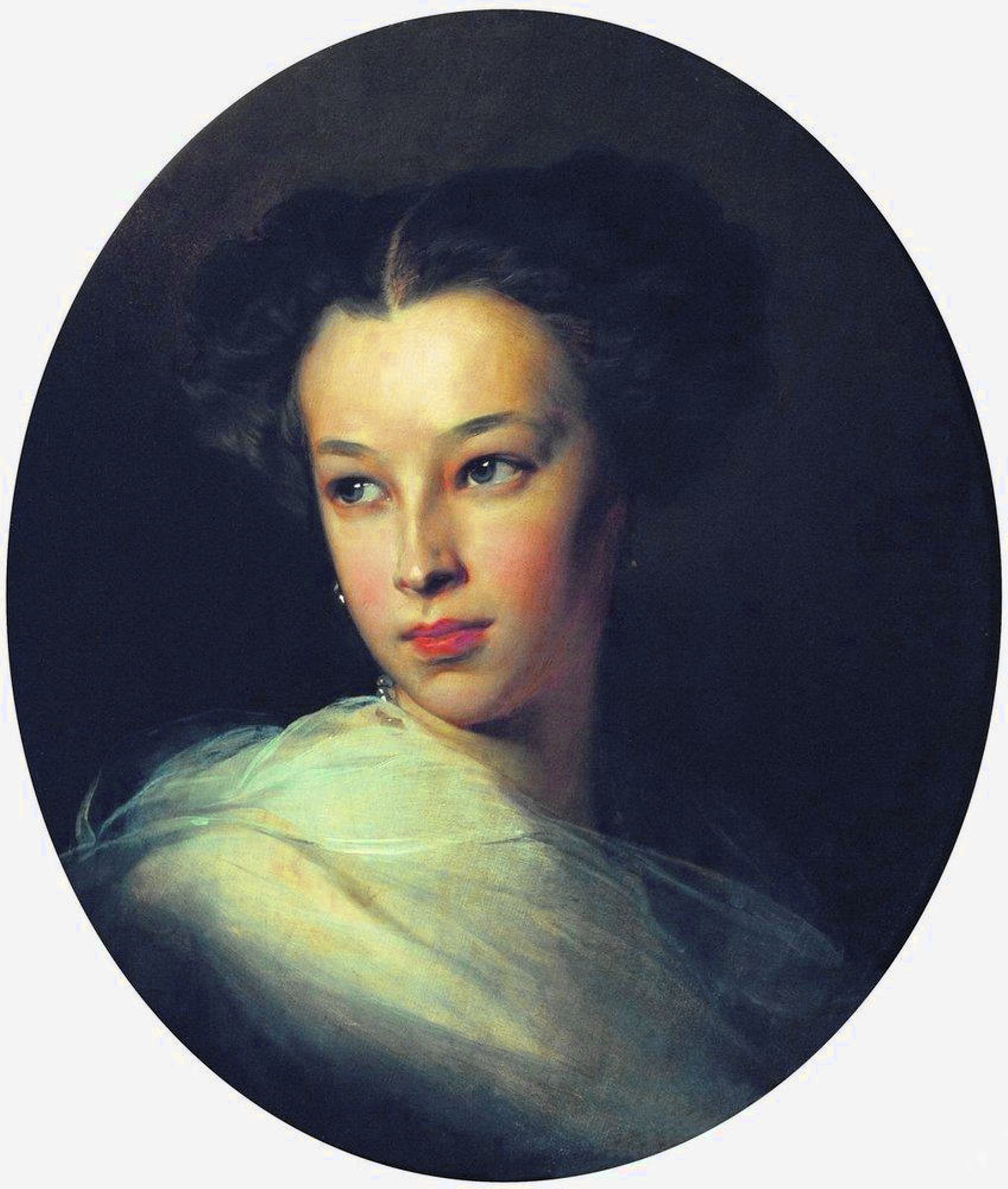
Natalia Pushkina, Countess of Merenberg

Count of Merenberg (German: Graf von Merenberg) is a hereditary title of nobility that was bestowed in 1868 by the reigning Prince of Waldeck and Pyrmont, George Victor, upon the morganatic wife and male-line descendants of Prince Nikolaus Wilhelm of Nassau (1832–1905), who married Natalia Alexandrovna Pushkina (1836–1913), former wife of Russian general Mikhail Leontievich von Dubelt.

== Background ==
Nikolaus was a son of William, Duke of Nassau, and his second wife, Princess Pauline of Württemberg. He was also a younger half-brother of Adolphe, who was deposed by Prussia as last reigning Duke of Nassau in 1866 but succeeded as Grand Duke of Luxembourg in 1890.

Natalia was a daughter of Alexander Pushkin, the most renowned Russian writer. However, he ranked only as a stolbovoy dvoryanin, an untitled member of the ancient landed nobility. As such, she was not legally permitted to share her husband's princely title or rank, even though his family had ceased to be hereditary rulers when the kingdom of Prussia annexed Nassau. By family law, members of the Nassau family could only marry into the reigning or former reigning families of Europe. Therefore, Natalia was created Gräfin von Merenberg (Countess of Merenberg), a title without any territory. The name refers to the community of Merenberg in what is now Hesse, Germany.

Through Pushkin, Natalia descended from Peter the Great's African protégé, Abram Petrovich Gannibal. Through her mother, Natalia descended from the Cossack leader Voivode Petro Doroshenko.

== Family members ==
Their surviving children were:

- Countess Sophie von Merenberg (1868-1927). In 1891, she married Grand Duke Michael Mihailovich of Russia (1861-1929). As this marriage was also deemed morganatic, she was not allowed to share her husband's titles and rank. Instead, she was created Countess de Torby by the Grand Duke of Luxembourg. Her descendants include the current Marquess of Milford Haven and Duke of Westminster .
- Countess Alexandra von Merenberg (1869-1950). She married Máximo de Elía y Ramos Mexía (d. 1929).
- Georg Nikolaus, Count von Merenberg (1871-1948). He had two sons (of whom the elder died young) and one daughter from his first marriage (1895) with Princess Olga Yurievskaya (1874-1925), morganatic daughter of Emperor Alexander II of Russia.

Georg Nikolaus' male line became extinct with the death of his son Georg Michael Alexander, Count von Merenberg (1897-1965). Georg Michael's only child, Countess Clothilde von Merenberg (born 1941), who married Enno von Rintelen, is the last surviving member of the Merenberg family and of the Nassau male line in total.

== The Merenberg Affair ==
When Prince Nikolaus Wilhelm died in 1905, his nephew Grand Duke William IV of Luxembourg (or Guillaume IV) became the last dynastic male of the House of Nassau (after 2 months). If Nikolaus Wilhelm's children had been deemed dynastic, then his son Georg Nikolaus, Count of Merenberg would have succeeded as Head of the House of Nassau upon William IV's death. Georg Nikolaus would have thus become the reigning Grand Duke of Luxembourg.

However, his morganatic birth was deemed insurmountable, despite the fact that he had married a daughter of Tsar Alexander II of Russia. In 1907, William IV, obtained passage of a law in Luxembourg confirming the exclusion of the Merenbergs from succession to the grand ducal throne. Georg Nikolaus's protests against the Luxembourg Diet's confirmation of the succession rights of William IV's daughter, Princess Marie-Adélaïde, were expected to be taken up by the Netherlands and by the Great Powers which had guaranteed Luxembourg's neutrality in 1867. Nonetheless, Marie-Adélaïde did succeed her father, to become Luxembourg's first female monarch, in 1912. In 1919 she, in turn, abdicated in favour of her sister Charlotte, whose descendants have reigned over Luxembourg since then.

The heads of the house of Merenberg after 1912 were:

- Georg Nikolaus (1912–48)
- Georg Michael Alexander (1948–65)
