= William, Duke of Nassau =

Duke of Nassau from 1816 to 1839

William

Duke of Nassau
- Reign: 24 March 1816 – 20 August 1839
- Predecessor: Frederick Augustus
- Successor: Adolphe

Prince of Nassau-Weilburg
- Reign: 9 January 1816 – 24 March 1816
- Predecessor: Frederick William
- Successor: None. Incorporated into the Duchy of Nassau
- Born: 14 June 1792; Kirchheimbolanden, Principality of Nassau-Weilburg
- Died: 20 August 1839 (aged 47); Kissingen, Kingdom of Bavaria
- Burial: Schlosskirche, Weilburg
- Spouse: Princess Louise of Saxe-Hildburghausen (m. 1813; died 1825) Princess Pauline of Württemberg (m. 1829)
- Issue: Princess Auguste; Therese, Duchess Peter Georgievich of Oldenburg; Adolphe, Grand Duke of Luxembourg; Prince Wilhelm Karl; Prince Moritz; Princess Marie Wilhelmine; Prince Wilhelm; Marie, Princess of Wied; Helena, Princess of Waldeck and Pyrmont; Prince Nikolaus Wilhelm; Sophia, Queen of Sweden and Norway
Names
- Georg Wilhelm August Heinrich Belgicus
- House: Nassau-Weilburg
- Father: Frederick William, Prince of Nassau-Weilburg
- Mother: Burgravine Louise Isabelle of Kirchberg
- Religion: Calvinism

Wilhelm (Given names: Georg Wilhelm August Heinrich Belgicus; 14 June 1792, Kirchheimbolanden – 20/30 August 1839, Bad Kissingen) was joint sovereign Duke of Nassau, along with his father's cousin Frederick Augustus, reigning from 1816 until 1839. He was also sovereign Prince of Nassau-Weilburg from 1816 until its incorporation into the duchy of Nassau.

Frederick Augustus died in 1816 and Wilhelm inherited the Usingen territories and became sole sovereign of the Duchy of Nassau. He was the father of Adolphe, Grand Duke of Luxembourg, and Queen Sophia of Sweden and Norway, consort of King Oscar II and a 3rd cousin of William III of the Netherlands, who left a surviving daughter to rule his main realm, but the crown of Luxembourg went through the male line, looking to 17 generations back, to pass to the Duke of Nassau and then his descendants.

== Biography ==
Wilhelm was the eldest son of Frederick William, Duke of Nassau, and Burgravine Louise Isabelle of Kirchberg. With the Nassau troops, he was involved on the Seventh Coalition's side in the Battle of Waterloo against Napoleon.

=== Duke of Nassau ===
On 9 January 1816, he succeeded his father, Duke Frederick William, as the Prince of Nassau-Weilburg and joint Duke of Nassau with his cousin, Frederick Augustus, of the Nassau-Usingen branch of his family. When his cousin and co-Duke died on 24 March 1816, Wilhelm inherited the Usingen territories and became sole ruler of the Duchy of Nassau. He kept the title of Duke of Nassau for the rest of his reign.

=== Marriages and children ===
On 24 June 1813 in Weilburg, Wilhelm married his first wife, Princess Louise of Saxe-Altenburg (28 January 1794 Hildburghausen, Thüringen – 6 April 1825, Biebrich or Weilburg). She was the daughter of Frederick, Duke of Saxe-Altenburg (who, until 1826, had been the last Duke of Saxe-Hildburghausen) and Duchess Charlotte Georgine of Mecklenburg-Strelitz. They had eight children:

- Princess Auguste Luise Friederike Maximiliane Wilhelmine of Nassau-Weilburg (Weilburg, 12 April 1814 – Weilburg, 3 October 1814).
- Princess Therese Wilhelmine Friederike Isabelle Charlotte of Nassau-Weilburg (Weilburg, 17 April 1815 – Prague, 8 December 1871); married in Biebrich on 23 April 1837 Duke Peter of Oldenburg. Their grandson was the Imperial Russian General Grand Duke Nicholas Nikolaevich of Russia the Younger.
- Adolphe, Grand Duke of Luxembourg (24 July 1817 – 17 November 1905); the present Grand Ducal Family of Luxembourg, which became extinct in the male line in 1912, descends from him.
- Prince Wilhelm Karl Heinrich Friedrich of Nassau-Weilburg (Biebrich, 8 September 1819 – Biebrich, 22 April 1823).
- Prince Moritz Wilhelm August Karl Heinrich of Nassau-Weilburg (Biebrich, 21 November 1820 – Vienna, 23 March 1850), unmarried and without legitimate issue.
- Princess Marie Wilhelmine Luise Friederike Henriette of Nassau-Weilburg (Biebrich, 5 April 1822 – Biebrich, 3 April 1824).
- Prince Wilhelm Karl August Friedrich of Nassau-Weilburg (Biebrich, 12 August 1823 – Biebrich, 28 December 1828).
- Princess Marie Wilhelmine Friederike Elisabeth of Nassau-Weilburg (Biebrich, 29 January 1825 – Neuwied, 24 March 1902), married in Biebrich on 20 June 1842 Hermann, Prince of Wied (Neuwied, 22 May 1814 – Neuwied, 5 March 1864). Their daughter Elisabeth married King Carol I of Romania.

Wilhelm married, as his second wife, his first wife's niece, Princess Pauline of Württemberg (Stuttgart, 25 February 1810 – Wiesbaden, 7 July 1856) on 23 April 1829 in Stuttgart. Pauline was the daughter of Prince Paul of Württemberg and Charlotte of Saxe-Hildburghausen.

Wilhelm and Pauline had four children:

- An unnamed daughter (Biebrich, 27 April 1830 – Biebrich, 28 April 1830).
- Princess Helene Wilhelmine Henriette Pauline Marianne of Nassau (Wiesbaden, 12 April 1831 – Bad Pyrmont, 27 October 1888), married in Wiesbaden on 26 September 1853 George Victor, Prince of Waldeck and Pyrmont and had issue. The present Dutch and Swedish royal families descend from this marriage.
- Prince Nikolaus Wilhelm of Nassau (20 September 1832 – 17 September 1905). Married, morganatically, Natalia Alexandrovna Pushkina, Countess of Merenberg. She was the daughter of Alexander Pushkin and Natalya Goncharova. They had issue, now extinct in male line.
- Princess Sophia Wilhelmine Marianne Henriette of Nassau (9 July 1836 – 30 December 1913). Married King Oscar II of Sweden. The present Belgian, Danish, Norwegian and Swedish royal families, as well as the Grand Ducal Family of Luxembourg, descend from this marriage.

== Ancestry ==
Ancestors of William, Duke of Nassau

8. Charles August, Prince of Nassau-Weilburg
4. Charles Christian, Prince of Nassau-Weilburg
9. Princess Auguste Friederike Wilhelmine of Nassau-Idstein
2. Frederick William, Prince of Nassau-Weilburg
10. William IV, Prince of Orange
5. Princess Carolina of Orange-Nassau
11. Anne, Princess Royal
1. William, Duke of Nassau
12. Wilhelm Ludwig, Burgrave of Kirchberg
6. Wilhelm Georg, Burgrave of Kirchberg
13. Wild- and Rhinegravine Louise of Salm-Dhaun
3. Burgravine Louise Isabella of Kirchberg
14. Heinrich XI, Prince Reuss of Greiz
7. Princess Isabelle Auguste Reuss of Greiz
15. Countess Konradine Reuss of Köstritz

William, Duke of Nassau House of Nassau-Weilburg Cadet branch of the House of Nassau Born: June 14 1792 Died: August 20 1839
Regnal titles
Preceded by Frederick William	Prince of Nassau-Weilburg; 1816	Succeeded by None; Incorporated into the Duchy of Nassau
Preceded by Frederick Augustus	Duke of Nassau; 1816–1839	Succeeded by Adolf
