= Princess Pauline of Württemberg (1810–1856) =

Duchess of Nassau from 1829 to 1839

Princess Pauline
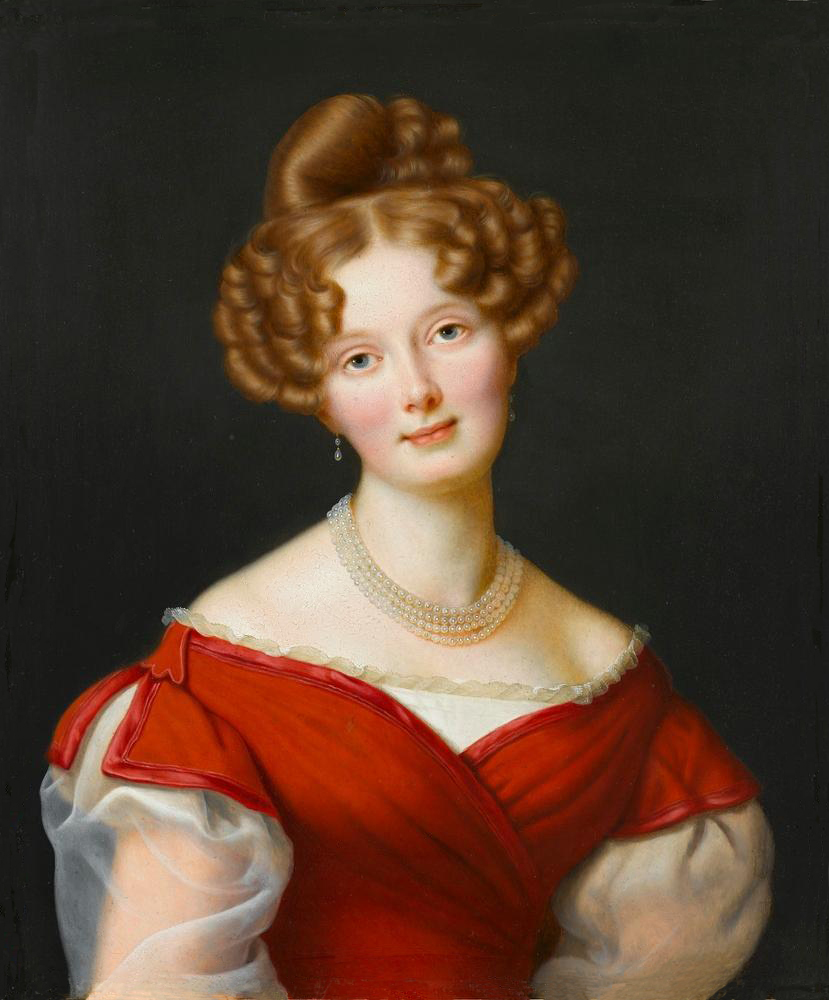
- Portrait by Franz Seraph Stirnbrand, c. 1830

Duchess consort of Nassau
- Tenure: 23 April 1829 – 30 August 1839
- Born: 25 February 1810; Stuttgart, Kingdom of Württemberg, Confederation of the Rhine
- Died: 7 July 1856 (aged 46); Wiesbaden, Duchy of Nassau, German Confederation
- Burial: Alter Friedhof, Wiesbaden
- Spouse: William, Duke of Nassau (m. 1829; died 1839)
- Issue: Helena, Princess of Waldeck and Pyrmont; Prince Nikolaus Wilhelm; Sophia, Queen of Sweden and Norway
- House: Württemberg
- Father: Prince Paul of Württemberg
- Mother: Princess Charlotte of Saxe-Hildburghausen

Princess Pauline Friederike Marie (25 February 1810, Stuttgart – 7 July 1856, Wiesbaden) was Duchess consort of Nassau from 1829 to 1839 as the second wife of William, Duke of Nassau. She was a member of the House of Württemberg and a princess of Württemberg by birth.

Pauline is an ancestress of the present Belgian, Danish, Dutch, Norwegian, and Swedish royal families, as well as the Grand Ducal Family of Luxembourg.

== Early life ==
Born on 25 February 1810 in Stuttgart, Pauline was the fourth child of Prince Paul of Württemberg and Princess Charlotte of Saxe-Hildburghausen.

== Marriage and issue ==
Pauline married William, Duke of Nassau, eldest son of Frederick William, Prince of Nassau-Weilburg and Burgravine Louise Isabelle of Kirchberg, and widower of her aunt Louise on 23 April 1829 in Stuttgart. William was the third cousin of Pauline's father Prince Paul of Württemberg (as great-great-grandsons of King George II of Great Britain), making William and Pauline third cousins once removed. They had four children:

- An unnamed daughter (Biebrich, 27 April 1830 – Biebrich, 28 April 1830).
- Princess Helene Wilhelmine Henriette Pauline Marianne of Nassau (Wiesbaden, 12 April 1831 – Bad Pyrmont, 27 October 1888), married in Wiesbaden on 26 September 1853 George Victor, Prince of Waldeck and Pyrmont, and had issue. The present Dutch and Swedish royal families descend from this marriage.
- Prince Nikolaus Wilhelm of Nassau (20 September 1832 – 17 September 1905). Married, morganatically, Natalia Alexandrovna Pushkina, Countess of Merenberg. She was the daughter of Alexander Pushkin and Natalya Goncharova. They had issue, now extinct in male line.
- Princess Sophia Wilhelmine Marianne Henriette of Nassau (9 July 1836 – 30 December 1913). Married Oscar II of Sweden. The present Belgian, Danish, Norwegian, and Swedish royal families descend from this marriage, as does the Grand Ducal Family of Luxembourg.

== Ancestry ==
Ancestors of Princess Pauline of Württemberg (1810–1856)

8. Frederick II Eugene, Duke of Württemberg
4. Frederick I of Württemberg
9. Princess Friederike of Brandenburg-Schwedt
2. Prince Paul of Württemberg
10. Charles William Ferdinand, Duke of Brunswick
5. Duchess Augusta of Brunswick-Wolfenbüttel
11. Princess Augusta of Great Britain
1. Princess Pauline of Württemberg
12. Ernest Frederick III, Duke of Saxe-Hildburghausen
6. Frederick, Duke of Saxe-Altenburg
13. Princess Ernestine of Saxe-Weimar-Eisenach
3. Princess Charlotte of Saxe-Hildburghausen
14. Charles II, Grand Duke of Mecklenburg-Strelitz
7. Duchess Charlotte Georgine of Mecklenburg-Strelitz
15. Princess Friederike of Hesse-Darmstadt

Princess Pauline of Württemberg (1810–1856) House of Württemberg Born: 25 February 1810 Died: 7 July 1856
German royalty
Vacant Title last held by Louise of Saxe-Hildburghausen	Duchess consort of Nassau; 23 April 1829 – 30 August 1839	Vacant Title next held by Elizabeth Mikhailovna of Russia
