= Natalia Pushkina =

Wife of Alexander Pushkin (1812–1863)

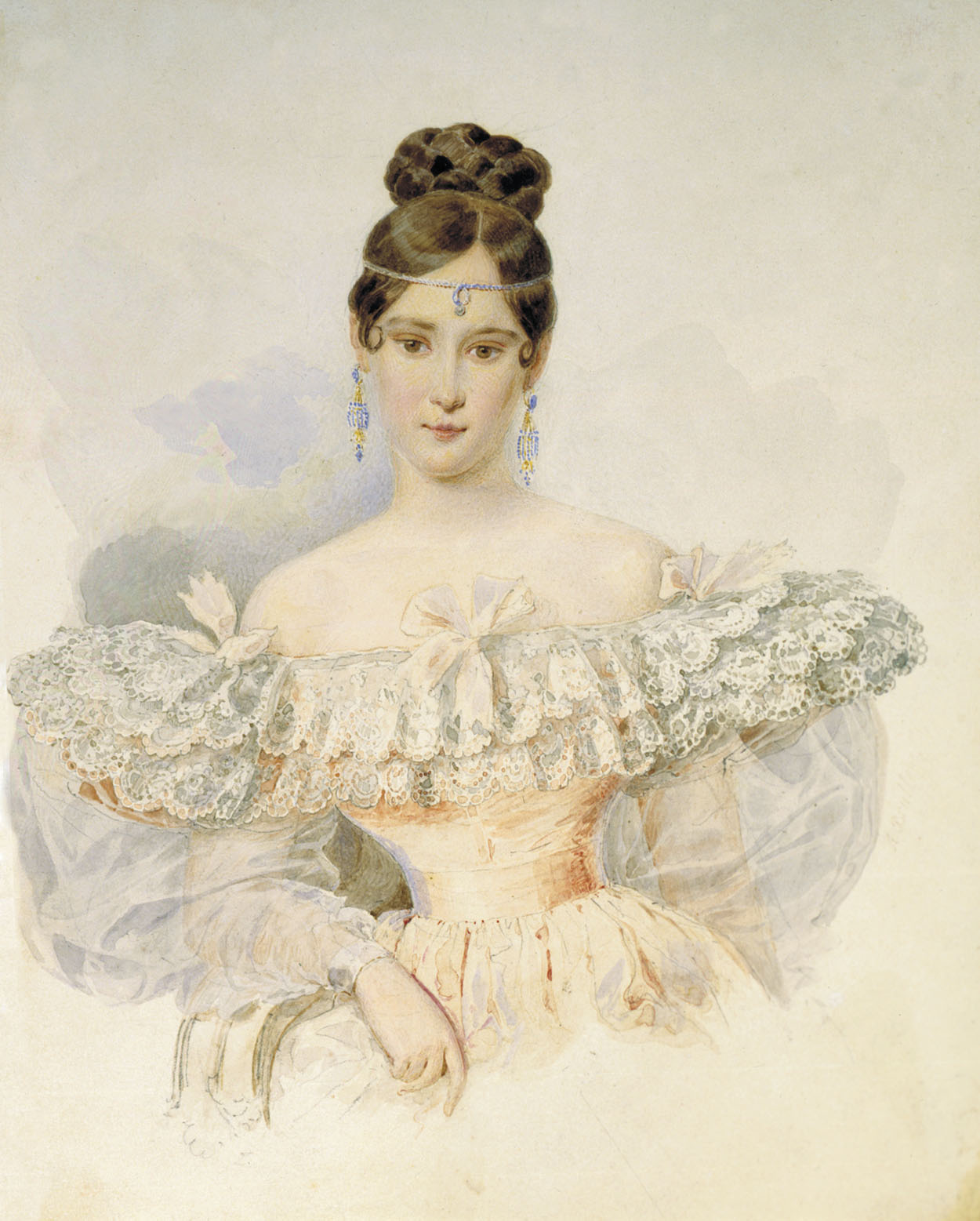
- Portrait by Alexander Brullov, 1831
- Born: Natalia Nikolayevna Goncharova; 8 September 1812; Karian, Tambov Governorate, Russia
- Died: 8 December 1863 (aged 51); Saint Petersburg, Russia
- Burial place: Lazarevskoe Cemetery, St. Petersburg
- Spouses: Alexander Pushkin (m. 1831; died 1837); Petr Petrovich Lanskoy (m. 1844)
- Children: 7

Natalia Nikolayevna Pushkina-Lanskaya (Russian: Наталья Николаевна Пушкина-Ланская; née Goncharova [Гончарова]; 8 September [O.S. 27 August] 1812 – 8 December [O.S. 26 November] 1863) was the wife of the Russian poet Alexander Pushkin from 1831 until his death in 1837 in a duel with Georges d'Anthès. Natalia was married to Major-General Pyotr Lanskoy from 1844 until her death in 1863.

== Prior to marriage ==
Natalia (Natalya) Goncharova was born on 8 September [O.S. 27 August] 1812 in the village of Karian in Tambov Governorate (in present-day Znamensky District, Tambov Oblast), where her family lived during the occupation of Moscow by the forces of Napoleon. Her father, Nikolay Afanasievich Goncharov, a scion of the noble family of paper manufacturing business owners from Kaluga, was pronounced demented in 1815; the household was managed by his wife, Natalia Ivanovna Zagryazhskaya, an imperious lady with connections within Muscovite nobility.

Natalie (as she was familiarly known) met Alexander Pushkin at the age of 16, when she was one of the most talked-about beauties of Moscow. A.N. Muraviev recalls: "Pushkin himself, after the turbulent years of his youth, was passionately in love with the Moscow beauty Goncharova, who could really serve as an ideal of perfect Greek beauty, and he expressed his heartfelt mood in an original way with a light couplet:

Я влюблен, я очарован,

Словом, я огончарован.

I'm in love, I am charmed,

In one word, I am Goncharmed.

== Marriage to Pushkin ==
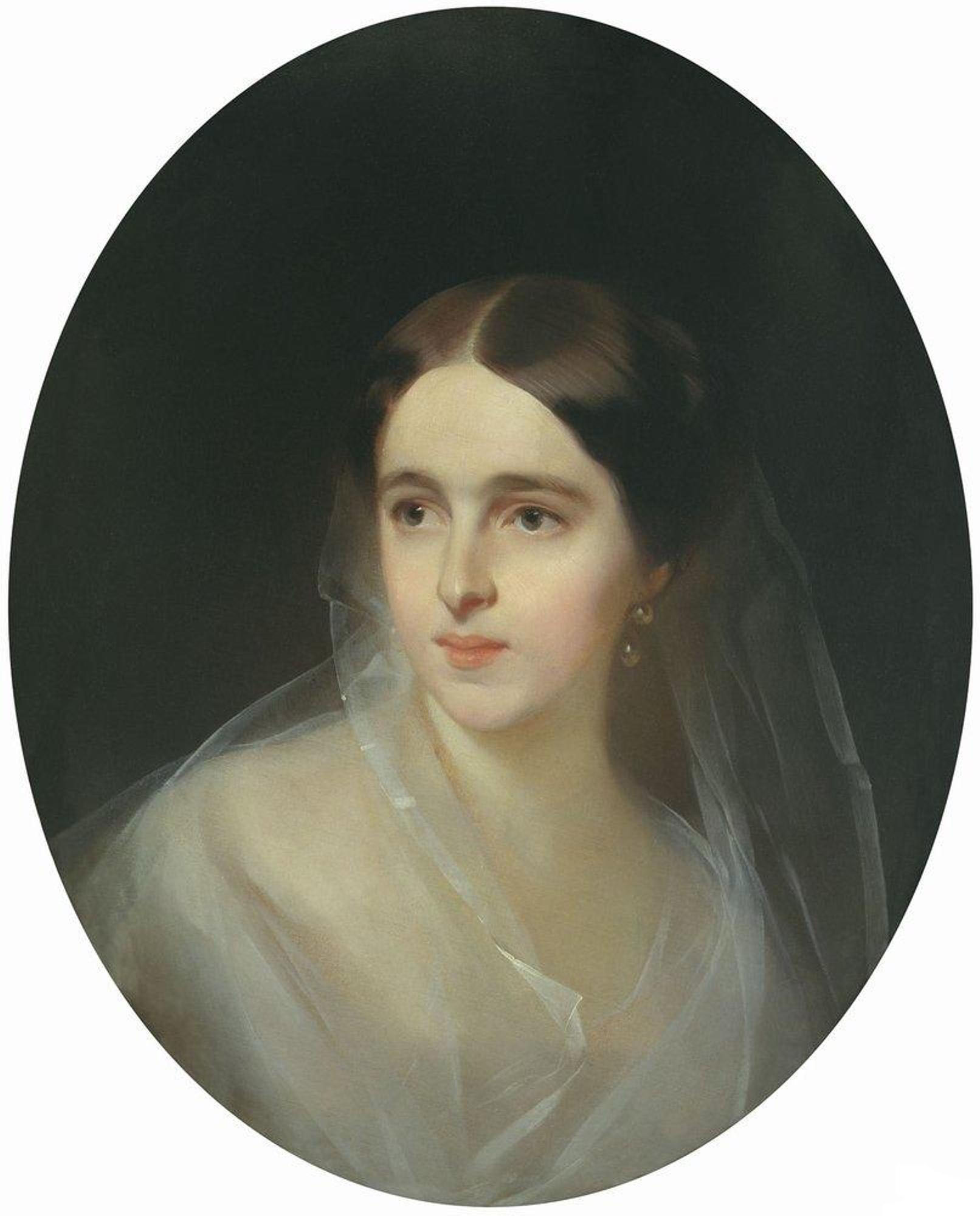
Natalia Nikolayevna Goncharova, 1849. Portrait by Ivan Makarov

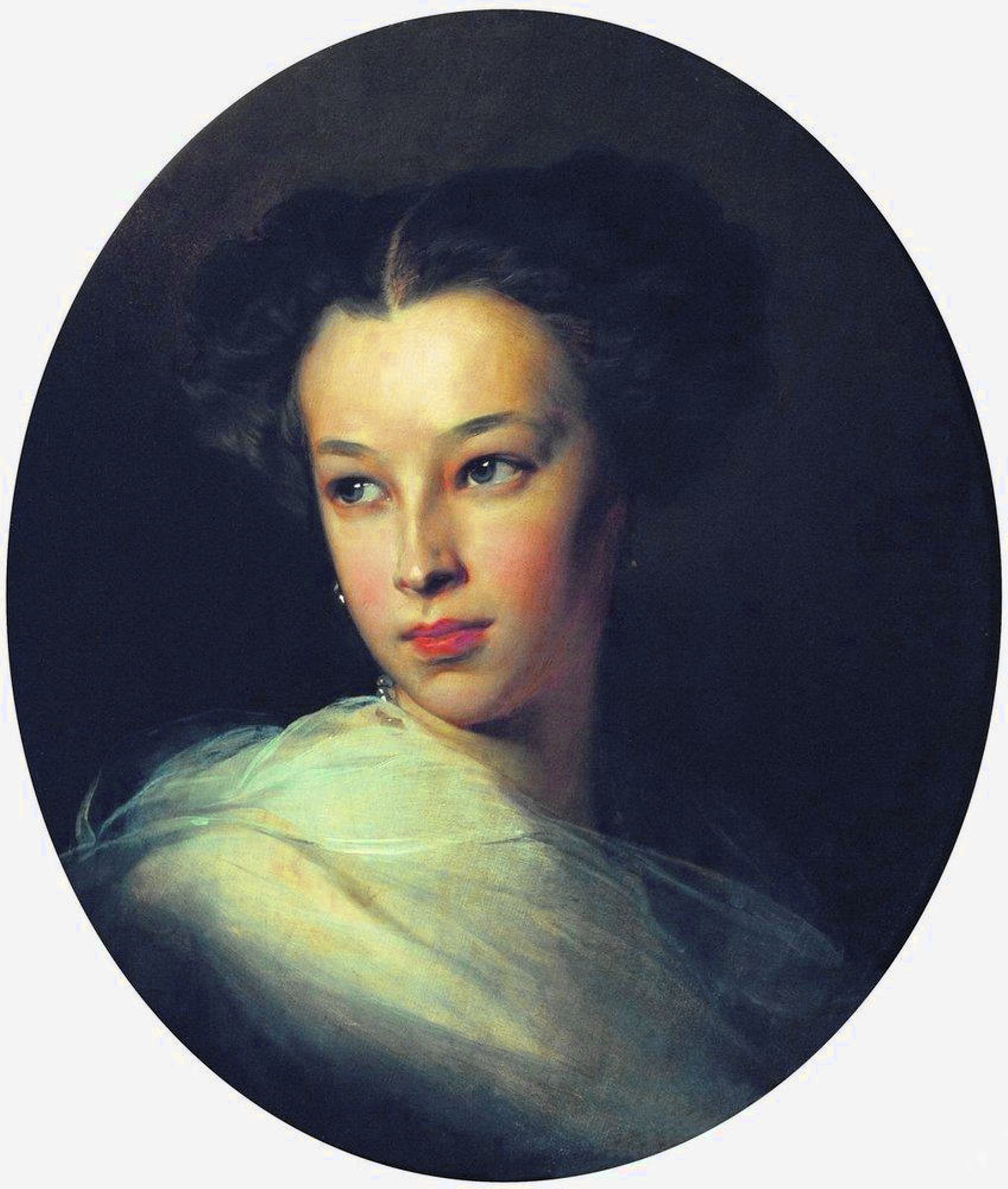
Natalia Alexandrovna Pushkina, Pushkin's daughter, 1849. Portrait by Ivan Makarov

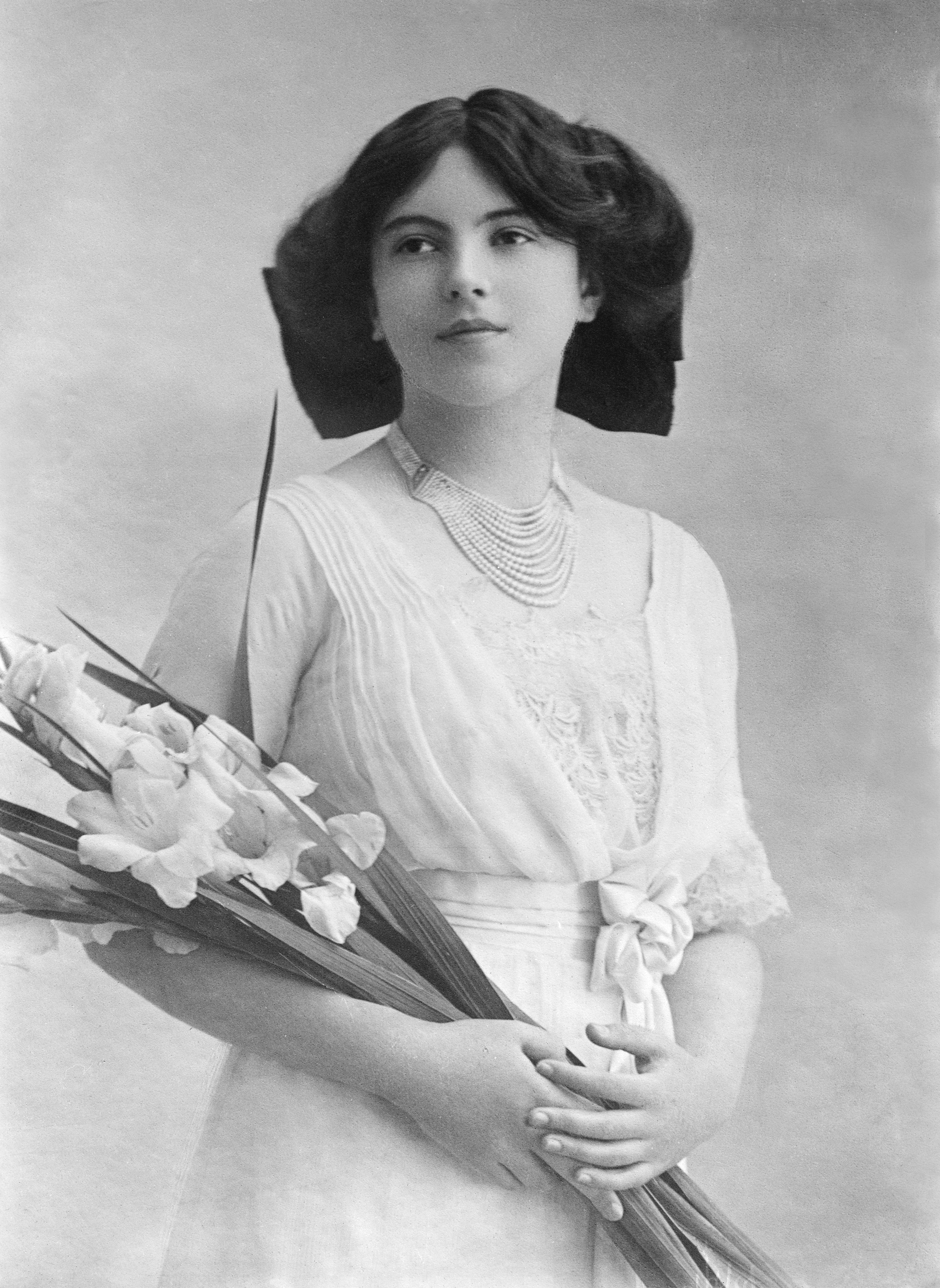
Natalia's granddaughter Nadejda Mountbatten, Marchioness of Milford Haven

After many hesitations, Natalia eventually accepted a proposal of marriage from Pushkin in April 1830, but not until she had received assurances that the tsarist government did not intend to persecute the libertarian poet. They were officially engaged on 6 May 1830, and sent out wedding invitations. Because of the outbreak of cholera and other circumstances, the wedding was delayed for a year. The ceremony took place on 2 March [O.S. 18 February] 1831 in the Great Ascension Church on Bolshaya Nikitskaya Street in Moscow.

During the six years of their marriage, Natalia Pushkina gave birth to four children: Maria (b. 1832, suggested as a prototype of Anna Karenina), Alexander (b. 1833), Grigory (b. 1835), and Natalia (b. 1836) (who married into the royal House of Nassau-Weilburg to Nikolaus Wilhelm of Nassau and became Countess of Merenberg). As the family lived in the country for prolonged periods, while Pushkin spent most of his time in the capitals, there was a sizeable correspondence between Natalia and Pushkin. Seventy-eight letters from Pushkin to Natalia remain; they are frequently written in a light-hearted tone with touches of ribaldry, but none of them could be called love letters. It is believed that the poet dedicated several poems to her, including "Madonna" (1830). Natalya's correspondence with Pushkin was lost except for one letter, written together with her mother Natalia Ivanovna.

== Reputed affair with D'Anthès ==
In 1835, Natalia met a French immigrant, Georges-Charles de Heeckeren d'Anthès, and was involved in a society intrigue, which provoked rumours of an affair with D'Anthès. These resulted in a duel between Pushkin and D'Anthès on 27 January 1837, in which Pushkin was mortally wounded. Commentators disagree about the propriety of Natalia's behaviour in this situation. Some, including Anna Akhmatova and Marina Tsvetaeva, covertly, or overtly, blamed Pushkin's death on her, feeling that she did not understand his greatness and failed to take an appropriate interest in his art. It does seem that she preferred worldly pleasures to his company, though to some extent she was obliged to socialise separately from him; for example, even during her pregnancies, she often had to chaperone her sisters in the court, since there was no one else to do so, and only by going into society could they find husbands. Her constant demands for money for costly dresses and jewellery forced the poet to write increasingly for money rather than for pleasure.

However, modern research into archival materials and contemporary memoirs, including those of family members (who always mentioned Natalia Nikolayevna with great warmth and respect), leads to a more sympathetic view. It stands to her credit that she preserved Pushkin's letters to her, which suggests that she had some idea of the significance of his written heritage, and subsequently she allowed them to be published.

== Second marriage and death ==
In 1843, Natalia met Petr Petrovich Lanskoy (1799–1877), who served at the same regiment as her brother. She had been courted by many worthy suitors, but Lanskoy won her heart by promising to take care of her children as of his own ones. Their wedding was held in Strelna on 16 July 1844. Lanskoy was in favour with the tsar, and had a remarkable career before his marriage. Following the marriage, Natalia gave birth to three daughters: Alexandra (b. 1845), Elizaveta (b. 1846) and Sophia (b. 1848). Natalia died on 26 November 1863 and was buried in the cemetery of the Alexander Nevsky Lavra.
