= Natalia Alexandrovna Pushkina =

Daughter of Alexander Pushkin, Countess of Merenberg

- Countess of Merenberg
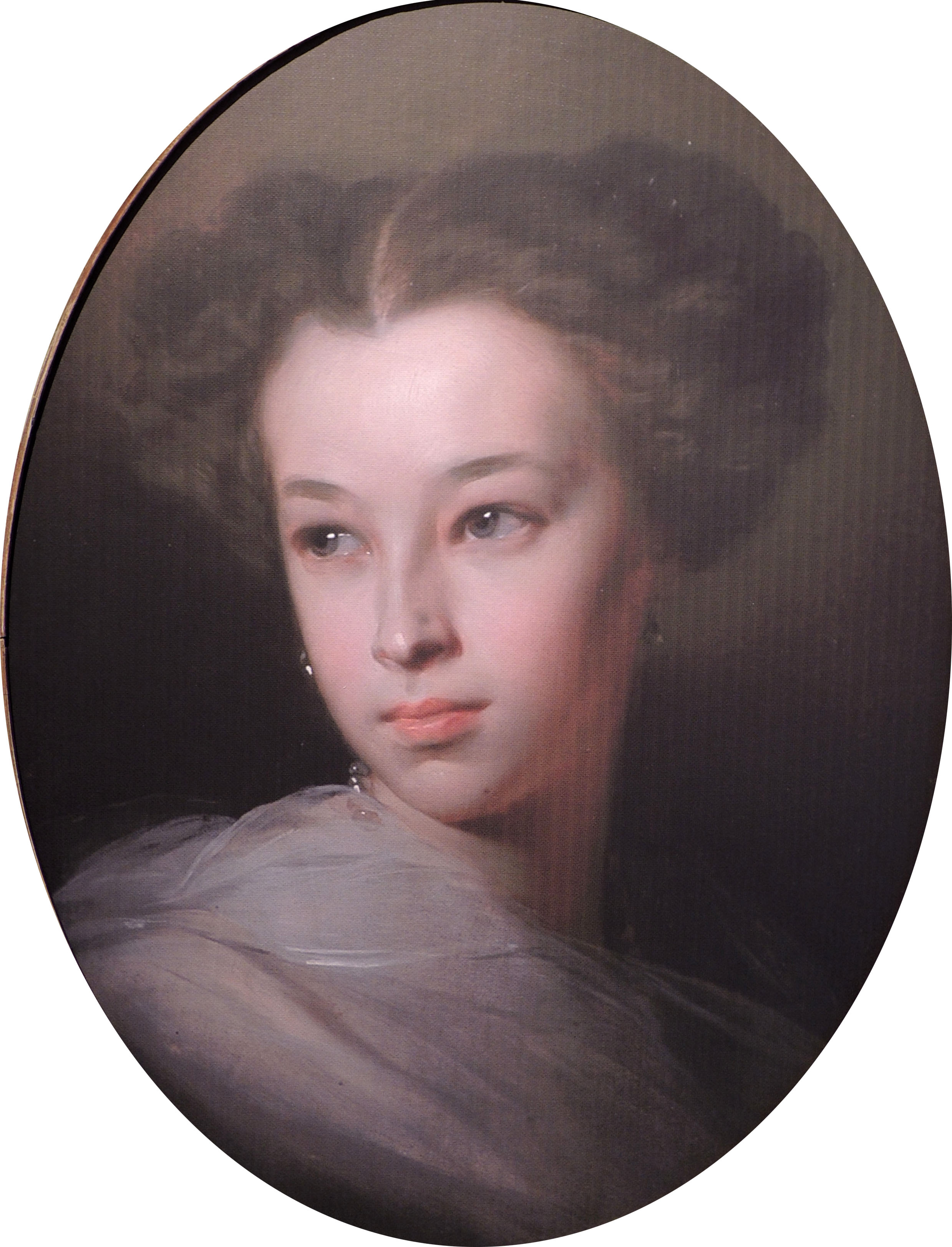
- Born: 4 June 1836; Saint Petersburg, Russian Empire
- Died: 23 March 1913 (aged 76); Cannes, France
- Spouses: Mikhail Leontievich Dubelt (m. 1853; div. 1868) Prince Nikolaus Wilhelm of Nassau (m. 1868; died 1905)
- Issue: Natalya Mikhailovna Dubelt; Leonty Mikhailovich Dubelt; Anna Mikhailovna Dubelt; Countess Sophie of Merenberg; Alexandra Nikolaevna von Merenberg; Georg-Nikolai von Merenberg
- Father: Alexander Pushkin
- Mother: Natalia Goncharova

Natalia Alexandrovna Pushkina, later Countess of Merenberg (4 June [O.S. 23 May] 1836, Saint Petersburg – 23 March [O.S. 10 March] 1913, Cannes) was the daughter of Alexander Pushkin and the morganatic wife of Prince Nikolaus Wilhelm of Nassau.

== Biography ==
Natalia Alexandrovna Pushkina was born on 4 June 1836 in Kamenny Island, Saint Petersburg. Her father was poet Alexander Pushkin. She was baptised in the Church of the Nativity of John the Baptist a month later. Her godparents were Mikhail Vielgorsky and Ekaterina Ivanovna Zagryazhskaya. Natalia Alexandrovna's father died when she was eight months old.

In her youth, Natalia Alexandrovna was in love with Prince Nikolay Alexeyevich Orlov, who returned her feelings and wished to marry her. Orlov's father considered Pushkina an unsuitable bride for his son and did not allow their marriage.

At the age of seventeen, Natalia Alexandrovna accepted a proposal from Mikhail Leontievisch Dubelt. Both her mother and stepfather, Peter Lanskoy, were against the marriage because Dubelt had a reputation of womanizing and violence. Natalia Alexandrovna insisted on the match, fearing she would otherwise remain unmarried like her older sister. Her mother wrote to Pyotr Vyazemsky:

"The imp Tasha quickly moved from childhood to adulthood, but there is nothing to do - you can't bypass fate. I'ven been fighting it for a year not, finally, thanks to the will of God and Dubelt's impatience. My only fear is her youth, in other words, her childishness."

The marriage took place in 1853. They separated in 1862, and Natalia Alexandrovna moved abroad with her two eldest children to live with her aunt, Alexandra Friesengoff and mother. Dubelt followed his wife to the estate, her sister, Alexandra wrote:

"The summer months passed in constant troubles and endless unrest. Dubelt, who was the first to give this idea to his wife [about leaving], soon changed his mind, refused his word, came to Hungary himself, first to confess, when it turned out to be unsuccessful, he gave rein to his unbridled, frantic character. It's hard to even remember the scenes that took place until, at the insistence of Baron Friesengoff, he left the estate, giving his wife temporary peace. Her situation was hopeless. Sister did not lose heart: she was supported by extraordinary fortitude and willpower, but mother suffered for both."

A lengthy divorce process began. Natalia Alexandrovna lived abroad for a long time. At this time, her mother gave her 75 letters written by Pushkin, so that if she fell on difficult time, she could publish them. In 1876, Natalia Alexandrovna, then Countess of Merenberg, turned to Ivan Turgenev for help in editing and publishing these letters. The letters were received poorly, both by the public, and by her brothers who were not consulted.

After the marriage had finally been dissolved, Natalia Alexandrovna married Prince Nikolaus of Nassau. They had first met in Russia at one of the balls during the coronation celebrations of Alexander II. The prince had arrived in Russia, acting as a representative of the Nassau court.

In 1882, the original copies of 64 letters from Pushkin to his wife were donated to the Rumyantsev Museum. Natalia Alexandrovna gave the remaining letters to her daughter Sophie.

Natalia Alexandrovna died of an embolism in Cannes, France on 23 March 1913. She was cremated, and her ashes were spread on the grave of her second husband in Wiesbaden.

== Marriages and Children ==
In 1852 she married Mikhail Leontievich Dubelt (1822-1900) and had three children:

- Natalia Mikhailovna Dubelt (1854-1925), married Arnold Hermann Joseph Johann Nepomuk Franz Xaver Leopold von Bessel (1827-1887).
- Leonty Mikhailovich Dubelt (1855-1894), captain of the second rank, married Agrippina Grigorievna Miklashevskaya on 28 April 1891.
- Anna Mikhailovna Dubelt (1861-1919), married titular councilor, Alexander Pavlovich Kondyrev (1855-1900).

The couple divorced in 1868. After which, Leonty and Natalia were raised by their mother's stepfather, Pyotr Petrovich Lanskoy, and Anna was raised by her father's aunt, Bazilevskaya.

Natalia Alexandrovna married Prince Nikolaus Wilhelm of Nassau in London on 1 July 1868. As her father was an untitled nobleman, she was unable to share her husband's rank and title. In 1868, her sister-in-law's husband, George Victor, Prince of Waldeck and Pyrmont granted her the title 'Countess of Merenberg'. This marriage produced three children:

- Countess Sophie (1868-1927), married morganatically Grand Duke Michael Mikhailovich of Russia (1861-1929), created Countess de Torby by her uncle Adolphe, Grand Duke of Luxembourg, had issue.
- Countess Alexandrine (1869-1950), married Argentinian Don Maximo de Eli, no issue.
- Count Georg Nikolaus (1871-1948), married Princess Olga Alexandrovna Yurievskaya, had issue.
