= Gannibal family =

Russian noble family

Gannibal Ганнибалы Hannibal, Ganibal
- Noble family
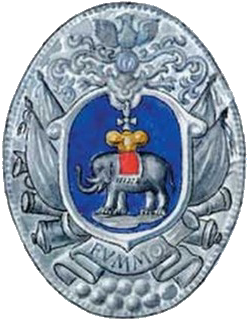
- Medallion featuring coat of arms with elephant with a crown and the motto "FVMMO"
- Country: Russian Empire
- Earlier spellings: Petrov
- Etymology: Named by Abram Petrovich after the ancient Carthaginian general Hannibal
- Origin: Central Africa (historically linked to Logone-Birni in modern-day Cameroon or Eritrea)
- Founded: 1742 (Ennobled by Empress Elizabeth of Russia)
- Founder: Abram Petrovich Gannibal
- Historic seat: Mikhaylovskoye
- Titles: Noble
- Connected members: Alexander Pushkin
- Connected families: Pushkin family
- Traditions: Russian Orthodox
- Motto: FVMMO ("Fortune Has Changed My Life Entirely" (Latin: Fortuna Vitam Meam Mutavit Oppido) or "Homeland" (Kotoko))

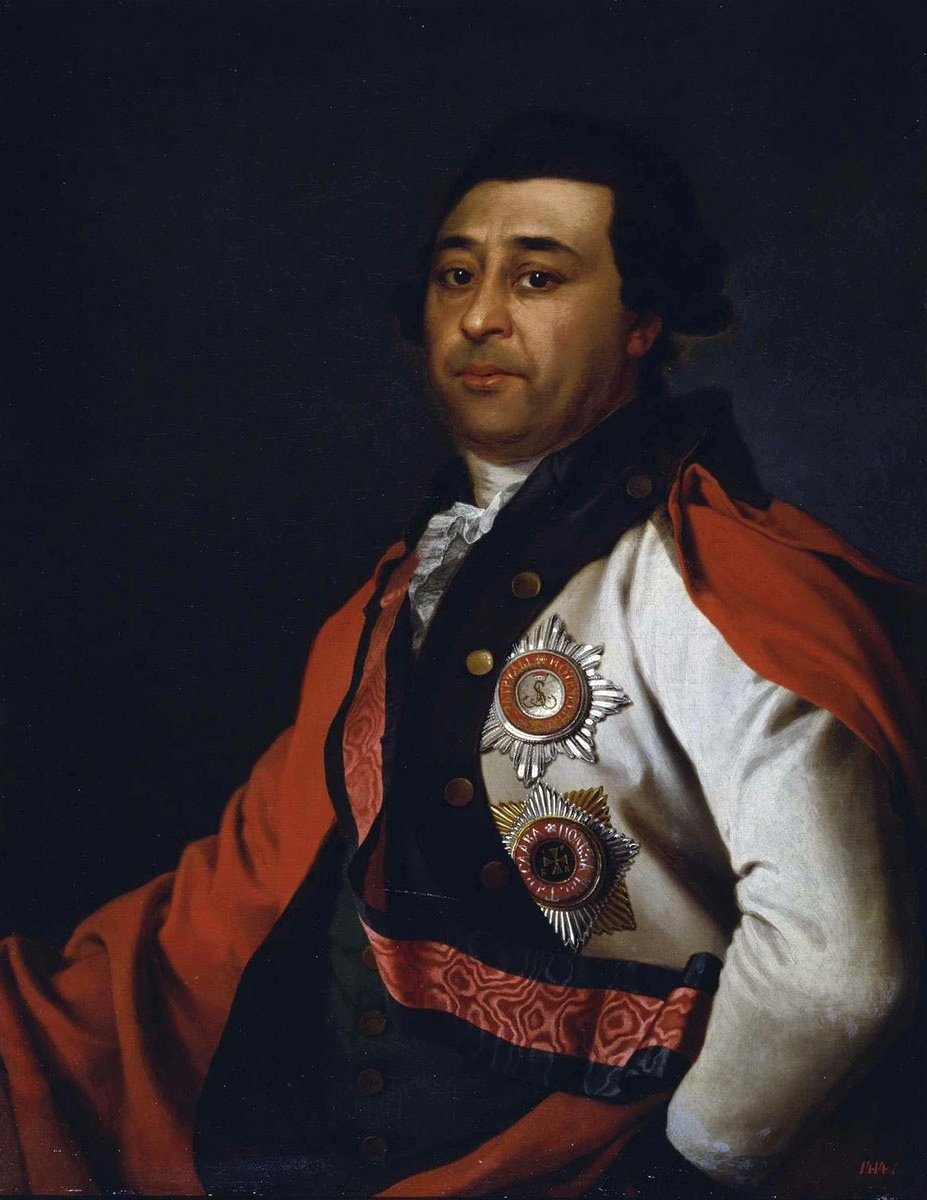
Ivan Gannibal (1735–1801), general-in-chief and the son of Abram Gannibal (1696–1781)

The Gannibal family (Russian: Ганнибалы, romanized: Gannibaly) was a Russian noble family that was established by Abram Petrovich Gannibal (1696–1781), an African-born general-in-chief, military engineer, nobleman, and a godson of Emperor Peter I, who raised him in his court.

== Family history ==
The family was ennobled by Empress Elizabeth and produced many accomplished figures, like Alexander Pushkin (1799–1837), a famous poet and novelist, and a maternal great-grandson of Abram through his mother, Nadezhda Ossipovna Gannibal (1775–1836).

Abram's eldest son, Ivan Gannibal (1735–1801), served as a general-in-chief, naval commander, and was a founder of Kherson. Another one of Abram’s 10 children was Pyotr Abramovich Gannibal (1742–1826), a high-ranking major general of the artillery.

== Notable members ==
- Abram Petrovich Gannibal (c. 1696 – 1781), Patriarch of the family; Major-General, Chief Military Engineer, Governor of Reval, and godson of Peter the Great.
- Ivan Gannibal (1735–1801), General-in-Chief in the Imperial Russian Navy, and founder of the city of Kherson.
- Pyotr Abramovich Gannibal (1742–1826), Major-General in the artillery, and informant for Alexander Pushkin's biographical novel The Moor of Peter the Great.

== See also ==
- Afro-Russians
