= Afro-Russians =

Ethnic group

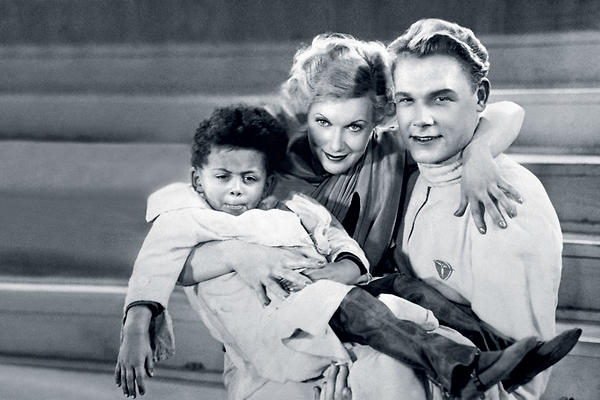
- James Patterson, Lyubov Orlova and Sergei Stolyarov. From the movie Circus (1936)

Total population
- 30,000 (2013); 40,000 to 70,000 (2009)

Regions with significant populations
- Moscow, Astrakhan, Yekaterinburg

Languages
- Russian · Abkhaz · Niger–Congo languages · Nilo-Saharan languages · English · French · Spanish

Religion
- Predominantly Christianity

Afro-Russians (Russian: Афророссияне, romanized: Afrorossiyane), commonly known as Black Russians (Russian: Русские негры, romanized: Russkie negry), are citizens of Russia who have any ancestry from any of the Black racial groups of Africa. The Metis Foundation estimates that there were about 30,000 Afro-Russians in 2013.

== Terminology ==
Representatives of African peoples in the Russian language have been commonly called negry. The word negr comes from Spanish: negro (the color black in Spanish) through other European languages (German: Neger, French: nègre).

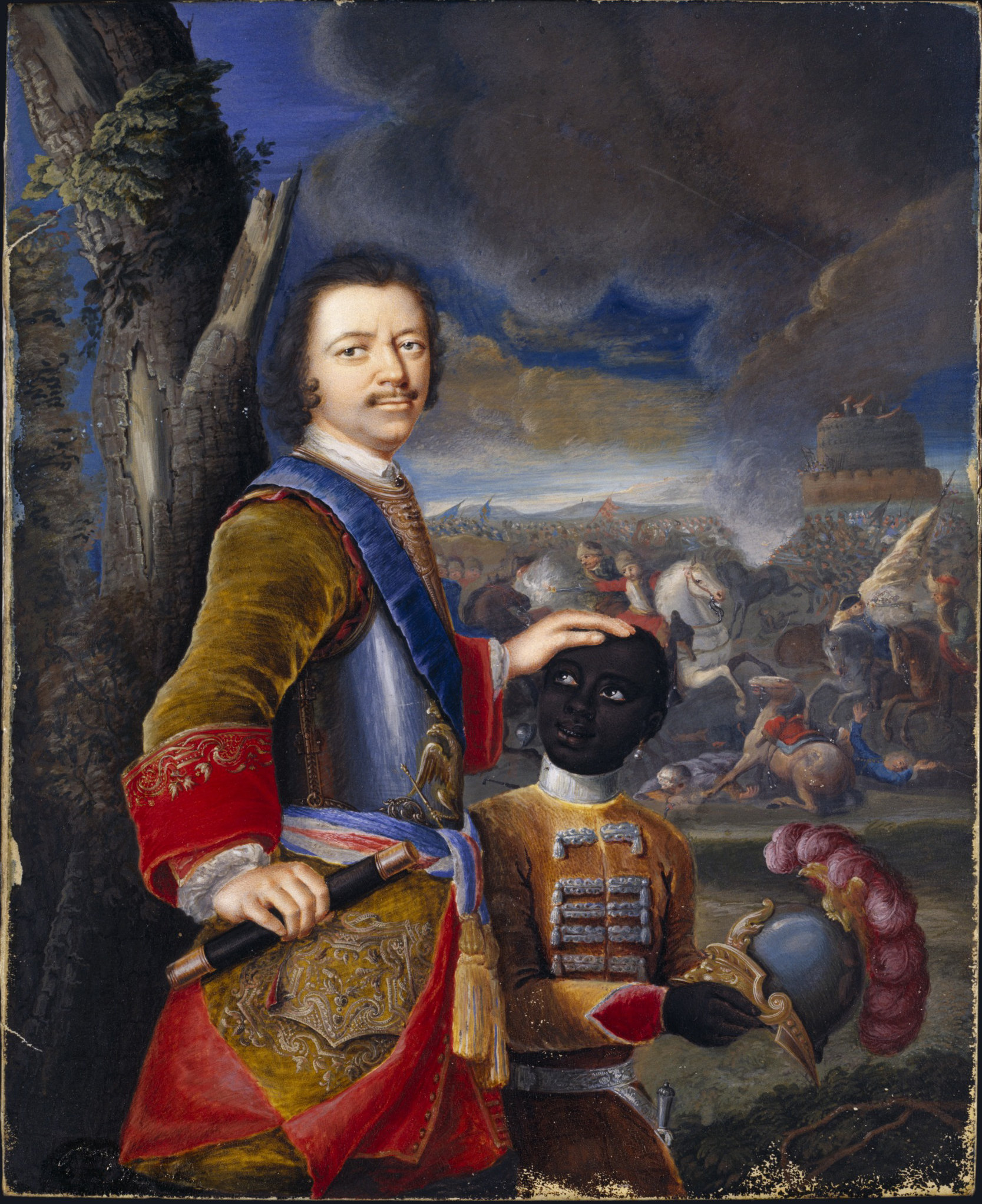
Peter the Great, Tsar of Russia (1672–1725), and his page-boy

== History ==
=== Russian Empire ===
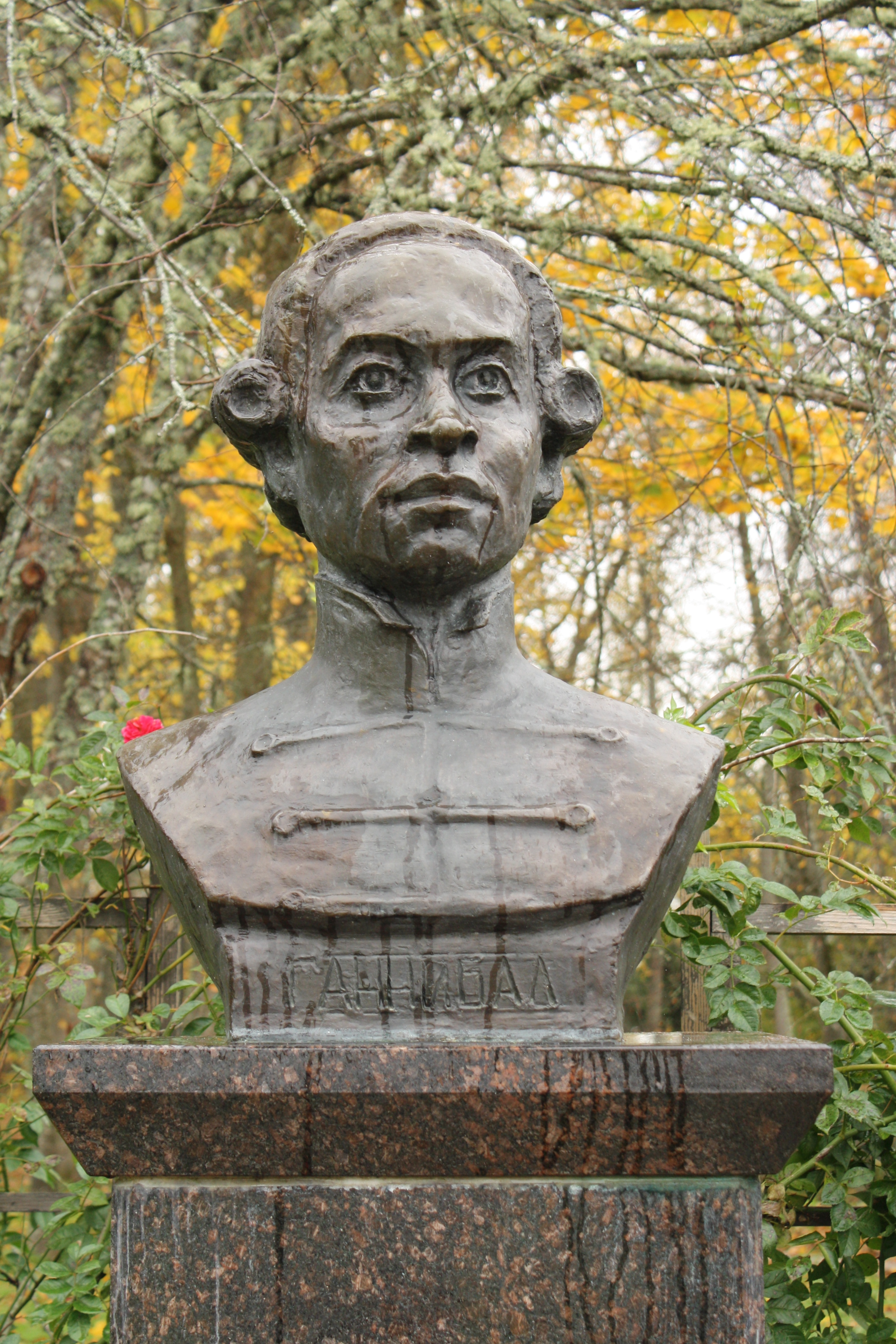
Bust of Abram Gannibal, Russian military engineer, general-in-chief, and nobleman

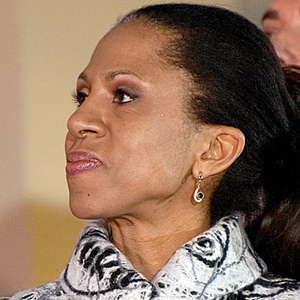
Yelena Khanga, Russian journalist and writer

There was never an observable number of people of African descent in Russia, even after Western European colonization of the continent. For centuries Russia was too isolated to interact with Africa. Russia's non-involvement in the colonization of Africa or the Atlantic slave trade prevented it from developing significant relationships with African tribes or colonies. Despite this, Abram Petrovich Gannibal, a Russian of princely African descent, became a general and nobleman in the Russian Empire. After being kidnapped from Logone (in contemporary Cameroon) by Ottoman forces as a boy, he was sold to Russian diplomat Fedor Golovin in 1704 and gifted to Tsar Peter the Great, who freed and adopted him. As an adult, he rose to nobility, and served the Russian Empire in both civil and military capacities. He is also a maternal great-grandfather to the famed Russian poet Alexander Pushkin.

=== Early Soviet period ===
After the revolution, several African-American families came to the Soviet Union under the auspices of the Comintern. Among them were Oliver John Golden and his wife Bertha Bialek, bringing with them a group of 16 African-American experts in the cultivation of cotton; well-known African-American poet Langston Hughes with a group of 22 filmmakers; Paul Robeson with his family; and many others. Some of them stayed in Russia and their descendants still live there.

=== Post-War, the Festival Children ===
When African nations gained independence from colonialism, the Soviet Union offered scholarships to young people from these nations. About 400,000 Africans studied in the former Soviet Union between the late 1950s and 1990.

The mixed race African descended children were called "festival children" because of their appearance and timing of their birth. Festival children is a household stereotype or cliché that appeared under the Soviet Union in the 1960s-1980s, implying that children were born to Soviet people and one of the parents could be a person from Africa, Latin America, or foreign Asia. Specifically, this phraseology refers to those born under the Soviet Union from different ethnicities or nations that are distant around the world.

It is believed that the first significant arrival of Africans, mestizos and mulattoes was for the 6th World Festival of Youth and Students held in Moscow in 1957. Presumably, the combination of these words could have been influenced by the opening line of the festival's anthem: "Children of different nations, we live the dream of peace...". ("Hymn of the Democratic Youth").

Many African students began coming to study in the USSR in the late 1950s, of whom many attended the Peoples' Friendship University named after Patrice Lumumba (now Patrice Lumumba Peoples' Friendship University of Russia).

== Notable Afro-Russians ==
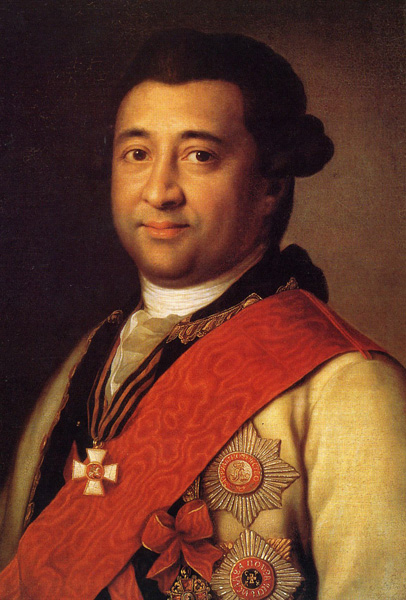
Ivan Gannibal, Russian military leader

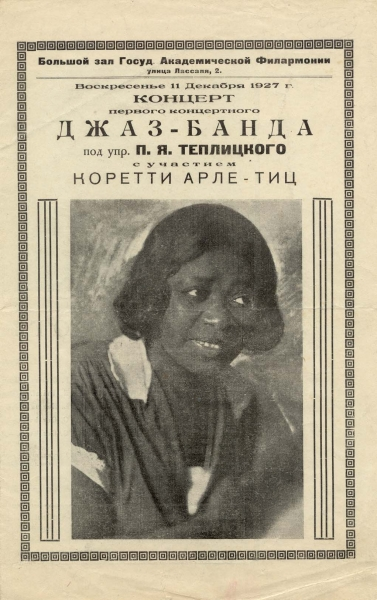
Coretti Arle-Titz, singer, dancer, and actress in the Russian Empire and the Soviet Union

- Abram Gannibal (1696–1781) – statesman, military leader, and politician, great-grandfather of Alexander Pushkin.
- Ivan Gannibal (1735–1801) – military leader, the son of Abram Gannibal.
- Alexander Pushkin (1799-1837) - was a Russian poet, playwright, and novelist of the Romantic era. He is considered by many to be the greatest Russian poet, as well as the founder of modern Russian literature, great-grandson of Abram Gannibal.
- Lyukman Adams (born 1988) – half-Nigerian triple jumper
- Aleksandr Alumona (born 1983) – half-Nigerian footballer
- Jacques Anthony (born 1992) – rapper
- Benes Ayo (born 1979) - Latvian-born communist
- Coretti Arle-Titz (1881–1951) – black American born actress and singer
- Allan Dugblei (born 1985) – half-Ghanaian footballer
- Alice Edun – half-Nigerian singer
- Nkeirouka Ezekh (born 1983) – half-Nigerian Olympic curler
- Brian Idowu (born 1992) – three quarters-Nigerian Russian Premier League footballer
- Victor Keyru (born 1984) – Sierra Leonian-Russian basketball player
- Yelena Khanga (born 1962) – Russian journalist and TV anchor of Zanzibari-American descent
- Stanislav Lebamba (born 1988) – half-Congolese footballer
- Cyrille Makanda (born 1980) – half-Cameroonian basketball player
- Avua-Siav Leo Nelson (born 1980) – half-Ghanaian footballer
- Peter Odemwingie (born 1981) – half-Nigerian footballer
- Adessoye Oyewole (born 1982) – half-Nigerian footballer
- James Lloydovich Patterson (1933-2025) – Russian child actor, naval officer, and poet of African-American and Russian descent
- Jean Sagbo (1959-2024) – Beninese-Russian politician. Elected councilman of the town of Novozavidovo
- Maria Skorsiuk (1872–1901), ballet dancer
- Antonio Souza-Kordeiru (born 1993) - Afro-Cuban parentage
- Jerry-Christian Tchuissé (born 1975) – Cameroonian-Russian footballer
- Emiliya Turey (born 1984) – part-Sierra Leonean handball player
- Grigory Siyatvinda (born 1970) – part-Zambian actor
- Pula (born 1980) – Brazilian born Russian futsal player
- Elladj Baldé (born 1990) – half-Guinean figure skater
- Isabel dos Santos (born 1973) – half-Angolan businesswoman
- Epiphanny Prince (born 1988) – Russian-American basketball player
- Ari (born 1985) – Brazilian born Russian football player
- Greta Onieogou (born 1991) – half Nigerian half Russian Canadian actress
- Zhosselina Maiga – half Malian basketball player
- Artyom Ntumba (born 2003) – half Congolese, half Russian footballer
- Victor Cole (born 1968) – half Sierra Leonean, half Russian Major League Baseball player
- Pierre Narcisse (1977-2022) – Cameroonian-born Russian singer

== Social movements ==
Afro-Russian social movements have emerged in recent years as a response to the discrimination and marginalization experienced by people of Russian-African descent.

The Sputnik Association is a social movement founded in London, UK in 2006 by a group of Russian emigrants and Afro-Russian people. The association was created to provide a platform for Russian emigrants and mixed-race Russian people living abroad to connect and celebrate their shared cultural heritage.

== See also ==
- Afro-Abkhazians
- Racism in Russia#Africans
