= Sagbo =

Sagbo is a surname. Notable people with the surname include:

- Jean Sagbo (born 1959), Beninese-born Russian politician
- Yannick Sagbo (born 1988), French footballer
