= 6th World Festival of Youth and Students =

1957 event in the Soviet Union

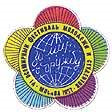
- Host country: Union of Soviet Socialist Republics
- Dates: 28 July - 5 August 1957
- Motto: For Peace and Friendship
- Cities: Moscow
- Participants: 34,000 people from 130 countries
- Follows: 5th World Festival of Youth and Students
- Precedes: 7th World Festival of Youth and Students

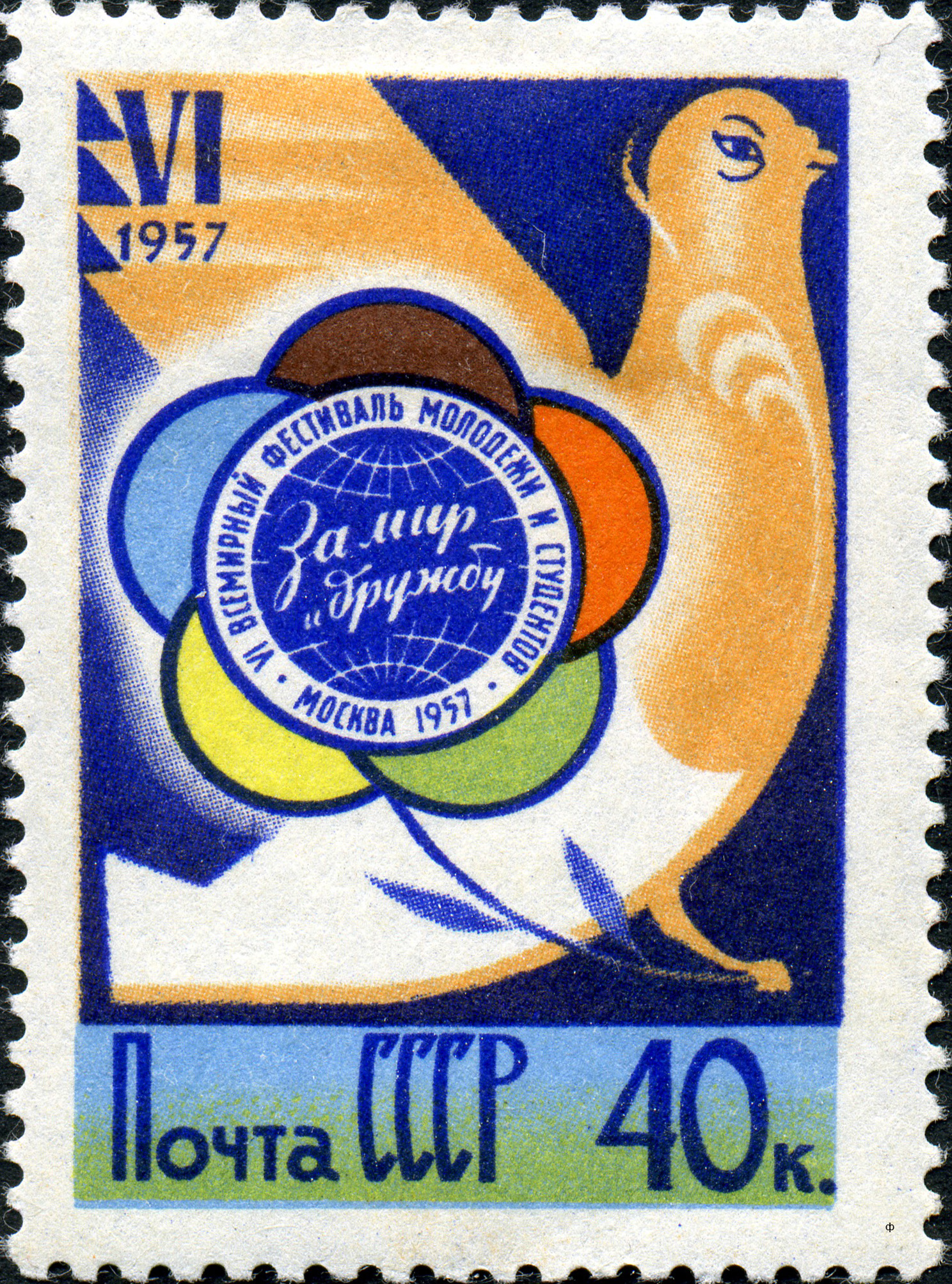
Soviet stamp marking the festival

The 6th World Festival of Youth and Students was held from 28 July to 5 August 1957 in Moscow, capital city of the then Union of Soviet Socialist Republics. The festival attracted 34,000 people from 130 countries. This became possible after the political changes initiated by Nikita Khrushchev. It was the first World Festival of Youth and Students held in the Soviet Union.

The Khrushchev reforms, known as Khrushchev Thaw, resulted in some changes in the Soviet Union. Foreigners could come for a visit, and people were allowed to meet foreigners, albeit only in groups under supervision. Soviet foreign language students acted as interpreters.

== Organisation and events ==
A minor international incident was provoked around the attendance of left-wing Iraqi writer Ga'ib Tu'ma Farman at the festival. The Iraqi government revoked Farman's citizenship while he was abroad, effectively stranding him in Moscow as a stateless person. This situation was resolved by the intervention of the Chinese delegation who agreed to officially invite Farman to Beijing. He went on to work for Foreign Languages Press.

Jazz musician Aleksei Kozlov had a chance to play with foreign musicians. The popular ensemble Druzhba from Leningrad became the winner of the First Prize in popular music, thanks to its lead singer, Edita Piekha, the star of the 1950s who could sing in many languages. Edita Piekha, Vladimir Troshin and international guests of the festival together performed the popular song Moscow Nights. Reverend Warren McKenna, Joanne Grant, Sally Belfrage, and folk singer Peggy Seeger attended the festival as part of the US delegation and later went on a propaganda trip to Communist China.

The festival's sports program featured an athletics competition.

After the festival there was a significant influx of Afro-Russians. The mixed race African descended children were called 'festival children' because of their appearance and timing of their birth.
