= Pyotr Abramovich Gannibal =

Russian military officer and nobleman (1742-1826)

Pyotr Abramovich Gannibal (July 21, 1742 - June 8, 1826) was a high-ranking Russian military leader and a nobleman of the Gannibal family; his father was general-in-chief Abram Petrovich Gannibal. Pyotr provided information regarding family history to his grand-nephew, the poet Alexander Pushkin for his unfinished novel, The Moor of Peter the Great which was based on the life of his father.

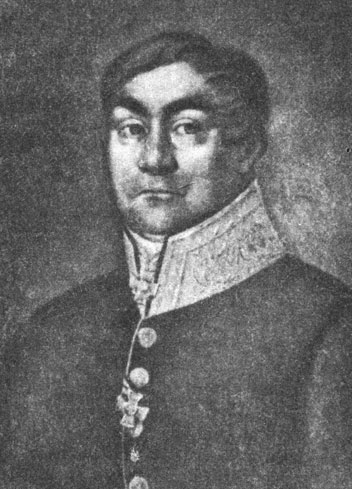
Pyotr Abramovich Gannibal (1742–1826)

== Biography ==
Pyotr was born on July 21, 1742, in Tallinn, Reval Governorate, Russian Empire (present-day Estonia) to Christine Regina and Abram Petrovich Gannibal; his godmother was the Empress Elizabeth.

Similar to his father, Pyotr entered the military at a young age, serving as a Colonel of artillery (1771) and a Major General (1776)

In the year 1777, Pyotr became married to Olga Grigorievna von Dannenstern (1759-1817), with whom he fathered three children, including the composer Benjamin Gannibal (1780-1839). In 1786, Pyotr left the family, acquired a large estate, and lived a quiet life until his eventual death on June 8, 1826, in Safontievo.

== See also ==
- Gannibal family
