= Hugh Barnes =

British journalist (born 1963)

Hugh Barnes (born 1963) is a British journalist and specialist on Russian matters. Born in London, he was educated at Oxford and Cambridge universities. He covered the wars in Kosovo and Afghanistan for various newspapers in the UK and abroad. He has also been the director of the democracy and conflict programme at the Foreign Policy Centre.

His publications include Special Effects (a novel), Understanding Iran (a report co-authored with Alex Bigham) and Gannibal: The Moor of Petersburg, a biography of Abram Gannibal, the African soldier-scholar at the tsar's court who was also the great-grandfather of Alexander Pushkin.

According to his Web site (undated) he is the managing editor of Oblomovism Ltd, an independent consultancy focusing on Russia and the CIS, Eastern Europe and Central Asia.
