= Festival children =

Cliché that appeared in the Soviet Union

Festival children (Russian: Дети фестиваля) was a household stereotype or cliché that appeared in the Soviet Union in the 1960s–1980s, referring to children born to Soviet people and people from non-Russian countries.

Specifically, this phraseologism designated children born in the Soviet Union from different ethnic groups or peoples, geographically distant across the world. It was believed that the first mass appearance of mestizos and mulattoes (mixed race) was caused by the 6th World Festival of Youth and Students, held in Moscow in 1957. Presumably, the expression was also influenced by the opening line of the festival anthem: "Children of different nations, we live with the dream of peace..." ("Anthem of the Democratic Youth of the World").

== Background ==
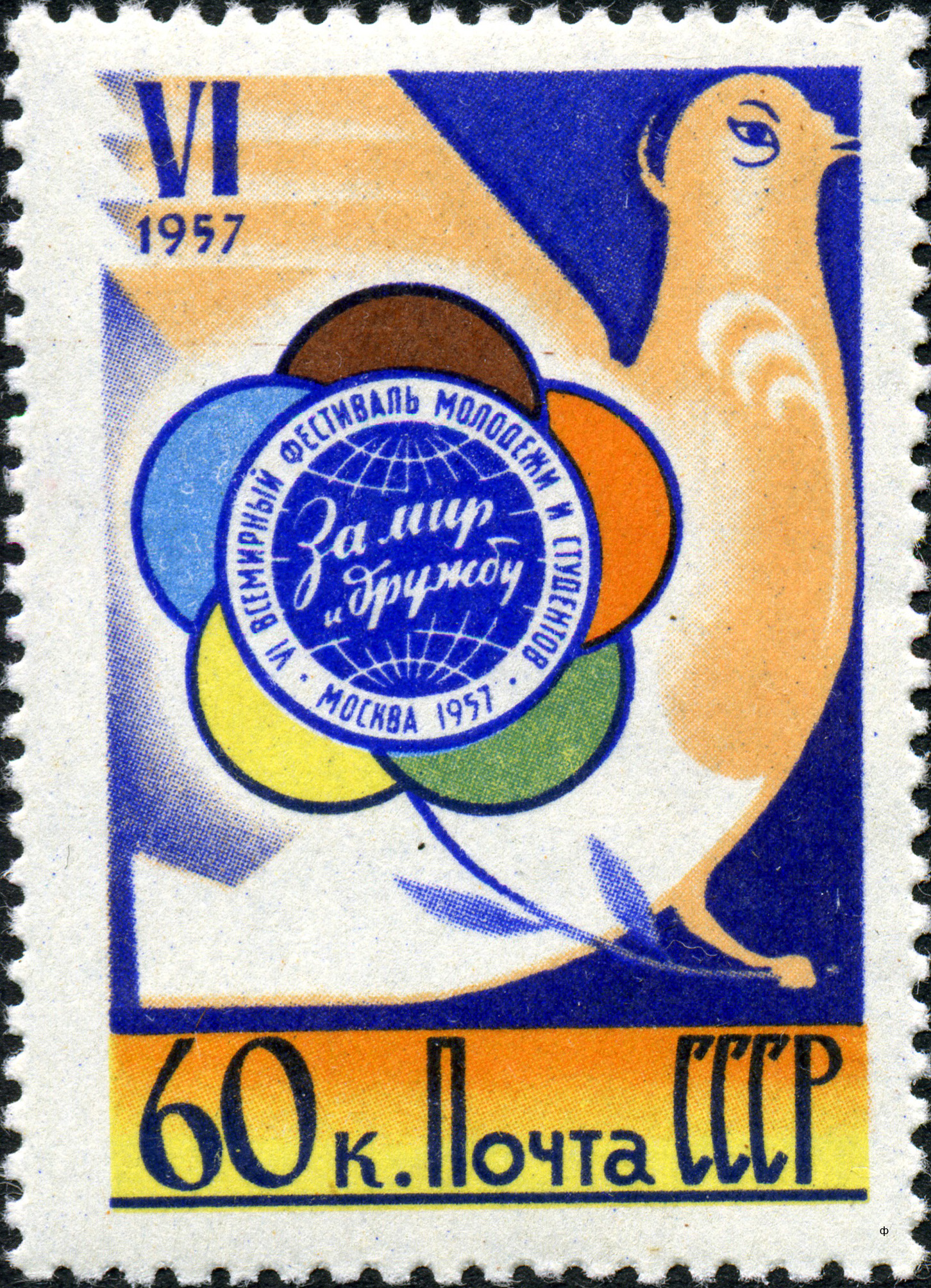
Postage stamp of the USSR with the festival emblem (1957)

Due to Russia's geographical remoteness, the migration of African peoples into Russia only occurred sporadically in pre modern times.

A relatively noticeable beginning of the appearance of black people in Russia could be considered the period of industrialization in the USSR in the 1930s, when some of the engineers, businessmen, and members of the intelligentsia who arrived from the United States were black. In certain numbers, they settled in the Soviet Union for years, and sometimes even started families and remained permanently (see, for example, James Lloydovich Patterson). At this stage, however, such cases remained rather isolated across the country and were not perceived by the native population as a particular phenomenon.

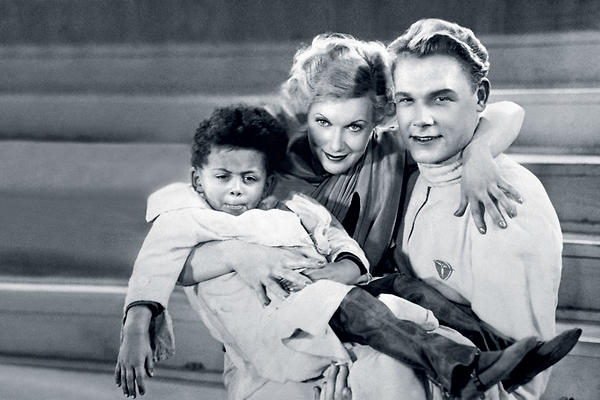
James Patterson, Lyubov Orlova, and Sergey Stolyarov. Frame from the film Circus (1936)

The World Festival of Youth and Students in 1957, therefore, caused a "new wave"—unlike previous ones, it was noticed by Soviet society. In an article about the Moscow festival, Artyom Krechetnikov, "BBC", noted:

The Khrushchev Thaw brought new principles: foreigners were divided into bad and good, and the latter were immeasurably more numerous; all workers were friends of the USSR; even if they were not yet ready to build socialism, they surely wanted peace throughout the world, and on that basis we would get along with them... Now everything Western was no longer rejected wholesale... A special term appeared: "people of goodwill." Not one hundred percent ours, but not enemies either. It was they who came to Moscow.

== The Festival ==
The symbol of the youth forum, which brought tens of thousands of delegates from leftist youth organizations from 131 countries of the world, was the Dove of Peace, created by Pablo Picasso. During the festival, fashion for jeans, sneakers, and the game of badminton spread rapidly. Popular musical super hits were Rock Around the Clock, the "Hymn of Democratic Youth," "‘If All the Boys on Earth..." and "Moscow Nights." The festival became, in every sense, a significant and explosive event for young men and women. The famous jazz musician Alexey Kozlov later wrote about those days:

Neither tourists nor businessmen had yet visited the country, and diplomats and the occasional journalist did not simply appear on the streets. Therefore, when we suddenly saw thousands of foreigners on the streets of Moscow with whom we could communicate, we were overcome with a kind of euphoria... I remember how, on bright nights, groups of people would stand on the pavement of Gorky Street, with a few people in the centre of each group discussing something heatedly. The rest, surrounding them in a tight circle, listened, gaining wisdom and getting used to the very process of freely exchanging opinions.

== Versions ==
Years of independence of African countries

Among the thousands of delegates, there were many representees from various African nations, which was in the midst of a decolonisation effort throughout much of the continent. A number of delegations represented not states, but national liberation movements, often operating underground in their home countries. The latter were given a particularly warm welcome. The Soviet press often reported in detail on the difficulties and dangers they had to overcome to get to Moscow. Writer Anatoly Makarov recounts:

From Manezhnaya Square, straight along the pavement, ignoring the honking of cars and the trills of the police, a crowd rose up, the likes of which had never been seen on the streets of Moscow. Colourful, dressed almost like carnival revellers, irreverent, cheerful, strumming guitars, beating drums, blowing pipes, shouting, singing, dancing on the move, intoxicated not by wine but by freedom and the purest and best feelings, unfamiliar, unknown, multilingual – and yet so familiar it made your blood run cold, so familiar it hurt... The festival travelled through Moscow in buses and open trucks (there weren't enough buses for all the guests). It floated along the Garden Ring, which was an endless sea of people. All of Moscow, simple, just coming to its senses after ration cards and queues... dressed up as best they could, barely beginning to emerge from basements and communal flats, stood on the pavement, sidewalks, and rooftops, reaching out to passing guests, longing for the touch of warm human hands. The geographical map took on a concrete form. The world really was amazingly diverse.

According to popular belief, later propagated by the press during perestroika and in Russia, the close emotional contact between young Muscovites and their foreign peers was not limited to conversations about peace and friendship, but sometimes went much further. Ordinary Soviet citizens had a lot of questions about dark-skinned people, including some that were not entirely appropriate. Yegor Telitsyn, who worked as a patrol Militsiya (policeman) during the festival, recalls:

A group of men were detained in the Leninsky Hills area. They were sitting behind some bushes in the middle of a lawn, with two young Africans in the centre. They were drunk and naked. When asked what was going on, one of the men explained that they had made a bet with their friends about the colour of their ‘equipment’. To settle the matter, they bought several bottles of vodka and persuaded (with gestures!) some delegates who were passing by to join them for a ‘picnic.’ When they were properly drunk, they managed to convince them to perform a striptease. We arrived just as the events were reaching their climax. The Africans were sent to a hotel, and our men to the nearest police station...

According to participants in the events, "There were a lot of foreigners whom no one in Russia had ever seen before. I mean, first and foremost, black people, but also people of other nationalities. Our girls went crazy,". Television critic Irina Petrovskaya writes in Izvestia about the festival days, saying that "love between Soviet Komsomol members and emissaries from all countries and continents flared up on its own, without asking anyone's permission". Alexei Kozlov published juicy details in his sensational memoir Kozel na sakse (The Goat on the Saxophone):

I myself was not involved in these events, but I heard many stories that were similar in their main details. And this is what happened. At night, when it got dark, crowds of girls from all over Moscow made their way to the places where foreign delegations were staying. These were various student dormitories and hotels located on the outskirts of the city... It was impossible for Soviet girls to break into the hotel buildings, as everything was cordoned off by professional security officers and amateur vigilantes. But no one could forbid foreign guests from leaving their hotels.

...Events unfolded at maximum speed. There was no courtship, no false coquetry. The newly formed couples quickly moved away from the buildings, into the darkness, into the fields, into the bushes, knowing exactly what they were going to do. They did not go very far, so the area around the hotels was quite crowded, with couples not too far from each other, but in the darkness it did not matter. The image of the mysterious, shy and chaste Russian Komsomol girl did not so much collapse as become enriched with a new, unexpected trait — reckless, desperate debauchery. Indeed, ‘still waters run deep...’

Special mobile motorised squads were urgently organised on trucks, equipped with lighting devices, scissors and barber clippers for cutting hair. When the trucks with the patrols, according to the raid plan, unexpectedly drove out into the fields and turned on all their headlights and lamps, the true scale of the ‘orgy’ taking place became apparent. There were a great many couples. Foreigners were left alone, only the girls were dealt with... part of their hair was cut off, leaving a ‘parting’, after which the girls had only one option — to shave their heads and grow their hair back... Rumours of what was happening spread instantly throughout Moscow. Some, who were particularly curious, went to the Tourist Hotel, Luzhniki and other places where the raids were taking place, just to gawk at the rather rare spectacle.

Nine months after the World Festival of Youth and Students in the spring of 1958, the ‘children of the festival’ began to appear. It was difficult for young mothers to hide the fruits of those fleeting relationships because of the black skin of their illegitimate children, and every outing turned into a visual demonstration of what had happened. Conservative public opinion was negative: a black baby in a pram was considered a sign of his mother's loose morals. Vladimir Kontrovsky, in his novel The Last Officer, gives such a derogatory description of one of his characters:

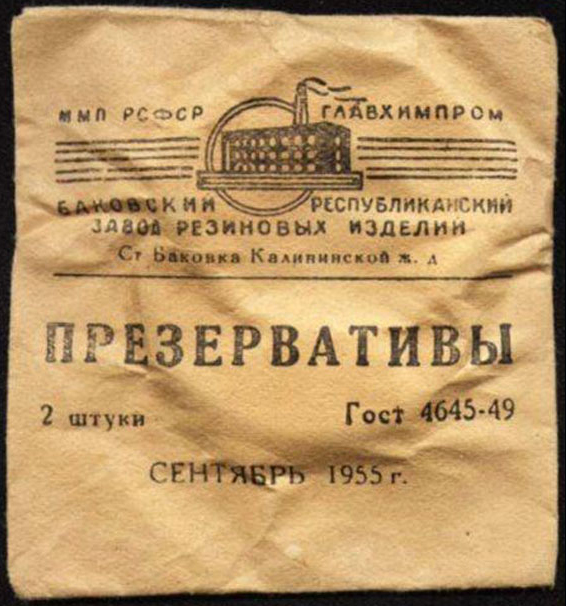
Soviet condoms (1955)

His grandmother, may she rest in peace, was one of the enthusiastic Komsomol members who, with open knees, welcomed guests to the Moscow International Festival of Youth and Students, who had arrived from countries in Asia and Africa that had only just been freed from the yoke of the accursed colonisers. International friendship knew no bounds, and when the wave of enthusiasm subsided, numerous ‘children of the festival’ remained on the sand, wet with girls' tears, like nimble crabs — contraceptives were in short supply in the Land of Soviets. Valery's grandmother was not spared this fate either: she gave birth to a dark-skinned son — the spitting image of his father. The independence fighter returned to his homeland without giving a thought to the consequences of his passionate but short-lived love affair in a distant northern country, and his offspring grew up.

== Statistics ==
Journalist A. Dobrovolsky mentions a summary statistical report allegedly prepared for the leadership of the USSR Ministry of Internal Affairs, which recorded the birth of a total of 531 mulatto children. The search for traces of children of non-European races from the festival, organised by the Trud newspaper in various relevant state, public and human rights structures (the Metis Foundation, the Institute of Ethnology and Anthropology, the Centre for Interethnic Cooperation, the Moscow House of Nationalities), yielded no results at all.

The festival took place from 28 July to 11 August 1957. A total of 34,000 foreigners arrived in Moscow. The most numerous were delegates from European countries; in particular, two thousand people came from the predominantly white countries of France and Finland.

Natalya Krylova, Doctor of Historical Sciences and Chief Research Fellow at the Institute of African Studies of the Russian Academy of Sciences, notes that there were about 5,000–6,000 dark-skinned guests of both sexes at the festival — and they were not left to their own devices; over 800 events were held with their active participation as part of the festival programme over two weeks. So even if we assume mutual hypersexuality on both sides, it would have been impossible to have a significant number of sexual encounters in the time available, and the results could be counted in the dozens. Moreover, there were strong cultural differences between Soviet and foreign youth, to which racial differences were added in this case.

According to the newspaper Inostranets, even in today's Russia, the number of children born to interethnic couples with foreigners reaches only 7–9 thousand per year per country, and the average 30-year-old Russian man has, on average, fewer than 0.001 foreign female sexual partners out of his total number of sexual partners (about ten before reaching this age) has less than 0.001 foreign women, while his American counterpart has 0.2 foreign women out of the same ten sexual partners, and a Frenchman has 0.5 out of 15. In other words, there was no question of ‘crowds’ thirsting for ‘exotic’ sex in 1957: the barriers between civilisations were too high. Society thus protects its members from interethnic contact not out of racism as such, but because of the great cultural differences that significantly reduce the chances of a potential couple having a happy marriage.

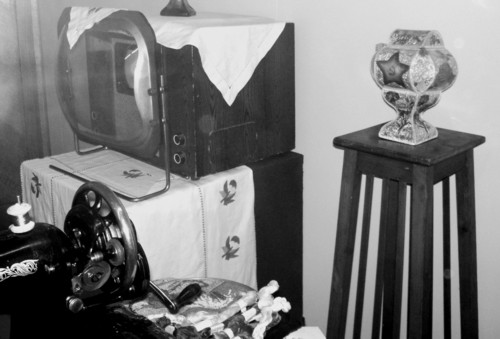
Interior of a Soviet apartment from the 1950s

The future Nobel Prize winner Gabriel García Márquez, in 1957 a Colombian journalist unknown to anyone, testifies in his memoirs about everyday life and holidays in Moscow during the festival:

Our Soviet comrades wanted to be friends, but the Muscovites were suspiciously stubborn in their resistance when we expressed a desire to visit them. Only a few people gave in to our insistence.

Marquez, however, attributed this to their embarrassment at the poor state of their housing conditions. However, this does not quite fit with the recollections of Makarov, who was ‘on the other side of the barricades’:

We took our French friends to visit our classmate in his huge Moscow communal flat, which had been converted from former hotel rooms. Somehow, the entire old courtyard learned that young Parisians were being welcomed in the flat on the second floor, and people flocked to us with pies, varenye, and, of course, bottles and other gifts from the simple Russian heart. The French women were crying loudly. Incidentally, all this was happening on Pushkin Street, a hundred metres from the famous building, which Muscovites passed by in those years, reflexively lowering their eyes and quickening their pace.

Some light on the reason for the emergence of various legends is shed by data from the internal affairs and state security agencies, shared by Vladlen Krivosheev, then an instructor in the organisational department of the Moscow City Committee of the Komsomol. On the eve of the festival, a meeting of ‘thieves-in-law’ was held, which decided to completely shut down criminal activity in Moscow during those days and to ensure appropriate control over unorganised criminal elements. The reason was simple: the event was political, so in case of any incidents, they would have to answer not under criminal articles of the Criminal Code, but ‘with politics’ on top of that. Before the festival, real prostitutes began to flock to Moscow from all over the Union. The authorities feared an outbreak of sexually transmitted diseases. Therefore, several particularly well-known professionals were taken out of the city by the police, their hairstyles were ruined, and they were told to warn the rest. This had the desired effect: no cases of organised commercial sex were recorded during the two weeks of the festival. Natalya Krylova says:

Girls with pigtails in the fashion of the time, white socks, brought up on Gaidar's books, simply could not provoke a sexual pandemic. At that time, romantic infantilism reigned supreme, not the need to copulate. We were just crawling out from under the ideological cap. It was like contact with an extraterrestrial civilisation. But no one is going to immediately engage in intimate relations with little green men.

The legend of the frivolity and carefreeness of foreign fathers is also unfounded: a major post-festival problem for the Ministry of Internal Affairs and the KGB was the members of foreign delegations who remained in Moscow under various pretexts. They were all tracked down and quietly expelled from the country on an individual basis.

== Phenomenon ==
=== Reasons for occurrence ===
The Cold War in the 1980

In the late 1940s and early 1950s, when the USSR-led ‘Second World’ (socialist countries) was at the peak of its external expansion, the leadership of the Central Committee of the Communist Party of the Soviet Union realised and adopted a number of decisions on organising the process of mass training of personnel for countries in Asia, Africa and Latin America – both by organising training for Soviet specialists (which required a significant number of native speakers of the relevant languages) and by attracting students from these countries to Moscow and other cities of the USSR with the aim of providing appropriate, forward-looking training for current and future local pro-Soviet managerial, military and business elites.

As a result, the Institute of International Relations (IMO, now MGIMO) was established in 1944; a year before the festival, in 1956, the Faculty of Oriental Languages was created at Moscow State University, which evolved into the Institute of Asian and African Countries (IAA), and three years after the festival, in 1960, the University of Friendship of Peoples, now RUDN, was opened. The admission of students and recruitment of teachers, initially carried out through public organisations, was then separated into a distinct and important task for the embassies and consulates of the USSR in the respective countries.

All this naturally led to a sharp increase in Moscow in the late 1950s and early 1960s in the number of foreigners from Asia, Africa and Latin America. The Patrice Lumumba University alone produced about 300–350 specialists annually during those years — that is, during five years of study at this one university in Moscow alone, about 1,500 representatives of non-European races permanently resided there. These figures, however, are lower than those cited by Evgeny Zhirnov in the journal Vlast:

In the second half of the 1950s, the number of foreign students in the USSR increased sharply. The first representatives of developing countries began to appear in Soviet universities [...]. From the early 1960s, the Soviet leadership moved from the artificial production of friends of the Soviet Union abroad to mass production... Formally, they were provided with scholarships for study by Soviet public organisations – from trade unions to societies for friendship with foreign countries. And with the opening of the Patrice Lumumba Peoples' Friendship University of Russia (RUDN) in 1960, each of the developing countries was given a quota for accepting students... In 1970, the majority of foreign students were citizens of socialist countries — 4,301 people. 1,057 students came from Asia, 1,414 from Africa, and 347 from Latin America.

It is evident that they, along with the staff of other institutions focused on relations with the ‘third’ and the ‘Fourth World’ of Soviet universities, contributed to the emergence of the festival's children to a much greater extent than the two-week festival itself in 1957, which inspired Muscovites to come up with a harmless euphemism to describe the real phenomenon. However, REN-TV commentator Sergei Karamaev concludes:

The vast majority of the population of the Soviet Union knew about Africa only from Chukovsky's poems — Africans, in turn, knew just as much about the USSR... Another problem arose — since the number of African male students was much greater than that of female students, Africans very quickly turned their attention to Russian girls. The ladies themselves probably enjoyed this, but the male population of Russia took it, to put it mildly, with hostility.

And so it began. According to the Africans themselves, the Russians treated them extremely rudely — pushing them around on the streets and calling them ‘black monkeys,’ but most often the Africans heard ‘go back on your palm trees.’ In 1963, the very liberal Daily News of Natal wrote: "Tensions in relations between African students and Russians are beginning to manifest themselves in earnest. Africans who go to the United States secretly expect to be beaten up on the streets there, but instead it turns out that they are not even insulted there. At the same time, they come to Moscow, believing that they will be welcomed there as heroes and fighters for national liberation — and instead of laurel wreaths, they encounter hostility". (Note: It is worth noting that the promotion of education in the Soviet Union inevitably provoked countermeasures in the ‘third world’ from social strata and elites that were not interested in it. The South African Daily News is not a neutral source in this regard.)

By the mid-1960s, the leadership of the socialist countries had ceased to harbour any illusions about Africans and the ‘liberated’ countries of Africa... Simply put, the socialist countries faced a dilemma: they extended a hand of friendship to Africa, but when Africa came close to them, they suddenly realised that they did not like Africans.

== Other terms ==
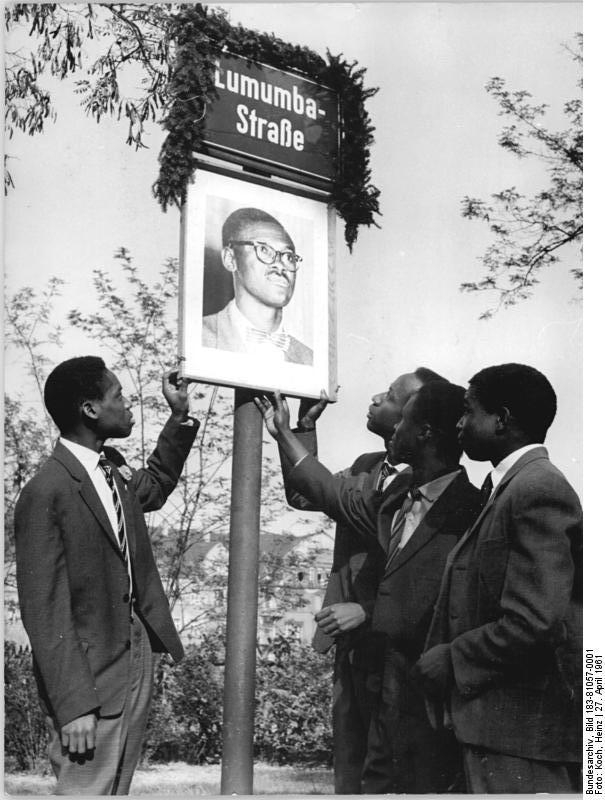
‘Lumumba's Children’ (Leipzig, Lumumba Street, 1961)

The metaphor ‘children of the festival’ was a tolerant and, at the same time, moderately ironic term for Soviet mulattoes and served as the main term for them until the 2000s. However, public opinion occasionally generated additional terms that were more topical. Specialised dictionaries and press publications mention the following among them:

- ‘Children of Patrice Lumumba’ (Note: ‘The Children of Patrice Lumumba’ is the name of a KVN team from the Peoples' Friendship University of Russia. It played on a well-known phrase and emphasised a racist theme.) or ‘children of Lumumba’ (from the name of the Patrice Lumumba University of Friendship of Peoples)
- ‘children of the Olympics’ (from the 1980 Summer Olympics held in Moscow).

In addition, after the XII World Festival of Youth and Students was held in the capital in 1985, the established phrase ‘children of the festival’ often began to be applied to the periods after both festivals, 1957 and 1985 (sometimes modified to ‘children of the festivals’).

But none of the terms described above was able to replace the original one until the turn of the 1990s and 2000s, when the concept of ‘Afro-Russians’ emerged, created by analogy with ‘African Americans,’ which was more successful due to the absence of chronological and circumstantial references, as well as thanks to active promotion in the media by Russian mulattoes themselves. In 2002, TV presenter Elena Khanga claimed authorship of the term.

In 2019 a number of media outlets and bloggers introduced the term ‘children of the World Cup’, comparing the situation with the birth of mixed-race children after festivals and the Olympics with a similar situation after the 2018 World Cup, which took place in Russia.

== Reflection in culture ==
The character of Russian-mulatto actor Grigory Siyatvinda in the Paragraph 78 duology bears the nickname Festival.

== See also ==
- Afro-Russians
- Afro-Abkhazians
- Stilyagi
- Khrushchev Thaw
- 6th World Festival of Youth and Students
- Third World and Least developed countries
- Peoples' Friendship University of Russia
- War children

== Literature ==
- Африка в воспоминаниях ветеранов дипломатической службы. 5(12) / Institute for African Studies, Russian Academy of Sciences; Council of Veterans of the Ministry of Foreign Affairs of the Russian Federation. — Moscow, 2004. — 306 pp. — ISBN 978-5-201-04926-3
- Африканистика молодых. Материалы первой всероссийской научной конференции «Школа молодого африканиста» (Moscow, 25–27 November 2001). — Moscow, 2004. — 189 pp. — ISBN 978-5-201-04930-0
- Krylova, N.; Prozhegina, S. Метисы: кто они? Проблемы социализации и самоидентификации. — Moscow: PML Institute for African Studies RAS, 2004. — 275 pp.
- Страны Африки и Россия (Справочник). — Moscow, 2004. — 280 pp.
- Африка во внешнеполитических приоритетах России. / Ed. by T. L. Deych. — Moscow, 2003. — 127 pp. — ISBN 978-5-201-04867-9
- Vasilyev, A. Африка — падчерица глобализации. — Moscow: Vostochnaya literatura, 2003. — 263 pp. — ISBN 978-5-02-018355-1
- Sinitsyn, S. На заре африканской независимости (Из воспоминаний дипломата). — Moscow, 2003. — 171 pp. — ISBN 978-5-201-04910-2
- Становление отечественной африканистики, 1920–е — начало 1960–х. / Ed. by A. B. Davidson. — Moscow, 2003. — 391 pp. — ISBN 978-5-02-008900-6
- Orlov, I.; Bagdasaryan, V.; Fedulin, A.; Mazin, K.; Schneidgen, J. Советское зазеркалье. Иностранный туризм в СССР в 1930—1980–е годы: Учебное пособие. — Moscow: Forum, 2007. — 256 pp. — ISBN 978-5-91134-149-7
- Smolyanitsky, M. Дети Фестивалей // Антология современного рассказа, или Истории конца века. — Moscow: Olimp, AST, 2000. — pp. 109–139. — ISBN 978-5-271-00373-8 (Astrel), ISBN 978-5-8195-0110-8 (Olimp)
- Makarov, A. Дети фестиваля — *Izvestia*, 10 July 2007
