= Karjaküla =

Borough in Estonia

- Small borough
- Location in Estonia
- Coordinates: 59°20′21″N 24°23′34″E
- Country: Estonia
- County: Harju County
- Municipality: Lääne-Harju Parish

Population (01.01.2004)
  - Total: 387

Karjaküla (German: Hohenhof) is a small borough (Estonian: alevik) in Lääne-Harju Parish, Harju County, northern Estonia. It has a population of 387 (as of 1 January 2004).

Russian military leader Ivan Gannibal (1735–1801) was born in Karjaküla Manor.
