= The Moor of Peter the Great =

Unfinished historical novel by Alexander Pushkin

- Author: Alexander Pushkin
- Original title: Арап Петра Великого
- Language: Russian
- Genre: Historical novel
- Publication date: 1837
- Publication place: Russian Empire
- English publication date: 1875
- Media type: Print

The Moor of Peter the Great (Russian: Арап Петра Великого, romanized: Arap Petra Velikogo, also translated as The Blackamoor of Peter the Great or The Negro of Peter the Great) is an unfinished historical novel by Alexander Pushkin. Written in 1827–1828 and first published in 1837, the novel is the first prose work of the great Russian poet.

== Background ==
Pushkin started to work on the novel towards the end of July 1827 in Mikhailovskoye and in spring 1828 read some drafts to his friends, including poet Pyotr Vyazemsky. During Pushkin's lifetime, two fragments were published: in the literary almanac Severnye Tsvety (1829) and in the newspaper Literaturnaya Gazeta (March 1830). All the extant parts were first published after Pushkin's death by the editors of the journal Sovremennik in 1837, who also gave the novel its current title.

The main character of the novel, Ibrahim, is loosely based on Pushkin's maternal great-grandfather, Abram Petrovich Gannibal, a black African who was brought to Russia during the reign of Peter the Great. Pushkin's great-uncle, Pyotr Abramovich Gannibal helped to inform Pushkin on the life of his great-grandfather. Pushkin's interests in history and genealogy combined to depict the transformation of Russia at the beginning of 18th century; the period of Russian history to which Pushkin returns in the narrative poem Poltava in 1829. The influential Russian literary critic Vissarion Belinsky maintained that "had this novel been completed... we should have a supreme Russian historical novel, depicting the manners and customs of the greatest epoch of Russian history."

== Plot summary ==
The novel opens with a picture of the morals and manners of French society during the first quarter of the 18th century; with the Moor's life in Paris, his success in French society, and his love affair with a French countess. But "summoned both by Peter and by his own vague sense of duty" Ibrahim returns to Russia. The following chapters, full of historical color and antiquarianism, sketch the different strata of Russian society: ball at the Winter Palace and boyars' dinner at the boyar Gavrila Rzhevsky's place. The latter is interrupted by the arrival of the Tsar, who wants to marry Ibrahim to the Gavrila's daughter, Natalia.

== Adaptations ==
- 1961 – The Blackamoor of Peter the Great, opera, by Arthur Lourie
- 1976 – How Czar Peter the Great Married Off His Moor, film, USSR, directed by Alexander Mitta, starring Vladimir Vysotsky.

== Translation history ==
- 1875 – The Moor of Peter the Great (translated by Mrs. J. Buchan Telfer) in Russian Romance, London: H. S. King.
- 1892 – Peter the Great’s Negro (transl. by Mrs. Sutherland Edwards) in The Queen of Spades and Other Stories, London: Chapman & Hall.
- 1896 – Peter the Great’s Negro (translated by T. Keane) in The Prose Tales of A. Pushkin, London: G. Bell and Sons.
- 1933 – Peter the Great’s Negro (transl. by Natalie Duddington) in The Captain’s Daughter and Other Tales, London: J. M. Dent & Sons, (Everyman's Library).
- 1960 – The Negro of Peter the Great (transl. by Rosemary Edmonds) in The Queen of Spades and Other Stories, London: Penguin, (Penguin Classics).
- 1962 – The Negro of Peter the Great (transl. by Gillon Aitken) in The Captain's daughter and other stories, London: The New English Library Limited.
- 1966 – Peter the Great's Blackamoor (transl. by Gillon R. Aitken) in The Complete Prose Tales of Alexandr Sergeyevitch Pushkin, London: Barrie & Rockliff.
- 1983 – The Blackamoor of Peter the Great (translated by Paul Debreczeny) in Complete Prose Fiction, Stanford: Stanford U.P.
- 1999 – Peter the Great's Blackamoor (transl. by Alan Myers) in The Queen of Spades and Other Stories, Oxford: Oxford U.P., (Oxford World Classics).
- 2016 – The Moor of Peter the Great (transl. by Richard Pevear and Larissa Volokhonsky) in Novels, Tales, Journeys: The Complete Prose of Alexander Pushkin, New York: Alfred A. Knopf.
- 2021 – Peter the Great's African : experiments in prose (transl. by Robert Chandler & Elizabeth Chandler and Boris Dralyuk) in Peter the Great's African : experiments in prose, New York, New York Review Books

== Sources ==
- Debreczeny, Paul. “The Blackamoor of Peter the Great: Pushkin’s Experiment with a Detached Mode of Narration.” Slavic and East European Journal. 18.2 (1974): 119–31.
- Nicholas V. Riasanovsky. The Image of Peter the Great in Russian History and Thought. Oxford, Oxford UP, 1992.
