= Arthur Lourié =

Russian-born American composer (1892–1966)

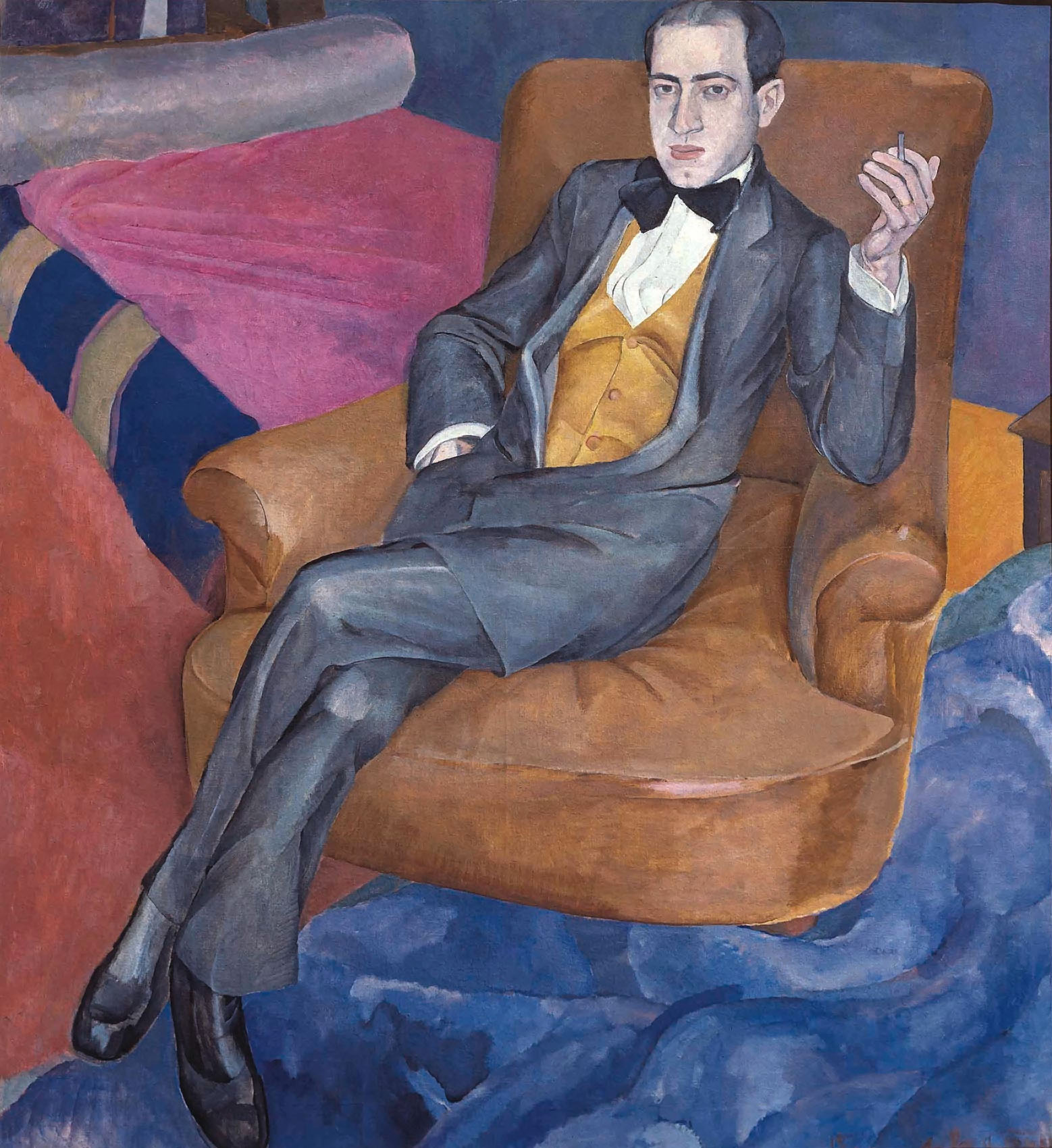
Portrait by Lev Bruni, 1915

Artur Sergeyevich Lurye (Russian: Артур Серге́евич Лурье; born Naum Izrailevich Lurya; Russian: Наум Израилевич Лурья; 14 May 1892 – 12 October 1966), better known as Arthur-Vincent Lourié, was a Russian composer, writer, administrator, and musical agent. Lourié played an important role in the earliest stages of the organization of Soviet music after the 1917 Revolution but later went into exile. His music reflects his close connections with contemporary writers and artists, and also his close relationship with Igor Stravinsky.

== Russian career ==
Born into a prosperous Jewish family in Propoysk, he converted to Catholicism while still in Russia. An admirer of van Gogh, from whom he derived the name 'Vincent', Lourié was partly self-taught, but also studied piano with Maria Barinova and composition with Glazunov at the Saint Petersburg Conservatory, graduating in 1913. He became friendly with the Futurist poets and particularly Anna Akhmatova, whose poetry he was among the first to set. He was also acquainted with Vladimir Mayakovsky, Nikolai Kulbin, Fyodor Sologub and Alexander Blok; and was deeply influenced by contemporary art. His early piano pieces, from 1908 onward, take on from the late works of Scriabin but evolve new kinds of discourse, arriving in 1914 at an early form of dodecaphony (the Synthèses) and in 1915 at the Formes en l'air, dedicated to Picasso, a rather Cubist conception using an innovative form of notation in which different systems are placed spatially on the page in independent blocks, with blanks instead of bars' rest. At this stage of his career, he seems a parallel figure to Nikolai Roslavets, though Lourié's aesthetic appears more 'decadent'. Essentially, he was the first Russian Futurist in music, and in 1914 was the co-signatory, with the painter Georgy Yakulov and the poet Benedikt Livshits, of the Petersburg Futurist Manifesto, 'We and the West', proclaiming principles common to all three arts.

== Revolutionary Russia ==
After the October Revolution of 1917, Lourié served under Anatoly Lunacharsky as head of the music division (Muzo) of the Commissariat of Popular Enlightenment (Narkompros). Lourié held this position until January 1921. Then he took up the position of teacher. For a while, he shared a house with Serge Sudeikin and his wife Vera Sudeikina. His tenure proved to be contentious. When he suggested renaming his music department "The People's Tribune for Civil Music", and styling himself the "People's Tribune", Lunacharsky allegedly replied: "No, Artur Sergeevich, this does not suit us." Aleksandr Goldenweiser and Mikhail Ippolitov-Ivanov complained to Lenin himself about him. Though his sympathies were Leftist, he became increasingly disenchanted with the Bolshevik order in Russia.

== Into exile ==
In 1921 he went on an official visit to Berlin, where he befriended Ferruccio Busoni, and from which he failed to return. His works were thereafter proscribed in the USSR. In 1922 he settled in Paris, where he became friends with the philosopher Jacques Maritain and was introduced to Igor Stravinsky by Vera Sudeykina. Maritain championed his work early on, viewing the young Lourié not only as an important composer, but as a composer with an important capacity to express Catholic theology and philosophy in music. Lourié dedicated a number of his works to Maritain, including the Gigue from 4 Pièces Pour Piano (1928). From 1924 to 1931, he was one of Stravinsky's most important champions, often becoming part of the Stravinsky household as he wrote articles about his fellow composer and made piano reductions of his works. He and the Stravinskys eventually parted company over a feud with Vera, and Stravinsky seldom afterwards mentioned his existence. In his works of the Paris years Lourié's early radicalism turns to an astringent form of neoclassicism and Russophile nostalgia; a dialogue with Stravinsky's works of the same period is evident, even to the extent that Stravinsky may have taken ideas from the younger composer: Lourié's A Little Chamber Music (1924) seems to prophesy Stravinsky's Apollon musagète (1927), his Concerto spirituale for chorus, piano and orchestra (1929) the latter's Symphony of Psalms (1930). Certainly, in his later works, Stravinsky adopted Lourié's style of notation with blank space instead of empty bars. Lourié also composed two symphonies (No. 1 subtitled Sinfonia dialectica) and an opera, The Feast in a Time of Plague. A man of very wide culture, who cultivated the image of a dandy and aesthete, he set poems of Sappho, Pushkin, Heine, Verlaine, Blok, Mayakovsky, Dante, classical Latin and medieval French poets. He was also a talented painter.

== American years ==
When the Germans occupied Paris in 1940, Lourié, with assistance from Serge Koussevitzky, emigrated to the United States. He settled in New York. In 1946, he became an American citizen and joined the staff of Voice of America's Russian division. He was recorded in the 1950 United States census as living in Manhattan with Elizabeth.

He wrote some film scores but gained almost no performances for his more serious works, though he continued to compose. He spent over ten years writing an opera after Pushkin's The Moor of Peter the Great called The Blackamoor of Peter the Great, so far unperformed, though an orchestral suite has been recorded. He also composed a setting of sections from T. S. Eliot's Little Gidding for tenor and instruments (1959).

Lourié died in Princeton, New Jersey.

== Works ==
This list is based on that of the Arthur Lourié Society.

Works composed by Arthur Lourié
Title	Year	Medium
Délie/Madrigal funèbre		Voice, piano
5 Préludes fragiles, Op. 1	1908–1910	Piano
2 Estampes, Op. 2	1910	Piano
Intermède enfantine, Op. 3	1910–1911	Piano
3 Études, Op. 4	1910–1911	Piano
Mazurkas, Op. 7	1911–1912	Piano
Doroenka/Fusspfad	1912	Voice, piano
Verlaine	1912–1919	Voice, piano
Prélude, Op. 12/2	1912	Quarter-tone keyboard
2 Poèmes, Op. 8	1912	Piano
Salomé-Liturgie, Op. 11 bis	1912–1913	Piano
2 Poèmes, Op. 5	1912	Voice, piano
4 Poèmes, Op. 10	1912–1913	Piano
Spleen empoisonnée	1913	
Masques (Tentations), Op. 13	1913	Piano
Menuet	1914	Piano
Chetki (Rosary)	1914	High voice, piano
Quasi Valse	1914	Voice, piano
Grecheskie Pesni	1914	Voice, piano
Synthèse, Op. 16	1914	Piano
String Quartet No. 1	1915	2 violins, viola, cello
Corona Carminum Sacrorum (Ave Maria, Salve Regina, Inviolata)	1915–1917	Voice, piano
Suite japonais	1915	Soprano, piano
Triolety/Triolets	1915	Voice, piano
Pleurs de la Vierge, Op. 26	1915	Voice, violin, viola, cello
5 Rondeaux de Christine de Pisan	1915	Women‘ voices, harp, cembalo or piano
Formes en l'air	1915	Piano
Dvevnoi uzor (Order of the Day)	1915	Piano
Rodestvo Bogorodicy/Naissance de la Vierge (Birth of the Virgin)	1915	Voice, piano
Tri svetlych tsaria (The Three Kings)	1916	Voice, piano
Pastorale de la Volga	1916	Oboe, bassoon, 2 violas and cello
Oshibka baryshni smerti (Death's Mistake), Op. 40	1917	Piano
3rd Sonatina, Tret'ia sonatina dlia roialia	1917	Piano
Rondel de Stéphane de Mallarmé	1917	Voice, piano
Upmann/Smoking Sketch, Kuritel'naia shutka	1917	Piano
Azbuka/Dve pesenki dlia detei (text by Leo Tolstoy)	1917	Voice, piano
Roial'v detskoi/Piano Gosse/Klavier im Kinderzimmer	1917	Piano
Nash Marsh (Our March)	1918	Piano und speaker
Bolotnyi popik/Das Sumpfäffchen	1919	Voice, piano
Golos Muzy/Voix de la Muse/Voice of the muse	1919	Women's chorus
V kumirniu zolotogo sna (In the Temple of Golden Dreams)	1919	Chorus a capella
Chetyre Narodnye Pesni Ninei Bretany/4 Chants populaires de Basse Bretagne	1920	Voice, piano
Uzkaia lira/die schmale Leier/La Lyre étroite	1920–1941	Voice, piano
Elisium/Vosem' stichtvoreniia Pushkina	1920–1921	Voice, piano
Shagi Komandora/The Commander's Stride	1920	Voice, piano
Lament from Dante's Vita Nouva	1921	Women's chorus, strings
Canzone de la Vita Nuova de Dante	1921	Women's chorus a cappella
Pesni o Rossii: Korshun	1921	Chorus
Dvě kolybelnyia/2 Berceuses	1921	Voice, piano
Prochitanie/Chant des Gueuses/The Beggar Woman	1922	Soprano, contralto, English horn
Chant funèbre sur la mort d'un poète/Pogrebal'nyi plach na smert' poeta/Funeral Song on the Death of a Poet	1922	Chorus
String Quartet No. 2 'A little Chamber Music'	1923–1924	2 violins, viola, cello
Nos (The Nose)	1923	Opera
String Quartet No. 3 'Suite'	1924–1926	2 violins, viola, cello
Toccata	1924	Piano
Regina Coeli	1924	Contralto, trumpet, oboe
Sonata	1924	Violin, double bass
Capriccio sur un thème de J. S. Bach / For pipe smokers	1924	Voice, piano
2 chants	1926	Voice, piano
Sonnet de Dante	1926	Voice, 2 violins, viola, cello
Valse	1926	Piano
Petite suite en fa	1926	Piano
Obriadovaia / Svadebni Prichet (poslě Bani)	1926	Voice, piano
Improperium (pour l'office du Dimanche des Rameaux)	1926	2 violins, baryton, double bass
Marche	1927	Piano
Sonnet de Dante	1927	Voice, piano
Gigue	1927	Piano
Intermezzo	1928	Piano
Nocturne	1928	Piano
Sonate liturgique	1928	Chorus, piano und chamber ensemble
Deuxième Tzigane (Sérénade)	1928	Voice, piano
Concerto Spirituale	1928–1929	Piano, 3 choruses, brass, 10 double basses, timbales and organ
Divertissement	1929	Violin, viola
Le Festin durant la Peste/Das Festmahl während der Pest/Pir vo vremia chumy (ballet in 2 acts)	1929–1931	Orchestra, chamber chorus and 2 soloists
Sinfonia Dialectica: Anno Domini MCMXXX/Symphonie 1930	1930	Orchester
Procession	1934	2 women's voices, piano
Tu es Petrus (Motet)	1935	Chorus a capella
Berceuse de la chevrette	1936	Piano
Naissance de la Beauté	1936	6 sopranos, piano (or cembalo), clarinet, bassoon, crotales
Symphony No. 2 'Kormtchaïa'	1936–1939	Orchestra
La Flûte à travers le Violon	1935	Flute, violin
Allegretto	1936	Flute, violin
Dithyrambes	1938	Flute
A Christo crucificado ante el mar	1938	Baritone, mezzo-soprano, piano
Phoenix Park Nocturne	1938	Piano
Symphony No. 2 'Kormtchaïa' (in 10 movements)	1939	Orchestra
A Hamlet Sonata	1941–1944	2 violins, viola, cello
2 Poems	1941	Voice, oboe, Klarinette (in A), bassoon and strings
Toskà - Vospominaniia (Memories of the Past)	1941	Voice, harp (or piano)
De Ordinatio Angelorum	1942	Chorus, 2 trumpets, 2 trombones, tuba
2 Études sur un sonnet de Mallarmé	1945–1962	Voice, flute, piano
Little Gidding	1945	Tenor, flute, oboe, clarinet in A, basson, piano, cymbals, and strings
Concerto da camera	1946–1947	Violin solo, string orchestra
Paysage de sons	1948–1958	Voice, piano
Ave atque vale/Drei Dionysos-Dithyramben (Die Sonne sinkt) (text by Friedrich Nietzsche)	1948	Voice, piano
Epilogue	1948	2 violins, viola, cello, double bass
Arap Petra Velikogo/Der Mohr Peter des Grossen (opera)	1949–1961	
Anathema/Motette	1951	Tenor, baritone, bass, men's chorus, 2 oboes, 2 bassoons, 2 trumpets, 2 trombones
Postcommunion	1952	5 women's voice a cappella
The Mime	1956	Clarinet
Sunrise	1956	Flute
The Flute of Pan	1957	Flute
Iva/Die Weide	1958	Voice, piano
Ernste Stunde	1958	Voice, piano
Zaklinaniia/Beschwörungen 1-4	1959	Voice, piano
Ten' (Schatten)/Madrigal	1962	Voice, piano
Sibylla dicit (cantata)	1964	Women's voices, 4 instruments, cymbals
Funeral Games in Honor of Chronos	1964	3 flutes, piano, crotales

== Selected recordings ==
- Arthur Lourié Songs & Choruses: The Rosary, Voice of the Muse, on poems of Anna Akhmatova. Cantata In the Sanctuary of a Golden Dream on collected texts of Alexander Blok, Natalia Gerassimova, Vladimir Skanavy et al., rec. 1994, reissued by Brilliant Classics (2010)
- Futurpiano: Synthèses (Op. 16), Formes en l'air (for Pablo Picasso). Daniele Lombardi, piano. Rec. 1995. Issued by LTM (2009)
- 12 Greek Songs to Texts from Sappho, translated by Viacheslav Ivanov (1914) on: Viacheslav Ivanov in Music of Miaskovsky, Lourié, Shebalin, Gretchaninov Ludmila Shkirtil (mezzo-soprano), Northern Flowers (2010)
- Solo Piano Works, plus Der Irrtum der Frau Tod/Death's Mistake for speaker and piano; 3-CD set, Moritz Ernst (piano), Oskar Ansull (speaker), Capriccio (2016)
- Complete Piano Works, Giorgio Koukl (piano), Naxos ( 2016)
