= Abram Petrovich Gannibal =

African-born Russian general and military engineer

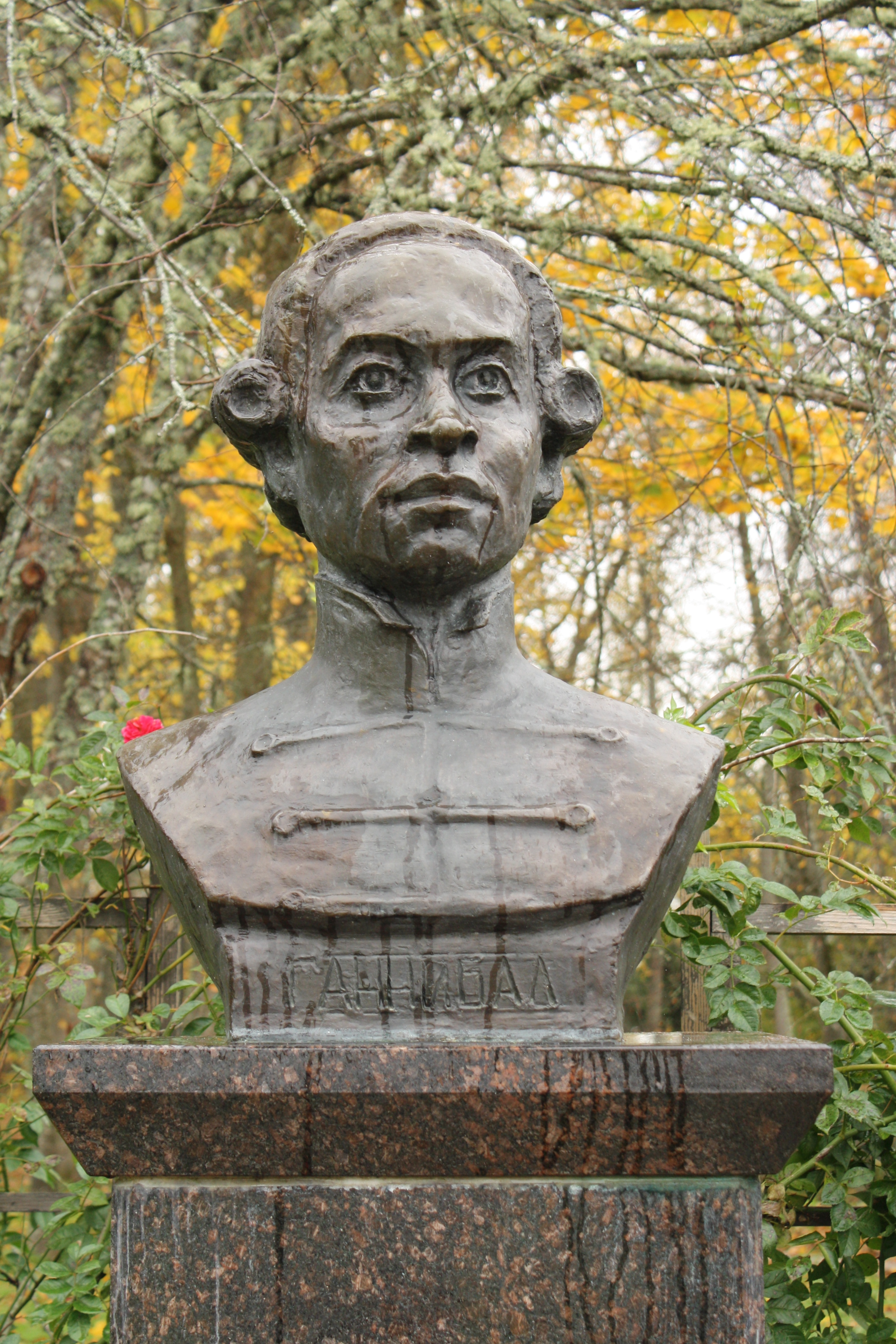
- Modern depiction of Abram Gannibal, bust in Petrovskoe c. 1984
- Born: c. 1696; Ethiopian Empire or Cameroon (see Debate over Gannibal's place of birth)
- Died: 14 May 1781 (aged 84–85); Saint Petersburg, Russian Empire
- Other name: Petrov Hannibal
- Spouses: Evdokia Dioper (m. 1731; div. 1753) Christina Regina Siöberg (m. 1736, unrecognized until 1753)
- Children: 10 (including Ivan, Pyotr, and Osip)
- Relatives: Gannibal family
- Military career
- Allegiance: Tsardom of Russia (1704–1721); Kingdom of France (1718–1722); Russian Empire (1721–1781)
- Service years: 1718–1722 (Kingdom of France); 1723–1762 (Imperial Russia)
- Rank: General-in-chief (Imperial Russia); Captain (Kingdom of France)
- Conflicts: War of the Quadruple Alliance; Battle of Fuenterrabia
- Other work: Master military engineer, military officer, teacher, author

Signature
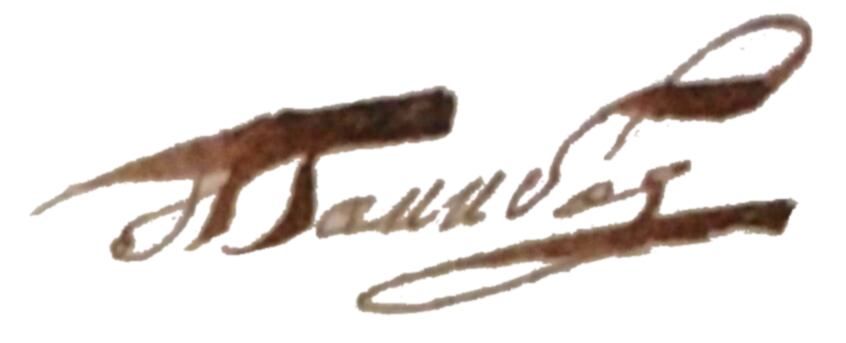

Abram Petrovich (Note: The Russian middle name or patronym is based on the father's first name; in this case it is based on the godfather's, Peter the Great.) Gannibal, also Hannibal or Ganibal, or Abram Hannibal or Abram Petrov (Russian: Абра́м Петро́вич Ганниба́л; c. 1696 – 14 May 1781), was a Russian Chief Military Engineer, General-in-Chief, and nobleman of African origin. As a child, Gannibal was captured by Ottomans and brought to Russia as a gift for Peter the Great. He was then raised in the emperor's court, with the emperor becoming his godfather at his baptism.

Gannibal eventually rose to become a prominent member of the imperial court in the reign of Peter's daughter Elizabeth. He had ten children, most of whom became members of the Russian nobility. One of his great-grandsons was the author and poet Alexander Pushkin.

== Early life ==
The main reliable accounts of Gannibal's early life come from The Moor of Peter the Great, Pushkin's unfinished biography of his great-grandfather, published after Pushkin's death in 1837. Scholars argue that Pushkin's account may be inaccurate due to the author’s desire to elevate the status of his ancestors and family. There are a number of contradictions between the biographies of Pushkin and the German novel The Blackamoor of Peter the Great, based on his great-grandfather.

Richard Pankhurst, the former professor at the Institute of Ethiopian Studies at the University of Addis Ababa in Ethiopia, believed the young Abram, Ibrahim or Abraham, as he named him, was born around 1698. He was the son of a minor "prince" or chief. His father was relatively affluent, owning many livestock both inherited and taken in battle; he had several wives and 19 children. However, after his father died in battle trying to defend his territory from the Ottoman Turks trying to conquer the Red Sea, Abram was captured and taken to Constantinople by ship. His sister, Lagan, is said to have drowned in the sea in a desperate attempt to save her brother.

Abram stayed in the Ottoman Empire for about a year in the service of Sultan Ahmed III's household. At the time, the Russian ambassador Sava Vladislavich-Raguzinsky, representing Peter the Great, was looking for "a few clever little African slaves" for the Tsar's palace in Moscow; a Kammermohr was a common feature of European courts of the time, as an exotic symbol of the court's prestige. On orders of Vladislavich's superiors (one of whom was Pyotr Andreyevich Tolstoy, great-grandfather of the celebrated writer Leo Tolstoy), Abram was selected for this purpose and soon ransomed from the Sultan's viziers with a bribe. In 1704, the ambassador immediately dispatched him by land to Moscow in order to be presented to Tsar Peter the Great.

The Tsar is noted to have taken a liking to the boy's intelligence and potential for military service, and brought the child into his household. Abram was baptized in 1705, in St. Paraskeva Church in Vilnius, with Peter as his godfather. The date of Gannibal’s baptism held personal significance; he used that date as his birthday because he did not know his actual date of birth.

Abram valued his relationship with his godfather, as well as that of Peter's daughter (Elizabeth), and was loyal to them as if they were family. Starting at a young age, the boy Abram would travel alongside the emperor during his military campaigns, and at these military journeys he served as his godfather’s valet.

== Education ==
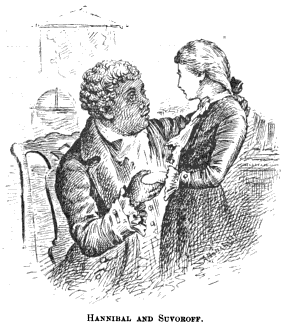
1888 artist's conception of Gannibal speaking with Alexander Suvorov.

In 1717, Abram was sent to Metz, France, to receive an education in the arts, sciences and warfare from the highest institutes available. By then he was fluent in several languages and excelled in mathematics and geometry. In 1718 Abram joined the French Royal Army with hopes of pleasing his godfather by expanding his learning in military engineering. He enrolled in the royal artillery academy at La Fère in 1720. During Abram's studies, conflict broke out between France and Spain, and he fought in the War of the Quadruple Alliance, rising to the rank of captain. While fighting on the French side against Spain, Abram received a head injury and was captured by the Spanish army. He was released in 1722 and continued his studies in Metz.

It was during his time in France that Abram adopted the surname "Gannibal" in honor of the Carthaginian general Hannibal (Gannibal being the traditional transliteration of the name in Russian). In Paris he met and befriended such Enlightenment figures as Montesquieu and Voltaire (this claim by his biographer Hugh Barnes is disputed by reviewer Andrew Kahn). Voltaire called Gannibal the "dark star of the Enlightenment". Gannibal returned to Russia the following year and became first an engineer and then a mathematics tutor for one of the Tsar's private guard units.

== Career ==
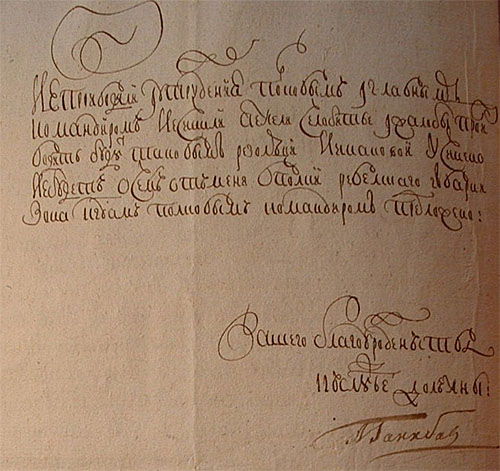
Letter signed by A. Ganibal (note only one 'n') on 22 March 1744. Tallinn City Archives.

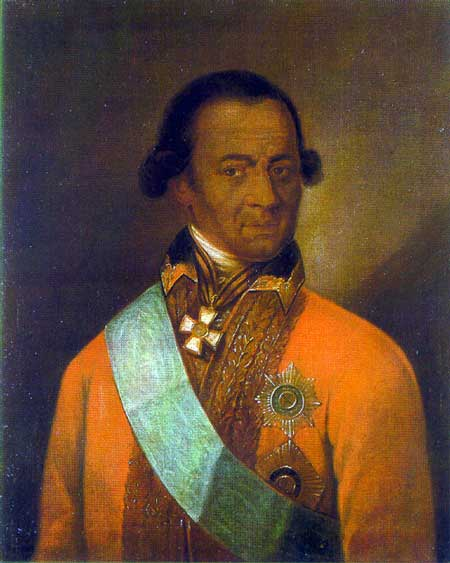
Portrait of German-Russian General Ivan Ivanovich Möller-Sakomelsky, as identified by Natalya Teletova; other studies identify it as a portrait of Abram Petrovich Gannibal

Gannibal's education was completed by 1723, and he was due to return to Russia. After the death of Peter in 1725, Prince Menshikov gained power in Russia due to his good standing with Peter. However, Menshikov was not fond of Gannibal and was suspicious of his foreign origins and superior education. Gannibal was exiled to Siberia in 1727. He first traveled to Kazan, then to Tobolsk and Irkutsk, and then to Selenginsk near the Mongolian border. He was pardoned in 1730 due to his technical skills, and completed his service in Siberia in 1733. During this time he built a fortress and led several construction projects, where he became a master engineer.

Elizabeth of Russia became the new monarch in 1741. Gannibal became a prominent member of her court, rose to the rank of major-general, and became superintendent of Reval (now Tallinn, Estonia), a position he held from 1742 to 1752. A letter signed on 22 March 1744 by "A. Ganibal" is held at the Tallinn City Archives. In 1742, the Empress Elizabeth gave him the Mikhailovskoye estate in Pskov Oblast with hundreds of serfs. After being made the chief military engineer of the Russian army in 1756, he received the rank of general-in-chief in 1759. He eventually retired to the estate Empress Elizabeth gave him, in 1762 during the reign of Catherine the Great.

In an official document that Gannibal submitted in 1742 to Empress Elizabeth, while petitioning for the rank of nobility and a coat of arms, he asked for the right to use a family crest emblazoned with an elephant and the mysterious word "FVMMO", which may mean "homeland" in the Kotoko language. In his book, Gannibal: The Moor of Petersburg, Hugh Barnes writes of meeting with the sultan of Logone-Birni, who gave him the same translation of the word. However, Frances Somers-Cocks, author of The Moor of St Petersburg: In the Footsteps of a Black Russian, met the same sultan and received a different translation for FVMMO. She also suggested that FVMMO stands for the Latin expression Fortuna Vitam Meam Mutavit Omnino which means "Fortune has changed my life entirely."

== Family ==
Gannibal married twice. His first wife was Evdokia Dioper, a Greek woman. The couple married in 1731. Dioper despised her husband, whom she was forced to marry. The marriage between Dioper and Gannibal was very volatile, and he suspected her of infidelity early in their marriage. Gannibal’s suspicions were confirmed when Dioper gave birth to a white daughter. When Gannibal found out that she had been unfaithful to him, he had her arrested and thrown into prison, where she spent eleven years.

Gannibal began living with another woman, Christina Regina Siöberg (1705–1781), daughter of Mattias Johan Siöberg and wife Christina Elisabeth d'Albedyll, and married her bigamously in Reval, Estonia, in 1736, a year after the birth of their first child and while he was still lawfully married to his first wife. His divorce from Dioper did not become final until 1753, upon which a fine and a penance were imposed on Gannibal, and Dioper was sent to a convent for the rest of her life. Gannibal's second marriage was nevertheless deemed lawful after his divorce. Gannibal’s second marriage to Christina was much happier, and he appreciated her fidelity and affection towards him.

On her paternal side, Gannibal’s second wife was descended from noble families in Scandinavia and Germany: Siöberg (Sweden), Galtung (Norway), and Grabow (Denmark) / von Grabow (Brandenburg). Her paternal grandfather was Gustaf Siöberg, Rittmester til Estrup, who died in 1694, whose wife Clara Maria Lauritzdatter Galtung (ca. 1651–1698) was the daughter of Lauritz Lauritzson Galtung (ca. 1615–1661) and of Barbara Grabow til Pederstrup (1631–1696).

Abram Gannibal and Christine Regina Siöberg had ten children. Their oldest son, Ivan, became an accomplished naval officer who helped found the city of Kherson in southern Ukraine in 1779 and attained the rank of general-in-chief, the second-highest military rank in imperial Russia. His son, Osip, had a daughter, Nadezhda, who became the mother of the great writer Alexander Pushkin. More than one British aristocratic family descends from Pushkin, notably the Grosvenors (Duke of Westminster via Anastasia de Torby) and the Mountbattens (Marquess of Milford Haven, via Anastasia's sister Nadejda de Torby). Another son, Pyotr Abramovich Gannibal was a Major-General in the Artillery.

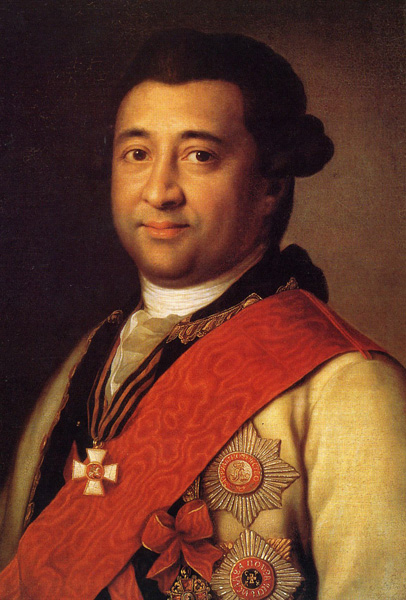
Ivan Gannibal, Gannibal's eldest son, with Order of St. George

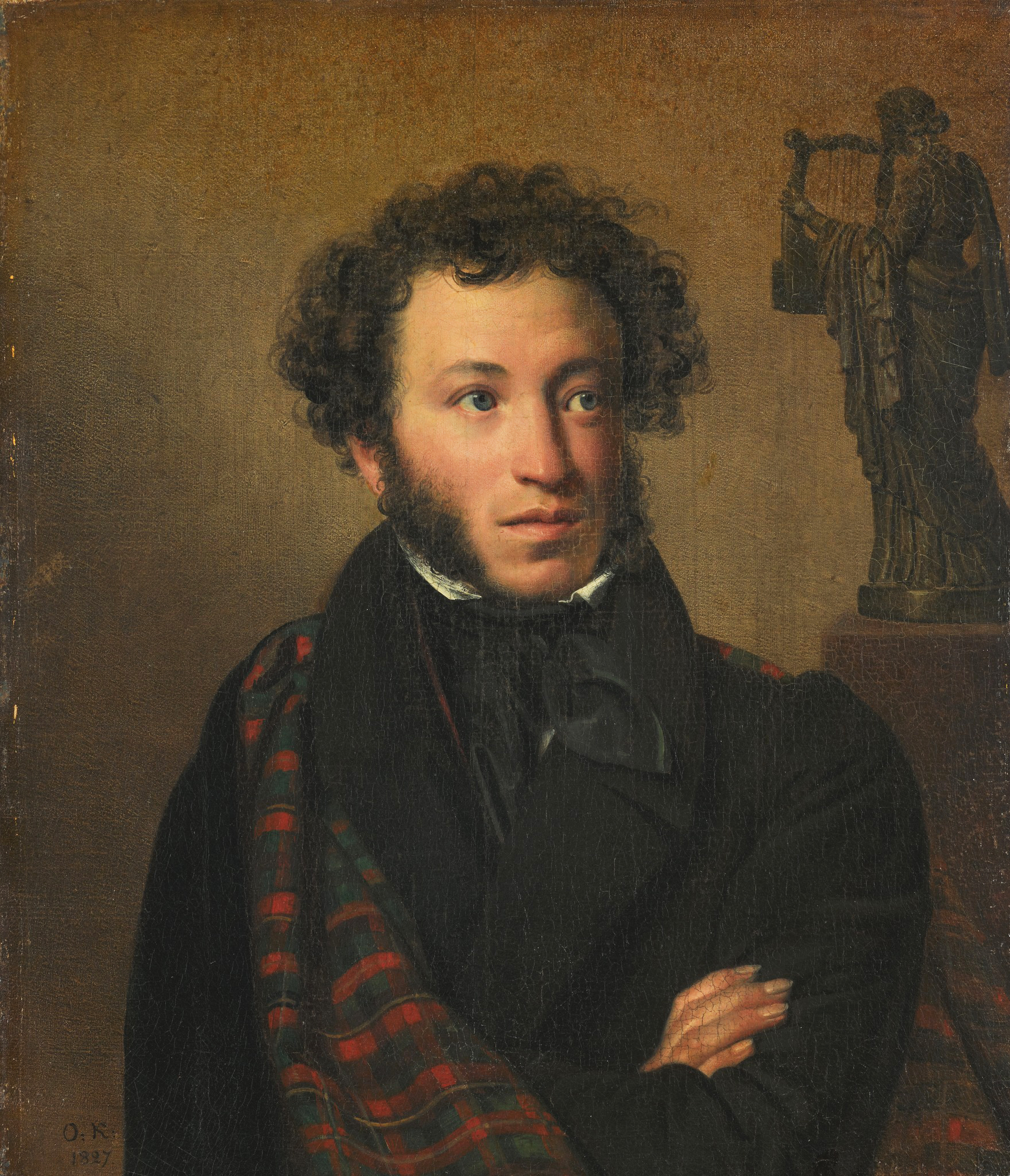
Alexander Pushkin, Gannibal's great-grandson through Osip

== Legacy ==
=== Debate over Gannibal's place of birth ===
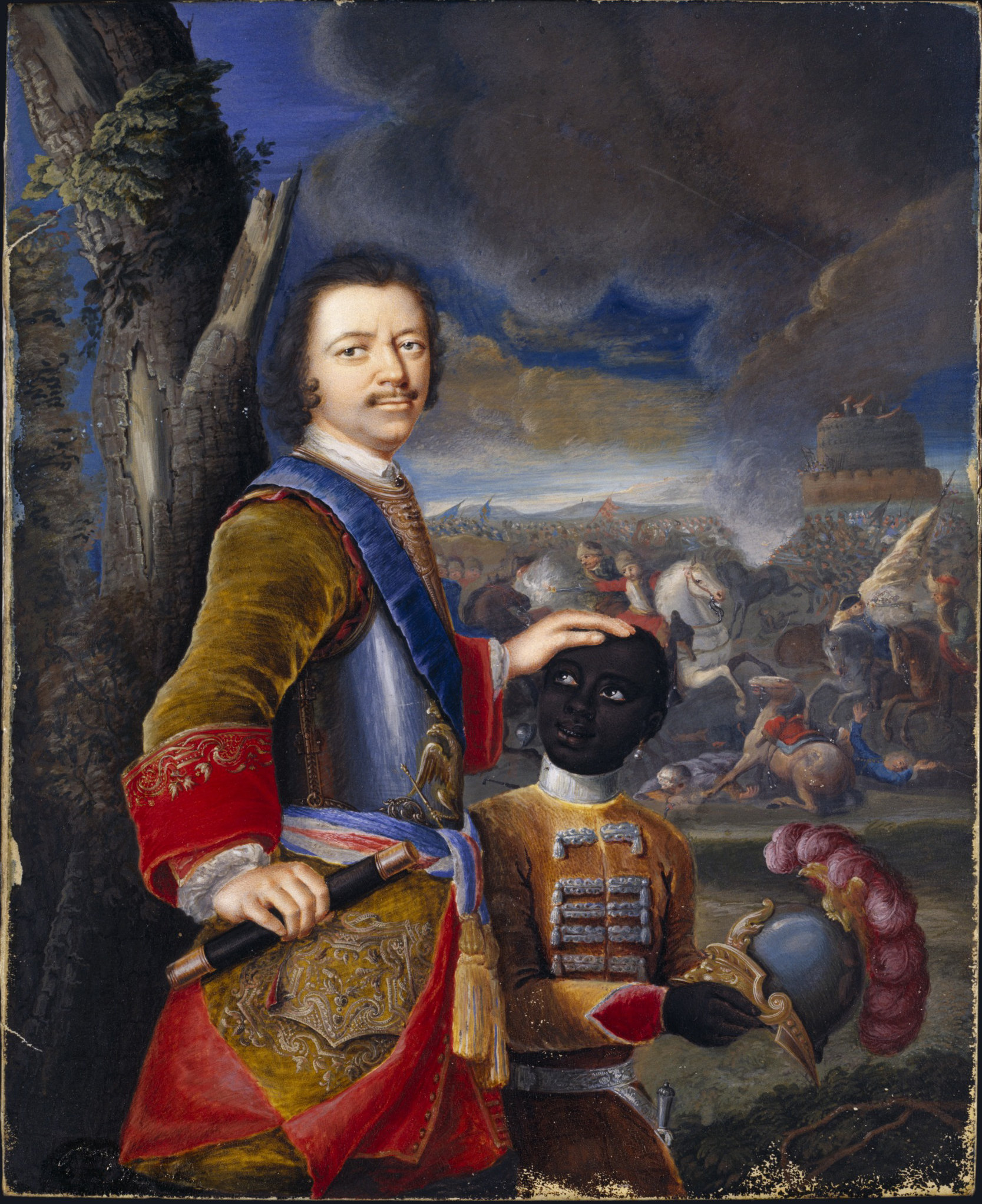
Peter the Great with a Black page, by Gustav Von Mardefeld. Gannibal would have been in his mid-twenties at the time of this painting, so he is not the Black page depicted here.

Gannibal's actual place of birth continues to be uncertain, and is subject to speculation by modern historians. Until recent scholarly field work, it was generally assumed that he originated in Ethiopia. Chiefly Russian scholars for many years believed that he was from the vicinity of Mereb Melash, a province of the Ethiopian Empire in present-day Eritrea. In a letter he wrote to Empress Elizabeth, Peter the Great's daughter, Gannibal stated that he was from the town of "Logon" or "Lagone". Anthropologist Dmitry Anuchin wrote an essay about Alexander Pushkin in which he theorized that "Lagone" referred to Logo-chewa in Eritrea. In 1999, the Russian Institute in Addis Ababa, the capital of Ethiopia, also campaigned for a commemorative stamp to honor Pushkin's bicentennial.

The governments of Ethiopia and Eritrea each claim that Gannibal was born in their respective territories. Under this belief, the Ethiopian government named a street in Addis Ababa after Alexander Pushkin, Gannibal's great-grandson. It also placed a bust of him near the African Union headquarters in 2002, and arranged for a statue of Pushkin to be transferred from Moscow to Addis Ababa in 2014. However, the notion that Gannibal may have been born in Ethiopia holds little currency with the general Ethiopian population. The Eritrean government asserts that Gannibal was instead born in Loggo Sarda, an area in modern Eritrea. It also erected its own statue of Pushkin and named a street after him in 2009.

Vladimir Nabokov cast doubt on Gannibal's ancestry, based on research findings during his work translating Pushkin's novel Eugene Onegin. Nabokov disagreed with Anuchin's theory, stating that it was just as likely that Gannibal was referring to "the Lagona region of equatorial Africa, south of Lake Chad." Support for Anuchin's theory of Ethiopian birth declined after it was exposed as racially based, implying that "hamitic" Ethiopian origins better explained Gannibal's success than "negroid" origins.

The Beninese historian Dieudonné Gnammankou, an expert on Russia, studied Russian, French and African sources and argued that Gannibal was indeed from Logone-Birni and was most likely the son of a chief in the ancient sultanate. In 1995, Gnammankou asserted that the "Logon" Gannibal wrote about was actually Logone, capital of the old Kotoko kingdom of Logone-Birni, now located in northern Cameroon. He believed that the pattern of slave trade around Lake Chad made that region a more plausible likelihood for Gannibal's birthplace than Gondar, Ethiopia. Gnammankou's biography of Gannibal was translated into Russian, and was voted the best book on Pushkin at the 1999 Moscow Book Fair.

Gnammankou's findings were in turn buttressed by the field work of Hugh Barnes. After consulting with the Sultan of Logone-Birni, Barnes found that an inscription on Gannibal's crest, which was hitherto undecipherable, corresponded with the term for "homeland" in the local Kotoko language of central Africa. However, Frances Somers-Cocks, author of The Moor of St Petersburg: In the Footsteps of a Black Russian, met the same sultan and received a different translation for FVMMO. She also suggested that FVMMO stands for the Latin expression Fortuna Vitam Meam Mutavit Omnino, which means "Fortune has changed my life entirely".

=== Honor at La Fère ===
In November 2010, representatives from Russia and Estonia, the ambassador of Cameroon, and the sultan of Logone-Birni went to La Fère, France to unveil a commemorative plaque honoring Abram Petrovich Gannibal as a graduate of La Fère's royal artillery academy. The academy, which closed in the 1990s, had been started by King Louis XV shortly before Gannibal's enrollment there in 1720. The plaque declares that he was a graduate of the royal artillery academy of La Fère, and later became chief military engineer and general-in-chief of the Imperial Russian Army. It also notes that Gannibal is the great-grandfather of Alexander Pushkin, Russia's greatest poet. Dieudonné Gnammankou, whose research into Gannibal's background was largely responsible for the ceremony at La Fère taking place, also served as the main speaker at a symposium following the event.

== In popular culture ==
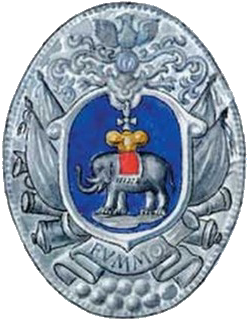
Coat of arms of Abram Gannibal

=== Literature ===
Alexander Pushkin used his great-grandfather Abram Gannibal as the model for Ibrahim, the lead character in his unfinished novel The Moor of Peter the Great. After leaving school in 1817, Pushkin met Abram's last surviving son, Peter. He met Peter again in 1825, after writing in his diary about wanting to "get from him some memoirs about my great-grandfather." He seemed to use his own experiences, along with Gannibal's to create the plot for The Moor of Peter the Great. A stage version of the work was written by Carlyle Brown and premiered at the Alabama Shakespeare Festival's 13th Southern Writers' Project in March 2001.

=== Art and film ===
Abram Gannibal is a protagonist of the Soviet comedy movie How Czar Peter the Great Married Off His Moor, although the film's plot has almost nothing to do with Gannibal's real biography. The film is partly based on Pushkin's Moor of Peter the Great.

There are several portraits thought to depict Gannibal, which include a painting of the Battle of Lesnaya by Pierre-Denis Martin the Younger. The young boy present in Martin’s painting is argued to be Gannibal, because of the young boy’s role as valet to Peter during military campaigns and Gannibal’s possible connection to the artist while in France. A portrait by Adriaan Schoonebeeck is also believed to portray Gannibal during his time with Peter the Great. In Schoonebeeck’s portrait of Peter the Great, the young servant boy directly behind Peter is thought to be Gannibal. Although there are a variety of portraits that claim to contain Gannibal, there is little evidence to suggest the claims are accurate. In the Lesnaya painting, the young boy is dressed in traditional slave attire, which Gannibal did not wear due to his status under Peter the Great.

== See also ==
- Afro-Russians
- Representation of slavery in European art
- List of slaves
- List of kidnappings

== Biographies ==
- Life of Ganibal, D. S. Anuchin, 1899.
- Gannibal: the Moor of Petersburg, by Hugh Barnes, hardback 2005. ISBN 1-86197365-9.
- The Moor of St Petersburg: In the Footsteps of a Black Russian, by Frances Somers Cocks, paperback 2005. ISBN 0-95440342-8.
- Abraham Hannibal and the Raiders of the Sands, by Frances Somers Cocks, paperback 2003 [historical novel for children]. ISBN 0-95440340-1.
- Abraham Hannibal and the Battle for the Throne, by Frances Somers Cocks, paperback 2003 [historical novel for children]. ISBN 0-95440341-X.
- Abraham Hanibal – l’aïeul noir de Pouchkine by Dieudonné Gnammankou, paperback, Paris 1996. ISBN 2-70870609-8.
- Абрам Петрович Ганнибал [Abram Petrovich Gannibal], Георг Леетс [Georg Leets], Таллин [Tallinn], paperback 1984.
- Notes on prosody: and Abram Gannibal by Vladimir Nabokov, 1964. ISBN 0-69101760-3.
- Жизнь Ганнибала – прадеда Пушкина [The Life of Hannibal, Pushkin's Great Grandfather] by Наталья Константиновна Телетова [Natalja Konstantinovna Teletova], hardback, St. Petersburg 2004. ISBN 5-94921-004-2.
