= How Czar Peter the Great Married Off His Moor =

- Directed by: Alexander Mitta
- Written by: Yuli Dunsky; Valeri Frid; Aleksandr Mitta
- Starring: Vladimir Vysotsky; Aleksei Petrenko; Ivan Ryzhov; Irina Mazurkevich; Mikhail Kokshenov; Yevgeni Mitta
- Cinematography: Valeri Shuvalov
- Edited by: Z. Karpukhina; Nadezhda Veselyovskaya
- Music by: Alfred Schnittke
- Production company: Gorky Film Studio
- Release date: 1976
- Running time: 100 minutes
- Country: Soviet Union
- Language: Russian

How Czar Peter the Great Married Off His Moor (Russian: Сказ про то, как царь Пётр арапа женил, Skaz pro to, kak tsar Pyotr arapa zhenil) is a 1976 musical film directed by the Russian filmmaker Alexander Mitta. The film features Vladimir Vysotsky as the protagonist Abram Petrovich Gannibal, the African godson of Peter the Great. Also starring in the film are Aleksei Petrenko as Czar Peter, and Irina Mazurkevich as Natasha Rtishcheva. It is an adaptation of the book The Moor of Peter the Great by Gannibal's great-grandson Alexander Pushkin, written in 1827-1828 and published in 1837. The music for the film was written by the composer Alfred Schnittke. In 1976, the film was the sixth most popular film in the Soviet Union, being seen 33,100,000 times.

== Plot ==
The beginning of the film contains some animations depicting Abram's acquisition from his native land and eventually we find him in the courts of Paris. He gets himself in trouble when a French countess, whom he had had a romance with, bears a black child. Abram is challenged to a duel which is played out humorously in a sped up timeframe. He leaves Paris shortly thereafter to return to his home in St. Petersburg where his godfather, and czar of Russia Peter the Great enthusiastically awaits his return. Upon arriving Abram expresses he is done with love, as his lover denounces him as a savage and his son is never fated to know his father. In an attempt to help Abram, as well as tie him into the nobility of Russia, Peter announces Abram and Natasha Rtishcheva are to be wed, to the despair of the family and her current suitor. Abram, however, refuses the marriage on the grounds that he believes Natasha is in love with another. This angers the czar who in turn begins to alienate both Abram and Natasha's family from his favor. The conundrum plays out in humorous and dramatic ways and eventually resolves in a pleasant and light-hearted manner.

== See also ==
- Vladimir Vysotsky in movies

== Cast ==
- Vladimir Vysotsky as Abram Petrovich Gannibal
- Aleksei Petrenko as Peter the Great
- The Rtishchevs:
  - Ivan Ryzhov as Gavrilo Afanasievich Rtishchev
  - Irina Mazurkevich as Natasha Rtishcheva
  - Mikhail Kokshenov as Sergunka Rtishchev
  - Yevgeny Mitta as Vanechka Rtishchev
- Semyon Morozov as Mishka Govorov
- Valeri Zolotukhin as Filka
- Mikhail Gluzsky as Jester Balakirev
- Oleg Tabakov as Pavel Ivanovich Yaguzhinski
