= Allan Dugbley =

Russian footballer

Allan Dugblei
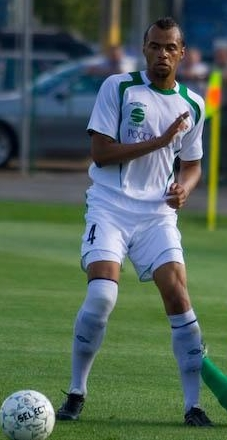

Personal information
- Full name: Allan Dzhoakimovich Dugblei
- Date of birth: 4 January 1985 (age 41)
- Place of birth: Moscow, Russian SFSR, Soviet Union
- Height: 1.84 m (6 ft 0 in)
- Position: Midfielder

Youth career
- SDYuSShOR-94 Krylatskoye Moscow

Senior career*
Years	Team	Apps	(Gls)
2000	FC Krylatskoye Moscow		
2001	FC Avtodor Vladikavkaz	0	(0)
2001–2003	FC Titan Moscow	11	(0)
2003–2004	FC Shinnik Yaroslavl	0	(0)
2004	FC Izhevsk	16	(2)
2004–2005	FC Dynamo-2 Kyiv	0	(0)
2005	FC Presnya Moscow	11	(0)
2005–2006	FC Nika Moscow	38	(0)
2007–2008	FC Torpedo-RG Moscow	59	(6)
2009	FC Chernomorets Novorossiysk	5	(0)
2009	FC Nara-ShBFR Naro-Fominsk	7	(1)
2010	FC Petrovka, 38 Moscow		
2011–2012	FC Oka Beloomut		
- * Club domestic league appearances and goals

Allan Dzhoakimovich Dugblei (Russian: Аллан Джоакимович Дугблей; born 4 January 1985) is a retired Russian professional football player.

== Club career ==
He made his Russian Football National League debut for FC Chernomorets Novorossiysk on 8 April 2009 in a game against FC Vityaz Podolsk.

== Personal life ==
His mother is Russian and his father is from Ghana. As a child, he lived in Africa for several years.
