= Gillon Aitken =

English literary agent (1938–2016)

- Born: Gillon Reid Aitken; 29 March 1938; Calcutta, India
- Died: 28 October 2016 (aged 78)
- Occupation: Literary agent
- Known for: Founder of agency Aitken Alexander Associates

Gillon Reid Aitken (29 March 1938 – 28 October 2016) was an English literary agent and founder of the agency Aitken Alexander Associates.

He was born in Calcutta, India, and spent his early years in Darjeeling, before attending boarding school in the UK. Skipping university, he studied Russian at the Joint Services School for Linguists in London, and then worked in Berlin for British intelligence.

Moving on to publishing, he worked at Chapman & Hall for a number of years, and then ran the publishing house of Hamish Hamilton. In the mid-1970s he embarked on a new career as a literary agent. Among his many famous clients were the Nobel Prize winner V. S. Naipaul and the Booker Prize winner Salman Rushdie.

As a literary translator, Aitken translated two books of short stories by Pushkin, as well as Alexander Solzhenitsyn's gulag classic One Day in the Life of Ivan Denisovich.

Aitken married Cari Bengtsson in 1982 and they divorced in 1998. Their daughter Charlotte was born in 1984 and died aged 27 in 2011. Aitken's will established the Charlotte Aitken Trust in her memory: it "aims to continue Gillon’s work of encouraging literary talent". In 2023 it was announced that the Trust would fund the £30,000 prize for the new Women's Prize for Non-Fiction for its first three years, and provide a statuette, "The Charlotte", for each winner.

Aitken died in October 2016.
