= Ivan Gannibal =

Russian general (1735–1801)

- Иван Абрамович Ганнибал
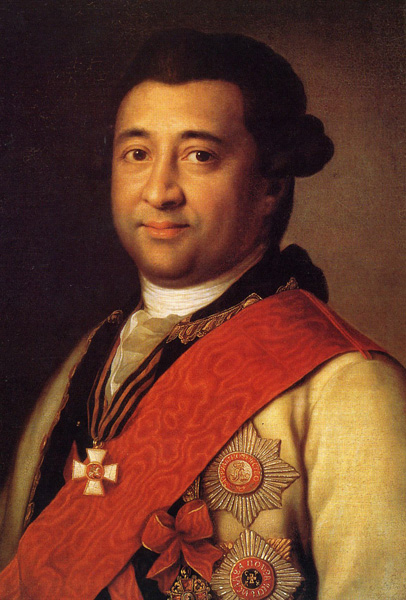
- Gannibal wearing the cross of the Order of St. George
- Born: 5 June 1735; Karjaküla, Reval Governorate, Russian Empire (now Estonia)
- Died: 12 October 1801 (aged 66); Sudya, Russian Empire
- Burial place: Lazarevskoe Cemetery; 59°55′23″N 30°23′14″E
- Relatives: Abram Petrovich Gannibal (father); Pyotr Abramovich Gannibal (brother); Alexander Pushkin (great-nephew)
- Military career
- Allegiance: Russian Empire
- Branch: Imperial Russian Navy
- Service years: 1744–1784
- Rank: General-in-chief
- Conflicts: Russo-Turkish War; Orlov revolt; Battle of Chesma

Ivan Abramovich Gannibal (Russian: Ива́н Абра́мович Ганниба́л; 5 June 1735 – 12 October 1801) was a Russian military leader. He was the son of military commander, general and engineer Abram Petrovich Gannibal, as well as the great-uncle of Russia's most famous poet, Alexander Pushkin.

Gannibal led a detachment of the Imperial Black Sea Fleet, which besieged and captured the Turkish fortress of Navarin during the Russo-Turkish War of 1768–1774, and took part in the founding of the city of Kherson. Gannibal's ultimate military rank was Général en Chef.

== Early life ==
Gannibal was the oldest of 10 children born to Abram Gannibal and his Swedish-German wife Christina Regina Siöberg in Karjaküla, Reval Governorate, Russian Empire (presently in Estonia). Gannibal was destined for a military career from an early age, entering the Naval Artillery School in the imperial capital at the age of 9. He would eventually graduate from the Naval Academy and join the Imperial Russian Navy as an officer.

== Russo-Turkish War ==
At the height of the Russo-Turkish War of 1768-1774, the 34-year-old Gannibal, in the rank of Brigadier, took a leading role in the siege and capture of the Ottoman fortress of Navarino in the Peloponnese.

The Russian Mediterranean Expeditionary Force under the command of Count Alexey Grigoryevich Orlov sent a squadron of ships toward Navarino in April 1770. Three of the vessels were sent toward shore with a forward force of 300 men and a number of artillery pieces, under Gannibal's command. The forward force commenced an artillery barrage on the fortress, eventually forcing its surrender on 10 April 1770 after several days of bombardment. The Russians would use Navarino as a temporary naval base for the following months. Gannibal was awarded the Order of St. George, third degree, for his actions in the siege of Navarino.

Gannibal also took part in the Battle of Chesma (near Chios) in July 1770. During the battle he was aboard the battleship "St. Eustathius" (Russian: Святой Евстафий Плакида, romanized: Svyatoy Yevstafiy Plakida), which exploded and sank as a result of the intense action. Gannibal had to be rescued from the water after the explosion.

== Later military career ==
In 1772 Gannibal was promoted to major general, and in 1776 he was given in the command of the entire naval artillery in the Imperial Navy. The following year, 1777, he was appointed by Empress Catherine II to a seat in the Russian Admiralty, the supreme governing body of the Imperial Navy.

=== Founding of Kherson ===
In 1778 Gannibal was appointed commander of the Kherson fortress, which he was tasked with building along with the surrounding city, on the order of Catherine II. He took to the task with zeal, erecting a functioning fortress and port within a relatively short period of time. For his efforts in the founding and building of Kherson, the Empress bestowed upon Gannibal the Order of St. Vladimir, first class (1780), the Order of St. Alexander Nevsky (1781), a jewel-encrusted snuff box decorated with a portrait of the Empress herself, and a 20,000-desiatina estate southwest of Kherson, now within the town of Bilozerka.

Gannibal is considered to be one of the founders of the city of Kherson. One of the squares of Kherson bears his name.

== Later life and death ==
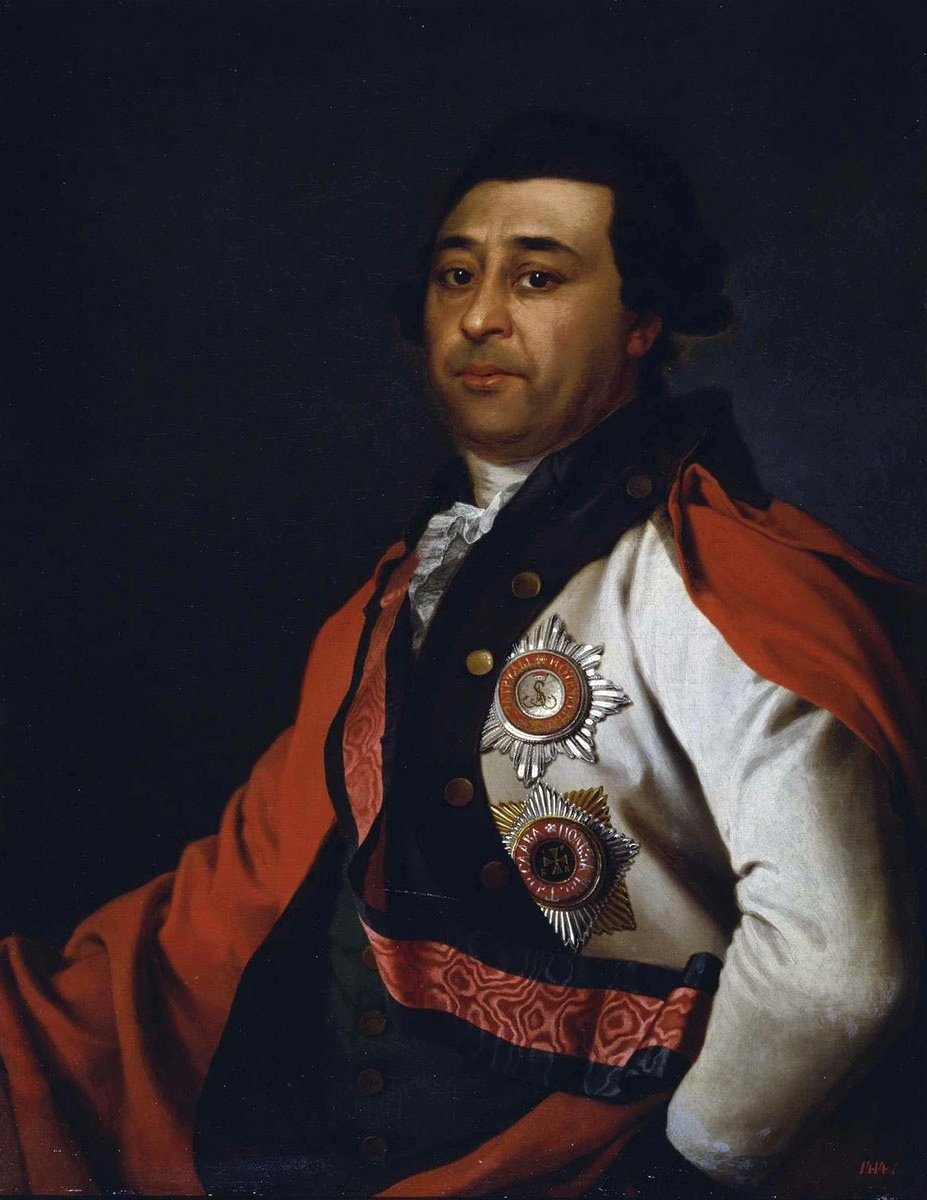
Portrait by Dmitry Levitzky, c. 1790

Gannibal retired from the army in 1784, having fallen out with Prince Grigory Potemkin. His ultimate rank was Général en Chef, the same rank as his father two decades before.

Gannibal retired to his father's estate (and final resting place) in the village of Suyda near the capital of Saint Petersburg. There he died, childless and a lifelong bachelor, in 1801. He was buried in the Lazarevskoe Cemetery in the Alexander Nevsky Lavra.

== Decorations ==
Gannibal received the following decorations from the Crown:

- Order of St. George, third class
- Order of St. Vladimir, first class
- Order of St. Alexander Nevsky
- Order of St. Anna, first class

== Gannibal in literature ==
Gannibal's great-nephew Alexander Pushkin devoted to his great-uncle a paragraph in his partial autobiography (1834) and a quatrain in his poem, "My Genealogy" (1830):

И был отец он Ганнибала,
Пред кем средь Чесменских пучин
Громада кораблей вставала,
И пал впервые Наварин.

Translation:

He [i.e., the author's great-grandfather] was the father of Gannibal,
Before whom, on the seas at Chesma,
Rose a multitude of ships,
And for the first time fell Navarin.
