= Jean Sagbo =

Beninese-Russian politician (1959–2024)

- Жан Грегуар Сагбо
- Born: Jean Gregoire Sagbo; 10 September 1959; Cotonou, Republic of Dahomey
- Died: late December 2024 (aged 65)
- Occupations: Politician; Businessman
- Spouse: Svetlana Sagbo
- Children: 2 (Jean-Maxim, born in 1985 and Serzh, born in 1990)

Jean Gregoire Sagbo (Russian: Жан Грегуар Сагбо, romanized: Zhan Greguar Sagbo, 10 May 1959 – late December 2024) was a Beninese-born Russian real estate agent and politician. His position was councilor of Novozavidovo in Konakovsky District, Tver Oblast. Sagbo was the first Russian of African descent, or Afro-Russian, to have been elected to a local council in the Russian Federation. Upon his election in 2010, he was referred to in some media as "Russia's Obama".

== Biography ==
Sagbo was born on 10 May 1959, in Cotonou in the southern coastal region of the Republic of Dahomey. He immigrated to the USSR in 1982 to study economics in Moscow. He settled in Novozavidovo, a town of approximately 10,000 people located 100 km north of Moscow, in 1989. During his first year in Novozavidovo, his then four-year-old son Maxim was spat upon. Sagbo completed his studies in 1984, and after that, he went back to Benin, but was arrested upon arrival because of his legal status in Russia as well as his political beliefs. He spent three years in detention, but the Russians secured his release when they heard about the persecution. Sagbo confronted the spitter, and eventually other onlookers supported Sagbo. Sagbo spoke in French-African-accented Russian.

About ten years prior to his first election, he organized a volunteer effort for an annual garbage collection day. He also planted flowers and cleaned streets in front of his home without pay.

As a councilor, Sagbo collected donations to turn dilapidated lots between buildings into parks. Sagbo was elected in 2010. He expressed annoyance at being referred to as "Russia's Obama" because the two are both merely black. The position of councilor is unpaid.

Sagbo has been quoted as saying "Novozavidovo is dying...this is my home, my town. We can't live like this." Vyacheslav Arakelov, the mayor of Novozavidovo said: "His skin is black but he is Russian inside...the way he cares about this place, only a Russian can care."

== Personal life and death ==
Sagbo was married to Svetlana, a resident of Novozavidovo, and had two children. He died in late December 2024 at the age of 65 and was buried in Savi, Benin, on 21 January 2025.
