= Agrippina Japaridze =

Georgian aristocrat and socialite

Agrippina
- Countess von Zarnekau
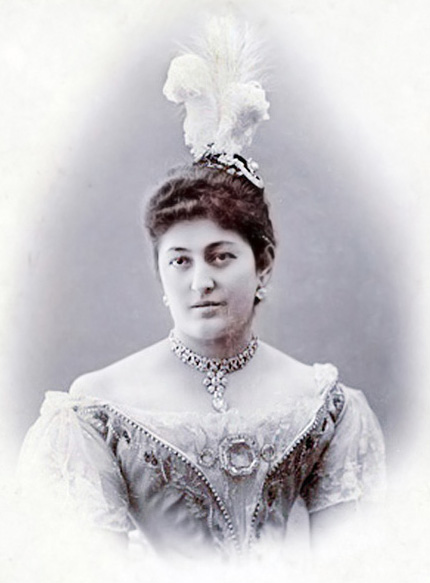
- Full name: Agrippina Constantines asuli Japaridze, Countess von Zarnekau
- Born: October 25, 1855; Racha, Georgia, Russian Empire
- Died: October 18, 1926 (aged 70); Kutaisi, Georgian SSR, Soviet Union
- Noble family: Japaridze (by birth); Dadiani (by marriage); Oldenburg (by marriage)
- Spouses: Prince Tariel Dadiani; Duke Constantine Petrovich of Oldenburg
- Issue: Countess Alexandra von Zarnekau; Countess Ekaterina von Zarnekau; Count Nikolai von Zarnekau; Count Alexei von Zarnekau; Count Petr von Zarnekau; Countess Nina von Zarnekau
- Father: Constantine Japaridze
- Mother: Melania Japaridze
- Occupation: aristocrat, socialite and patron of art and education

Agrippina, Countess von Zarnekau (née Agrippina Constantines asuli Japaridze; Georgian: აგრაფინა ჯაფარიძე, გრაფინია ფონ ზარნეკაუ) (October 25 [6 November o.s.] , 1855 – October 18, 1926) was a Georgian aristocrat, socialite and patron of numerous educational establishments in Russian Imperial Georgia. She was known for her scandalous divorce and her even more controversial role in the secret marriage of Grand Duke George Alexandrovich of Russia, which caused a rupture in the Russian Imperial Family. Her name is associated with architectural gems that still stand in Tbilisi and western Georgia, some of which continue to be subject of rumors surrounding the countess' eventful life and her tragic, solitary demise.

== Family and early years ==
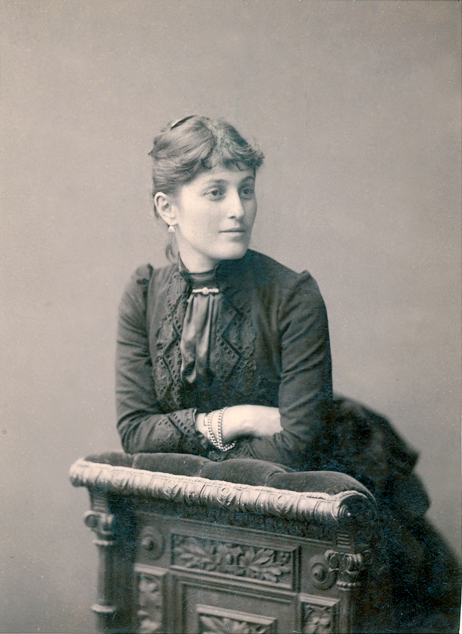
Young Agrippina

Agrippina was born Agrippina Constantines asuli Japaridze in the upper Racha region of Georgia, then part of Imperial Russia to Constantine and Melania Japaridze, members of collateral, untitled branch of Georgian princely House of Japaridze, that once ruled the Duchy of Racha. Her father Constantine died young in 1860 when Agrippina was five years old and her mother Melania moved to Kutaisi, where she remarried. In this new city Agrippina was sent to the St. Nino School (today, School No. 3), where she received her education along with Olympia Nikoladze, sister of Georgian statesman Nikolos Nikoladze and other members of well-off Georgian families.

== First marriage ==
In 1876, at the age of 21, Agrippina married a Mingrelian Prince Tariel Alexandrovich Dadiani (b. 1842), the grandson of Manuchar II Dadiani, former reigning Prince of Mingrelia (1791-1793). Tariel was the son of Prince Alexander Dadiani (d. 1856) and Princess Rodam Mikeladze (b. 1821), whose wife first wife, Princess Sophia Shervashidze (b. 1838) had passed away and left him with four children.

Agrippina is thought to have given Tariel at least several children (possibly Miquel, Levanti, and Nino), although this claim is disputed by sources close to the family, with others disagreeing on the number and gender of offspring. The marriage was not a particularly happy one, partly due to Prince Dadiani's gambling addiction, which may have played a role in Agrippina's future decisions.

== Second marriage ==
In the 1880s, Kutaisi became a new location for the 1st Cavalry Regiment of the Hopersky Kuban Cossacks, commanded by Duke Constantine Petrovich of Oldenburg, who had previously participated in the Russo-Turkish War (1877–78) and later became a general. Oldenburg was a 30-year old single, well-born bon vivant known for his extravagance and eccentricity, reasons that may have contributed to his assignment away from the Imperial capital by his relative Alexander III of Russia.

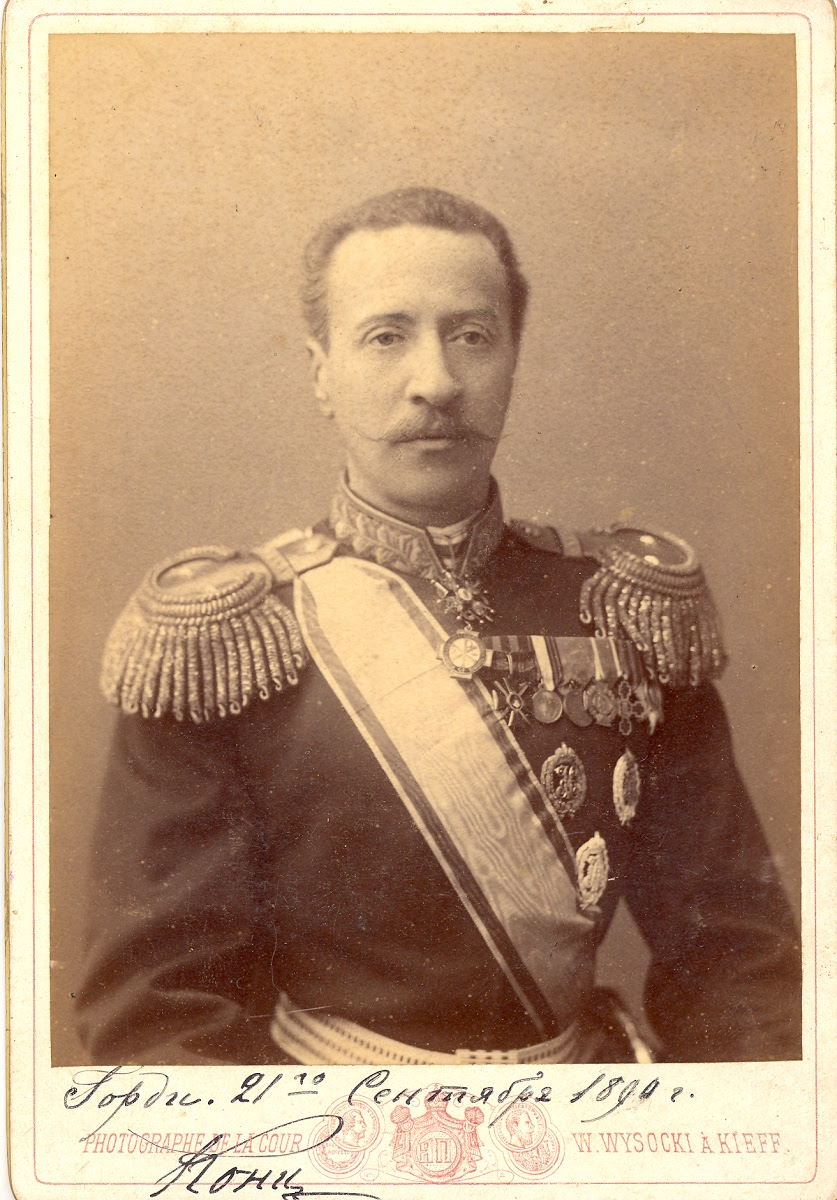
The Duke of Oldenburg, Agrippina's second husband

At that time, the Black Sea coast in Georgia had become a popular place for wealthy Russians to visit on vacation, and the arts scene in Tiflis began to thrive. Constantine Petrovich became a guest at the social salon of Barbara Bonner Baratashvili ("Babale"), whose mansion at 9 Reutov Street attracted many poets, painters, and writers. It was here that Constantine Petrovich first saw Agrippina. She was starring in the lead role of the play The Knight in the Panther's Skin, beautifully decorated by Hungarian painter Mihály Zichy.

Oldenburg was impressed with Agrippina in this successful play to the point that Agrippina's husband was furious about the Duke's excessive attention towards his wife. There are many rumors as to how Oldenburg convinced Tariel to accept a divorce, with the prevailing opinion being that the Duke offered him an enormous sum of one million gold rubles, although there is no concrete proof of this extravagant transaction. The event was considered scandalous in Georgia's high society, although its significance was overblown by numerous questionable rumors, such as that Agrippina was lost by her husband to Oldenburg in a game of cards, or that she had entered into an extramarital affair with Oldenburg before her divorce. Following the separation, the custody of Agrippina's children from her previous marriage were transferred to Tariel and his relatives, with no additional information as to whether there was any further interaction between them and their mother.

Agrippina and Constantine wed on October 20, 1882, and in the following 10 years the couple had six children, three boys and three girls. Despite the initially cold reception and criticism from Count Witte that Agrippina's French was not good enough, many at the Imperial court, including Tsar Nicholas II, were charmed by her, with later Western newspaper reports describing her as "an exceedingly lovely girl...from one of the most picturesque regions [of the Empire]". Moreover, marriage with Agrippina is thought to have transformed Duke Oldenburg into a more serious man, who later started a champagne and cognac factory in western Georgia. He also became heavily involved in the expansion of railroads to Poti, an emerging seaport at the time. Countess von Zarnekau, for her part, financed the education of numerous Georgian students abroad and later provided for and served on the governing board of the St. Nino School. Although originally a noblewoman, at no point before had the countess come into so much wealth.

== Secret wedding of Grand Duke George ==
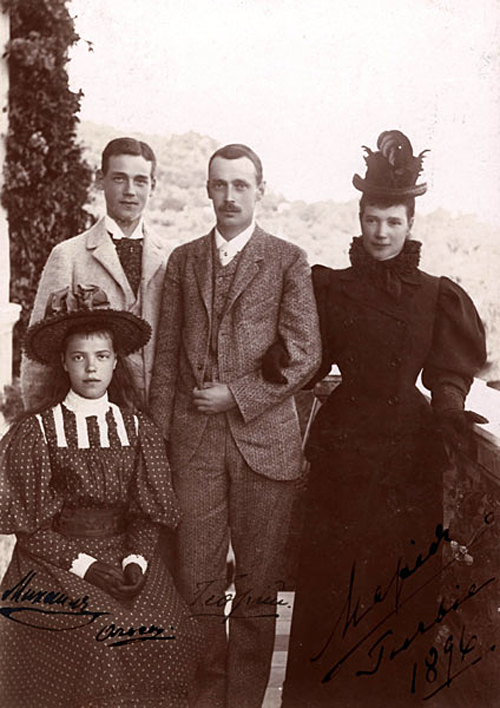
The Imperial family often visited George (center) while he lived in Georgia

Despite her increasing acceptance at the Imperial court, Agrippina became embroiled in a scandal when she and her husband reportedly facilitated a secret marriage between the Grand Duke George Alexandrovich of Russia and a Georgian noblewoman from the House of Nakashidze, who was Agrippina's cousin. The Duke was gravely ill and because his weak lungs could not take the weather of St. Petersburg, he was moved to southern Georgia near Likani, where the air is particularly beneficial for people with chronic respiratory disorders.

There Grand Duke George spent much time with Agrippina and Duke Oldenburg who, like many of the aristocrats in Georgia, traveled to the area frequently. "George spent much of his time in the company of...Oldenburg and of the latter's wife, who bears the title of Countess von Zarnekau, and it was under their roof that he met a very beautiful girl, a daughter of the princely Caucasian (Georgian) house of Nakashidze...George became infatuated with the young princess, and, in defiance of the commands of his brother and the entreaties of his mother, persisted in marrying her, although he was at the time Czarewitch and next heir to the crown...Duke Constantine of Oldenburg and his wife, Countess von Zarnekau, had furthered, instead of hindered the match, the princess being a cousin of the countess, and the latter, together with Constantine, was present at the wedding.""The couple lived together until George's death in 1899. They had two sons and one daughter."

Because George Alexandrovich was considered of very weak health and expected to die within years, the Emperor Alexander III refrained from banishing and depriving his disobedient son of his rank. At the same time, however, the marriage was not even recognized as morganatic, since it was concluded without the Emperor's permission, causing a rupture in the Imperial family's once happy relations. At the court, the Oldenburg family was "held responsible for all the matrimonial imbroglio of Czarewitch George, and also for the latter's estrangement from his mother, brothers and sisters during the closing years of his life."

== Final years ==
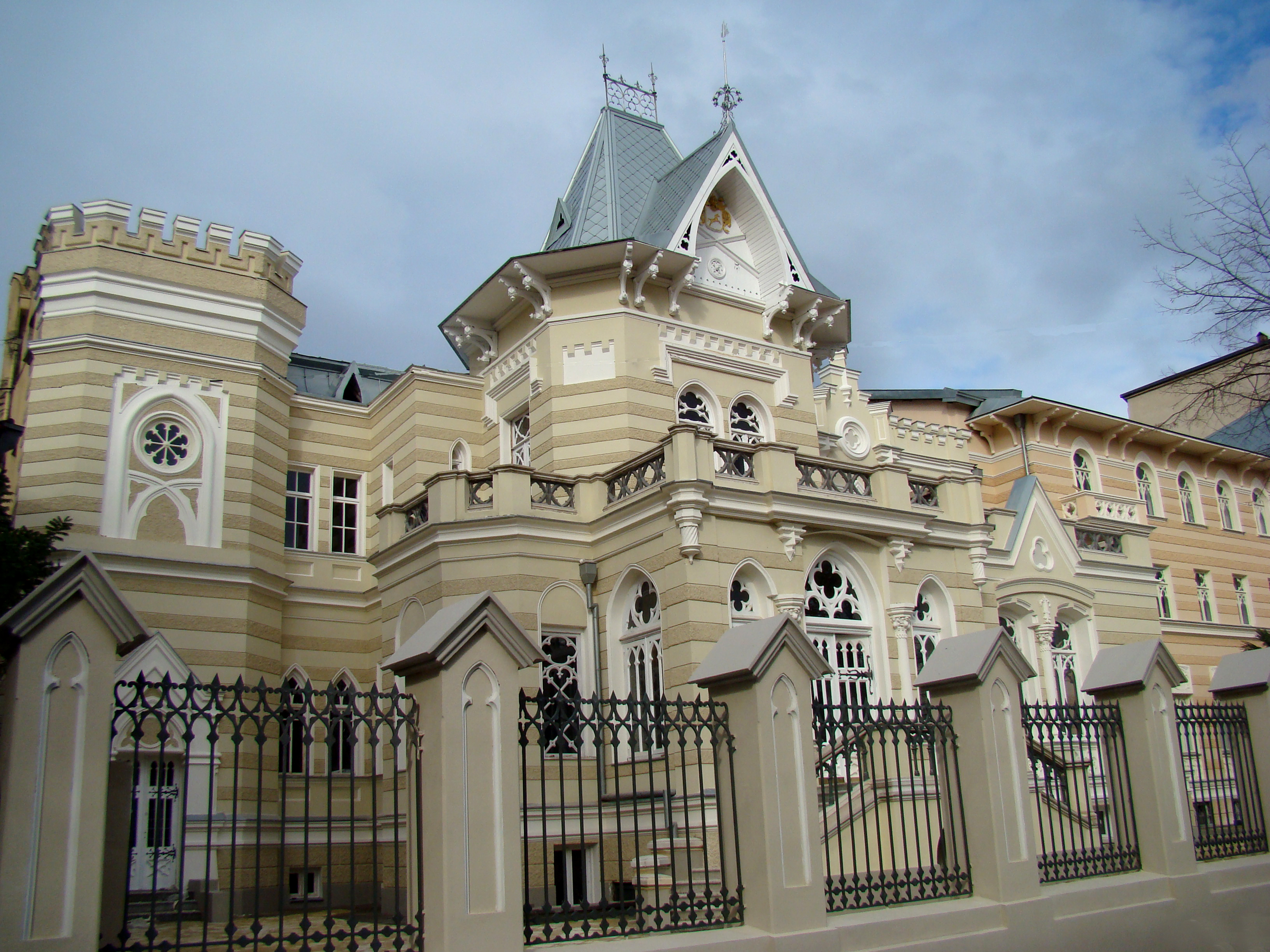
Agrippina’s former residence in Tbilisi, currently a museum

Largely estranged from the Imperial court as a result of the Grand Duke George affair, Agrippina moved with her husband to France, where he died in 1906. Agrippina is thought to have buried her husband at the Coastal Monastery of St. Sergius near St. Petersburg, following which she stayed in Russia for several years. As the revolutionary currents became increasingly threatening, most of her children, who were all married well, escaped to France, with the exception of Alexei, who was executed by the Bolsheviks in 1918.

Despite this tragedy and the increasingly volatile situation, Countess von Zarnekau stayed in Russia so that she could care for her mentally impaired daughter Nino, who was once famous for her alleged ability to summon spirits and was being treated in Kislovodsk, a town renowned for its spas. Nino passed away in the inauspicious year of 1922, when Bolshevik-conquered Georgia was officially made into a Soviet republic, ensuring that Agrippina would have no safety even in her native land. It is in these years that the countess faced many hardships; her property was confiscated by the Bolsheviks and her children abroad did not or could not send her financial help into the increasingly isolationist Union. Agrippina was forced to live in Western Georgia with and entirely dependent on her relatives there, passing away in 1926 due to lung-related problems. Separated from her entire family, Agrippina's casket was followed by only a few relatives as she was being buried at a presently-unknown cemetery in Kutaisi.

There are many other versions of Agrippina's death. One of the most pervasive beliefs is that she was hanged by the Bolsheviks somewhere in the Brick Gothic-style mansion that her husband had purchased for her in Tbilisi. The mansion, which was built at the turn of the century by a famous architect named Karl Stern, is often claimed to harbor the troubled ghost of the countess. It is possible that these rumors were triggered by the prolonged neglect of the property, which made the Gothic structure look very grim; after the Russian takeover, the mansion's unique chandeliers were taken down, its crystal floor destroyed, wall-decorations painted over and the building converted into a school for the deaf-mute. Throughout the 1990s the villa lay to rot but was restored in 2009 to house the Georgian State Museum of Theatre, Music, Cinema and Choreography at 6 Kargareteli Street, Tbilsi.

== See also ==
- Duke Constantine Petrovich of Oldenburg

== Sources ==
- Japaridze, Gocha. "აგრაფინა კისკისაო" ჩვენი მწერლობა, №20, 2011
