= Art Palace of Georgia - Museum of Cultural History =

Museum in Tbilisi, Georgia

Georgian State Museum of Theatre, Music, Cinema and Choreography
- საქართველოს ხელოვნების სასახლე – კულტურის ისტორიის მუზეუმი
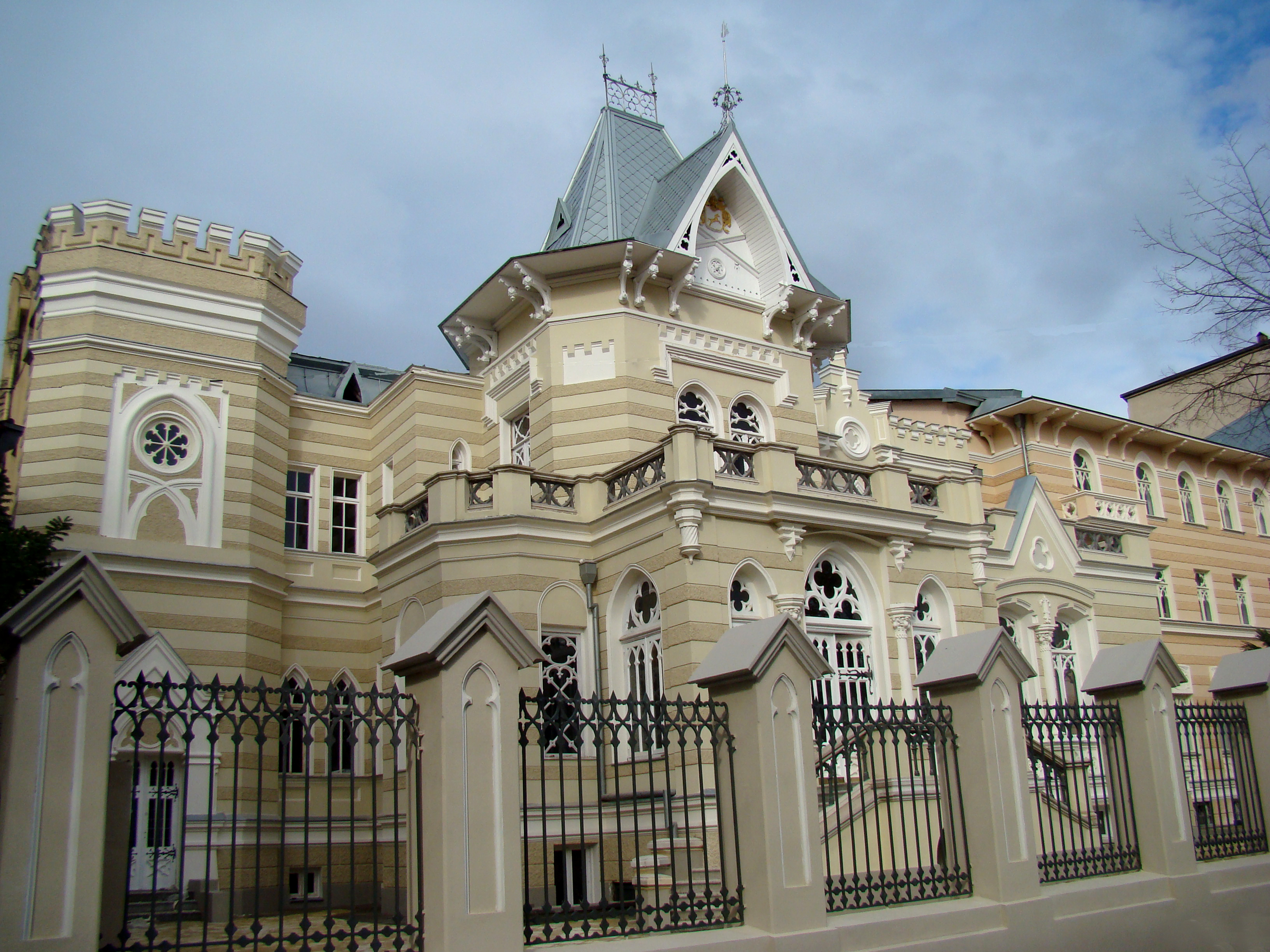
- Location: Georgia
- Coordinates: 41°43′N 44°47′E
- Website: www.artpalace.ge
- Location of Art Palace of Georgia - Museum of Cultural History

Art Palace of Georgia - Museum of Cultural History also referred to as Art Palace, (Georgian: საქართველოს ხელოვნების სასახლე – კულტურის ისტორიის მუზეუმი) is located in Tbilisi, Georgia. It is located on Kargareteli Street #6, and was the former Graph Oldenburg's Palace. The museum's exhibition halls are open from Tuesday till Sunday (10:30 - 17:30)

Until April 8, 2020, it was called the Georgian State Museum of Theater, Music, Cinema and Choreography. The name was changed according to the resolution of the Government of Georgia.

== History ==
Georgian Art Palace - Museum of Cultural History is a depository of Georgian cultural objects. The museum is housed in a building in Tbilisi. It was designed by a well-known architect of the time, Paul Stern, and, as an example of historicism, bears traces of Gothic architecture and Islamic architecture. Its interior was partially designed by Polish architect Aleksander Rogojski.

Museum building today

In 1882, Duke Constantine Petrovich of Oldenburg (1850-1906), a member of the Russian branch of the House of Oldenburg, met Agrippina Japaridze in Kutaisi. At the time she was married to Georgian nobleman from the House of Dadiani. Constantine Petrovich confessed his love for her. The confession turned Agrippina's head; they eloped and left Kutaisi and went to settle in Tiflis. Prince Oldenburg commissioned the building of the palace for his beloved as a token of his great affection for her.

In 1927, the Museum of Theatre, founded by David Arsenishvili (1905-1963)- a famous Georgian public figure (later appointed as the First Director of the Andrei Rublev Museum in Moscow), was moved to the building. The museum has more than 300,000 objects that provide information on the development of Georgian theatre, cinema, circus, folklore, opera, and ballet, as well as providing insight into the lives of figures in respective fields.

Some museum exhibits date back to the classical era. Of particular note is an antique mask which was excavated by archeologists in the town of Vani.

== Collection of Georgian Fine Arts ==
Georgian Art makes up large part of the collection. Around 10,000 exhibits of over 300 Georgian artists inform us about evolution of Georgian scenic design. The depository of fine arts contains portraits of theater actor and directors, sketches of stage decorations and costumes.

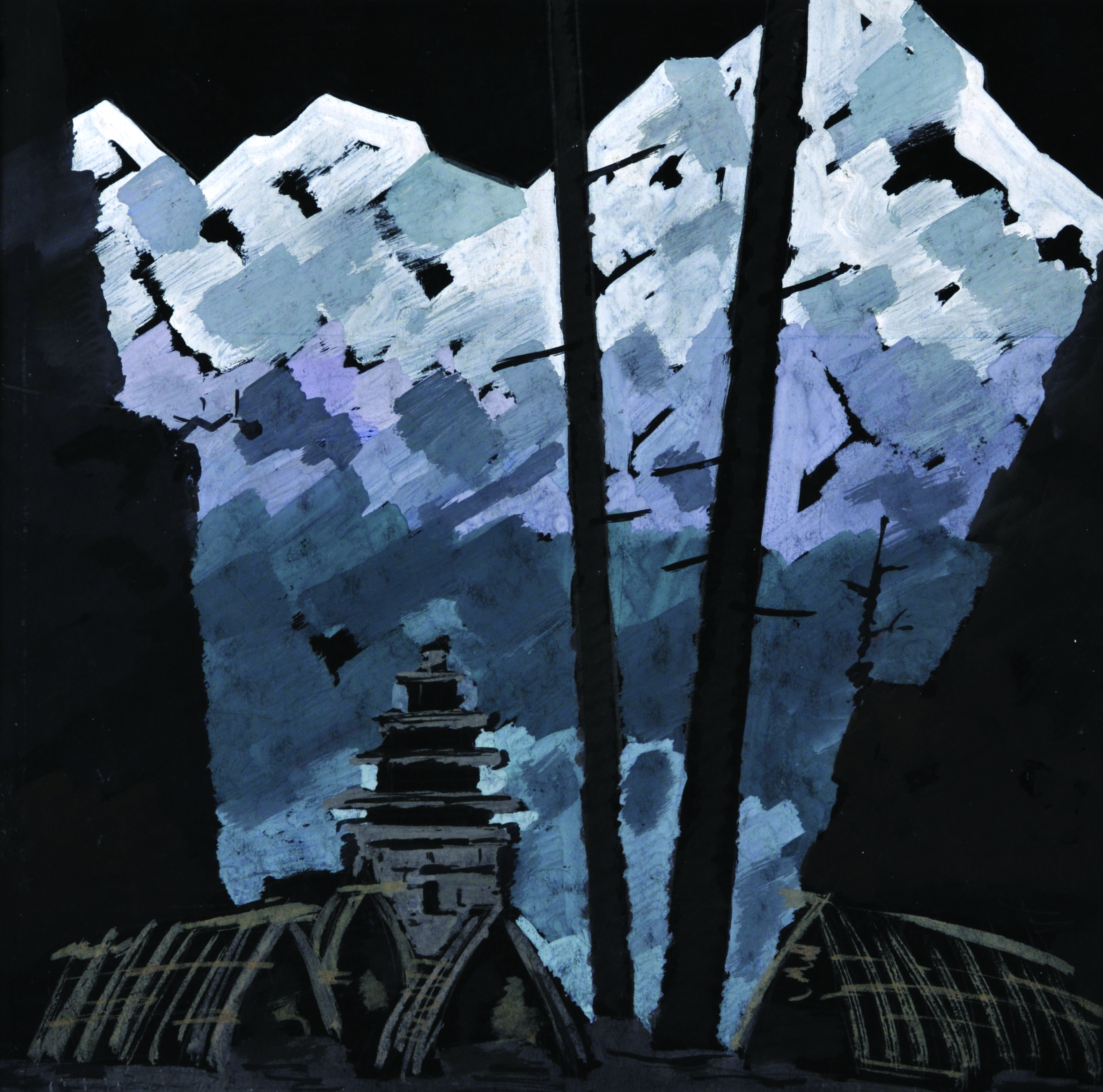
David Kakabadze Decoration for Ilo Mosashvili play 'Station Master' 1947

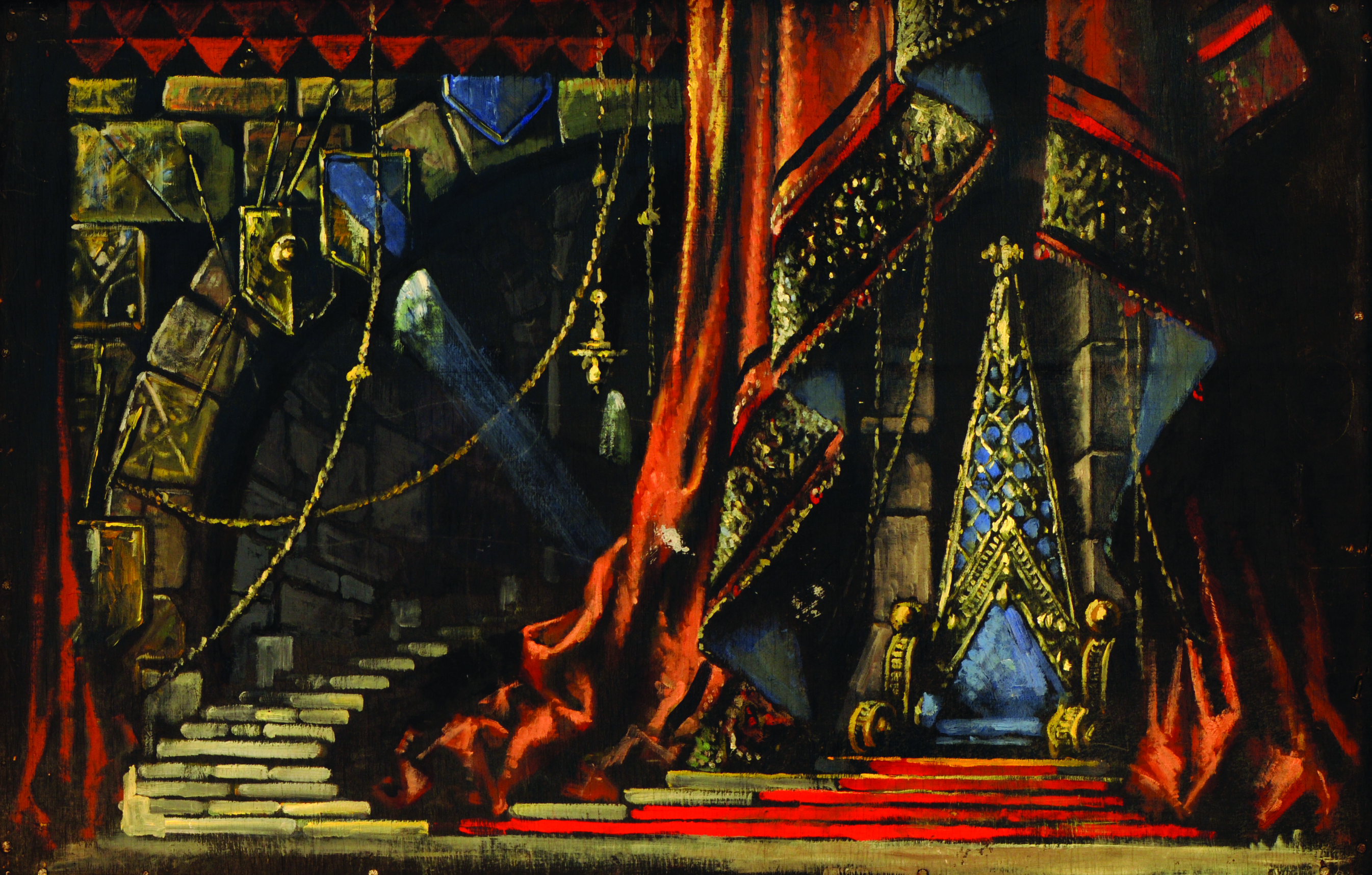
Decoration sketch for the play 'King Lear' (1948) by Sergo Kobuladze

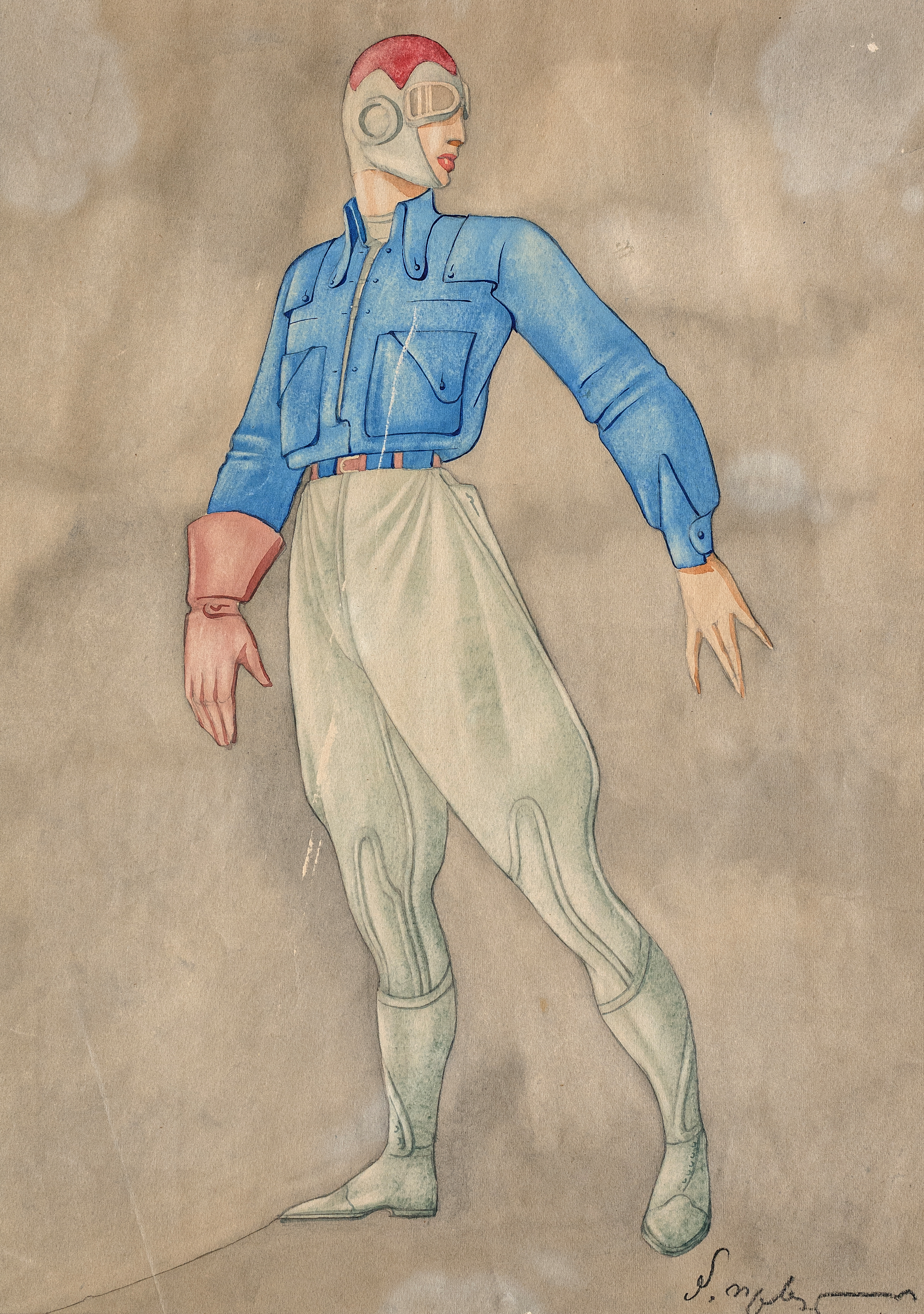
Petre Otskheli Costume of the aviator for the leo Esakia movie 'Winged Painter' 1936

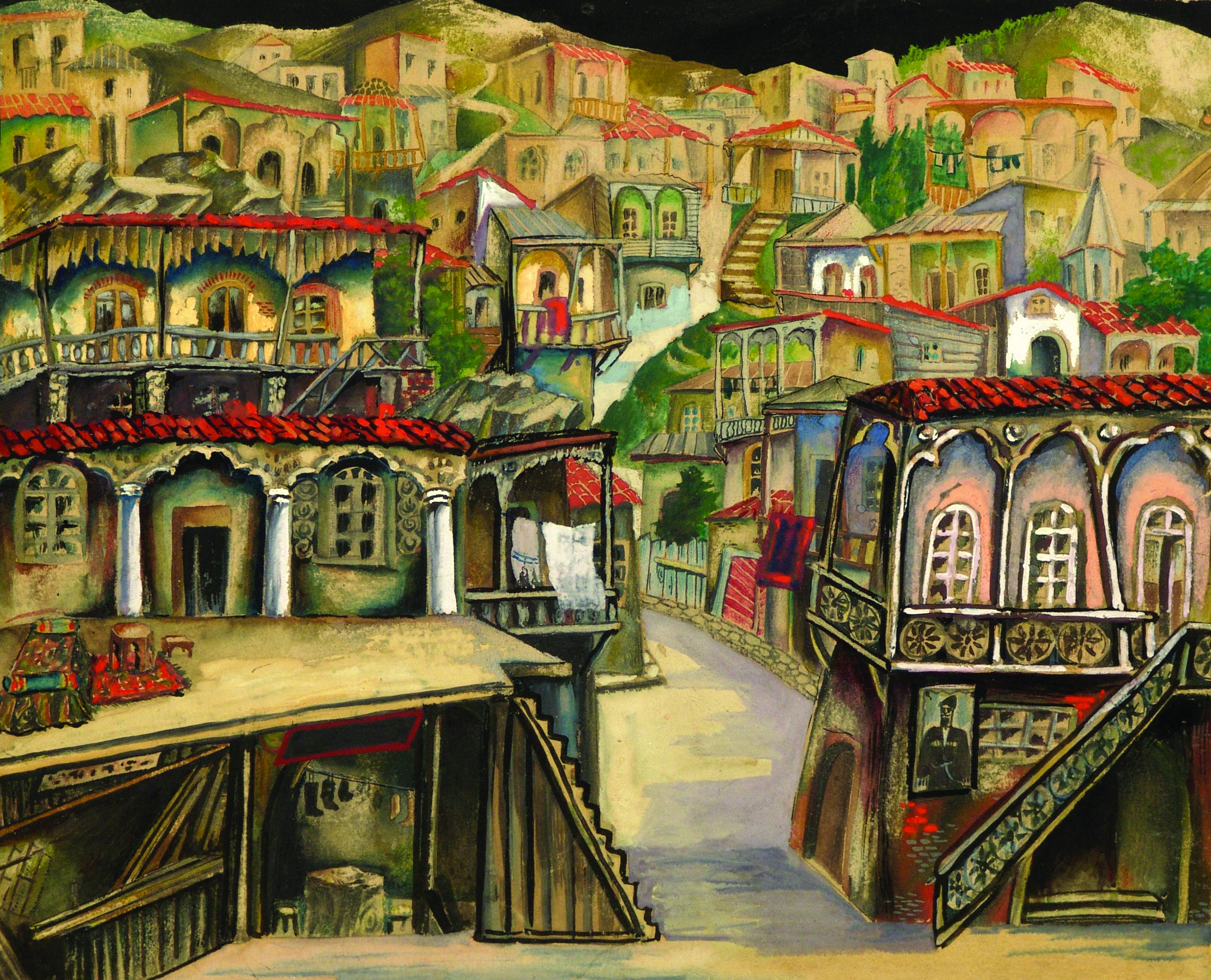
Decoration sketch for the play 'Solar Eclipse in Georgia (1932) by Elene Akhvlediani

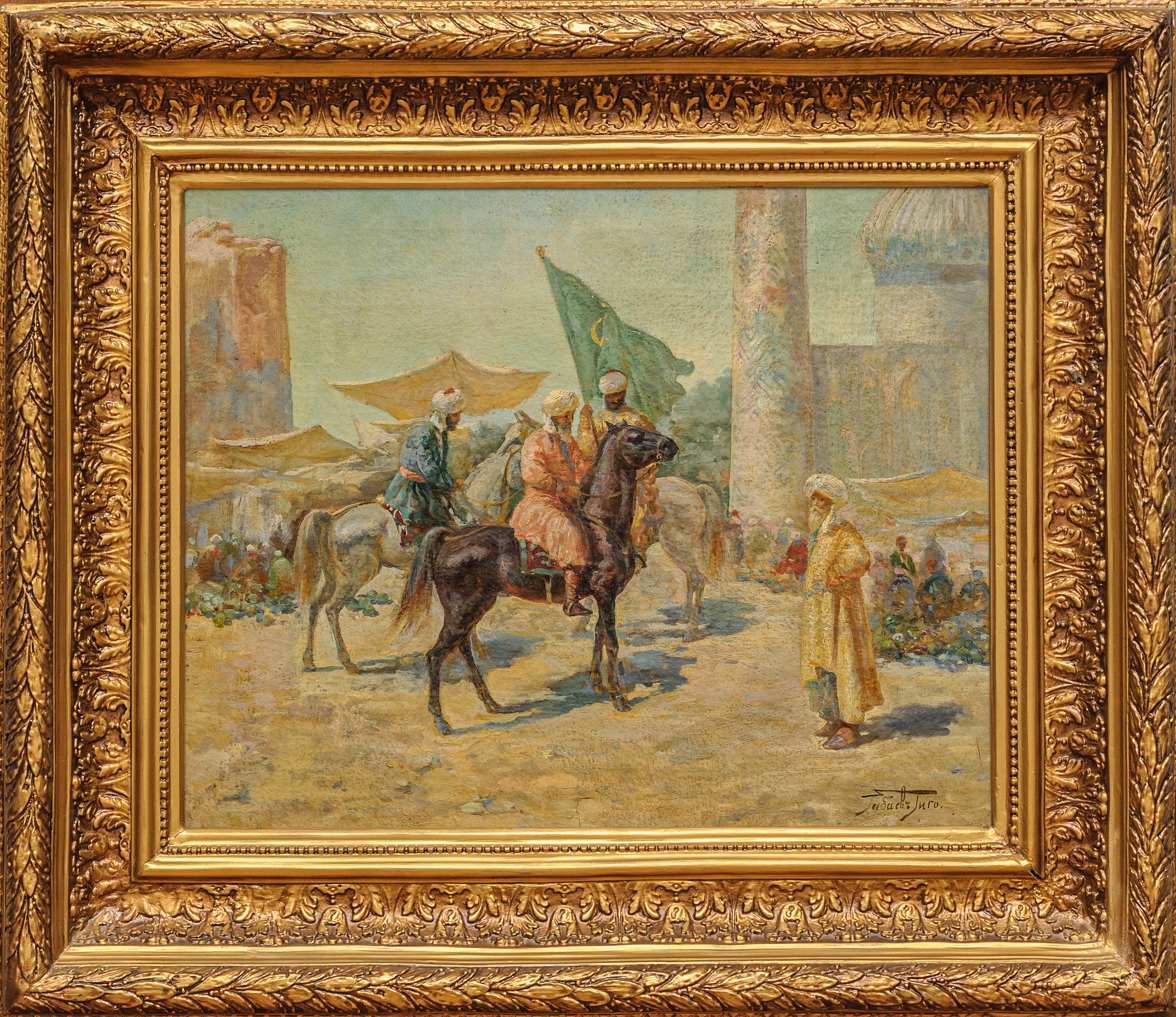
Pilgrims from Samarkand' by Gigo Gabashvili (1891 - 1894) by Gigo Gabashvili

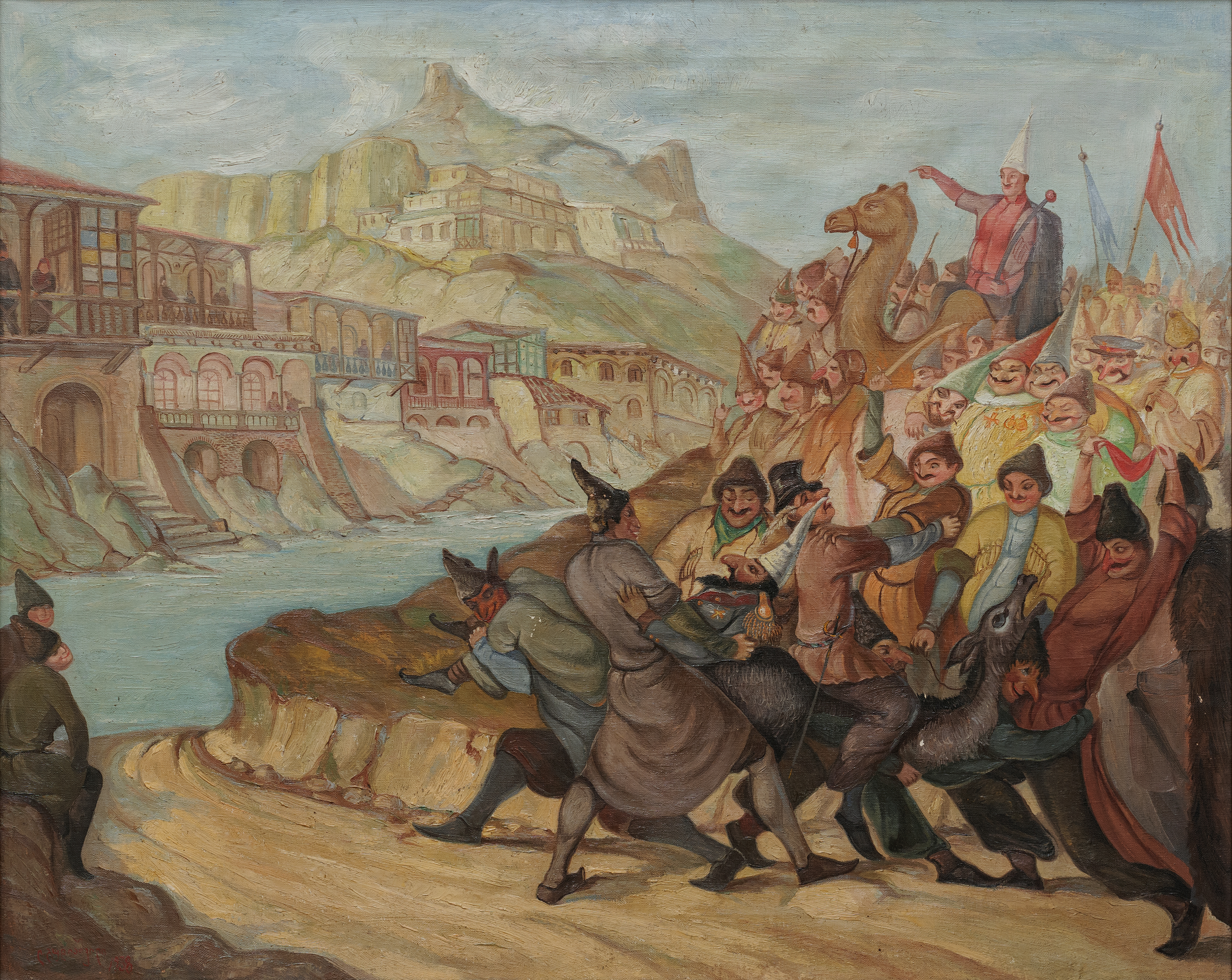
The Khan Thrown in the River' Kura by Lado Gudiashvili (1938) by Lado Gudiashvili

== Collection of Russian Fine Arts ==
Besides Georgian artists, the collection also contains works of Russian painters as well as works of representatives of Russian Silver age World of Art Konstantin Korovin, Lev Bakst, Alexander Benua, Alexander Golovin and Viktor Simov. The union was founded in the beginning of 20th century in St. Peters-burg.

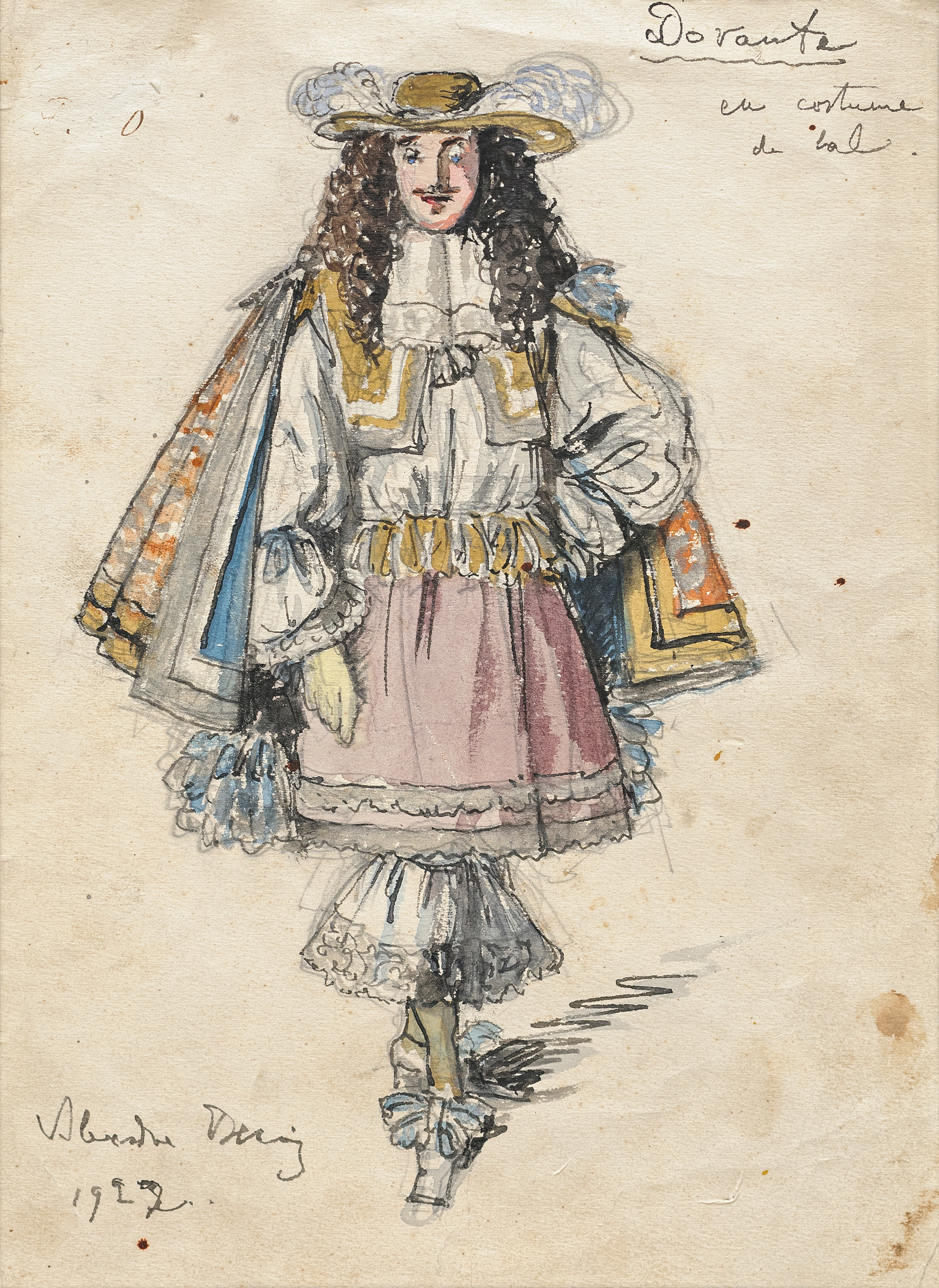
Aleksander Benua Costume for the Molière Play 'The Burgeois Gentleman' 1922

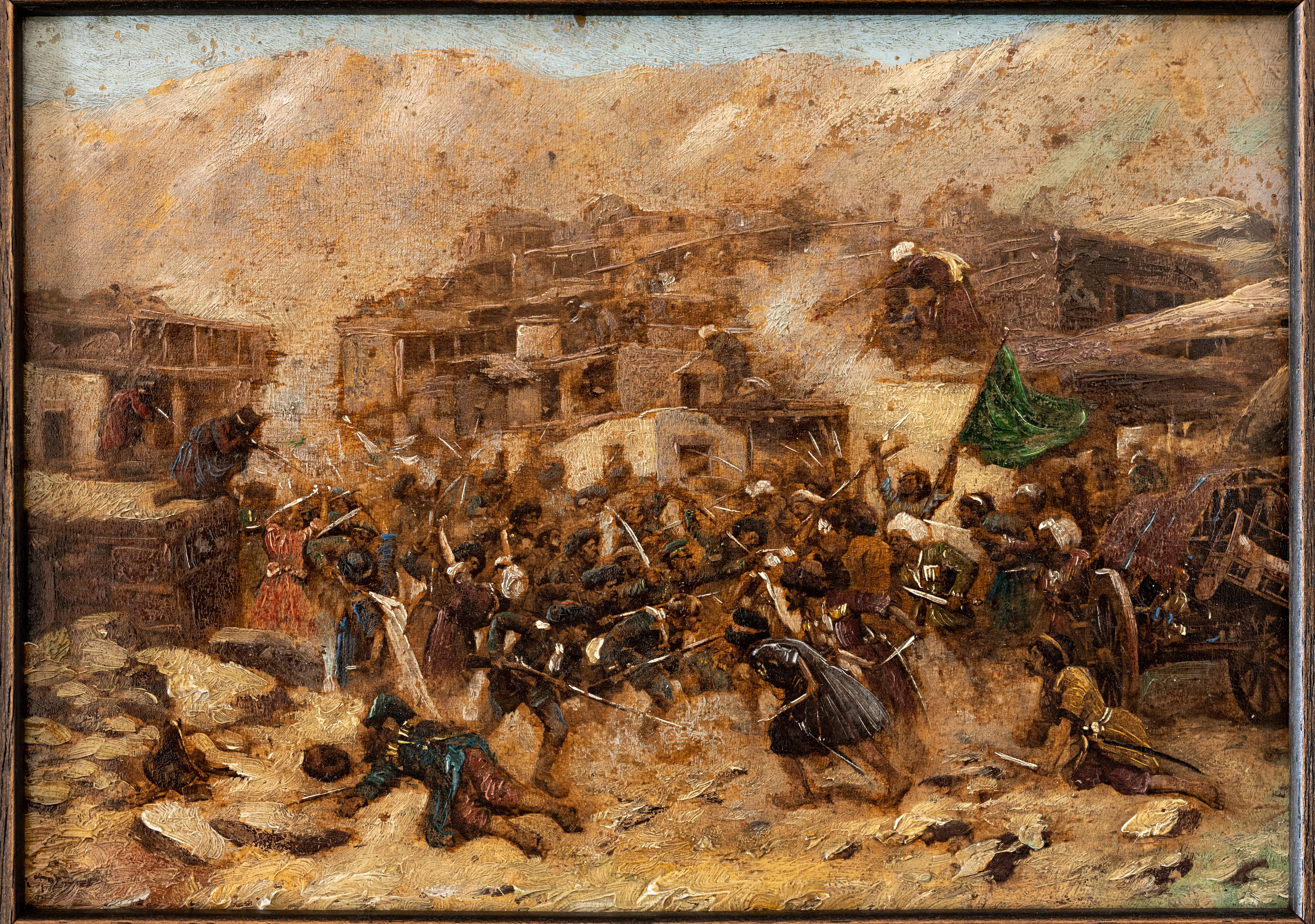
Capturing of Aul Franz Rubua 1856-1928

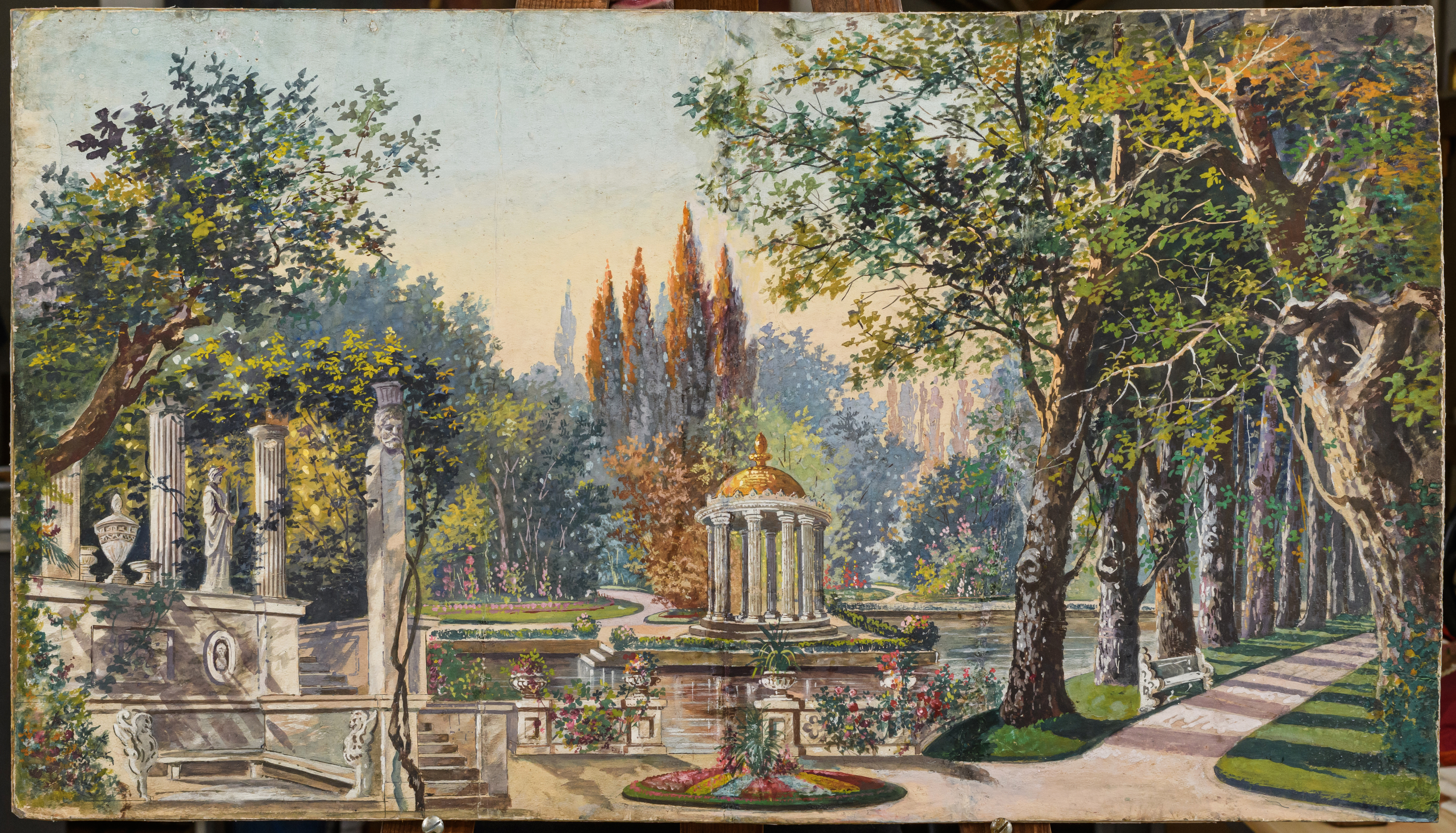
Depiction of Nikipore Kulesh. (1902 - 1920) by Nikipore Kulesh

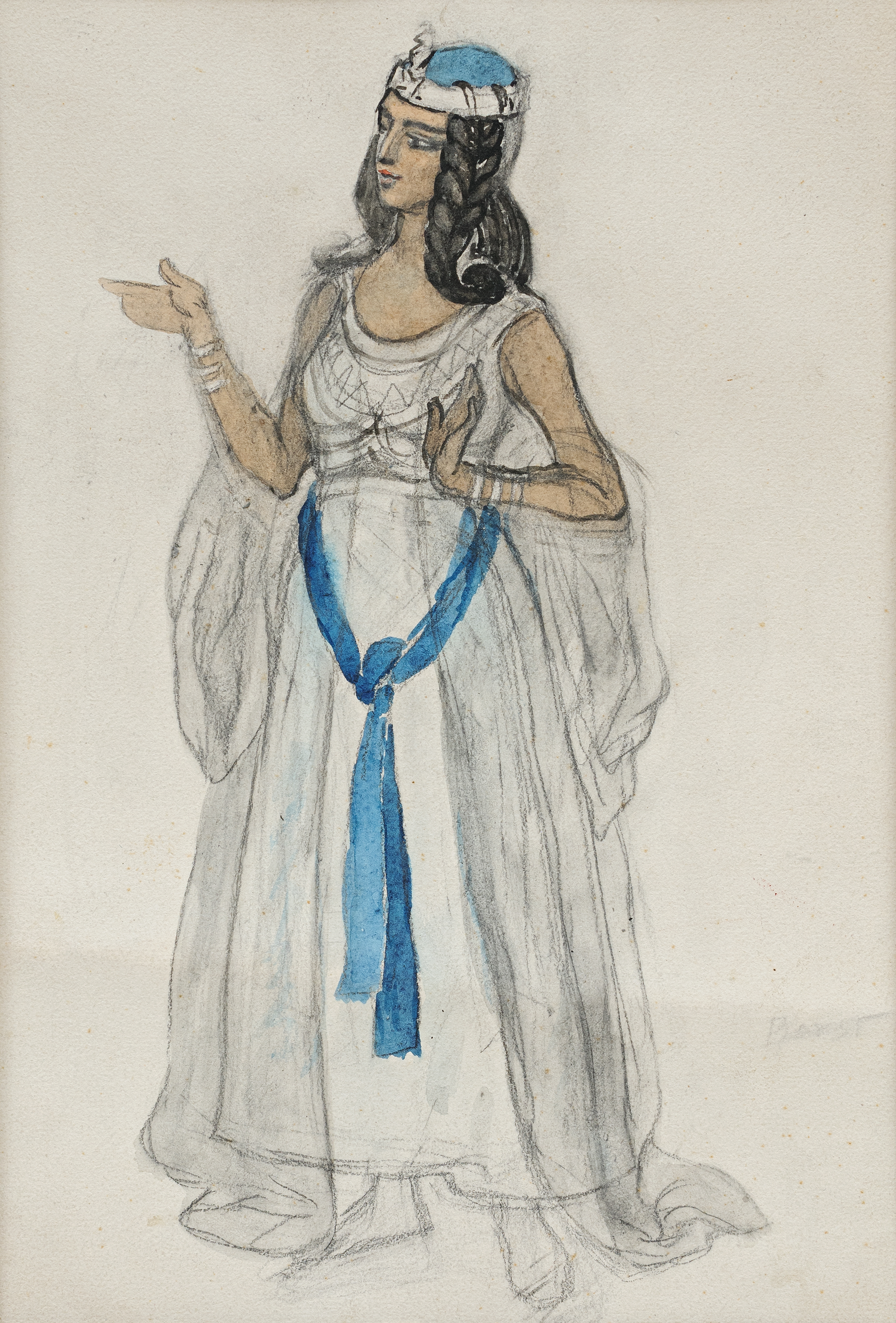
Lev Bakst Ida Rubenstein (1883-1960) as Cleopatra

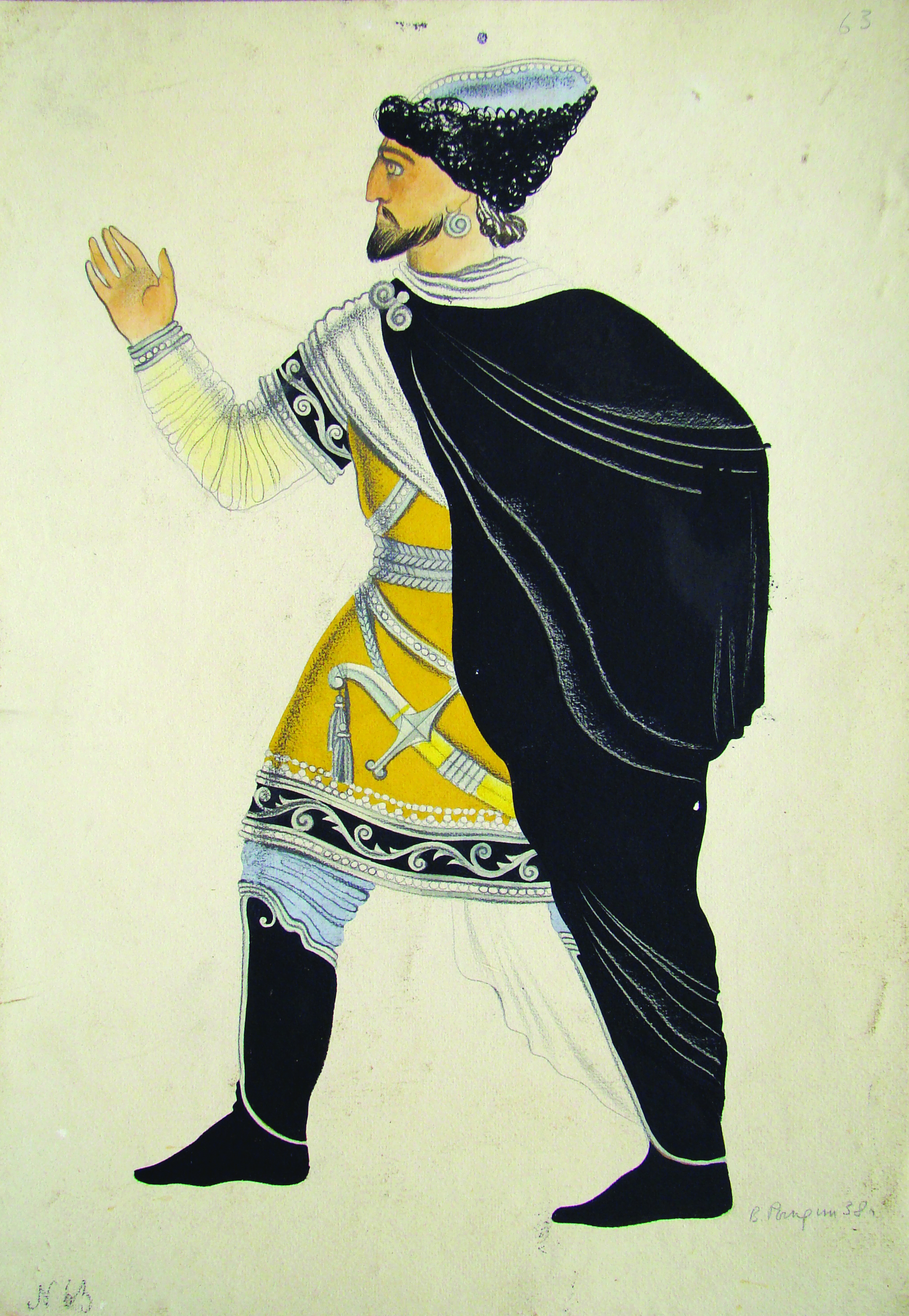
Vadim Rindin (1902-1974) Costume for the Zakaria Paliashvili opera 'Abesalom and Eter'

== Collection of Western European Fine Arts ==
Interest in European art has existed in Georgia since ancient times. Precisely, Western European art became popular in Georgia in 18th century. Representatives of Georgian nobility traveled to Europe frequently and tried to bring the culture, art and traditions back in homeland.

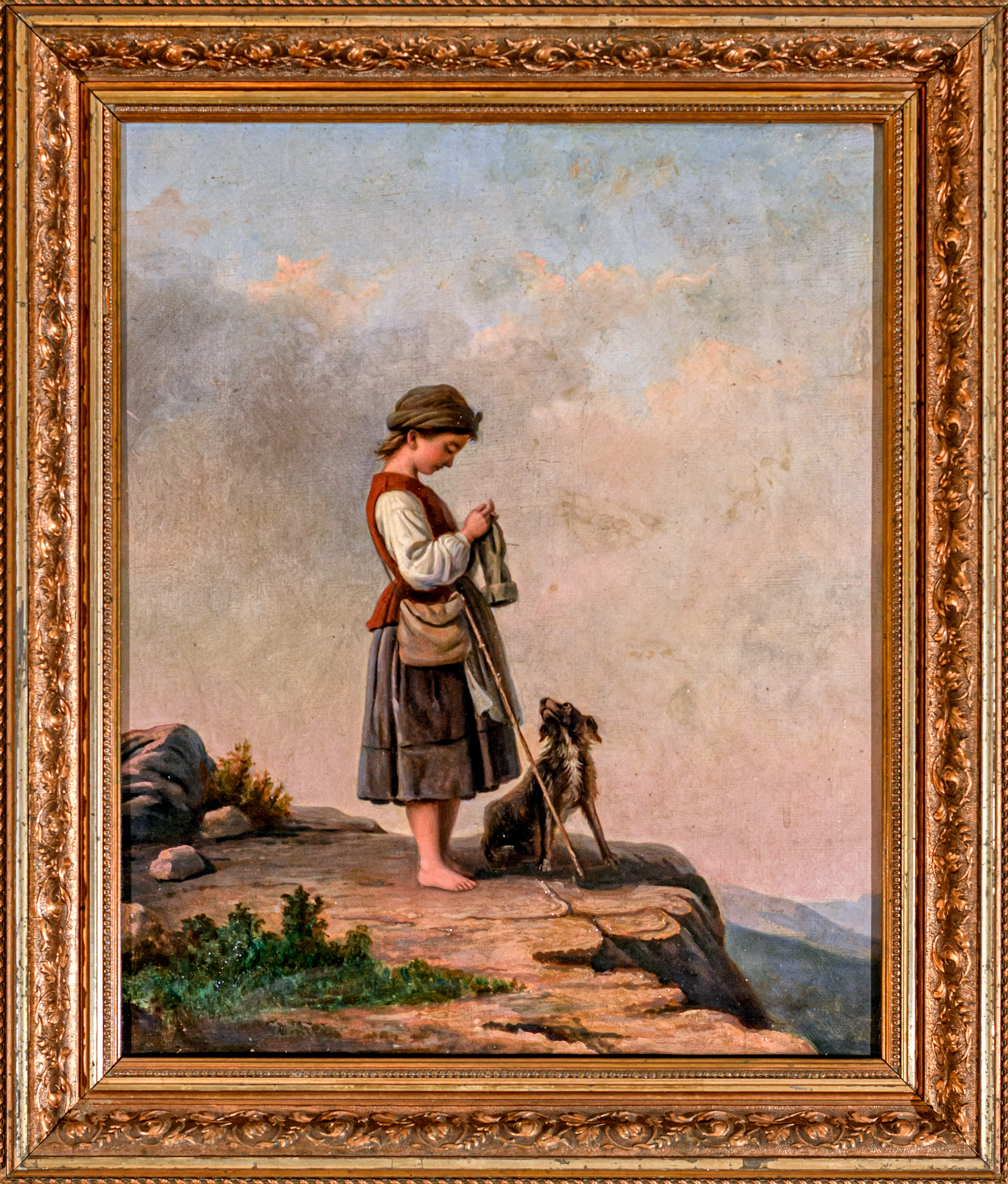
A Girl with a Dog (1800-1850) By unknown

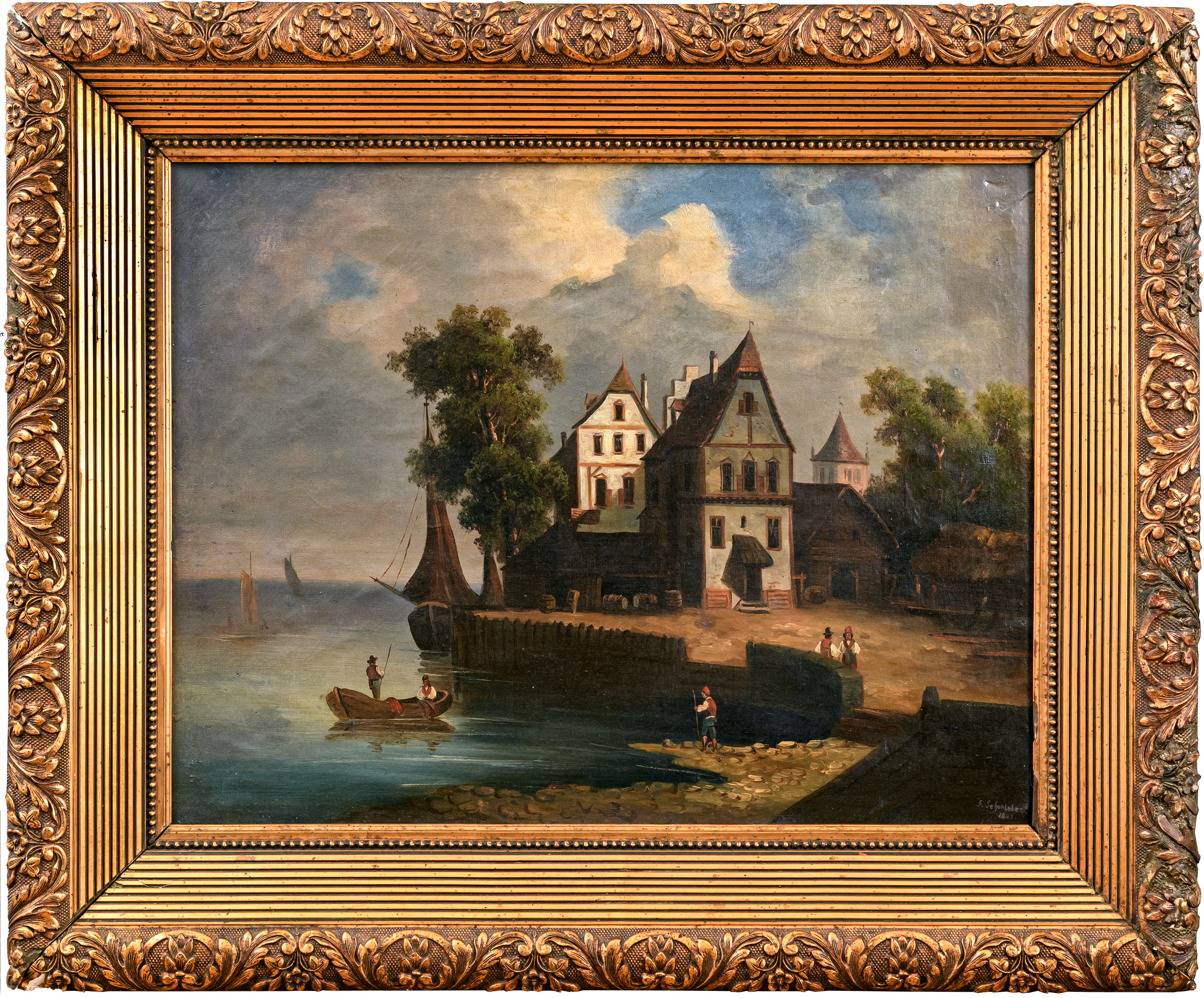
Houses Near Bay (1882) by Gustav Schonleber

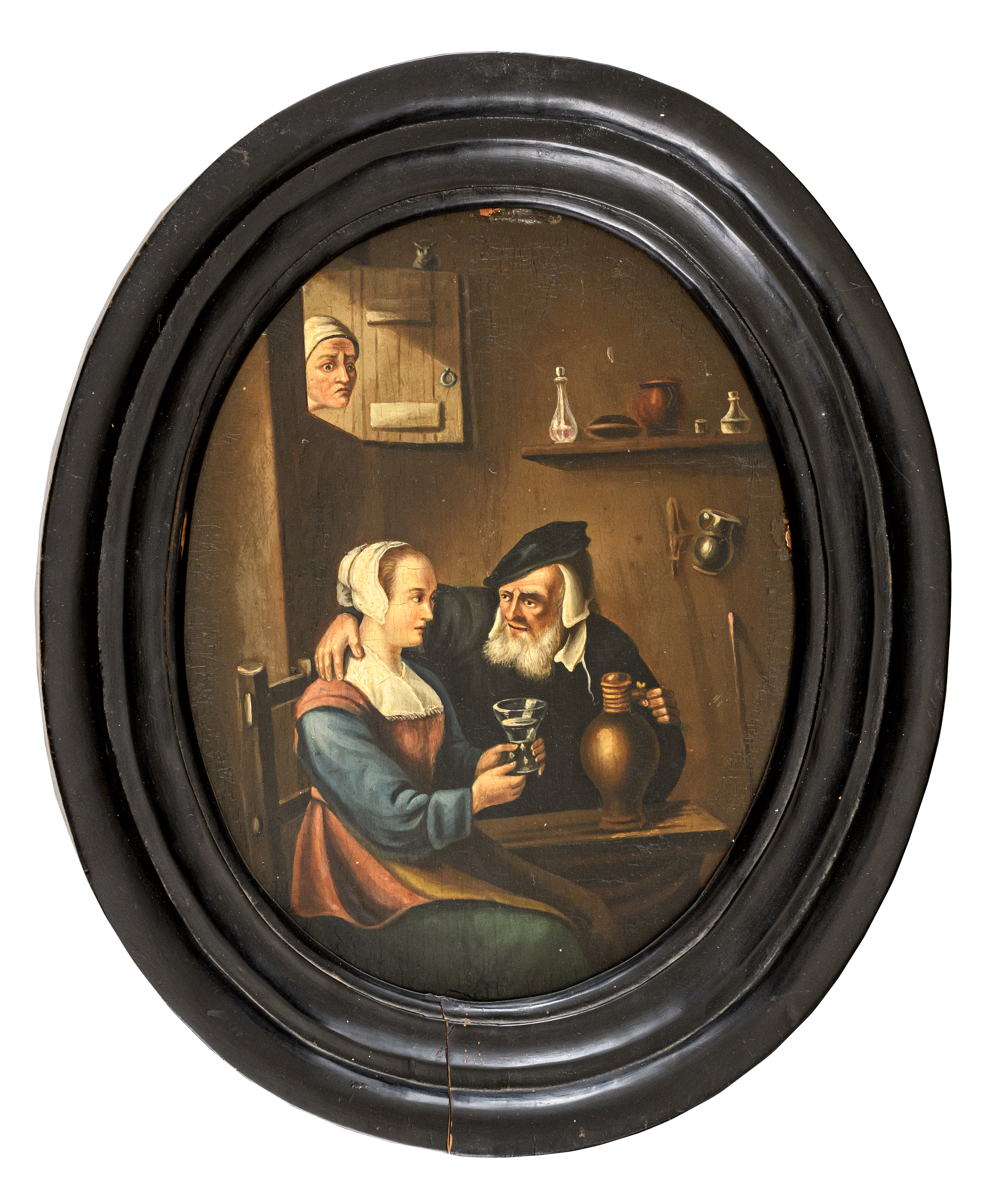
Jealous Wife (1610-1690) by unknown

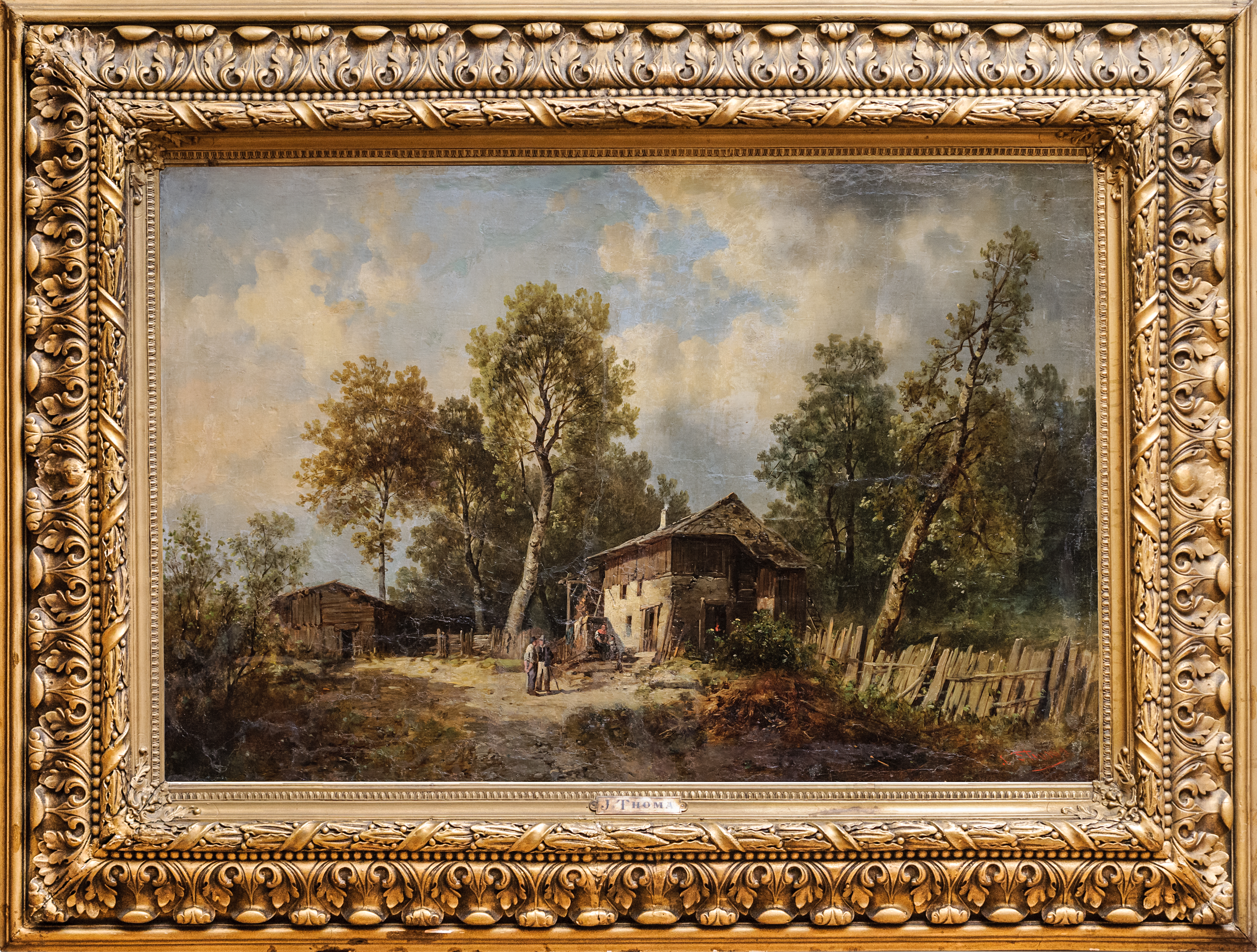
Landscape by Josef Thoma (1865)

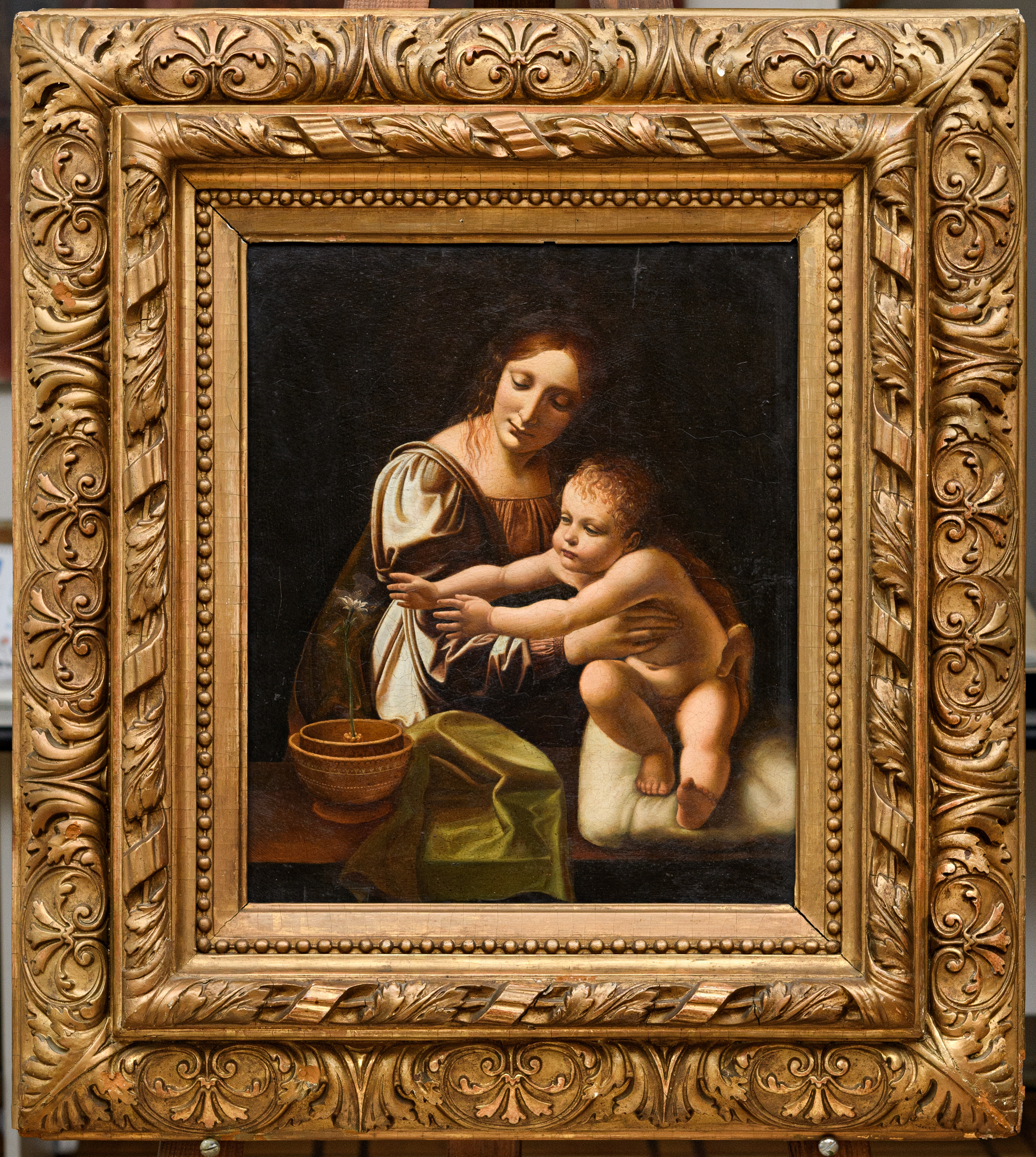
Unknown Painter. Leonardo da Vinci school (XVII C.) Virgin Mary with Child. Based on work of Giovanni Boltraffio

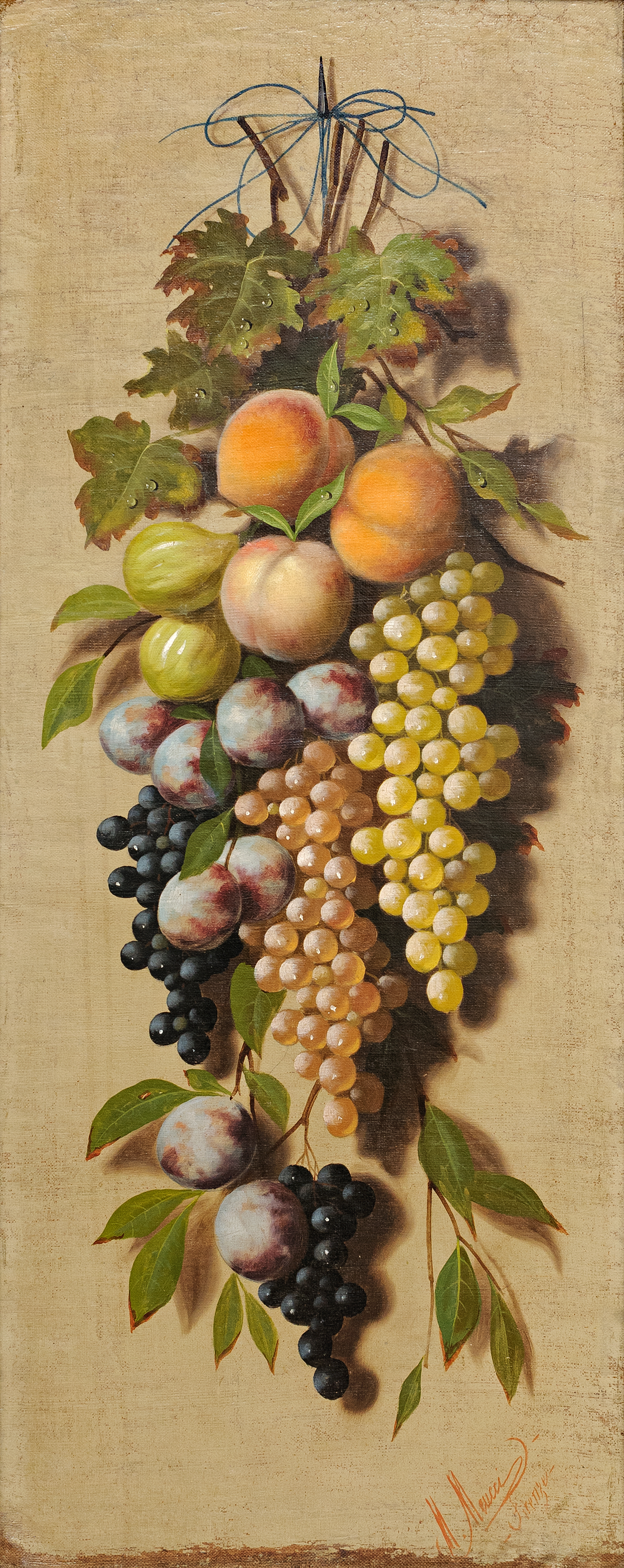
Still Life by Michelangelo Meucci (1890)

== Collection of Persian Fine Arts ==
The Art Palace also owns collection of Persian Fine Arts. Collection consists of 4 Qajar miniature Paintings dated back to XIX Century and also painting of King Solomon. As in Jewish and Christian traditions, Islam promotes the ancient King Solomon as a model ruler; wise and just.

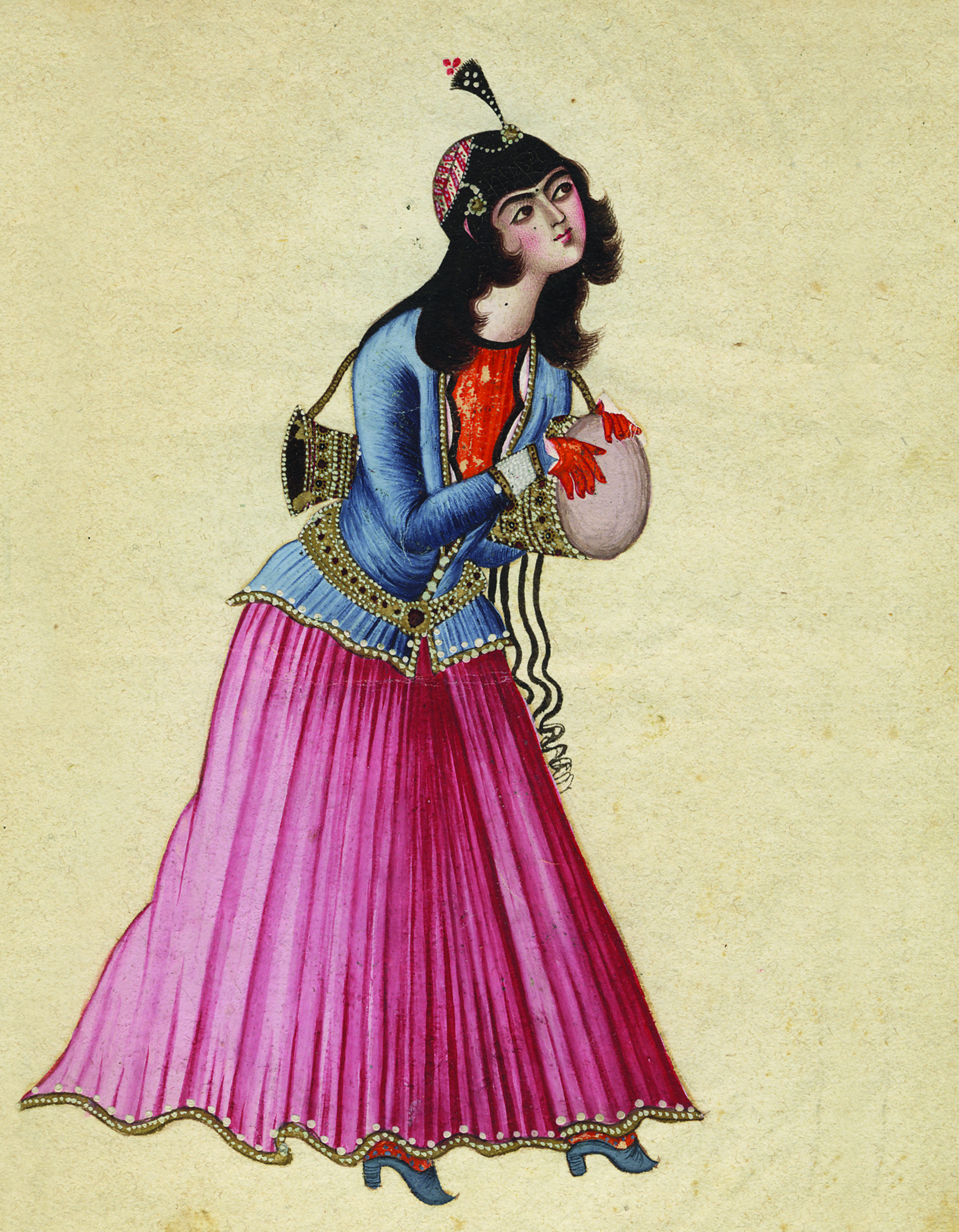
Qajar Miniature (1800 - 1850). Zarb

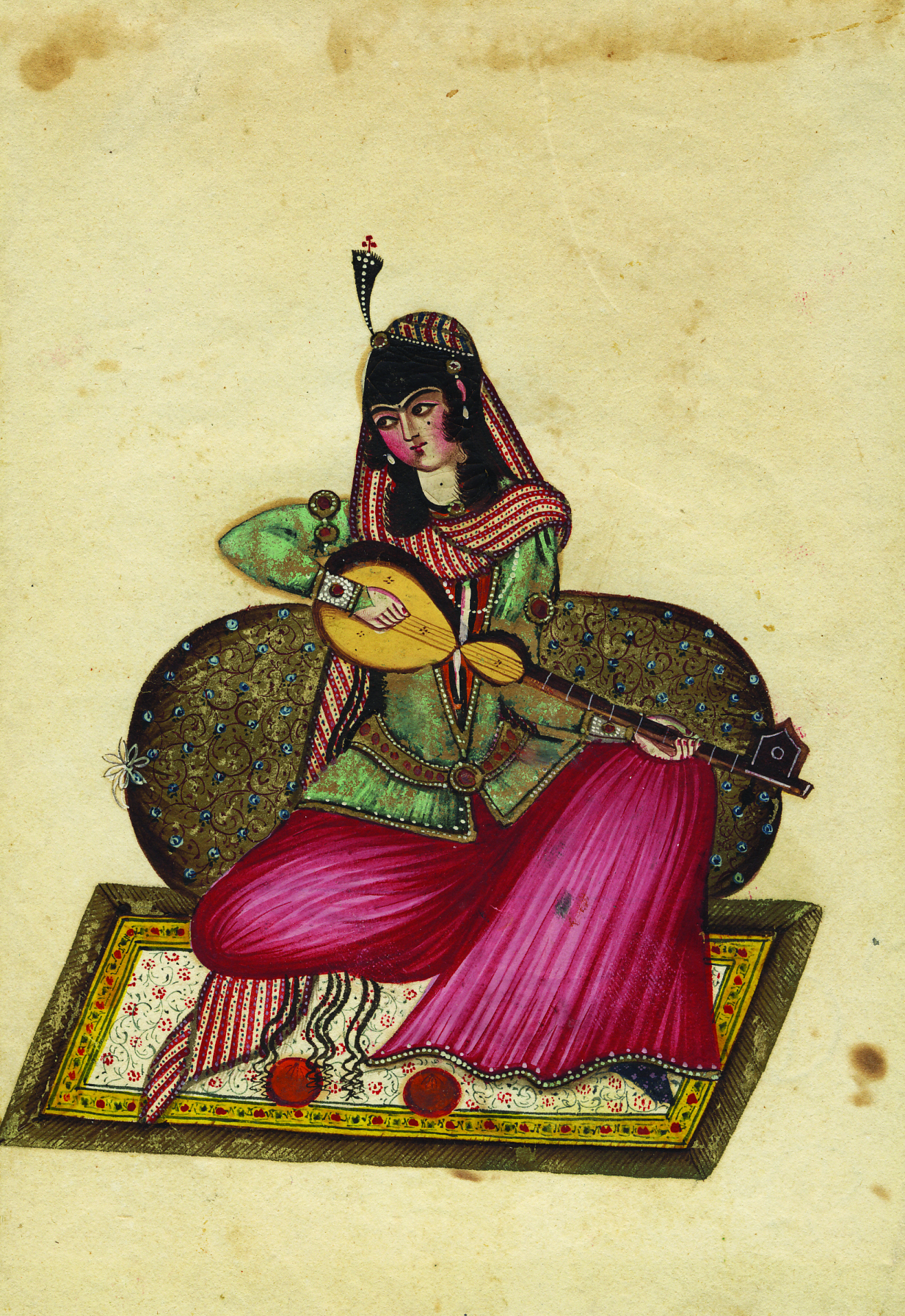
Qajar Miniature (1800 - 1850). Tar

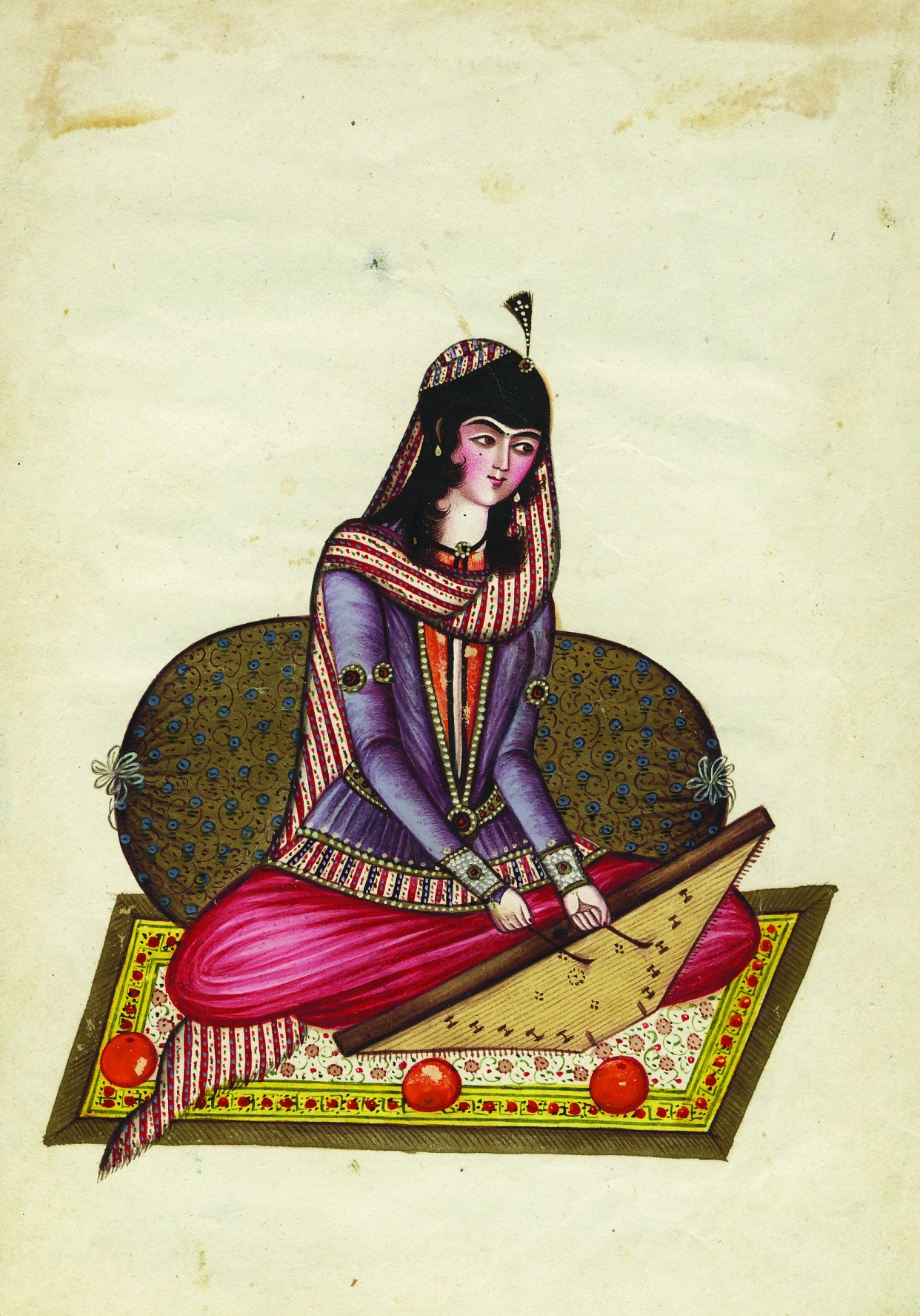
Qajar Miniature (1800 - 1850). Santur

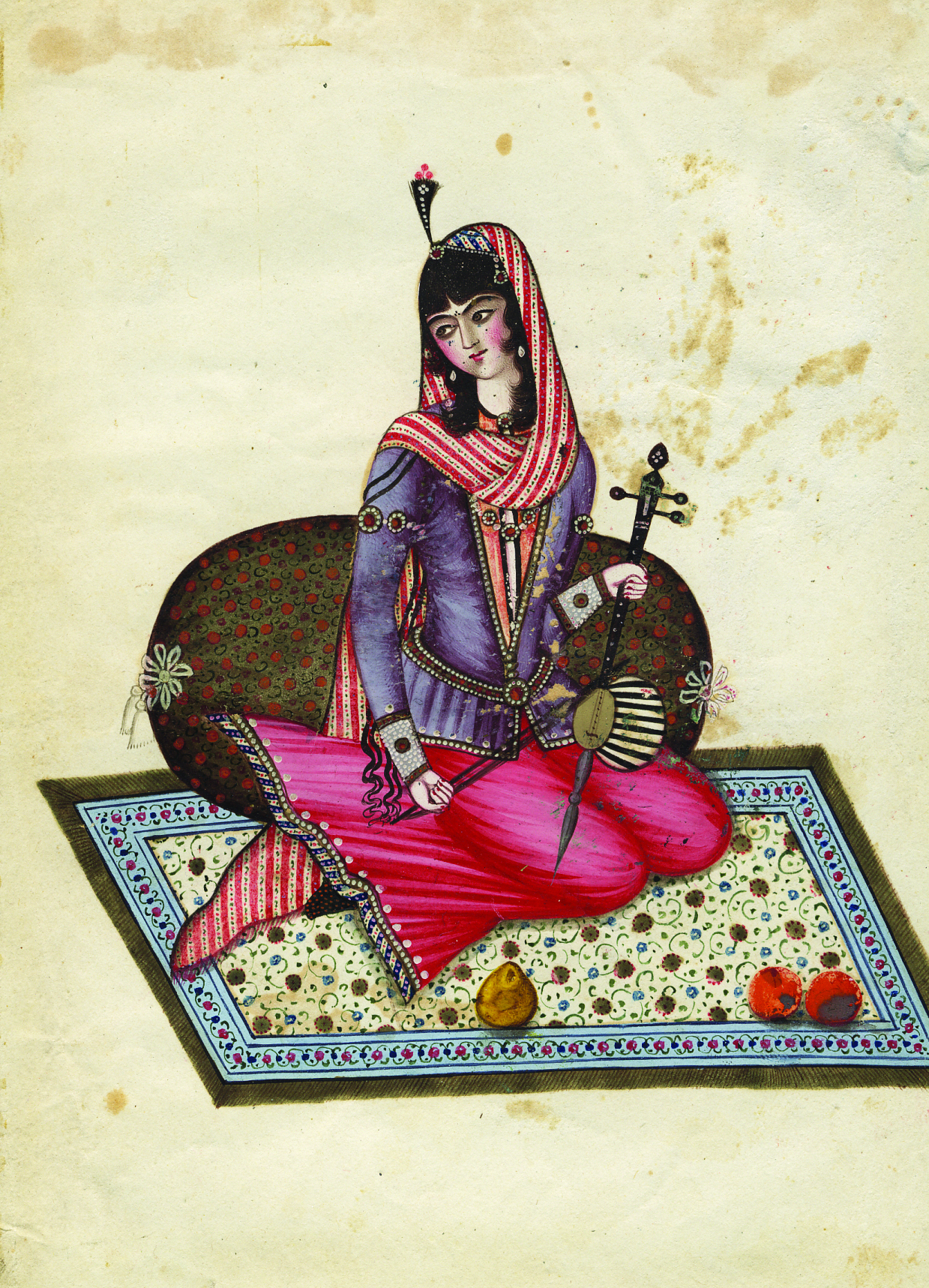
Qajar Miniature (1800 - 1850). Kamancheh

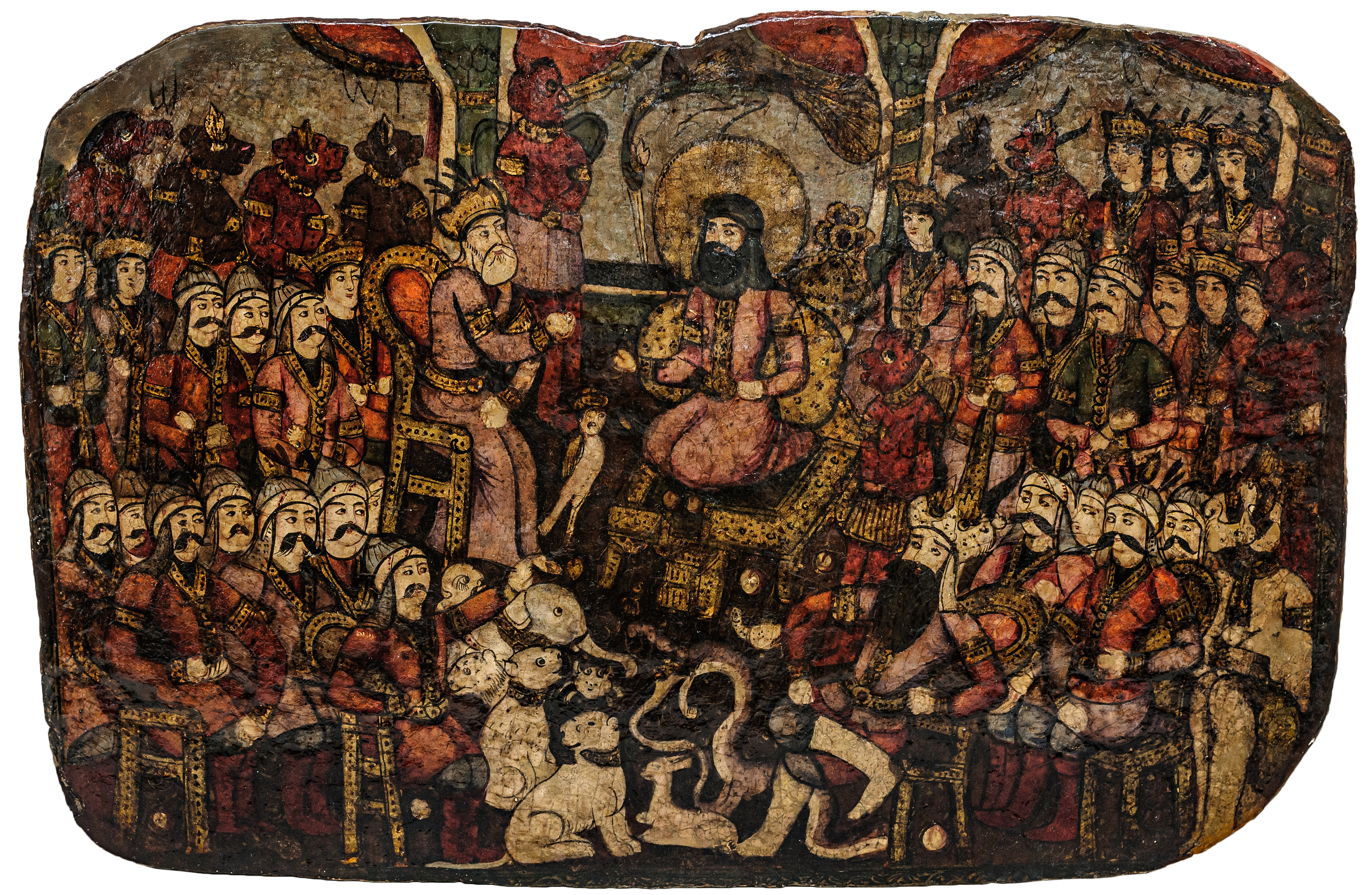
King Solomon and his Court (late 19 century) by Unknown
