= Countess Alexandra von Zarnekau =

Countess Alexandra Constantinovna
- Princess George Alexandrovich Yuryevsky
- Born: 10 May 1883; Kutaisi, Kutais Governorate, Russian Empire
- Died: 28 May 1957 (aged 74); Paris, France
- Burial: Sainte-Geneviève-des-Bois Russian Cemetery
- Spouse: Prince George Alexandrovich Yuryevsky (m. 1900; div. 1908) Lev Vassilievich Naryshkin (m. 1908)
- Issue: Prince Alexander Georgievich Yuryevsky
- House: Holstein-Gottorp
- Father: Duke Constantine Petrovich of Oldenburg
- Mother: Agrippina Japaridze

Countess Alexandra Constantinovna von Zarnekau (Russian: графиня Александра Константиновна Зарнекау, 10 May [O.S. 28 April] 1883 – 28 May 1957) was the eldest daughter of Duke Constantine Petrovich of Oldenburg and his Georgian wife, Agrippina Japaridze, titled Countess von Zarnekau and formerly married to a Georgian prince (Tariel Dadiani).

== Marriages and death ==
At age 16, on 16 February 1900, Countess Alexandra married Prince George Alexandrovich Yuryevsky, the son of Tsar Alexander II and his mistress (and later wife), Ekaterina Mikhailovna Dolgorukova, the Princess Yourievskya, at Nice, France. They had one child, Prince Alexander Georgievich Yourievsky, who was born on 21 December 1900. They divorced in 1908.

Countess Alexandra married secondly to Lev Vassilievich Naryshkin on 17 October 1908 at Paris, France. During World War I, Countess Alexandra worked as an administrator of the Russian hospital at Saloniki. After the war, she moved in Paris, France, where she died on 28 May 1957.

== Bibliography ==
- Debrett's Peerage, Baronetage, Knightage and Companionage, Kelly's Directories 1963, p. 19
- Arnold McNaughton, The Book of Kings: A Royal Genealogy, Vol. 1, Garnstone Press 1973, pp. 216, 311
- Hugh Montgomery-Massingberd, Burke's Royal Families of the World, Vol. 1, Burke's Peerage 1977
- "Aleksandra Konstantinovna von Zarnekau, Countess von Zarnekau" at The Peerage
- Edvard Radzinsky and Antonina Bouis, Alexander II: The Last Great Tsar, Simon & Schuster 2006
- Alexandre Tarsaidze, Katia: Wife Before God, Macmillan 1970, p. 287
- John Van Der Kiste, The Romanovs, 1818 - 1959: Alexander II of Russia and His Family, Sutton Publications 1998, p. 215 [illus. Family Tree]
