= History of Russia (1855–1894) =

The Russian Empire in 1866

In 1855, Alexander II began his reign as Tsar of the Russian Empire and presided over a period of political and social reform, notably the emancipation of serfs in 1861 and the lifting of censorship. His successor Alexander III (r. 1881–1894) pursued a policy of repression and restricted public expenditure, but continued land and labour reforms. This was a period of population growth and significant industrialization, though Russia remained a largely rural country.

Political movements of the time included the Populists (Narodniki), anarchists and Marxists. A revolutionary organization called People's Will (Narodnaya Volya) assassinated Alexander II. Another current of thought was embodied in the Slavophiles, who opposed modernization and Westernization.

Russia continued to expand its empire, occupying the Caucasus, Tashkent and Samarkand. In foreign affairs, the period began with the conclusion of the Crimean War. Russian policy brought it into conflict with other European powers, in particular Austria-Hungary, as it sought to extend influence over the European portions of the receding Ottoman Empire and regain naval access to the Black Sea. This culminated in a successful war with the Ottoman Empire in 1877–1878, followed by the Treaty of San Stefano and Congress of Berlin in 1878 by which an independent Bulgaria came into being and by acquisition of former Ottoman territories in the South Caucasus. Russia joined Germany and Austria-Hungary in the League of the Three Emperors, but friction continued with both partners over Bulgaria. The alliance with Germany came to an end in 1890.

== Economic development ==
Russia's population growth rate from 1850 to 1910 was the fastest of all the major powers except for the United States. Between 1850 and 1900, Russia's population doubled, but it remained chiefly rural well into the twentieth century.

The proclamation law of 1861 freed the peasants from dependence on the landowners and granted them all the land, previously worked by the peasants for their own use. Agriculture remained in the hands of peasants, who together constituted about four-fifths of the rural population, and former landowners. By the end of 19th century, Russia was the largest producer and exporter of cereals in the world. Owing to the development of agriculture, Russia gradually assumed a more important position in the world trade.

Industrial growth was significant, although unsteady, and in absolute terms it was not extensive. Russia's industrial regions included Moscow, the central regions of European Russia, Saint Petersburg, the Baltic cities, Russian Poland, some areas along the lower Don and Dnepr rivers, and the southern Ural Mountains. By 1890 Russia had about 32,000 kilometers of railroads and 1.4 million factory workers, most of whom worked in the textile industry. Between 1860 and 1890, annual coal production had grown about 1,200 percent to over 6.8 million tons, and iron and steel production had more than doubled to 2 million tons per year. The state budget had more than doubled, however, and debt expenditures had quadrupled, constituting 28 percent of official expenditures in 1891.

== Reforms and their limits ==
Tsar Alexander II, who succeeded Nicholas I in 1855, was a man of a liberal disposition, who saw no alternative but to implement change in the aftermath of the Disastrous performance of the Army, the economy and the government during Crimean War. Alexander initiated substantial reforms in education, the government, the judiciary, and the military.

In 1861 he proclaimed the emancipation of 20 million privately held serfs.The emancipation reform granted former serfs personal freedom and introduced provisions for acquiring land, although communal controls continued to restrict peasant mobility. Local commissions effected emancipation by giving land and freedom to the serfs. The land allotted to the peasants was bought from the owners with the State's assistance. The government issued bonds to the landowners for this purpose and collected redemption payments from the peasants at the rate of 5% of the total cost yearly. The government had envisioned that the 50,000 former landlords who possessed estates of more than 1.1 km would thrive without serfs and would continue to provide loyal political and administrative leadership in the countryside. The government also had expected that peasants would produce sufficient crops for their own consumption and for export sales, thereby helping to finance most of the government's expenses, imports, and foreign debt.

Reforms of local government closely followed emancipation. In 1864 most local government in the European part of Russia was organized into provincial and district elected self-government (zemstvos), which were made up of representatives of all classes and were responsible for local schools, public health, roads, prisons, food supply, and other concerns. In 1870 elected city councils, or duma, were formed. Dominated by property owners and constrained by provincial governors and the police, the zemstva and duma raised taxes and levied labor to support their activities.

In 1864 Alexander II implemented the great judicial reform. In major towns, it established courts with juries. In general, the judicial system functioned effectively, but the government lacked the finances and cultural influence to extend the court system to the villages, where traditional peasant justice continued to operate with minimal interference from provincial officials. The Russian judicial system was modelled after contemporary French and German law. Each case had to be decided on its merits and not on precedents. This approach remained in place ever since.

Other major reforms took place in the educational and cultural spheres. Censorship, which had stifled opinion under Nicholas, was greatly relaxed, and public opinion found a voice. This greatly facilitated the government's effort to eradicate corruption, red tape and inefficiency. Universities had gained autonomy. The Government encouraged education: it was during Alexander's reign that the education of the peasant masses started on a vast scale. The central government attempted to act through the zemstva to establish uniform curricula for elementary schools.

In the financial sphere, Russia established the State Bank in 1866, which put the national currency on a firmer footing. The Ministry of Finance supported railroad development, which facilitated vital export activity, but it was cautious and moderate in its foreign ventures. The ministry also founded the Peasant Land Bank in 1882 to enable enterprising farmers to acquire more land. The Ministry of Internal Affairs countered this policy, however, by establishing the Nobles' Land Bank in 1885 to forestall foreclosures of mortgages.

The reform of the military service (1874) was the last of the principal reforms in Alexander's II reign. The Franco-Prussian War demonstrated the necessity of building a modern army. The old system of long term service (25 years) for a limited number of recruits was abandoned, as being too heavy a burden for the people and as providing practically no reserves. The new conscription system, which provided for a short term of active service followed by several years in the reserve, was introduced by Dmitry Milyutin in 1874. It was drawn on democratic lines, calling to the colours all young men of 21 without distinction of class. Exemption was only granted to young men who were the sole breadwinners of their families. It also gave the army a role in teaching many peasants to read and in pioneering medical education for women.

Alexander's far reaching policy, however, did not bring political peace to Russia. In 1881 revolutionaries assassinated Alexander II.

His son Alexander III (r. 1881–1894) initiated a period of political counterreform. He strengthened the security police, reorganizing it into an agency known as the Okhrana, gave it extraordinary powers, and placed it under the Ministry of Internal Affairs. Dmitriy Tolstoy, Alexander's minister of internal affairs, instituted the use of land captains, who were noble overseers of districts, and he restricted the power of the zemstvos and the dumas. Alexander III assigned his former tutor, conservative Konstantin Pobedonostsev, to be the procurator of the Holy Synod of the Orthodox Church and Ivan Delyanov to be the minister of education. In their attempts to "save" Russia from "modernism," they revived religious censorship, persecuted non-Orthodox and non-Russian populations, fostered anti-Semitism, and suppressed the autonomy of the universities. Their attacks on liberal and non-Russian elements alienated large segments of the population. The nationalities, particularly Poles, Finns, Latvians, Lithuanians, and Ukrainians, reacted to the regime's efforts to Russify them by intensifying their own nationalism. Many Jews emigrated or joined radical movements. Secret organizations and political movements continued to develop despite the regime's efforts to quell them.

Alexander III put strict economizing into practice; the civil list of the Imperial family was reduced, and estimates for the army, navy and civil service were cut down considerably. This allowed the introduction of a series of financial reforms which tended to ameliorate the condition of the peasantry: the poll tax was abolished in 1886, a law was passed to accelerate legal transfer of the land allotted to the peasants in 1861, the payments due from them for this land were greatly reduced, Crown lands were made available for leasing or purchase to the peasants on advantageous terms, and great stretches of Crown lands in Eastern Russia and Siberia were opened for peasant emigration and resettlement.

Labour legislation was first introduced in 1882 with the creation of the inspectorate of factories (in charge of health and life saving regulations), the regulation of working hours and the limitation of female and juvenile labor.

Alexander's financial reforms prepared the way for the introduction of gold standard, which was carried out in the first years of his successor's reign (1897). He also continued a policy of intensive railway building. Here the greatest event was the laying down of the Trans-Siberian Railway in 1891.

During the second half of the 19th century, a faction of so-called "Slavophiles" emerged in intellectual circles. They were convinced that Peter the Great had made a mistake in trying to modernize and Westernize the country and that Russia's salvation lay in the rejection of Western ideas. Slavophiles believed that while the West polluted itself with science, atheism, materialism, and wealth, they should return to a simple peasant-based society centered on the Orthodox faith. The government rejected these ideas since it felt the need for rapid modernization.

It followed that Russia, despite being a polyglot empire with dozens of nationalities and languages, was anything but friendly to the nationalistic aspirations of minorities. Poles fared especially badly since they had been enemies for centuries and because they had revolted in 1830 and 1863. As Russian industrialization progressed, Poland fared quite well, but other areas like Ukraine remained backward, a problem worsened by the clumsy land reforms of Alexander II. Jews in Russia proper and Ukraine were subject to bad (and worsening) discrimination, especially since they were associated with either Poles or with revolutionary movements. Most of the latter were also highly nationalistic and oblivious to the minority problem. Even the Bolsheviks were clueless until after they had taken power in 1917.

Despite industrialization, Russia was still overwhelmingly rural and backward at the start of World War I. Moscow and Saint Petersburg were the only cities with any significant industry. Since most workers were fresh off the farm and totally uneducated, the main impetus of revolution came from middle-class college graduates frustrated at the inefficiency of Russian society.

Thus (with heavy foreign investment and technical assistance), Russia managed to achieve at least a veneer of industrialization by 1914. Along with this came all of the abuses already encountered in the West such as child labor and unsafe working conditions. But while Britain, the US, Germany, and others were eventually able to rid themselves of those problems, Russia found it much more difficult due to inadequate infrastructure and (especially) the lack of an honest, educated bureaucracy. During the latter years of the 19th century, revolutionary groups of all flavors proliferated, some of which sought to reject modernity altogether and turn the clock back to the Middle Ages.

== Foreign affairs after the Crimean War ==
After the Crimean War, Russia pursued cautious and well-calculated foreign policies. Russia was hurt by the Treaty of Paris (1856), which had demilitarized the Black Sea and deprived Russia of the southern strip of Bessarabia, which controlled access to the Danube River. The treaty gave the West European powers, not Russia, the duty of protecting Christians living in the Ottoman Empire. The first phase of Alexander II's foreign policy had the primary goal of regaining Russian naval access to the Black Sea. Russian statesmen viewed Britain and Austria (redesignated as Austria-Hungary in 1867) as opposed to that goal, so foreign policy concentrated on good relations with France, Prussia, and the United States.

Following the Crimean War, Russia revived its expansionist policies. Russian troops first moved to gain control of the Caucasus region, where the revolts of Muslim tribesmen—Chechens, Circassians, and Dagestanis—had continued despite numerous Russian campaigns in the nineteenth century. Once the forces of Aleksandr Baryatinsky had captured the legendary Chechen rebel leader Shamil in 1859, the army resumed the expansion into Central Asia that had begun under Nicholas I. The capture of Tashkent was a significant victory over the Kokand Khanate, part of which was annexed in 1866. By 1867 Russian forces had captured enough territory to form the Guberniya (Governorate General) of Turkestan, the capital of which was Tashkent. The Bukhara Khanate then lost the crucial Samarkand area to Russian forces in 1868. To avoid alarming Britain, which had strong interests in protecting nearby India, Russia left the Bukhoran territories directly bordering Afghanistan and Persia nominally independent. The Central Asian khanates retained a degree of autonomy until 1917.

Russia followed the United States, Britain, and France in establishing relations with Japan, and, together with Britain and France, Russia obtained concessions from China consequent to the Second Opium War (1856–1860). Under the Treaty of Aigun in 1858 and the Treaty of Beijing in 1860, China ceded to Russia extensive trading rights and regions adjacent to the Amur and Ussuri rivers and allowed Russia to begin building a port and naval base at Vladivostok. As part of the foreign policy goals in Europe, Russia initially gave guarded support to France's anti-Austrian diplomacy. A weak Franco-Russian entente soured, however, when France backed a Polish uprising against Russian rule in 1863. Russia then aligned itself more closely with Prussia by approving the unification of Germany in exchange for a revision of the Treaty of Paris and the remilitarization of the Black Sea. These diplomatic achievements came at a London conference in 1871, following France's defeat in the Franco-Prussian War. After 1871 Germany, united under Prussian leadership, was the strongest continental power in Europe. In 1873 Germany formed the loosely knit League of the Three Emperors with Russia and Austria-Hungary to prevent them from forming an alliance with France. Nevertheless, Austro-Hungarian and Russian ambitions clashed in the Balkans, where rivalries among Slavic nationalities and anti-Ottoman sentiments seethed.

In the 1870s, Russian nationalist opinion became a serious domestic factor in its support for liberating Balkan Christians from Ottoman rule and making Bulgaria and Serbia quasi-protectorates of Russia. From 1875 to 1877, the Balkan crisis escalated with the rebellion in Bosnia and Herzegovina, and insurrection in Bulgaria, which the Ottoman Turks suppressed with such great cruelty that Serbia, but none of the West European powers, declared war. In early 1877, Russia came to the rescue of beleaguered Serbia when it went to war with the Ottoman Empire of 1877–1878. Within one year, Russian troops were nearing Constantinople, and the Ottomans surrendered. Russia's nationalist diplomats and generals persuaded Alexander II to force the Ottomans to sign the Treaty of San Stefano in March 1878, creating an enlarged, independent Bulgaria that stretched into the southwestern Balkans. Another significant result of the 1877–78 Russo-Turkish War in Russia's favour was the acquisition from the Ottomans of the provinces of Batum, Ardahan, and Kars in the South Caucasus, which were transformed into the militarily administered regions of Batum Oblast and Kars Oblast. To replace Muslim refugees who had fled across the new frontier into Ottoman territory the Russian authorities settled large numbers of Christians from an ethnically diverse range of communities in Kars Oblast, particularly the Greek Orthodox Georgians and Caucasus Greeks, and Christian but mainly non-Orthodox Armenians, all of whom hoped to achieve their own regional ambitions on the back of the Russian Empire. When Britain threatened to declare war over the terms of the Treaty of San Stefano, an exhausted Russia backed down. At the Congress of Berlin in July 1878, Russia agreed to the creation of a smaller Bulgaria. Russian nationalists were furious with Austria-Hungary and Germany for failing to back Russia, but the Tsar accepted a revived and strengthened League of the Three Emperors as well as Austro-Hungarian hegemony in the western Balkans.

Russian diplomatic and military interests subsequently re-focussed on Central Asia, where Russia had quelled a series of uprisings in the 1870s, and Russia incorporated hitherto independent emirates into the empire. Britain renewed its concerns in 1881 when Russian troops occupied Turkmen lands on the Persian and Afghan borders, but Germany lent diplomatic support to Russian advances, and an Anglo-Russian war was averted. Meanwhile, Russia's sponsorship of Bulgarian independence brought negative results as the Bulgarians, angry at Russia's continuing interference in domestic affairs, sought the support of Austria-Hungary. In the dispute that arose between Austria-Hungary and Russia, Germany took a firm position toward Russia while mollifying the tsar with a bilateral defensive alliance, the Reinsurance Treaty of 1887 between Germany and Russia. Within a year, Russo-German acrimony led to Otto von Bismarck's forbidding further loans to Russia, and France replaced Germany as Russia's financier. When Wilhelm II dismissed Bismarck in 1890, the loose Russo-Prussian entente collapsed after having lasted for more than twenty-five years. Three years later, Russia allied itself with France by entering into a joint military convention, which matched the dual alliance formed in 1879 by Germany and Austria-Hungary.

== Russia and the U.S. Civil War ==
=== Russia rejects the Anglo-French Intrigues for interference ===
The clouds of world war gathered densely over the planet. Russell and Gladstone, now joined by Napoleon III, continued to demand aggressive meddling in US affairs. This outcome was avoided because of British and French fears of what Russia might do if they continued to launch bellicose gestures against the Union. On 29 October 1862 there occurred in St. Petersburg an extremely cordial meeting of Russian Foreign Minister Alexander Gorchakov with US chargé d'affaires Bayard Taylor, which was marked by a formal Russian pledge never to move against the US, and to oppose any attempt by other powers to do so. Taylor reported these comments by Gortchakov to the State Department: "You know the sentiments of Russia. We desire above all things the maintenance of the American Union as one indivisible nation. We cannot take any part, more than we have done. We have no hostility to the Southern people. Russia has declared her position and will maintain it. There will be proposals of intervention [by Britain and France]. We believe that intervention could do no good at present. Proposals will be made to Russia to join some plan of interference. She will refuse any intervention of the kind. Russia will occupy the same ground as at the beginning of the struggle. You may rely upon it, she will not change. But we entreat you to settle the difficulty. I cannot express to you how profound an anxiety we feel – how serious are our fears."

The Journal de St.-Pétersbourg, the official gazette of the Tsarist government, denounced the Anglo-French intervention plan against the US, which had been inspired by Russell. This article helped prevent a wider war: the British cabinet, informed of the Russian attitude by telegraph, voted down Russell's aggressive project. Russell made his last bid to swing the British cabinet in favor of a policy of interference together with Napoleon III against the Union on 12 November 1862, but he was unable to carry the day, and this turned out to be his last chance for the year.

US Secretary of State William H. Seward thought that if the Anglo-French were to assail the Union, they would soon find themselves at war with Russia as well. He wrote to John Bigelow early in the war: "I have a belief that the European State, whichever one it may be, that commits itself to intervention anywhere in North America, will sooner or later fetch up in the arms of a native of an oriental country not especially distinguished for amiability of manners or temper."

=== Adams to Russell: "superfluous to point out this means war ===
The summer of 1863, despite the news of Gettysburg and Vicksburg, was marked by another close brush with US-UK war. It was on 5 September 1863 that US Ambassador Charles Francis Adams Sr. told British Foreign Secretary Lord Russell that if the Scorpion-class ironclads – powerful warships capable of breaking the Union blockade which were then under construction in England – were allowed to leave port, "It would be superfluous in me to point out to your Lordship that this is war." Lord Russell had to pause, and then backed off entirely. The Scorpion-class ships were put under surveillance by the British government on 9 September, and finally seized by the British government in mid-October, 1863. They never fought for the Confederacy.

A revolt against Russian domination of Poland, incited by the British, started in 1863 and lasted into late 1864. Crook points out that it was Lord Russell who told British Ambassador to the US Lord Lyons in March 1863 that the Polish issue had the potential to create a Russo-American common front and thus revolutionize world power relations, evidently to the detriment of London. Such a prophecy was coherent with the then-fashionable ideas of Alexis de Tocqueville about Russia and America as the two great powers of the future.

=== Russian fleets in New York and San Francisco ===
The most dramatic gestures of cooperation between the Russian Empire and the United States came in the autumn of 1863, as the Laird rams crisis hung in the balance. On 24 September, the Russian Baltic fleet began to arrive in New York harbor. On 12 October, the Russian Far East fleet began to arrive in San Francisco. The Russians, judging that they were on the verge of war with Britain and France over the British-fomented Polish insurrection of 1863, had taken this measure to prevent their ships from being bottled up in their home ports by the superior British fleet. These ships were also the tokens of the vast Russian land armies that could be thrown in the scales on a number of fronts, including the northwest frontier of India; the British had long been worried about such an eventuality. In mid-July 1863, French Foreign Minister Édouard Drouyn de Lhuys was offering London the joint occupation of Poland by means of invasion. But the experience of the Confederate commerce raiders had graphically illustrated just how effective even a limited number of warships could be when they turned to commerce raiding, which is what the Russian naval commanders had been ordered to do in case of hostilities. The Russian admirals had also been told that, if the US and Russia were to find themselves at war with Britain and France, the Russian ships should place themselves under Lincoln's command and operate in synergy with the US Navy against the common enemies. It is thus highly significant that the Russian ships were sent to the United States.

=== Navy Secretary Gideon Welles: "God Bless the Russians" ===
Coming on the heels of the bloody Union reverse at Chickamauga, the news of the Russian fleet unleashed an immense wave of euphoria in the North. It was this moment that inspired the later verses of Oliver Wendell Holmes, one of the most popular writers in America, for the 1871 friendship visit of the Russian Grand Duke Alexis:

Bleak are our shores with the blasts of December, / Fettered and chill is the rivulet's flow; / Thrilling and warm are the hearts that remember / Who was our friend when the world was our foe. ... Fires of the North in eternal communion, / Blend your broad flashes with evening's bright star; / God bless the Empire that loves the Great Union; / Strength to her people! Long life to the Czar!

The Russians, as Clay reported to Seward and Lincoln, were delighted in turn by the celebration of their fleets, which stayed in American waters for over six months as the Polish revolt was quelled. The Russian officers were lionized and feted, and had their pictures taken by the famous New York photographer Matthew Brady. When an attack on San Francisco by the Confederate cruiser Shenandoah seemed to be imminent, the Russian admiral there gave orders to his ships to defend the city if necessary. There were no major Union warships on the scene, so Russia was about to fight for the United States. In the event, the Confederate raider did not attack. Soon after the war, Russia sold Alaska to the United States, in part because they felt that an influx of Americans searching for gold was inevitable, and in part to keep the British from seizing control of this vast region. Lincoln's Secretary of the Navy Gideon Welles wrote in his diary, "The Russian fleet has come out of the Baltic and is now in New York, or a large number of the vessels have arrived…. In sending them to this country at this time there is something significant." Welles was fully justified in his famous concluding words, "God bless the Russians!". This exceedingly cordial Russo-American friendship set the tone of much nineteenth-century historiography

== Revolutionary movements ==
Alexander II's reforms, particularly the lifting of state censorship, fostered the expression of political and social thought. The regime relied on journals and newspapers to gain support for its domestic and foreign policies. But liberal, nationalist, and radical writers also helped to mold public opinion in opposition to tsarism, to private property, and to the imperial state. Because many intellectuals, professionals, peasants, and workers shared these opposition sentiments, the regime regarded the publications and the radical organizations as dangerous. From the 1860s through the 1880s, Russian radicals, collectively known as "Populists" (Narodniki), focused chiefly on the peasantry, whom they identified as "the people" (narod).

The leaders of the Populist movement included radical writers, idealists, and advocates of terrorism. In the 1860s, Nikolai Chernyshevsky, the most important radical writer of the period, posited that Russia could bypass capitalism and move directly to socialism. His most influential work, Что делать? (What Is to Be Done?, 1863), describes the role of an individual of a superior nature who guides a new, revolutionary generation. Other radicals such as the incendiary anarchist Mikhail Bakunin (1814–1876) and his terrorist collaborator, Sergey Nechayev (1847–1882), urged direct action. The calmer Petr Tkachev (1844–1886) argued against the advocates of Marxism, maintaining that a centralized revolutionary band had to seize power before capitalism could fully develop. Disputing his views, the moralist and individualist Petr Lavrov (1823–1900) made a call "to the people", which hundreds of idealists heeded in 1873 and 1874 by leaving their schools for the countryside to try to generate a mass movement among the narod. However, The Populist campaign failed when the peasants showed hostility to the urban idealists and the government began to consider nationalist opinion more seriously.

The radicals reconsidered their approach, and in 1876 they formed a propagandist organization called Land and Liberty (Zemlya i volya), which leaned toward terrorism. This orientation became stronger three years later, when the group renamed itself the People's Will (Narodnaya Volya), the name under which the radicals carried out the assassination of Alexander II in 1881. In 1879 Georgi Plekhanov formed a propagandist faction of Land and Liberty called Black Repartition (Черный передел, Chernyi Peredel), which advocated redistributing all land to the peasantry. This group studied Marxism, which, paradoxically, was principally concerned with urban industrial workers. The People's Will remained underground.
