= Law of the Russian Empire =

Law of the Russian Empire emanated directly from the Emperor. The legal system of the Russian Empire did not recognize the existence of natural rights and the rights of the population were entirely a creation of the law. Different regions were governed based on historical customs that were present prior to their incorporation into the Empire.

The law had a strong awareness of social categories, but it did not provide for an absolute division in terms of race or ethnicity between the rulers and the ruled.

The approach to the law in the Empire has been described as legal pluralism.

== Sources of law ==
Laws could be issued in various forms, such as manifestos, ordinances, charters, and opinions of the State Council. Among these, ukases (Russian: ука́з, romanized: ukáz, pl ука́зы ukázy, a kind of decree.) were the most prevalent. They could be issued by the Emperor as well as various state institutions, such as the Governing Senate. Starting from 1906, legislation could also be adopted by the Imperial Duma.

The Digest of Laws of the Russian Empire was the collection of the laws in force. The first edition of the digest was in 1832 and the last one in 1917. Since 1863, the Governing Senate of the Empire was tasked with the publication of laws. This practice continued until the October Revolution in 1917.

Imperial authorities also published Complete Collection of the Laws of the Russian Empire, which contained a chronological list of laws. The first edition covered the period from 1649 to 1825 and was published in 1830. Printing of the second edition started almost immediately, covering laws not included in the previous version, typically one volume was published in a calendar year. In 1882, the production of the Collection was assigned to the State Council, since then, 33 volumes published that covered Russian law from 1881 to 1913.

Some aspects of Russian imperial society were governed by customary law, a practice to which imperial authorities were often hostile. This included the customs of rural Russia, those of the indigenous peoples of Siberia incorporated during the eastward expansion, and the tribal customs of the Caucasus people.

== History ==
The Council Code (Note: Also known as Sobornoye Ulozheniye.) adopted in 1649 was intended to be the most comprehensive formulation of Russian law. All further legislation was deemed to be its extension, correction, or clarification. By 1700, there were around 1,500 such extensions, which were often inconsistent and hard for officials to handle.

Peter I implemented a reform of the legal system. In 1711, he created the Governing Senate, which functioned like a Supreme Court, and later the Iustits-Kollegiia, which functioned like a Ministry of Justice. He also recruited foreign lawyers to Russia and introduced a system of legal education, which was initially staffed with German professors. The legislative process under Peter's successors was chaotic, with the innovation of one ruler being reverted by their successor. The Council Code continued to be the primary document, as stipulated by Peter in 1714. A few attempts to provide an up-to-date version did not lead to any results.

Catherine II, shortly after ascending to the throne, decided to draft a new document to replace the Code. For this end, she issued the Nakaz in 1767, which contained a list of instructions for the drafting body. This attempt ultimately went into oblivion since most of the state's effort was dedicated to the Russo-Turkish Wars and the Partitions of Poland. Her son, Paul I, returned to the task, but did not manage to finish it due to the shortness of his reign. The work was restarted under the reign of Alexander I and finished under his brother, Nicholas I, with the publication of the Digest of Laws of the Russian Empire. Mikhail Speransky was responsible for the work; in his words, the Digest was "a true reflection of what is in the laws".

Alexander II, as part of his Great Reforms, introduced a judicial reform in 1864. This reform was motivated by the abolition of serfdom in the Russian Empire and contemporary developments in court systems in European countries. The new Russian judicial system after this reform was based on the following principles: an independent judiciary, oral and adversarial trial, equality of all before the law, introduction of legal representation, jury trial for serious criminal cases. At the same time, traditional peasant justice continued to operate with minimal influence from the government. In 1881, Alexander II approved a proposal of far-reaching constitutional changes, including the introduction of elections, but a few hours later, he was assassinated. His son, Alexander III, changed the approach and concentrated on preserving the Russian autocracy.

The Russian Revolution of 1905 led to a series of measures introduced by Nicholas II. These included the creation of the State Duma, the publication of the October Manifesto, and the adoption of the Russian Constitution of 1906. After the February Revolution in 1917, the Provisional Government assumed the role of the supreme legislator. Laws issued by it were mainly of symbolic significance, as it was not able to enforce them. The Bolsheviks overthrew the government and arrested its members. They declared the previous order antiquated and claimed the start of a new revolutionary era.

== Legal subjects ==
=== Criminal law ===
Criminal and civil law were separated under Peter I. The Criminal Code was enacted in 1845 and a new version followed in 1903. European experts were consulted in the preparation of the 1903 Code, which was generally positively received abroad. The Criminal Procedure Statute was introduced in 1864.

=== Civil Law ===
In the early 19th century under Alexander I, there were attempts to create a separate Civil Code, which, however, didn't lead to any legislation. Another attempt was made in the 20th century with a draft created in 1905 and published in 1910, but again, it did not become law. This was the only major act of legislation to which Russian legal scholars significantly contributed. The Civil Procedure Statute was introduced in 1864.

Family law was mostly under the Church jurisdiction.

=== Social classes ===
==== Nobility ====
Of all the classes of the Russian Empire, the nobility was the most crucial. Peter I reformed it with the introduction of the Table of Ranks, which allowed entrance to the class upon reaching high ranks during military or civil service. The Russian nobility was obliged to enter state service, an expectation that was eliminated in 1762. The privileges of the nobles were formalized by a 1785 decree, and a decree of 1825 allowed them to engage in trade.

Reaching its highest influence in the second part of the 18th century, the Russian nobility gradually lost its privileges so that by the February Revolution of 1917, all practical consequences of class differences were eliminated by special laws.

==== Peasants ====
Peasants constituted a majority of the Russian population, and a large part of them, up to the abolition of serfdom, were serfs whose rights were severely restricted by their attachment to the soil. Fugitive serfs posed an issue for the state. Russia had a special corps of detectives to deal with the problem, and landowners were prohibited from employing them.

In the early 1800s, peasant rights expanded. State peasants were allowed to buy land, and landowners were granted the right to free their serfs if the latter were able to pay for it, though this had little practical effect. A series of decrees also expanded peasants' possibilities to engage in small-scale trade. The right to own land was extended to serfs in 1848.

The serfdom was abolished in 1861. The freed peasants were obliged to pay the state annually for the land they acquired. This practice stopped in 1907 with the introduction of an agrarian reform, the goal of which was to make the individual peasant a principal agricultural agent, in contrast to the rural community (Note: Also known as obshchina.), as it was in the past.

==== Clergy ====
The clergy was a legally defined class in the Russian Empire. It consisted of the white clergy (secular priests) and the black clergy (monks). Parish clergy were expected to supervise peasants to obey their masters. The clergy was exempted from the authority of magistrates, but was not eligible to serve there, it was also exempted from corporal punishment, and children of the clerical class could be conscripted into the Russian army.

=== International law ===
The Russian Empire convened the Saint Petersburg Declaration of 1868 and the 1874 Brussels Convention, which were aimed at regulating the laws and customs of war. After the conclusion of the 1874 Convention, Russia continued to lobby for the ratification of a code of land warfare. Its proposal formed a basis for the Hague Conventions of 1899 and 1907, the first of which was proposed by Russia.

American historian Peter Holquist describes Friedrich Martens as the most important and influential Russian thinker on international law.
