= Zarudny =

Zarudny is a surname. Notable people with the surname include:

- Alexander Zarudny (1863-1934), Russian lawyer and politician
- Ivan Zarudny (late 17th/early 18th c.), Ukrainian wood-carver and icon-painter
- Nikolai Zarudny (1859–1919), Ukrainian-Russian explorer and zoologist
- Sergei Ivanovich Zarudny (1821–1887), Ukrainian-Russian lawyer and statesman

See also

- Samiilo Bohdanovych-Zarudny (17th c.), Cossack diplomat, noble and general judge
