= Assembly of the Nobility =

Governing body in the Russian Empire

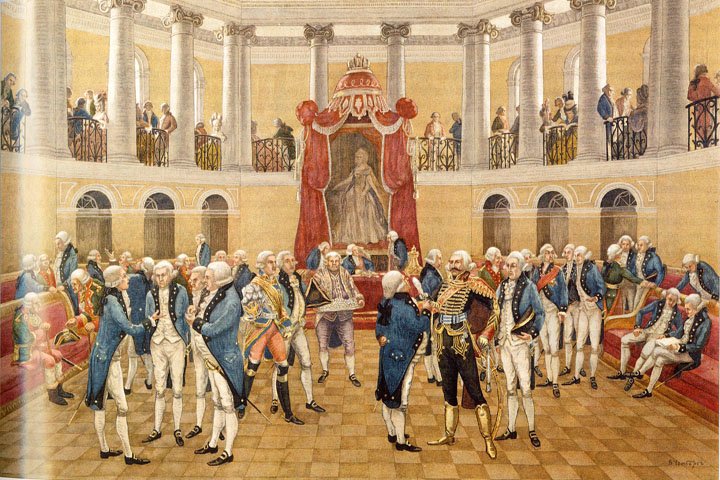
The gentry assembly in Moscow at the time of Catherine the Great

The Assembly of the Nobility (Russian: дворянское собрание, благородное собрание) was a self-governing body of the sosloviye (estate) of the Russian nobility in Imperial Russia from 1766 to 1917. Their official status was defined by the Charter to the Gentry in 1785. The Nobility Assemblies were at the guberniya and uyezd levels. Sometimes it is also translated as Gentry Assembly.

The chair of an Assembly of Nobility was called Gubernia (Uyezd) Marshal of Nobility. These Assemblies governed both the dvoryanstvo itself and took part in the governing of local affairs of the whole society, such as the election of the persons to the posts in local administration and police. After the Emancipation reform of 1861 in Russia and subsequent reforms, their purpose became mostly affairs of the nobility.

This institution ceased to exist in Russia after the October Revolution. After the dissolution of the Soviet Union, in 1990 the descendants of Russian nobility founded the Russian Assembly of Nobility, a public non-political organization.

== Clubhouse ==
Assemblies of nobility typically had clubhouses also called "Assembly of Nobility", colloquially referred to as "the Assembly" (собрание) among the peers. The most famous one was that of the Moscow Assembly of the Nobility; the building is now known as the House of the Unions.
