= Konstantin Pobedonostsev =

Russian statesman and jurist (1827–1907)

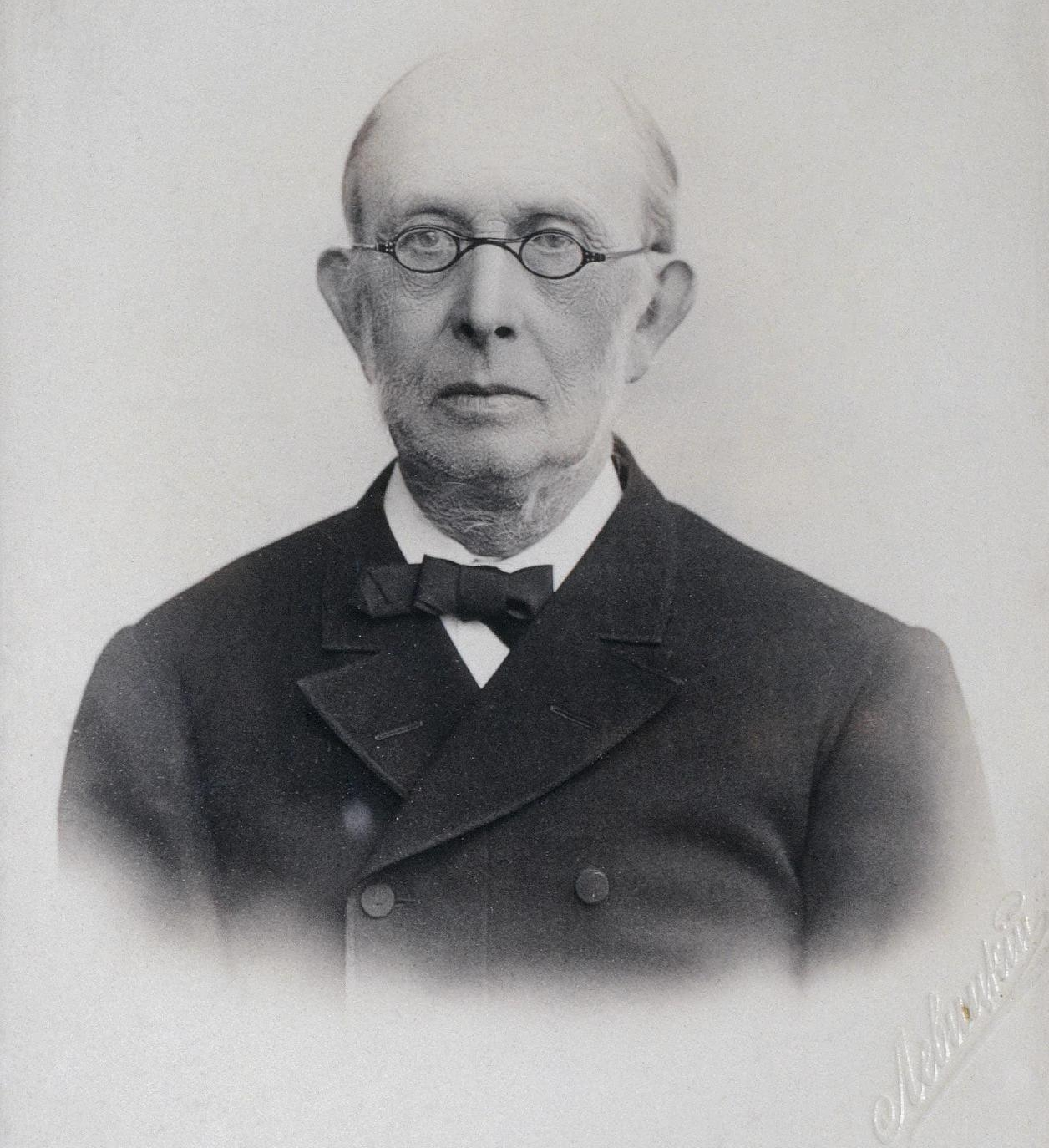
- Pobedonostsev in 1902

Ober-Procurator of the Most Holy Synod
- In office 24 April 1880 – 19 October 1905
- Monarchs: Alexander II; Alexander III; Nicholas II
- Preceded by: Dmitry Tolstoy
- Succeeded by: Alexey Obolensky

Personal details
- Born: Konstantin Petrovich Pobedonostsev; 30 November 1827 Moscow, Moscow Governorate, Russian Empire
- Died: 23 March 1907 (aged 79) Saint Petersburg, Russian Empire
- Education: Imperial School of Jurisprudence
- Occupation: Jurist, teacher

Konstantin Petrovich Pobedonostsev (Russian: Константи́н Петро́вич Победоно́сцев, IPA: [kənstɐnʲˈtʲin pʲɪˈtrovʲɪtɕ pəbʲɪdɐˈnostsɨf]; 30 November 1827 – 23 March 1907) was a Russian jurist and statesman who served as an adviser to three Russian emperors. During the reign of Alexander III of Russia, Pobedonostsev was considered the chief spokesman for reactionary positions and the éminence grise of imperial politics. Between 1880 and 1905, he served as Over-Procurator of the Most Holy Synod, making him the non-clerical Russian official who supervised the Russian Orthodox Church.

His writings on politics, law, art, and culture emphasized the positive element of the spiritual and secular unification of Russia with the acceptance of Christianity, while simultaneously condemning the Jewish population. He warned of the negative element in Russia, portraying democratic and liberal movements as enemies of the national and religious unity of the Russian people. He opined that the task of achieving a harmonious society meant there was a collective responsibility to uphold political and religious unity, which justified the close supervision of Russian behaviour and thinking as a necessity.

== Life ==
Pobedonostsev's father, Pyotr Vasilyevich Pobedonostsev, was a professor of literature at Moscow State University. In 1841, he sent his son, then aged 14, to the Imperial School of Jurisprudence in St. Petersburg, which had been established to prepare young men for civil service. After graduation, Konstantin Pobedonostsev entered the public service as an official in the eighth Moscow department of the Senate. The task of the department was to resolve civil cases from guberniyas surrounding Moscow. He was promoted rapidly within the eighth department.

From 1860 to 1865, he taught civil law at Moscow State University. In 1861, Tsar Alexander II invited him to instruct his son and heir, Nicholas, in the theory of law and administration. In 1865, young Nicholas died, and Pobedonostsev was invited to teach Nicholas's brother Alexander (the future Tsar Alexander III). In 1866, Pobedonostsev moved to a permanent residence in St. Petersburg. Pobedonostsev and Tsarevich Alexander remained very close for almost thirty years, through Alexander's ascension as Tsar in 1881 and until his death in 1894.

He became a member of the Council of the Empire, and in 1880, Chief Procurator of the Most Holy Synod. In the latter office, Pobedonostsev was operating head of the Russian Orthodox Church. During the reign of Alexander III, he was one of the most influential men in Imperial Russia. He was the mastermind of Manifesto on Unshakeable Autocracy of 29 April 1881, which proclaimed that the absolute power of the Tsar was unshakable, thus putting an end to Loris-Melikov's endeavours to establish a representative body in the empire.

Pobedonostsev's ascension in the first days after the assassination of Alexander II resulted in the subsequent resignation of Loris-Melikov and other ministers eager for liberal reforms. He was an uncompromising conservative and never shrank from boldly expressing his staunch opinions. He issued a manifesto, with the approval of Alexander the Second, demanding the abolishment of the constitutional movement: "Amid our affliction, the voice of God orders us to vigorously take the ruling power in our own hands..." He was chosen as a firm, severe hand to take over the universities after the 1899 mass student strikes. Consequently, in progressive circles he was denounced as an obscurantist, pedant, and an enemy of progress.

After the death of Alexander III, he lost much of his influence. Tsar Nicholas II adhered to his father's Russification policy and even extending it to Finland, but he generally disliked the idea of systematic religious persecution, and was not wholly averse to the partial emancipation of the Church from civil control.

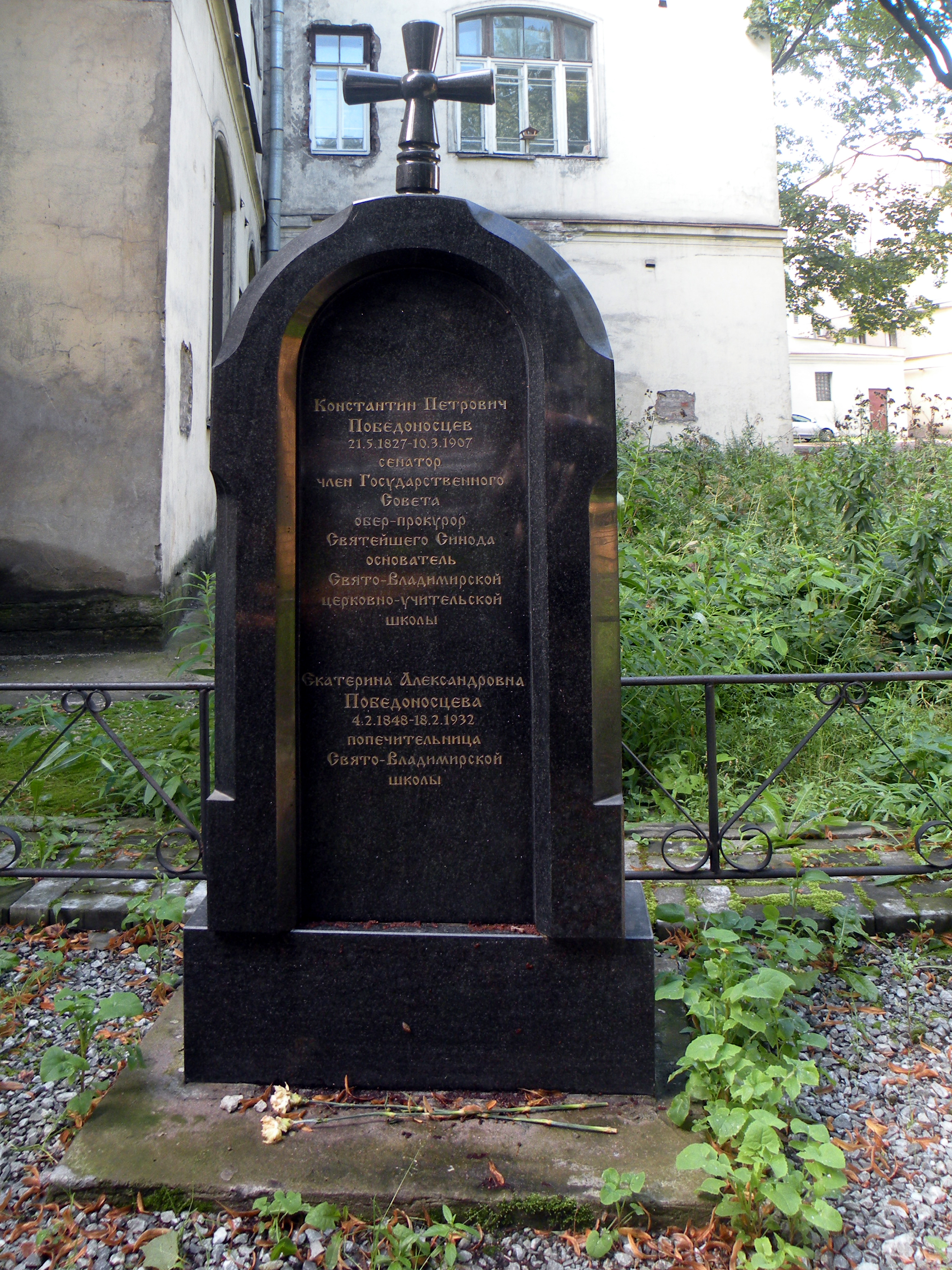
Konstantin Pobedonostsev grave

On March 8, 1901, Nikolai Lagovsky, a socialist civil servant and statistician, tried to kill Pobedonostsev, shooting through the window of Pobedonostsev's office. He fired six times and all missed his target. Lagovsky said Pobedonostev, "spread superstition and ignorance among the people through church schools." Lagovski was sentenced to 6 years of katorga.

Pobedonostsev ordered Tolstoy's excommunication in 1901.

During the Russian Revolution of 1905 which followed the disastrous war with Japan, Pobedonostsev, being nearly 80 years of age, retired from public affairs. He died on 23 March 1907.

He was fictionalized as old senator Ableukhov in Andrey Bely's novel Petersburg (1912). Arguably he was also depicted in Leo Tolstoy's Anna Karenina as Alexei Alexandrovich Karenin.

== Jurisprudence ==
Though Pobedonostsev is mostly known as a statesman and thinker, his contribution to Russian civil law is significant. He is generally regarded as one of the most educated European jurists of the 19th century. His main work was the three-volume "Course of Civil Law" (Курс гражданского права), published in 1868, 1871 and 1880, respectively.

Before the Russian Revolution of 1905, the Course was reprinted several times with minor changes. The Course was regarded as outstanding guide for practising lawyers. Quotations from the Course are reported to have been used as a ground for decisions of the Civil Board of the Senate. The author's profound knowledge of Russian civil law resulted in description of many previously insufficiently explored institutions such as communal land law.

In addition, Pobedonostsev published in 1865 in Moskovskie Vedomosti several anonymous articles on the judicial reform of Alexander II.

== Doctrines and policies ==
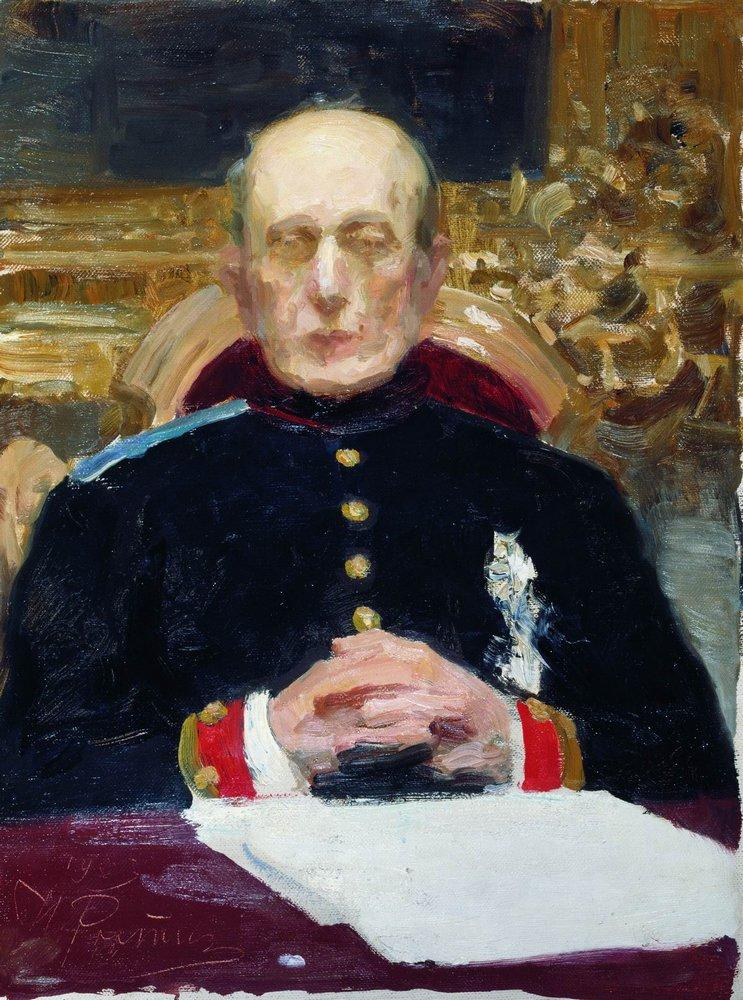
Pobedonostsev was known for his gaunt figure and pale, corpse-like countenance, as one may judge from this portrait by Ilya Repin.

Pobedonostsev held the view that human nature is sinful, rejecting the ideals of freedom and independence as dangerous delusions of nihilistic youth.

In his "Reflections of a Russian Statesman" (1896), he promoted autocracy and condemned elections, representation and democracy, the jury system, the press, free education, charities, and social reforms. He despised representative government, and denounced the notion of an all-Russian parliament. He also condemned Social Darwinism as an erroneous generalisation of Darwin's Theory of Evolution.

In the early years of the reign of Alexander II, Pobedonostsev maintained, though keeping aloof from the Slavophiles, that Western institutions were radically bad in themselves and totally inapplicable to Russia, since they had no roots in Russian history and culture and did not correspond to the spirit of Russian people. In that period, he contributed several papers to Alexander Herzen's radical periodical Voices from Russia.

He denounced democracy as "the insupportable dictatorship of vulgar crowd". He argued that parliaments, trial by jury, freedom of the press, and secular education were undesirable alien nostrums. He subjected all of them to a severe analysis in his Reflections of a Russian Statesman. He once stated that Russia should be "frozen in time", showing his undivided commitment to autocracy.

To these dangerous products of Western thought he found a counterpoise in popular vis inertiae, and in the respect of the masses for institutions developed slowly and automatically during the past centuries of national life. In his view, human society evolves naturally, just like a tree grows. The human mind is not able to perceive the logic of social development. Any attempt at reforming society is an act of violence and a crime. Among the practical deductions drawn from these premises is the necessity of preserving autocratic power, and of fostering among the people the traditional veneration for the ritual of the national Church.

In the sphere of practical politics Pobedonostsev exercised considerable influence in the Russification policy of Alexander III. This found expression in nationalist propaganda.

=== Antisemitism ===
Pobedonostsev particularly advised the anti-Jewish measures taken during Alexander III's administration. These began with the temporary "May Laws" that banned Jews from rural areas and shtetls even within the Pale of Settlement. The May Laws did not lapse; further policies led to deportations of Jews from large cities, enrollment quotas in public education, and a proscription against voting in local elections.

His anti-Jewish measures, at least, may have stemmed from a personal motive. British author Arnold White, interested in Jewish agricultural colonisation in Argentina, visited Pobedonostsev with credentials from Baron de Hirsch; Pobedonostsev said to him: "The characteristics of the Jewish race are parasitic; for their sustenance they require the presence of another race as "host" although they remain aloof and self-contained. Take them from the living organism, put them on a rock, and they die. They cannot cultivate the soil." He was also by 1894 credited (dubiously) with illustrating the goal of his anti-Jewish measures as making "a third of Jews die out, a third move out, and a third dissolve tracelessly into the surrounding population" (Russian: "Одна треть вымрет, одна выселится, одна треть бесследно растворится в окружающем населении"). He was also a supporter of Baron Maurice de Hirsch's efforts for Jewish colonization in Argentina.

=== Church policies ===
Pobedonostsev was not always a reactionary. He had originally welcomed the Great Reforms that Alexander II undertook in the 1860s-1870s. However, he soon became alarmed by the weakening of the rural estates and the tsarist bureaucracy. He decided that a deeper spiritual unity of the tsar and his people was needed to restore stability to Russia. When Alexander III ascended the throne in 1881, Pobedonostsev rapidly gained a powerful influence over the affairs of both church and state. To establish order he suppressed all reform efforts. The reforms of the 1860s had legalized the role of Protestant and other non-Orthodox religions. Pobedonostsev said Russia needed an Orthodox monopoly. However, he failed to win over the civil authorities, the judicial authorities, and the religious department in his struggle against the non-Orthodox. As a result, his policies, which were intended to unify, actually engendered dissension and violence and in the long run contributed to the collapse of the Russian Empire.

Pobedonostsev did develop a social program for the Church while limiting its autonomy. He imposed repressive measures against the non-Orthodox. He carried out major Church reforms, but they resulted in a church that by 1900 was enmeshed in bureaucracy, alienated in many ways from society, resentful of secular authorities, and divided internally. Stagnation in church and state policies prevailed until Pobedonostsev retired in 1905. In the long run, argues Polunov, Pobedonostsev's attempts to impose safe conservative barriers to reform and his hostility toward innovation served only to weaken the autocratic state from within.

== Works ==
- Reflections of a Russian Statesman by Konstantin Petrovich Pobedonostsev. Published by G. Richards, 1898.
  - University of Michigan Press. 1964. ISBN 0-472-06104-6.
- "Russia and Popular Education", The North American Review, Volume 173, No. 538, September 1901.

== See also ==
- Konstantin Leontiev
- Ivan Delyanov
- Mikhail Katkov
