= Trudoden =

Accounting books for Trudoden tracking in the State Historic and Archaeological Museum in Krasnodar, Russian Federation

Trudoden (Russian: Трудодень, portmanteau literally meaning labour-day) was a unit of value and a type of accounting of quantity and quality of labor (as a factor of production) in collective farms (kolkhozes) of the Soviet Union in 1930 – 1966, and a non-transferable money surrogate in a way, that it was supposed to be eventually exchanged for agricultural goods (but the exchange was not guaranteed). The term became widely used following the adaptation of the "Model Charter of an Agricultural Artel" on 13 April 1930 by the Central Executive Committee of the Soviet Union and the Council of People's Commissars of the Soviet Union. It literally means a day of labor. In informal speech, the term was known as a "work for sticks" (as each trudoden was marked with a pencil as a vertical stick in a register, in front of a worker's name). Trudoden was used exclusively in collective farms, not in Soviet state farms (sovkhozes), which were considered state enterprises. Starting in 1959, the Soviet government declared that trudoden could be exchanged for money (making it a fixed monetary convertible unit) until 1966, when it was phased out. Aside of the USSR, it was also adopted under various names by PRC (1958–1980s), North Vietnam (1950s–1988), Socialist Republic of Romania (1949–1962), People's Republic of Bulgaria (1950–1969), Hungarian People's Republic (1948–1968) and Czechoslovakia (1950s), Tanzania, Mozambique, Angola (1970–1980s), Cambodia (1975–1979), Belarus (1990s), Cuba, North Korea, and Luhansk People's Republic.

== Brief description ==
It was the only form of wage payment on collective farms, as in-kind compensation for labor equaled the number of trudodens for a given period. Each peasant was required to put in 60–100 labor-days per year, depending on the region and the level of mechanization at the collective farm. Schoolchildren over the age of 12 were required to complete a mandatory quota of 50 "labor days" (work units). Those who failed to meet this requirement were expelled from the collective farm, and their household plot of land could be confiscated. During the war, this quota was raised to 150 labor days per year. Failure to fulfill it was punishable by corrective labor. Among the members of a kolkhoz (collective farm), produce was distributed based on trudodni (plural from: labor-day units) according to a "residual principle": this occurred only after settling obligations to the state (compulsory deliveries, zagatovki), repaying seed loans, paying for the services of Machine and Tractor Stations (MTS, assisting state enterprises), replenishing seed and fodder stocks, and selling a portion of the output to the state or on the collective farm market. Monetary income was distributed according to the same principle. Until the mid-1950s, the average payment per *trudoden* amounted to approximately 36% of the average daily wage of an industrial worker, while annual earnings were one-third of those in sovkhozy (state farms) and one-fourth of those in the industrial sector. According to S. V. Kosior — who served as General Secretary and First Secretary of the Central Committee of the Communist Party (Bolsheviks) of Ukraine from 1928 to 1938 — in 1931, 48% of agricultural holdings in Ukraine provided no remuneration whatsoever for labor-days. Besides working for free, starting from 1932, a Soviet peasant on a collective farm was not permitted to leave his or her village without permission from the head of the local collective farm.

Following World War II, to fight the post-war famine in the Soviet Union, the Presidium of the Supreme Soviet of the Soviet Union issued ukase: “On the eviction to remote areas of persons who maliciously evade work in agriculture and lead an antisocial, parasitic lifestyle,” based on which, without investigation and court proceedings (Russian: "Без суда и следствия"), during 1948 to 1953 over 33.2 thousand people were evicted for a term of 8 years.

Members of collective farms were paid with products of agriculture (usually being a part of collected crops) based on the amount of trudodni (plural form) earned. Payments to the collective farm members were made with natural products such as grain, often of a very poor quality, when and if they were able to realize their products.

== Legacy ==
The term is mentioned in the 1952 filmed stage production "In the Ukrainian Steppes" (Russian: В степях Украины) after a play by Oleksandr Korniychuk, for which he received the State Stalin Prize in 1941.

== See also ==
- Wage slavery
