= Alexei Strolman =

Russian mining engineer, historian, and author

Alexei Petrovich Strolman (c. 1811–1898, aged 86-87), Строльман (Алексей Петрович), was a Russian mining engineer, historian and author. He is known for his work with the commission for the emancipation of the serfs, and for his history of mining in Russia published as a series of articles in the Mining Journal (Russia) .

Strolman received his education from the mining cadet school in St. Petersburg, and began publishing on mining and geological topics as early as 1835. He was a compatriot of Nikolay Milyutin. In 1859, he was part the Editing Commission which worked out the text of the Emancipation Manifesto of 3 March 1861 (NS), and then he worked for four years on its implementation.

From 1870 to 1880, Strolman was the scientist member on the Imperial Mining and Mining Board Committee. He devoted the final years of his life to writing, producing a series of articles on mining for the Mining Journal (Russia) (Горном Журнале, Gornyi Zhurnal ). Some of Strolman's articles were translated into French and German
