= Government reforms of Alexander II of Russia =

Series of reforms enacted by the Emperor and Autocrat of all Russia

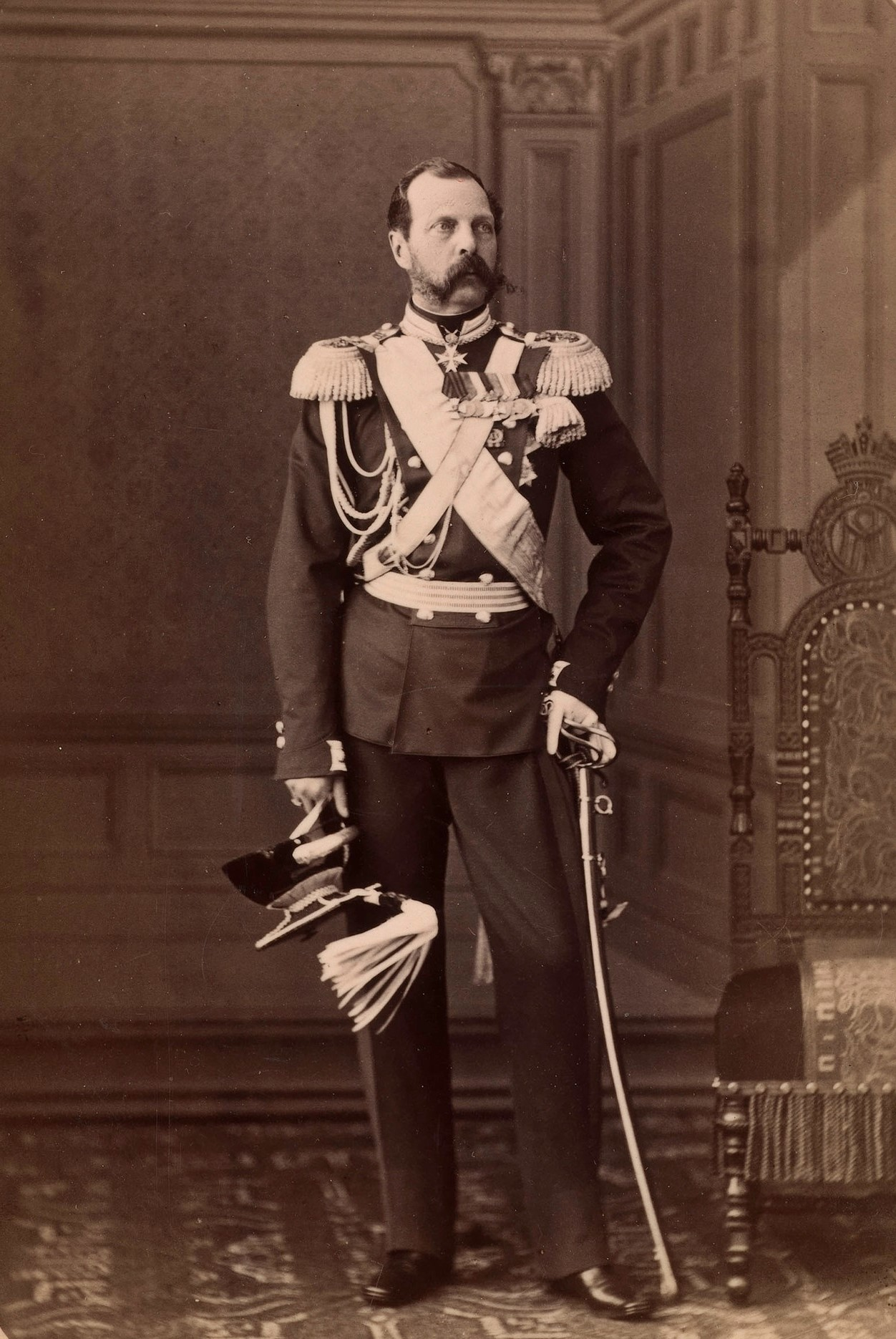
His Imperial Majesty Alexander II

The government reforms imposed by Tsar Alexander II of Russia, often called the Great Reforms (Russian: Великие реформы, romanized: Velikie reformy) by historians, were a series of major social, political, legal and governmental reforms in the Russian Empire carried out in the 1860s.

By far the most important was the emancipation reform of 1861 which freed the 23 million serfs from an inferior legal and social status, and helped them buy farmland. Many other reforms took place, including the:

- Relaxation of censorship of the media
- Judicial reform of Alexander II
- Modernization of the army and navy
- Zemstva and other innovations in local government
- Educational innovations including the expansion and reform of universities, elementary schools and secondary schools
- Reform of the Russian Orthodox Church
- Economic modernization impacting banking, railways, mining, manufacturing
- Emancipation of the peasants in Poland
- Improved the status of Jews.

By 1865 reaction began, and some reforms were cut back. After the tsar's assassination in 1881, his successor Alexander III reversed many reforms.

== Background ==
The Russian Empire in the 19th century was characterized by very conservative and reactionary policies issued by the autocratic tsars. The great exception came during the reign of Alexander II (1855–1881), especially the 1860s. By far the greatest and most unexpected was the abolition of serfdom, which affected 23 million of the Empire's population of 74 million. They belonged to the state, to monasteries and to 104,000 rich gentry landowners—it was the last group that was emancipated first.

As soon as he became tsar Alexander set up numerous commissions that studied various proposals for reforms in practically every area. Experts debated in draft of the proposals, but Alexander made all the final decisions.

While the emancipation of the serfs in 1861 was the most famous and dramatic reform, a host of new reforms affected diverse areas. The tsar appointed Dmitry Milyutin to carry out significant reforms in the Russian armed forces. Further important changes were made concerning industry and commerce, and the new freedom thus afforded produced a large number of limited liability companies. Plans were formed for building a great network of railways, partly to develop the natural resources of the country, and partly to increase its power for defense and attack.

A new judicial administration (1864), based on the French model, introduced security of tenure. A new penal code and a greatly simplified system of civil and criminal procedure also came into operation. Reorganisation of the judiciary occurred to include trial in open court, with judges appointed for life, a jury system and the creation of justices of the peace to deal with minor offences at local level. Legal historian Sir Henry Maine credited Alexander II with the first great attempt since the time of Grotius to codify and humanise the usages of war.

== Role of Tsar Alexander II ==
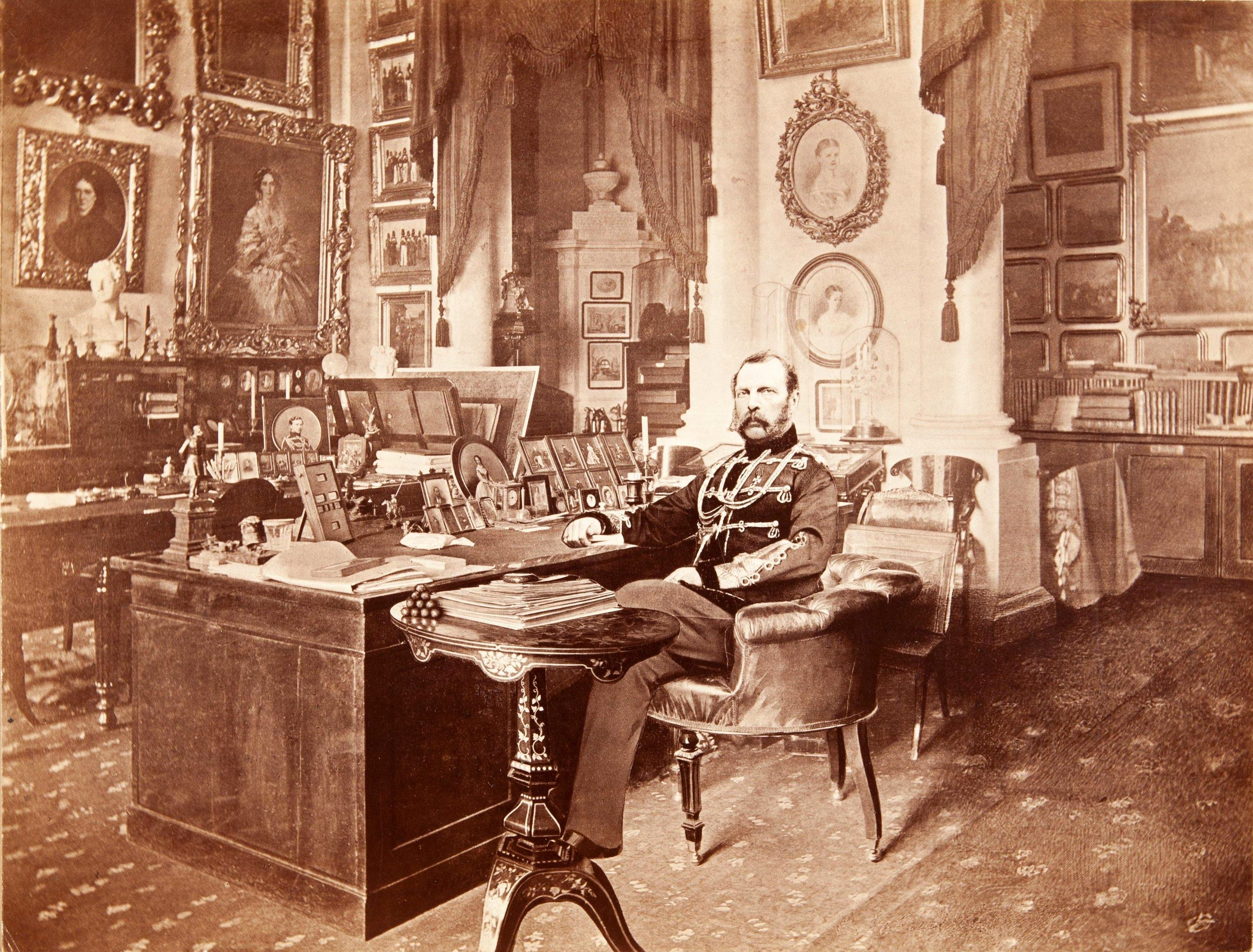
Alexander II

When Alexander II ascended the throne in 1855, the largely peasant conscripted army in the Crimean War was a national disgrace, and clearly demonstrated that despite its large size, the Russian army was no longer competitive to smaller industrial powers such as Britain and France. The demand for reform was widespread, but unorganized. There had been little consideration of how the complex economic, social, political, and legal roles of the service would be ended. The Tsar decided to abolish serfdom from above, setting up a new system whereby the state would be able to purchase farmland from the landowners and sell it to the freed serfs. The Tsar told Moscow nobles: "Better that the reform should come from above than wait until serfdom is abolished from below." Historians have debated Alexander's role. Soviet-era historians downplayed him, as they believed social forces caused history not individuals. Non-Marxist critics say he did not go far enough, especially since he rejected any parliament or duma.

His top advisors included Count Michael von Reutern, Finance Minister 1862–1878, and the brothers Nikolay Milyutin (1818–1872) and Field Marshal Dmitry Milyutin. Minister of War Dmitry Milyutin (1861–81) was responsible for sweeping military reforms. He was also instrumental in creating the framework for the Circassian genocide that led to the deaths of large numbers of Circassian refugees from 1861 to 1865.

Boris Chicherin (1828–1904) was a political philosopher who believed that Russia needed a strong, authoritative government by Alexander to make possible all the important reforms that did take place. He praised Alexander for the range of his fundamental reforms, arguing that the tsar was:

called upon to execute one of the hardest tasks which can confront an autocratic ruler: to completely remodel the enormous state which had been entrusted to his care, to abolish an age-old order founded on slavery, to replace it with civic decency and freedom, to establish justice in a country which had never known the meaning of legality, to redesign the entire administration, to introduce freedom of the press in the context of untrammeled authority, to call new forces to life at every turn and set them on firm legal foundations, to put a repressed and humiliated society on its feet and to give it the chance to flex its muscles.

== Censorship and glasnost ==
In 1858 he removed most of the censorship restrictions on the media—newspapers, magazines, books and pamphlets, resulting in an explosion of new publications. Thus Alexander achieved a degree of "glasnost" or open discussion, as the new media were often filled with discussions of reforms that were urgently needed.

== Serfdom ==
A 1907 painting by Boris Kustodiev depicting Russian serfs listening to the proclamation of the Emancipation Manifesto in 1861

=== Emancipation of the serfs 1861 ===
The emancipation reform of 1861 that freed 23 million serfs was the single most important event in 19th-century Russian history, and the beginning of the end for the landed aristocracy's monopoly of power. The decree ended the feudal obligations owed by serfs and allotted them land. The owners received Treasury bonds, which amounted to liquid capital. The peasants who stayed on the land were obliged to make redemption payments to their obshchina (the village mir, or commune) over a 49-year period.

Besides liberating the serfs from tight control by the gentry, emancipation brought a supply of free labour to the cities—including both peasants and gentry. This stimulated industry by providing a working class and the middle class grew in number and influence. All the land and property turned over to the peasants was owned collectively by the mir, the village community, which divided the land among the peasants and supervised the various holdings. Revolutionaries were not satisfied. They believed that the newly freed serfs were merely being sold into wage slavery by the bourgeoisie. Revolutionaries calling themselves Narodnaya Volya (the People's Will) made multiple attempts to assassinate Alexander II, and they succeeded in 1881.

=== Role of gentry ===
While most of the landowning gentry were conservative, the strong liberal element was more articulate. They vigorously argued that serfdom was severely restricting the entrepreneurial opportunities of the gentry. They proposed that emancipation of the serfs, financed by the government, would provide the gentry and the nobles with capital to invest in the sort of economic opportunities that were being demonstrated in Western Europe. These innovative schemes came especially from the liberal gentry in Tver province. The plan was to use government loan so that freed serfs could purchase farms from the gentry. The gentry would then have the capital to begin entirely new enterprises not restricted by the low returns to farming in the cold Russian climate. In late 1858 Alexander II set up a commission to study emancipation and the liberal ideas proved attractive. However the government bureaucrats shut out the liberals from the actual planning, much to their dismay. A compromise was reached whereby the gentry was given extensive new roles in zemstvos created to operate local government.

=== State serfs ===
The national government also owned serfs, called state serfs until they were emancipated in November 1866. The tsar promulgated a law "On the Land Device State Peasants", allowing the rural society to maintain land in their possession with the rights of "ownership". Redemption from the government of the property holdings was regulated by the law of 12 June 1886. After the implementation of these reforms, plots of state peasants were reduced by 10% in the central provinces and 44% – in the northern. Payments were calculated for 49½ years, and in some cases had to be made before 1931, but were canceled on 1 January 1907 as part of the Stolypin agrarian reform under the influence of the revolution in 1905.

== Judiciary ==
The judicial reforms were among the most successful and consistent of all his reforms. A completely new court system and order of legal proceedings were established. The main results were the introduction of a unified judicial system instead of a cumbersome set of estates of the realm courts, and fundamental changes in criminal trials. The latter included the establishment of the principle of equality of the parties involved, the introduction of public hearings, the jury trial, and a professional advocate that had never existed in Russia. However, there were also problems, as certain obsolete institutions were not covered by the reform. Also, the reform was hindered by extrajudicial punishment, introduced on a widespread scale during the reigns of his successors – Alexander III and Nicholas II.

The judicial reforms started on 20 November 1864, when the tsar signed the decree which enforced four Regulations (Establishment of Judicial Settlements, Regulations of Civil Proceedings, Regulations of Criminal Proceedings, and Regulations of Punishments Imposed by Justices of the Peace). One of the most important results of the reform was wide introduction of jury trials. The jury trial included three professional judges and twelve jurors. A juror had to possess real estate of a certain value. Unlike in modern jury trials, jurors not only could decide whether the defendant was guilty or not guilty but also could decide that the defendant was guilty but not to be punished, as Alexander II believed that justice without morality is wrong. The sentence was rendered by professional judges.

== Military ==
Dmitry Milyutin as war minister, focused on rebuilding a very large, very poor army into one that could compete with modern western armies, as well as deal with ethnic groups on the fringes of the empire. In the old system conscription was compulsorily enforced only for the peasantry. It was for 25 years for serfs, and they were selected by the landowners. The result was an infantry filled primarily with poorly qualified, poorly motivated and incompetent soldiers. The new reforms included universal conscription, introduced for all social classes starting in 1874. Other military reforms included extending the reserve forces and the military district system, which split the Russian states into 15 military districts. Railway planning emphasized strategic lines connecting population centers to likely battlefields. Military education was dramatically improved for the officer corps. Corporal punishment in the military and branding of soldiers as punishment were banned. The first great task of the reconstituted army was defeating the Ottoman Empire and the Balkan wars of 1877. Whilst the war was won, serious failures were discovered at every level of the army from poorly trained companies, to outmoded tactics to dilatory maneuvers, to failures of overall strategy at the top command level.

Naval reforms were also attempted, however inexperienced private Russian shipyards were used to build a modern steel fleet. The Russians tried to save money by inventing their own technology rather than purchasing the latest models from Western Europe. Alexander II also made the mistake of putting his brother in charge of the Navy, and then playing his ministers against each other to save money. Consequently naval programs were poorly coordinated with other ministries. In any case most of the budget went to the Army and Russia was never able to catch up with even the second-tier European naval powers.

== Local government ==
Alexander's bureaucracy instituted an elaborate scheme of local self-government (zemstvo) for the rural districts (1864) and the large towns (1870), with elective assemblies possessing a restricted right of taxation, and a new rural and municipal police under the direction of the Minister of the Interior. All owners of houses, tax-paying merchants and workmen were enrolled on lists in a descending order according to their assessed wealth. The total valuation is then divided into three equal parts, representing three groups of electors very unequal in number, each of which elects an equal number of delegates to the municipal duma. The executive is in the hands of an elective mayor and an uprava, which consists of several members elected by the duma. The gentry played the leading role in most localities, and indeed the new system was designed for them.

== Education ==
Before 1860 Russia had a scattershot educational program that featured a few good universities, but severe limitations in every other area. Planning began in 1858, and the main reforms came in 1863. They extended popular education, opened secondary schools to women and allowed some women to audit University courses. Universities obtained more autonomy, but when small-scale student protests erupted, universities were returned to closer supervision. Private groups opened over 500 Sunday schools, without government funding or supervision, but the government distrusted innovations—such as teaching history—in place of rote language drills and closed them down. Although new funding was not made available, laws in 1864 reformed secondary schools along the lines typical in France and Prussia. Elementary schools likewise were regulated to emphasize religious teaching by Orthodox priests.

== Economy ==
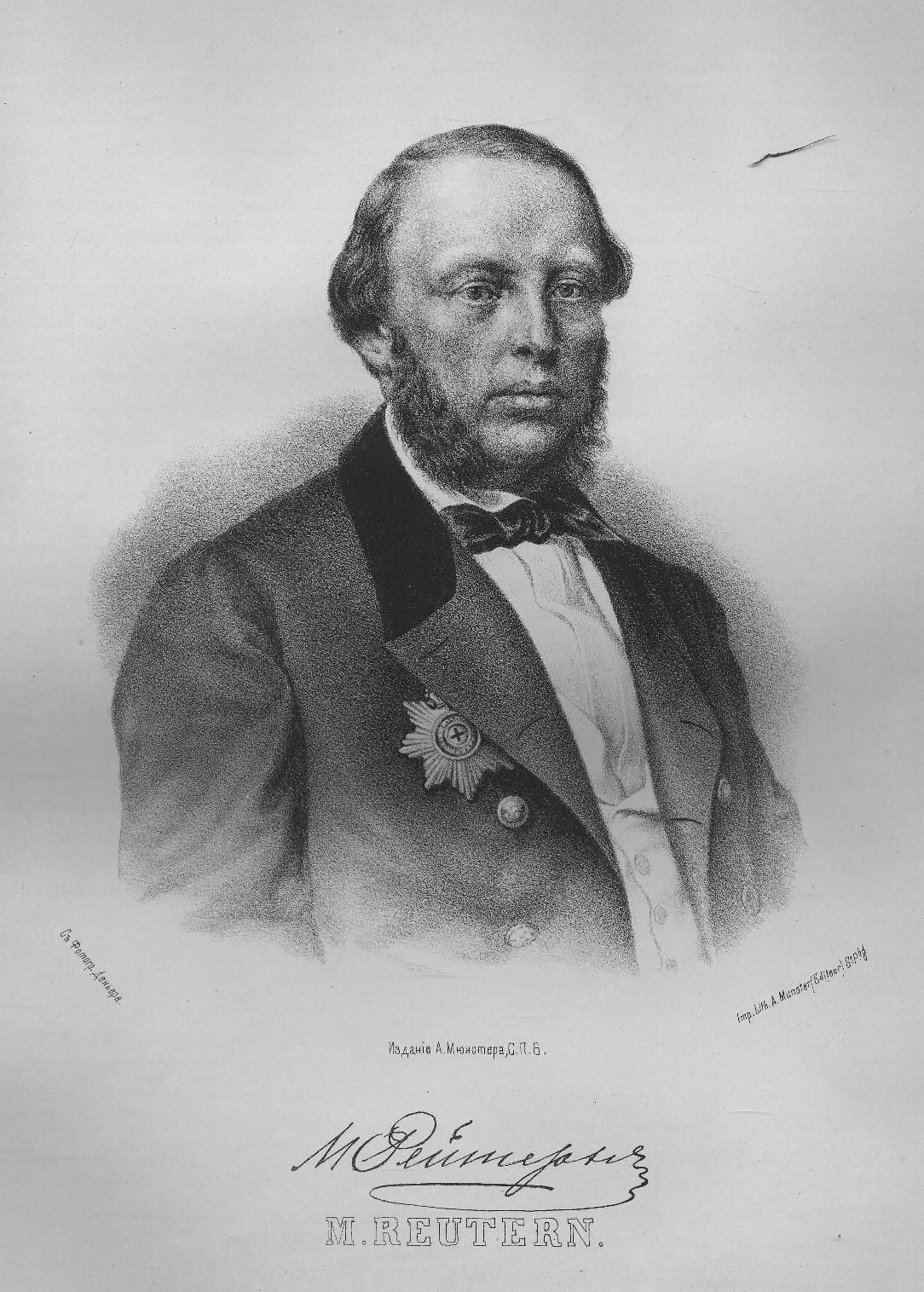
Count Michael von Reutern, Finance Minister, 1862-1878

The extreme difficulties of financing the Crimean War, and the military weakness caused by an ineffective railway system, made economic reforms a high priority. A state bank was founded in 1860, and municipal banks in 1862, as well as savings banks in 1869, all under national supervision. A systematic overhaul of national finances was achieved in 1862 by legislation that created a ministry of finance under Count Michael von Reutern (1862-1878), along with a regular national budget supervised by the finance minister. Reutern installed a uniform system of public accounting for government agencies. Tax collection was no longer handled by private farmers, but became a regular national bureaucratic issue. There was no income tax yet, in fact the poll tax was continued, but the much hated salt tax was abolished. He promoted private credit institutions and stabilised the rouble. Government revenues rose significantly, the chronic budget deficit was eliminated by 1867 and surpluses were achieved from 1873. On trade policy Reutern pragmatically supported reducing some tariffs and duties on manufacturing goods in 1863 and 1868. A balanced budget facilitated borrowing from Western Europe, using state guaranteed railway bonds. This made possible the rapid expansion of the railway system. The Russian-Turkish war ran up deficits and he resigned in 1878.

The new favorable environment encouraged entrepreneurship. In 1860 there were 78 joint stock companies, with a capital of less than 8 million roubles each. Between 1861 and 1873, businessmen set up 357 joint stock companies with a capital of 1.1 billion roubles. They included 73 banks, 53 railways and 163 factories. Foreign capital started arriving for the first time, although massive amounts had to wait for the alliance with France in the 1890s.

== Poland ==
Under Alexander II Polish nobles demanded greater autonomy. This demand was rejected by the Tsar's council. Instead there were new restrictions on internal mobility inside Poland, including requiring passports. In response to unrest the Tsar appointed a moderate Aleksander Wielopolski as chief minister in 1862. Wielopolski was conservative, pro-Russian, a proponent of regaining Poland's pre-1830 autonomy, and a champion of the emancipation of Jews. He adopted a series of liberal reforms in education, for Jews and peasants. He undertook educational reforms, increasing the number of Polish-language schools and establishing in Warsaw the "Main School" (Szkola Glowna, today's University of Warsaw). He also enacted banking-system reforms and agricultural reform for peasants in the form of rents instead of serfdom.

A major revolt broke out in January 1863. It was brutally crushed by the Russian army, despite frequent demands across Europe for leniency and reforms. Nikolay Milyutin was installed as governor and he decided that the best response to the revolt was to make reforms regarding the peasants. Emancipation of the Polish peasantry from their serf-like status took place in 1863, on more generous terms than the Russian emancipation of 1861. However the constitutional's independence of Poland was weakened and the Catholic Church lost its properties. In Warsaw, the official language of instruction was now to be Russian.

== Finland ==
The diet or Parliament of Finland had not met in 55 years, but in 1863 Alexander called it into session. It passed a language law that would make Finnish equal with Swedish in all public business. Mass protests erupted across Finland in 1898 when Tsar Nicholas II reversed the policy and made Russian the official language.

== Jews ==
Under Alexander's rules Jews could not hire Christian servants, could not own land, and were restricted in travel. However special taxes on Jews were eliminated and those who graduated from secondary school were permitted to live outside the Pale of Settlement, and became eligible for state employment. Large numbers of educated Jews moved as soon as possible to Moscow and other major cities. Jews were blamed for the assassination of Alexander II. The backlash was fierce and conditions grew much worse.

== Alaska ==
The Alaska colony was losing money, and would be impossible to defend in wartime against Britain, so in 1867 Russia sold Alaska to the United States for $7.2 million (equivalent to roughly $200 million in current dollars), The Russian administrators, soldiers, settlers, and some of the priests returned home. Others stayed to minister to their native parishioners, who remain members of the Russian Orthodox Church into the 21st century.

== Rejection of a parliament ==
Alexander firmly believed he had the God-given duty to rule as an autocrat, and that he alone understood the best interests of all of the people of Russia. Therefore he rejected any idea of a constitution that would limit his authority, and rejected any parliament or Duma that would take over some of the responsibilities that he alone could perform.

== Ending the reform era and a return to conservatism ==
The first decade of the rule of Alexander II strongly promoted reforms in many areas. In sharp contrast, the remainder of his term after 1865 saw the growing strength of conservatives and reactionaries who reversed or limited many of the reforms. Reactionary elements grew strength from the increasingly violent actions of the revolutionary underground.

Historian Orlando Figes has argued:

Had the liberal spirit of the 1860s continued to pervade the work of government, Russia might have become a Western-style society based upon individual property and liberty upheld by the rule of law. The revolution need not have occurred....There was at least, within the ruling elite, a growing awareness of what was needed....The problem was, however, that the elite was increasingly divided over the desirability of this transformation, and as a result of these divisions it failed to develop a coherent strategy to deal with the challenges of modernization.

== Memory and historiography ==
According to Russian scholar Larisa Zakharova:

The abolition of serfdom in 1861, under Alexander II, and the reforms which followed (local government reforms, the judicial reform, the abolition of corporal punishment, the reform of the military, public education, censorship and others), were a ‘watershed’, ‘a turning point’ in the history of Russia. This is the verdict of the reformers themselves and their opponents, people who lived at the time in Russia as well as beyond its borders, and many researchers. This theme remains crucial for historians. But in particular periods such as during the 1905 Revolution or Gorbachev's perestroika, interest in the history of Alexander II's reforms has acquired a particular topicality and political colouring.

In Russia, the bulk of serious commentary on the emancipation of the serfs was highly favorable before 1917, With Alexander playing a central role. Soviet historians minimized Alexander and the other personalities, arguing that the crisis in feudalism forced the rulers to compromise. The key Leninist interpretation was that the concessions were merely a tactical response to a concerted attack on the status quo by rural masses and their urban allies. Western historians have generally agreed that fear of further upheaval played a minor role in the decision.

== See also ==
- Government reform of Peter the Great
- Government reform of Alexander I
- Reform movement § Russia 1860s
- Stolypin reform
