= Sergei Ivanovich Zarudny =

Russian lawyer and statesman

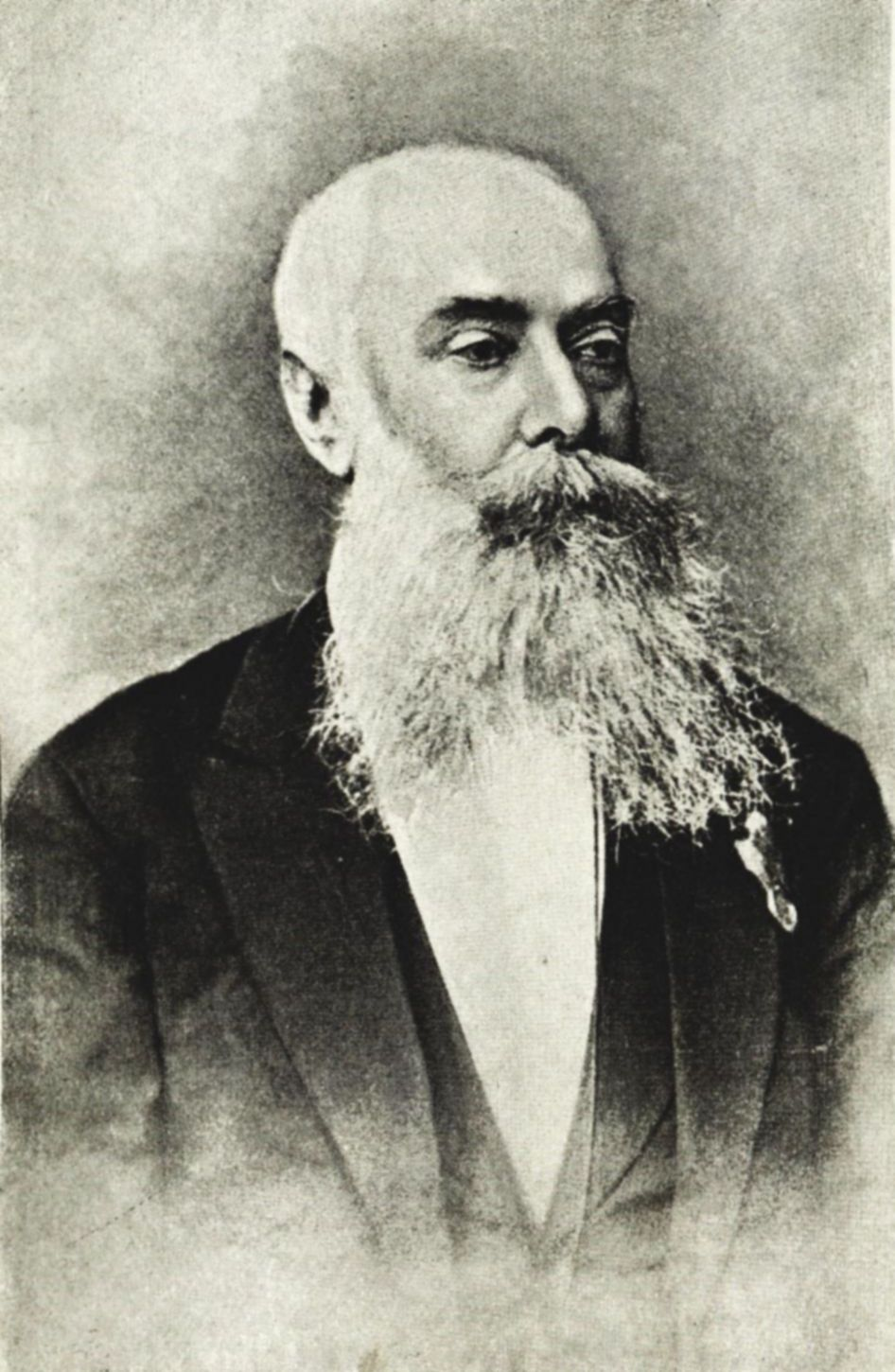
- Sergei Ivanovich Zarudny
- Born: March 29, 1821; Kolodiazne, Russian Empire (now Kupiansk Raion, Kharkiv Oblast, Ukraine)
- Died: December 30, 1887 (aged 66) near Nice, France
- Resting place: Caucade Cemetery, Nice
- Other names: Serhii (in Ukrainian); Sergey, Ivanovych, Zarudnyi (alternate transliterations)
- Citizenship: Russian Empire
- Occupations: legal scholar; lawyer; senator; privy councillor
- Years active: 1842-1887
- Known for: support of the emancipation reform of 1861 key role in writing the Russian Judicial Reform Act of 1864
- Notable work: On the separation of questions of fact from questions of law (1859); General considerations on the composition of the criminal court (1862); On special juries for a special kind of cases in England, France and Italy (1862); Court Statutes with the Reasoning on Which They Are Based (1866); The Civil Code of the Italian Kingdom and Russian Civil Laws. Experience in a Comparative Study of the System of Legislation (1869); The Code of Trade of the Italian Kingdom and Russian Trade Laws. Experience in a Comparative Study of the System of Legislation (1870)
- Children: eight, including Yekaterina and Alexander

Sergei Ivanovich Zarudny (Ukrainian: Сергій Іванович Зарудний, romanized: Serhiy Ivanovych Zarudnyi; Russian: Серге́й Ива́нович Зару́дный; March 29 [O.S. March 17], 1821 – December 30 [O.S. December 18], 1887 ) was a Russian legal scholar, lawyer, senator, and privy councillor in the Russian Empire, mostly during the reign of Alexander II. He was a supporter of the emancipation reform of 1861, which freed serfs; and played a key role in writing the Russian Judicial Reform Act of 1864, which established an independent judiciary and extended the right to a trial by jury to all defendants.

He was born in the village of Kolodiazne in the Russian Empire (now in Kharkiv Oblast, Ukraine), and died near Nice, France.

== Sources ==
- "Sergey Ivanovich Zarudny". State Administration in Russia, deduhova.ru/statesman/ (in Russian). English translation of the above. "Butkov, notifying Zarudny of the subsequent highest gratitude for his efforts in drafting the [Emancipation] decree on February 19 [1861], added that he was 'especially pleased to hand over the highest resolution to Zarudny, as one of the most active participants in the work.' Zarudny valued the gold 'peasant' medal he received at that time above all other awards. ... The closest witness to Zarudny's works [on judicial reform], V.P. Butkov, handing over to him on November 22, 1864 the first copy of the just-printed judicial statutes, indicated in the inscriptions on it that 'the first copy should rightfully belong to Sergey Ivanovich, as the person to whom the new judicial reform in Russia owes its existence more than others.'"
- Dzhanshiyev, Grigory Avetovich (1894). "Zarudny, Sergey Ivanovich". Brockhaus and Efron Encyclopedic Dictionary (in Russian). Vol. 12. pp. 309–312 – via Wikisource. English translation of the above.
- Rumyantsev, Vyacheslav Alekseevich (February 22, 2016). "Sergei Ivanovich Zarudny and Judicial reform in 1864". Journal of the National Academy of Legal Sciences of Ukraine (in Ukrainian) (1). [English abstract, Ukrainian PDF]
- Vernadsky, George (1969). "Chapter 10: The Russian Empire in the Second Half of the 19th Century". A History of Russia (6th rev. ed.). New Haven: Yale University Press. p. 221. ISBN 0-300-00247-5 – via Google Books. "Of no less significance was the judicial reform of 1864, of which Serge Zarudny was the chief promoter. Its basic points were the improvement of court procedure, introduction of the jury system and justices of the peace, and the organization of lawyers into a formal bar. The new courts proved equitable and efficient, and in this respect Russia could be compared favorably with the most progressive European countries. ... Most of the characteristics created by the reforms of Alexander II lasted until 1905, and some until 1917."

== See also ==
- Alexander Sergeyevich Zarudny (1863–1934) – Sergei's oldest son, a lawyer who defended clients in the trials by jury made possible by the 1864 judicial reform his father chiefly wrote; later a Minister of Justice during the [first] Russian Republic.
- Emancipation reform of 1861
- Judicial reform of Alexander II
- Reform movement#Russia 1860s
