= Manifesto on Unshakable Autocracy =

1881 document by Alexander III of Russia

The Manifesto on Unshakable Autocracy was issued by Tsar Alexander III of Russia on 11 May [O.S. 29 April] 1881, about two months after the assassination of his father, Alexander II of Russia. Influenced by, if not written by, Konstantin Pobedonostsev, the Procurator of the Holy Synod, the manifesto rejected the more liberal reforms of his father (and some of his father's ministers) in favor of "unshakable autocracy" which had been given to the tsars as a sacred duty from God. The document summed up Alexander's counter reform policies.

In his book Russia: A 1,000-Year Chronicle Of The Wild East, Martin Sixsmith compared the language of Alexander's document to Ivan the Terrible's coronation speech. Sixsmith says that the "language is strikingly reminiscent of Ivan the Terrible's speech at his coronation in 1547: 'From this day I shall be the sole and absolute ruler, for a kingdom cannot be ruled without an iron hand...Broad and bounteous are our lands, but there is little order in them. Only absolute power can safeguard Russia...'".
