= Alexander Zarudny =

Russian lawyer (1863–1934)

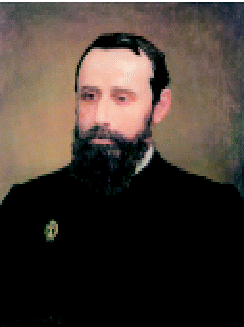
Alexander Zarudny

Alexander Sergeyevich Zarudny (Russian: Алекса́ндр Серге́евич Зару́дный, 31 August [O.S. 19 August] 1863 in Tsarskoye Selo, Russia – 30 November 1934 in Leningrad, Soviet Union) was a Russian lawyer and politician. In 1887 he was arrested regarding the assassination of Alexander II of Russia but was released due to lack of evidence. In 1902-1917 he worked as a lawyer and a judge. Soon he found that his conscience did not square well with the work of a prosecutor or a judge, and devoted himself to defense work in political cases involving miscarriage of justice, press censorship, or mistreatment of ethnic minorities. His colleague, Oskar Grusenberg, likened him to "a one-man rescue squad." Grusenberg recounts that Zarudny once compiled a list of 157 cases he handled all over Russia, from Eastern Siberia to the Caucasus and Moldavia, in the period 1885-1917, and then added, "there were also 265 other cases." He was one of several Russian lawyers who stepped forward gratis to defend Menahem Mendel Beilis, a Jew accused of ritual murder in the infamous Beilis trial. In 1917 he was the Minister for Justice in the Russian Provisional Government but resigned twice. After the October Revolution he was protected by his election as an honorary member of a prestigious Association of Political Convicts, and did some defense work, but soon stopped in frustration and made his living giving lectures throughout the Soviet Union about his courtroom career, to large, enthusiastic audiences.

In Petersburg society in the 1890s, Zarudny was known as "Zarudny furioso" because he was always the life of a party. He was briefly married and had one son, Sergey. Zarudny was remembered fondly by his niece, who recounts his visit to Harbin during a lecture tour. He was a wonderful sleight-of-hand magician, and a natural with young children. When his son married, Zarudny gave the newlyweds his apartment and lived the rest of his life in housing devoted to former political prisoners. Zarudny mentioned in a letter that he had written memoirs, but these memoirs have not yet been found.

== See also ==
- Sergei Ivanovich Zarudny — Alexander's father, chief writer of the Russian Judicial Reform Act of 1864, which (until the October 1917 revolution) gave all Russians the right to trial by jury — the court system in which Alexander worked.
