= Nikolay Milyutin =

Russian statesman (1818–1872)

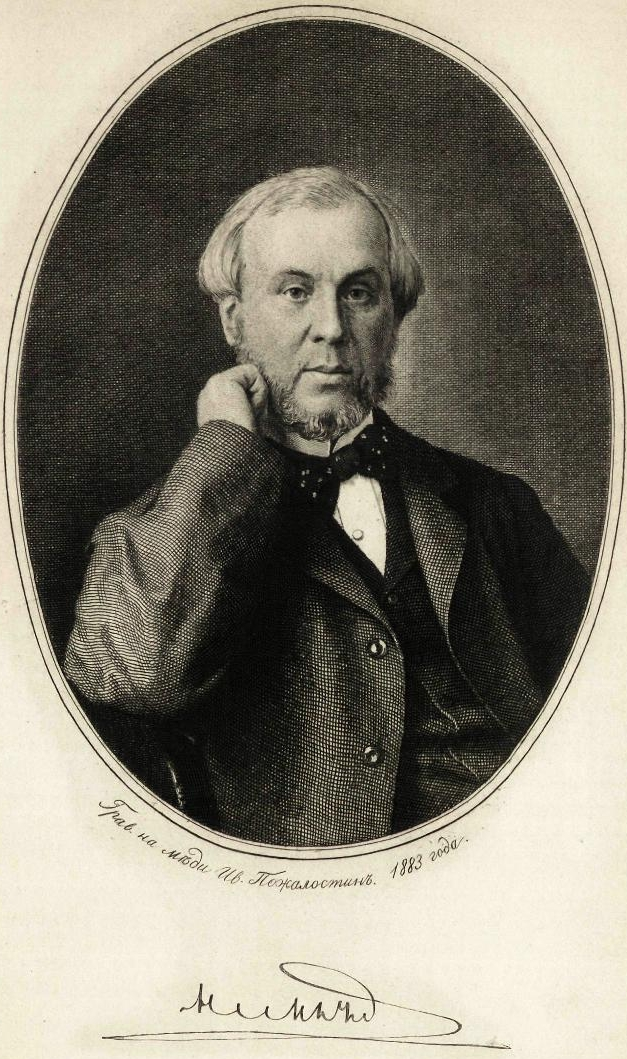
Nikolay Milyutin

Nikolay Alexeyevich Milyutin (Russian: Никола́й Алексе́евич Милю́тин; 6 June 1818 – 26 January 1872) was a Russian statesman remembered as the chief architect of the great liberal reforms undertaken during Alexander II's reign, including the emancipation of the serfs and the establishment of zemstvo.

Peter Kropotkin, an anarchist, described him as "the soul of the emancipation of the Serfs in bureaucratic circles."

== Early life ==
Nikolay Milyutin was born in Moscow on 6 June 1818, the scion of an influential, but impoverished, aristocratic Russian family. He was the nephew of Count Pavel Kiselyov, the most brilliant Russian reformer of Nicholas I's reactionary reign. Milyutin's brothers were Vladimir Milyutin (1826–55), a social philosopher, journalist and economist, and Dmitry Milyutin (1816–1912), who served as Minister of War under Alexander II.

Milyutin's formative years were spent on his father's estate, Titovo, in Kaluga Oblast. Serfs worked the land at Titovo, while Milyutin's father occupied most of his time hunting and carousing with friends. Milyutin's mother was left to oversee most aspects of life on their estate. According to Milyutin, there were so many serfs at Titovo that "to list all would be impossible." While Milyutin largely omitted the more unsavory aspects regarding life at Titovo from his published memoirs, an unpublished draft, detailing his childhood, discusses the brutality with which his father treated his serfs. On one occasion Milyutin witnessed his father "mercilessly" flog one their serfs, as he later explained: "But thus were the mores in those times: a good landowner considered [flogging] unavoidable to keep his serfs in line." Afterwards, as was then common practice, the serf was made to come and "thank the master" for having administered his "lesson." The incident left an indelible impression on Milyutin's young mind.

== Career ==
Milyutin graduated from Moscow University and joined the Ministry of the Interior in 1835. A man of liberal views who sympathized with the Slavophile cause, Milyutin helped reform the municipal administration in St Petersburg, Moscow, and Odessa during the 1840s.

As an Assistant Minister of Interior since 1859, he succeeded in defending his vision of ambitious liberal reforms against attacks by conservatives and disconcerted nobility. The Emancipation Manifesto of 1861 was largely drafted by him. Up to the passage of the act, Milyutin had served as Adjunct of the Minister of the interior, Sergey Lanskoy. However, Milyutin was distrusted by the Czar as "a restless and uncompromising reformer." After passage of this act, though, Milutin was dismissed from office. In regards to the Liberal Party, "As you know, the hopes of the party were dashed to the ground by the dismissal -- one might also say disgrace -- of Nicholas Milutine the day after the [Emancipation] Edict was published..."

During the January Uprising he was dispatched to Poland in order to implement reforms there. He devised a program which involved the emancipation of the peasantry at the expense of the nationalist landowners and the expulsion of Roman Catholic priests from schools. Over seven hundred thousand Polish peasants were granted freehold land to farm as the result of Milyutin's reforms. A Russian university was established at Warsaw, and all secondary school lessons were required to be given in Russian, not Polish. Finally, the property of the Catholic Church was confiscated and sold. Although Milyutin had previously opposed the "direct and outright Russification" of Poland, according to one biographer, historian W. Bruce Lincoln, Milyutin's reforms effectively "hastened the coming of stern Russification policies" in Poland.

Milyutin resigned his office in December 1866, after having suffered a paralytic stroke, and spent the rest of his life in seclusion. He died on 26 January 1872 in Moscow.

== Cultural references ==
- The Filipino novel Revolution: 80 Days (2022) featured Milyutin as a friend of the protagonist Richard Haze.

== See also ==
- Government reforms of Alexander II of Russia
