= Charter to the Gentry =

1785 charter issued by Catherine II

Charter for the Rights, Freedoms, and Privileges of the Noble Russian Gentry also called Charter to the Gentry or Charter to the Nobility was a charter issued in 1785 by the Russian empress Catherine II. The Charter recognized that the gentry owned their landed estates outright and enjoyed the guarantee of civil rights. Significantly, it both established private rights of the gentry, and thereby diminished the rights of the serfs. As Richard Pipes explains:

Although the 1785 Charter referred only to land and made no reference to serfs, it had the effect of turning the latter - tied as they were to the land - into the private property of their landlords. Proprietary serfs constituted at the time approximately one-half of the country's population. Since the tsarist authorities neither laid down any rules governing the powers of the landlords over their serfs nor intervened on the serfs' behalf, they effectively surrendered sovereignty over one-half of the country's population to private interests.

The Charter recognized the corps of nobles in each province as a legal corporate body and stated the rights and privileges bestowed upon its members. The charter was divided into an introduction and four sections:

1. Personal rights and privileges of the gentry.
2. Corporate self-organization of the gentry. Assemblies of Nobility
3. Genealogy books.
4. Documents, establishing nobility.

Notable rights given to the Gentry via the charter include being exempt from taxation, controlling the economic gains of their serfs, being exempt from corporal punishment, allowing them the right to assembly, and allowing them to be tried in their own courts.
