= Nobles' Land Bank =

Bank in the Russian Empire

Nobles' Land Bank (Russian: Дворянский земельный банк) was a bank operating in the Russian Empire founded in 1885. The bank was created to provide cheap loans to Russian landed nobility as the mortgages of their estates.

== History ==
The Nobles' Land Bank was founded in 1885 to maintain the land tenure of hereditary nobles, as a contrast to the Peasants' Land Bank which had been founded in 1883. It was located in St. Petersburg, Admiralty Embankment, house 14.

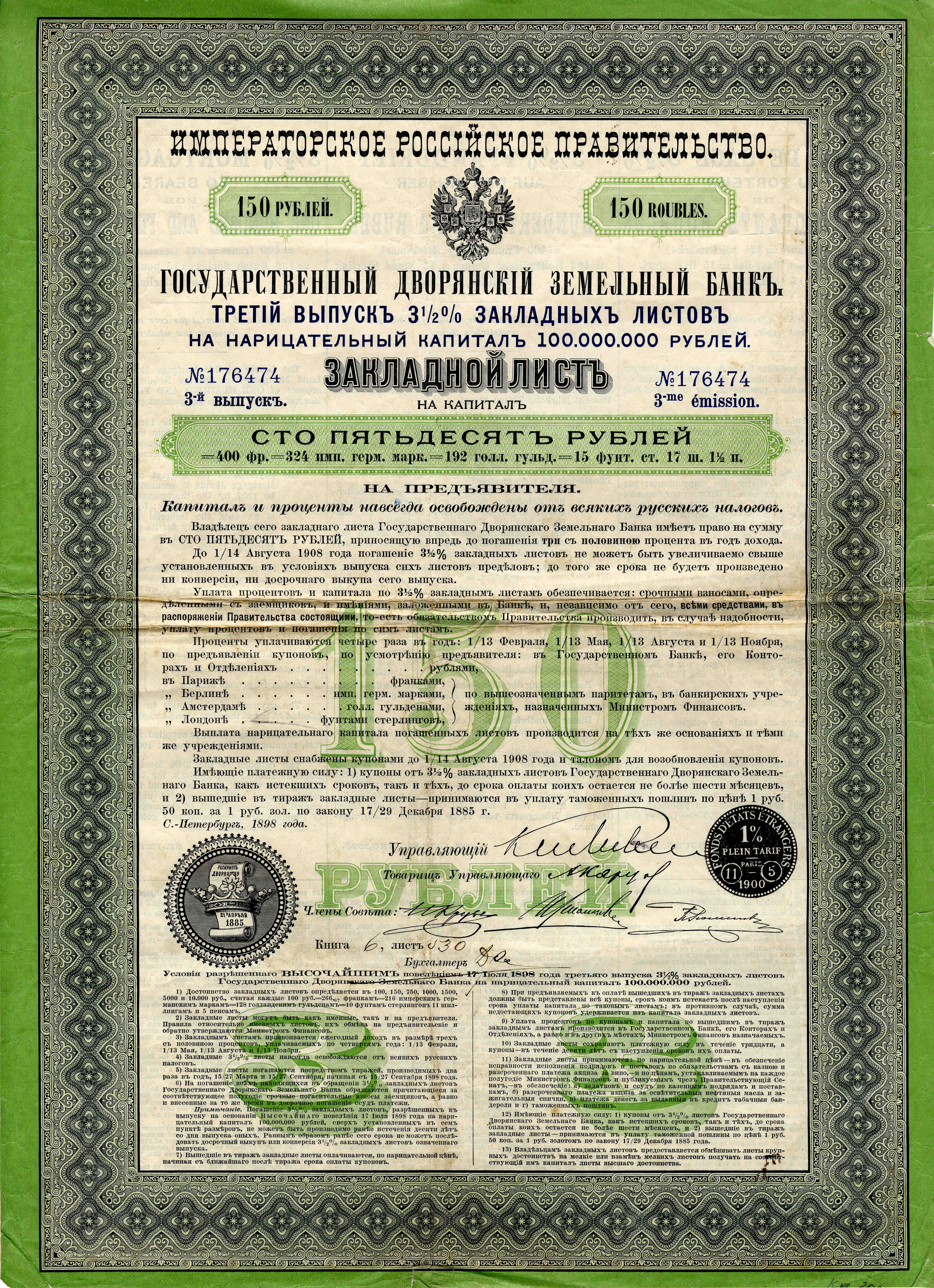
The bank’s 3½% mortgage bond for 150 rubles, third issue (1898).

The bank applied to the European part of the Russian Empire, excluding the Grand Duchy of Finland, the Kingdom of Poland, the Baltic Governorates and the Transcaucasus. The loans were issued to landowners on the security of their land possessions in the amount of 60-75% of the value of land (including burdensome debts). The maximum period of repayment of the loan reached 48 years and 4 months, but was later increased to 51 years, and then up to 66 years and 6 months. In the 1880s the percentage paid on the loan was 5%-6%, and by 1897 it was reduced to 3.5%. Late payments were charged with 0.5% in the first two months and 1% in the next. In accordance with the Regulation of 26 June 1889, the estate could be appointed to auction, but in practice it was not applied.

In 1890, the Noble Land Bank's activities were extended to the Transcaucasus, while in 1894, they were extended to the Western province of the Empire.

On November 25 (N.S. December 8), 1917 the Bank was abolished by the decree of the Council of People's Commissars of the RSFSR.

== See also ==
- Peasants' Land Bank
