= Judicial system of the Russian Empire =

The judicial system of the Russian Empire was established as part of the system of government reforms of Peter the Great.

== Judicial system after 1864 ==
The judicial system of the Russian Empire, existed from the mid-19th century, was established by the "tsar emancipator" Alexander II, by the statute of 20 November 1864.

The new system established — based partly on English, partly on French models — was built up on certain broad principles: the separation of the judicial and administrative functions, the independence of the judges and courts, the publicity of trials and oral procedure, the equality of all classes before the law. Moreover, a democratic element was introduced by the adoption of the jury system and—so far as one order of tribunal was concerned—the election of judges. The establishment of a judicial system on these principles constituted a fundamental change in the conception of the Russian state, which, by placing the administration of justice outside the sphere of the executive power, ceased to be a despotism. This fact made the system especially obnoxious to the bureaucracy, and during the latter years of Alexander II and the reign of Alexander III there was a piecemeal taking back of what had been given. It was reserved for the third Duma, after the revolution, to begin the reversal of this process.

The system established by the law of 1864 was remarkable in that it set up two wholly separate orders of tribunals, each having their own courts of appeal and coming in contact only in the senate, as the supreme court of cassation. The first of these, based on the English model, are the courts of the elected justices of the community, with jurisdiction over petty causes, whether civil or criminal; the second, based on the French model, are the ordinary tribunals of nominated judges, sitting with or without a jury to hear important cases.

=== Justices of the community ===
The justices of the community (Russian: mirovoy sudya, "judge of mir"). They judged minor criminal and civil cases. Justices of the community were individually elected from the ranks of local self-government bodies - Zemstvos in the country districts and municipal dumas in the towns.

Candidates for this office had to meet certain conditions: only the persons with complete secondary school education were eligible, and only the persons with real estate of 15000 rubles in rural districts, 6000 rubles in the capitals and 3000 rubles in other towns. Most of justices were minor landowners. Zemstvos could in some cases elect Justices of the Community irrespective of the property qualification, but in such case election had to be unanimous. Justices of the Community were elected for period of 3 years, and were confirmed in office by Senate. They could not be dismissed during their term in office, except by indictment under process of law.

There were two classes: acting justices and honorary justices. The acting justice sits normally alone to hear, causes in his canton of the community, but, at the request of both parties to a suit, he may call in an honorary justice as assessor or substitute. In all civil cases involving less than 30 roubles, and in criminal cases punishable by no more than three days' arrest, his judgment was final. In other cases appeal can be made to the "assize of the community" (mirovoy syezd), consisting of three or more justices of the community meeting monthly (cf. the English quarter sessions), which acts both as a court of appeal and of cassation. From this again appeal can be made on points of law or disputed procedure to the senate, which may send the case back for retrial by an assize of the community in another district.

=== The ordinary tribunals ===
The ordinary tribunals, in their organization, personnel and procedure, were modelled very closely on those of France. From the town judge (ispravnik), who, in spite of the principle laid down in 1864, combines judicial and administrative functions, an appeal lies (as in the case of the justices of the community) to an assembly of such judges; from these again there is an appeal to the district court, consisting of three judges; from this to the court of appeal (sudebnaya palata); while over this again is the senate, which, as the supreme court of cassation, can send a case for retrial for reason shown. The district court, sitting with a jury, can try criminal cases without appeal, but only by special leave in each case of the court of appeal. The senate, as supreme court of cassation, had two departments, one for civil and one for criminal cases. As a court of justice its main drawback was that it is wholly unable to cope with the vast mass of documents representing appeals from all parts of the empire.

=== Ecclesiastical and volost courts ===
Two important classes in Russia stood more or less outside the competence of the above systems: the clergy and the peasants. The ecclesiastical courts had a jurisdiction over the clergy with its specific procedure. Their interest for the laity lies mainly in the fact that marriage and divorce fall within their competence; and their reform has been postponed largely because the wealthy and corrupt society of the Russian capital preferred a system which makes divorce easily purchasable and avoids at the same time the scandal of publicity.

The case of the peasants is more interesting, and deserves a somewhat more detailed notice. The peasants formed a class apart, untouched by the influence of Western civilization. This fact was recognized by the legislators of 1864, and beneath the statutory tribunals created in that year the special courts of the peasants were suffered to survive. These were indeed but a few years older.

Up to 1861, the date of the emancipation, the peasant serfs had been under the patrimonial jurisdiction of their lords. The edict of emancipation abolished this jurisdiction, and set up instead in each volost a court particular to the peasants, of which the judges and jury, themselves peasants, were elected by the assembly of the volost (volostnoy skhod) each year. In these courts the ordinary written law had little to say; the decisions of the volost courts were based on the local customary law. The justice administered in them was patriarchal and rough, but not ineffective. All civil cases involving less than 100 roubles value were within their competence, and more important cases by consent of the parties. They acted also as police courts in the case of petty thefts, breaches of the community and the like. They were also charged with the maintenance of order in the mir and the family, punishing infractions of the religious law, husbands who beat their wives, and parents who ill-treated their children. The penalty of flogging, preferred by the peasants to fine or imprisonment, was not unknown. The judges were, of course, wholly illiterate, and this tended to throw the ultimate power into the hands of the clerk (pisar) of the court, who was rarely above corruption.

The peasants are not compelled to go to the volost court. They can apply to the police commissaries (stanovoi) or to the justices of the community; but the great distances to be traversed in a country so sparsely populated makes this course highly inconvenient. On the other hand, from the volost court there is no appeal, unless it has acted ultra vires or illegally. In the latter case a court of cassation is provided in the district committee for the affairs of the peasants, which has superseded the assembly of arbiters of the community (mirovye posredniki) established in 1866.
