= Peasants' Land Bank =

Bank in the Russian Empire

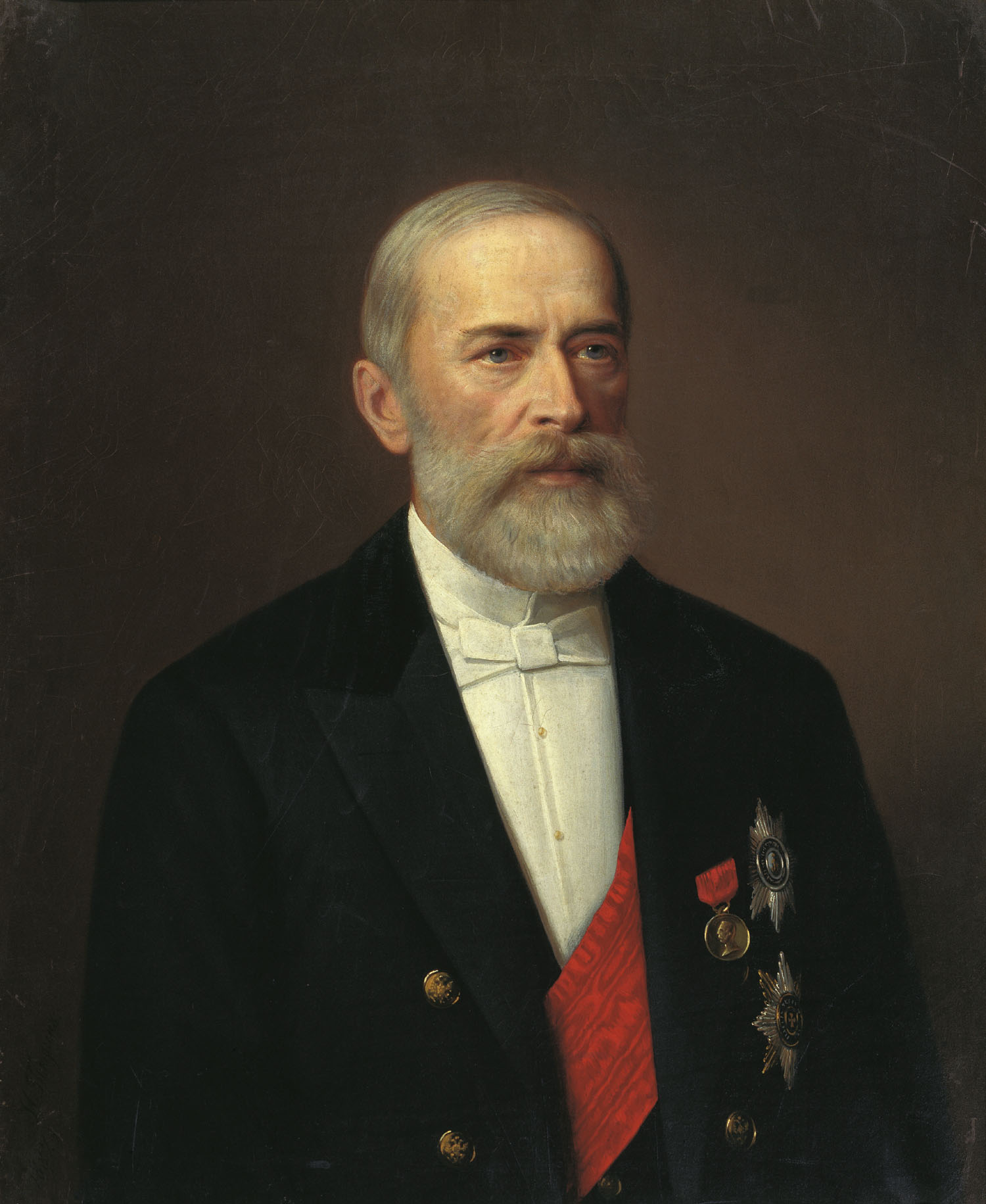
Portrait of Nikolai Bunge (1887), founder of the bank.

The Peasants' Land Bank (Russian: Крестьянский поземельный банк) was a financial institution in the Russian Empire founded by nobles during the reign of Alexander III.

== History ==
The Peasants' Land Bank was created to help peasants purchase their own farms. The Peasants' Land Bank was somewhat limited in its effectiveness by a lack of funding; it was also not nearly as generous as the Nobles' Land Bank, which had lower interest rates. Nikolai von Bunge also abolished the poll tax, which was only paid by peasants, in 1886, which helped to reduce the financial burden the peasants faced.

The bank began operations in April 1883, with nine branches. In 1888, its activity was extended to include the Kingdom of Poland; by 1891, it had thirty-nine branches.

Each bank was managed by a council consisting of: a manager; an assistant manager; three others appointed by the Ministry of Finance; and lastly a member representing the Ministry of Agriculture.

Under Peter Stolypin, the Land Bank was extended to make it easier for the peasants to set up their own farms, and by 1907, 670.3 million roubles had been repaid out of a total of 2,012 million.
