= Judicial reform of Alexander II =

19th-century Russian Empire liberalization

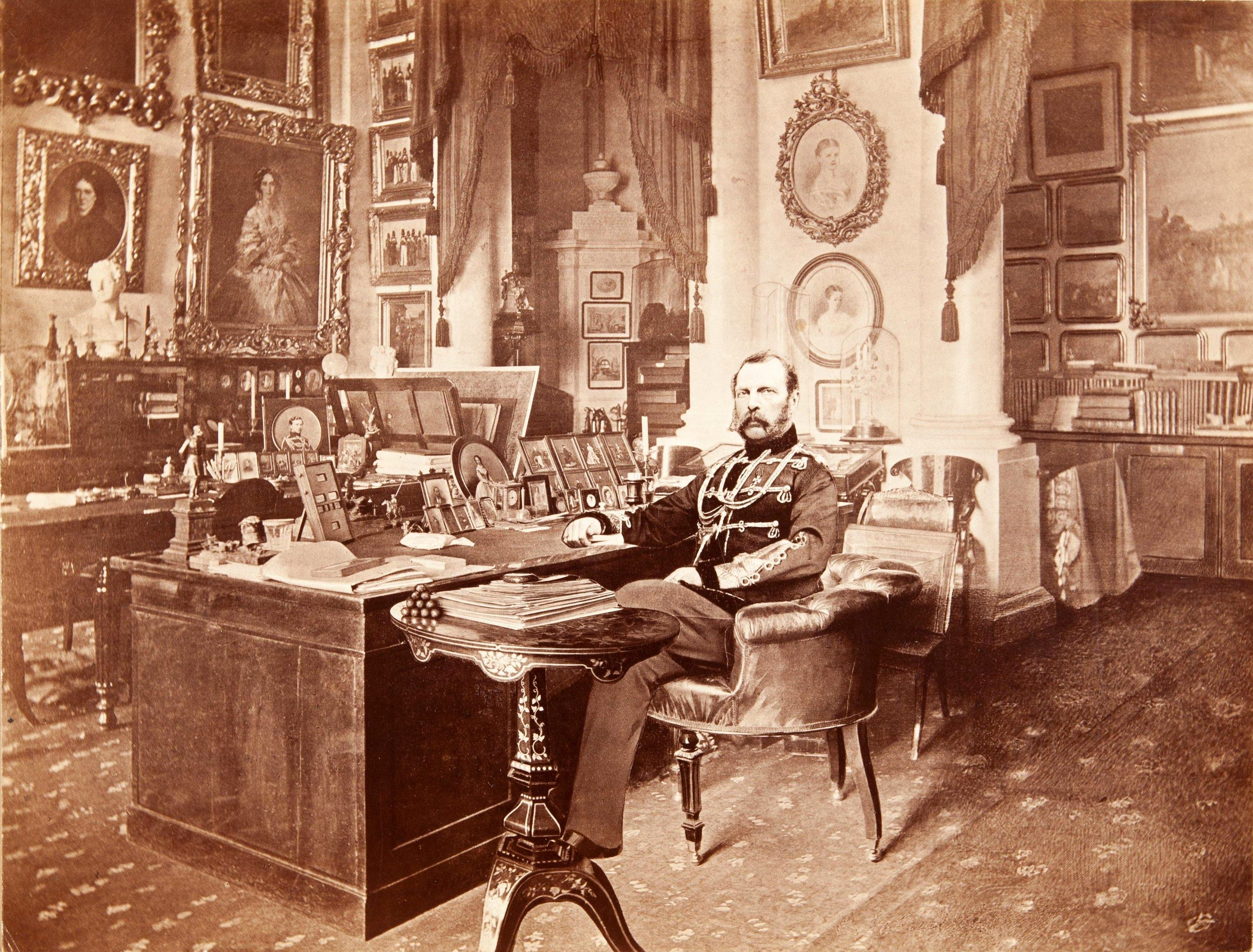
Alexander II

The judicial reform of Alexander II is generally considered one of the most successful and consistent of all his reforms (along with the military reform). A completely new court system and order of legal proceedings were established. The main results were the introduction of a unified judicial system instead of a cumbersome set of estates of the realm courts, and fundamental changes in criminal trials. The latter included the establishment of the principle of equality of the parties involved, the introduction of public hearings, the jury trial, and a professional advocate that had never existed in Russia. However, there were also problems, as certain obsolete institutions were not covered by the reform. Also, the reform was hindered by extrajudicial punishment, introduced on a widespread scale during the reigns of his successors – Alexander III and Nicholas II.

The judicial reforms started on 20 November 1864, when the tsar signed the decree which enforced four Regulations (Establishment of Judicial Settlements, Regulations of Civil Proceedings, Regulations of Criminal Proceedings, and Regulations of Punishments Imposed by Justices of the Peace).

== Court system ==
The court system of Imperial Russia had remained intact since the reign of Catherine II. It included Estates-of-the-realm courts for different estates of the realm. Alexander II introduced a unified two-level system which consisted of General judicial settlements (Общие судебные установления) and Local judicial settlements (Местные судебные установления), where settlement (установление) stands for body or office. Courts were separated from the executive branch.

=== General judicial settlements ===
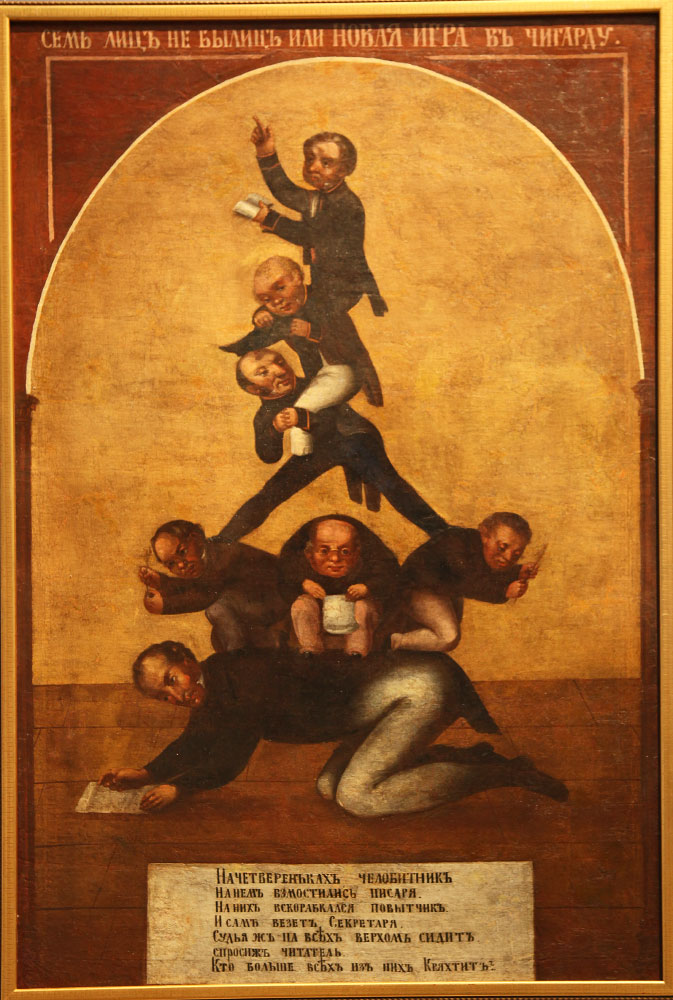
An 1850s caricature ridiculing the pre-reform court system

General judicial settlements included district courts, judicial chambers, and the Senate.

Each district court covered several uyezds. Judges were nominated by the Minister of Justice and appointed by the tsar. A judge had to meet certain requirements, which included a length of service, an immaculate reputation, and a property qualification. There was no fixed tenure for district court judges.

The law provided that different cases depending on the gravity of the offence and on the difficulty of investigation were heard by different boards of judges. The board could include three judges, the judge and the jury or the judge and representatives of the estates. The introduction of representatives of the estates, who enjoyed the same rights as judges, was heavily criticized as inconsistent with unification of court system.

One of the most important results of the reform was wide introduction of jury trials. The jury trial included three professional judges and twelve jurors. A juror had to possess real estate of a certain value. Unlike in modern jury trials, jurors not only could decide whether the defendant was guilty or not guilty but also could decide that the defendant was guilty but not to be punished, as Alexander II believed that justice without morality is wrong. The sentence was rendered by professional judges.

Unlike trials with estate of the realm representatives who could also sit in upper courts, jury trials were held only on the level of district court. Most liberals praised introduction of jury trials-a few intellectuals criticized them. Two examples of such critics can be seen in Leo Tolstoy's Resurrection and Fyodor Dostoyevsky's The Brothers Karamazov. In 1878, the revolutionary Vera Zasulich failed to assassinate St. Petersburg Governor-General Fyodor Trepov, who had ordered a political prisoner to be flogged. Even though it was obvious that Zasulich was guilty, the jury acquitted her completely. The verdict of the jury was based not on the law but on their feeling of injustice committed by Trepov, a case of jury nullification.

Judicial chambers were courts of appeal for cases heard in district courts. They also had original jurisdiction in certain high crimes (usually if the offender was an official). Each judicial chamber covered several guberniyas. Judges were also appointed by the tsar.

The highest court was the Senate. It included the Department of Cassation in civil cases and Department of Cassation in criminal cases. They heard appeals brought on cases heard in lower courts. The Department of Cassation, in criminal cases, was also the court of first instance for the most serious crimes. In 1877, within the Senate, the Disciplinary Commission for judges was established.

The Regulations also provided for an extraordinary Supreme Criminal Court. It was convened if a serious crime was committed by highest officials or for an assassination attempt on the tsar or his relatives.

=== Local judicial settlements ===
The Regulations provided for establishment of local courts with justices of the peace, who were supposed to deal with minor offences and could not impose a sentence over one year of imprisonment. Each justice of the peace was supposed to serve in a circuit, one uyezd comprising several circuits. They were elected for three years by zemstvas. However, in many areas, there were not enough candidates who could meet the requirements for election. In other areas local authorities hindered the process of election. In several Western regions justices of the peace eventually were appointed by the Minister of Justice. In 1889, the whole institution was abolished everywhere except for Moscow and St. Petersburg. The powers of justices of the peace were vested in local executive authorities. They were restored in 1912, but the monarchy was already about to collapse.

Regulations Concerning Peasants Leaving Serf Dependence (Положения о крестьянах выходящих из крепостной зависимости) provided for creation of volost' courts to deal with minor offences committed by the peasants. Judges in such courts were local peasants who had to be literate and not have convictions. They were elected for three years by electors elected by the peasants themselves. Appeals on decisions rendered by volost' courts were lodged to upper rural courts, which consisted of chairmen of local volost' courts. The sentence rendered by an upper rural court had to be supervised either by the justice of the peace or (if none) by local authorities.

=== Court-martial ===
Courts martial existed separately from other courts. The system of courts martial was listed in Court-Martial Regulations 1867. According to it, minor crimes were dealt with in regiment court. The judges were officers appointed by the head of the regiment. In order to enforce the decision, consent of the head of the regiment was required. Grave crimes and appeals were dealt with in district courts martial. The highest instance was the Supreme Court-Martial. The members of the Supreme Court-Martial were appointed by the tsar.

== Improvement of the criminal trial ==
Before the reform, parties in the criminal trial did not have equal rights. The defendant had no legal counsel (legal assistance and legal representation were allowed in civil cases only). There was no distinction between trial in the court and both investigation and trial conducted by police. The judicial reform instituted the modern criminal trial based on the principle of equality of the parties. The defendant was allowed to have legal representation. The defence was now able to search for or provide evidence to the court, and the court itself ceased to perform investigative functions. Its only task was to decide which party presented more convincing evidence. Introduction of jury trials rapidly increased acquittals. The trial, in all courts except for the Senate, was now public.

== Institution of the bar association ==
Prior to 1864, there was no bar association. There were scriveners (стряпчии), who did not have to satisfy any requirements and had very limited powers. The aim of the bar (Russian: Корпорация присяжных поверенных; barrister: присяжный поверенный) was to guarantee that each defendant would have access to qualified legal assistance. Also, one of the tasks of the bar was to give free legal advice to the poor. The bar was an independent corporation which had its own administration in each guberniya (Council of Barristers – Совет присяжных поверенных), which dealt with various organizational matters, imposed various disciplinary penalties on its members (expulsion was common). In 1874 their powers were transferred to local courts, and the independence of the bar was reduced. The new regulations enumerated the requirements for barristers, and the association could refuse entry into the bar without reason.

== See also ==
- Reform movement#Russia 1860s
- Alexander II of Russia
- Emancipation reform of 1861
- History of Russia (1855–92)
- Sergei Ivanovich Zarudny (chief promoter of the judicial reform)
