= Emancipation reform of 1861 =

Edict by Tsar Alexander II abolishing serfdom in the Russian Empire

A 1907 painting by Boris Kustodiev depicting Russian serfs listening to the proclamation of the Emancipation Manifesto in 1861

The emancipation reform of 1861 in Russia, also known as the Edict of Emancipation of Russia, (Russian: Крестьянская реформа 1861 года, romanized: Krestyanskaya reforma 1861 goda – "peasants' reform of 1861") was the first and most important of the liberal reforms enacted during the reign of Emperor Alexander II of Russia. The reform effectively abolished serfdom throughout the Russian Empire.

The 1861 Emancipation Manifesto proclaimed the emancipation of the serfs on private estates and of the domestic (household) serfs. By this edict more than 23 million people received their liberty. Serfs gained the full rights of free citizens, including rights to marry without having to gain consent, to own property and to own a business.

The serfs were emancipated in 1861, a process which took place following a speech given by Tsar Alexander II on 30 March 1856. In Georgia, the emancipation took place later, in 1864, and on much better terms for the nobles than in Russia. State-owned serfs (those living on and working Imperial lands) were emancipated in 1866.

Despite newly acquired freedom, the life of a serf remained grim in many aspects. Household serfs benefited the least, gaining their freedom, but no land. The peasants could only gain land by purchasing it from the landlord.

== Background ==
Just prior to 1861 Russia had three main categories of peasants:

- Those who lived on state lands, many of them under control of the Ministry of State Property. Also included many non-Russians throughout the empire.
- Those who lived on crown domains, the udel
- Those who lived on private land, the so-called estate peasants.

Only those who were owned privately were considered serfs. They comprised an estimated 38% of the population. As well as having obligations to the state, they also were obliged to the landowner, who had great power over their lives.

The rural population lived in households (dvory, singular dvor), gathered as villages (derevni; a derevnya with a church became a selo), run by a mir ('commune', or obshchina in official terms). Imperial Russia had around 20 million dvory, forty percent of them containing six to ten people.

The mir assembly, the skhod (sel'skii skhod), appointed an elder (starosta) and a 'clerk' (pisar) to deal with any external issues. Although there were many regional differences and customs, peasants within a mir in central Russia shared land and resources. The strips were periodically redistributed within the villages to produce level economic conditions. The land, however, was not owned by the mir; the land was the legal property of the 100,000 or so landowners (pomeshchiks, an equivalent of "landed gentry") and the inhabitants, as serfs, were typically not allowed to leave the property where they were born. The peasants were duty-bound to make regular payments in labor and goods. It has been estimated that landowners took at least one third of income and production by the first half of the nineteenth century.

== Earlier reform moves ==
The need for urgent reform was well understood in 19th-century Russia. Much support for it emanated from universities, authors and other intellectual circles. Various projects of emancipation reforms were prepared by Mikhail Speransky, Nikolay Mordvinov, and Pavel Kiselyov. However, conservative or reactionary nobility thwarted their efforts. In Western guberniyas serfdom was abolished early in the century. In Congress Poland, serfdom had been abolished before it became Russian (by Napoleon in 1807), but it was largely restored once Russia took over in 1815. Serfdom was abolished in governorates of Estonia in 1816, in Courland in 1817, and in Livonia in 1819.

In 1797, Paul I of Russia decreed that corvee labor was limited to 3 days a week, and never on Sunday, but this law was not enforced. Beginning in 1801, Alexander I of Russia appointed a committee to study possible emancipation, but its only effect was to prohibit the sale of serfs without their families. Beginning in 1825, Nicholas I of Russia expressed his desire for emancipation on many occasions, and even improved the lives of serfs on state properties, but did not change the condition of serfs on private estates.

== Shaping of the manifesto ==
My intention is to abolish serfdom ... you can yourself understand that the present order of owning souls cannot remain unchanged. It is better to abolish serfdom from above, than to wait for that time when it starts to abolish itself from below. I ask you to think about the best way to carry this out

— Alexander II's speech to the Marshalls of the Nobility, 30 March 1856.

The liberal politicians who stood behind the 1861 manifesto—Nikolay Milyutin, Alexei Strol'man and Yakov Rostovtsev—also recognized that their country was one of a few remaining feudal states in Europe. The pitiful display by Russian forces in the Crimean War left the government acutely aware of the empire's weaknesses. Eager to grow and develop industrial and therefore military and political strength, they introduced a number of economic reforms. It was optimistically hoped that after the abolition the mir would dissolve into individual peasant land owners and the beginnings of a market economy.

Alexander II, unlike his father, was willing to deal with this problem. Moving on from a petition from the Lithuanian provinces, a committee "for ameliorating the condition of the peasants" was founded and the principles of the abolition considered.

The main point at issue was whether the serfs should remain dependent on the landlords, or whether they should be transformed into a class of independent communal proprietors.

The land-owners initially pushed for granting the peasants freedom but not any land. The tsar and his advisers, mindful of 1848 events in Western Europe, were opposed to creating a proletariat and the instability this could bring. But giving the peasants freedom and land seemed to leave the existing land-owners without the large and cheap labour-force they needed to maintain their estates and lifestyles. By 1859 however, a third of their estates and two-thirds of their serfs were mortgaged to the state or noble banks. This was why they had to accept the emancipation.

To 'balance' this, the legislation contained three measures to reduce the potential economic self-sufficiency of the peasants. Firstly a transition period of two years was introduced, during which the peasant was obligated as before to the old land-owner. Secondly large parts of common land were passed to the major land-owners as otrezki ("cut off lands"), making many forests, roads and rivers accessible only for a fee. The third measure was that the serfs must pay the land-owner for their allocation of land in a series of redemption payments, which in turn, were used to compensate the landowners with bonds. The government would advance 75% of the total sum to the land-owner, and then the peasants would repay the government, plus interest, over forty-nine years. The government finally cancelled these redemption payments in 1907.

== Emancipation Manifesto ==
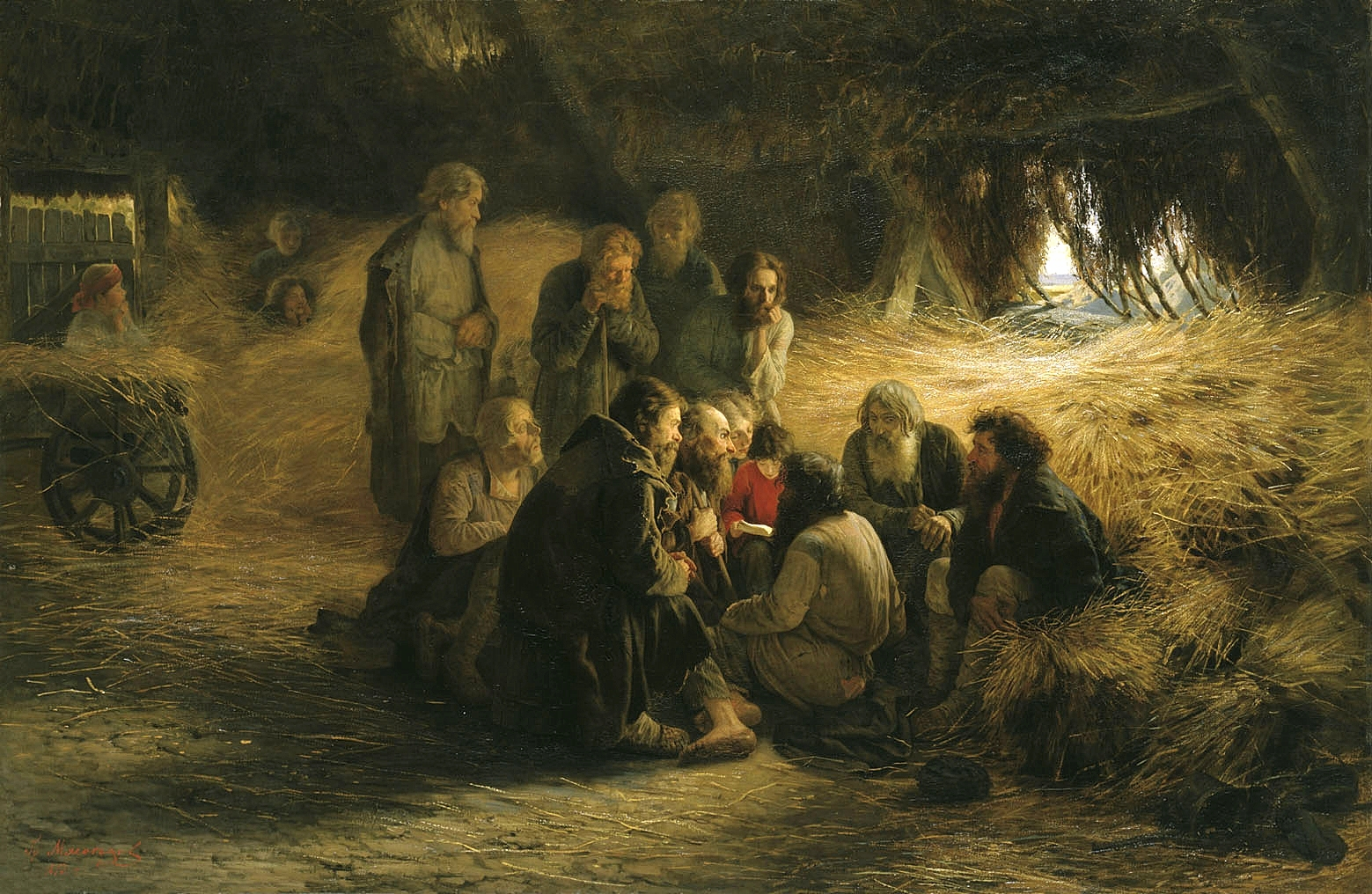
Peasants Reading the Emancipation Manifesto, an 1873 painting by Grigory Myasoyedov

The legal basis of the reform was the Tsar's Emancipation Manifesto of 3 March [O.S. 19 February] 1861, accompanied by the set of legislative acts under the general name Regulations Concerning Peasants Leaving Serf Dependence (Russian: Положения о крестьянах, выходящих из крепостной зависимости Polozheniya o krestyanakh, vykhodyashchikh iz krepostnoi zavisimosti).

This Manifesto proclaimed the emancipation of the serfs on private estates and of the domestic (household) serfs. Serfs were granted the full rights of free citizens, gaining the rights to marry without having to gain consent, to own property and to own a business. The Manifesto also permitted peasants to buy the land from the landlords.

== Implementation ==
Mir communities had the power to distribute the land given to newly freed serfs by the Russian government amongst individuals within the community. Due to the community's ownership of the land, as opposed to the individual's, an individual peasant could not sell his portion of the land to go work in a factory in the city. A peasant was required to pay off long-term loans received by the government. The money from these loans was given to the primary landowner. The land allotted to the recently freed serfs did not include the best land in the country, which remained in the hands of the nobility.

The implementation of land settlement varied over the vast and diverse territory of the Russian Empire, but typically a peasant had rights to buy out about half of the land he cultivated for himself. If he could not afford to pay it off, he would receive a half of the half, i.e., a quarter of the land, free. It was called a pauper's allotment (bednyatskiy nadel).

Many reform-minded peasants believed the manifesto's conditions were unacceptable: "In many localities the peasants refused to believe that the manifesto was genuine. There were troubles, and troops had to be called in to disperse the angry crowds." The land-owners and nobility were paid in government bonds, with their debts deducted. The bonds soon fell in value. The management skills of the land-owners were generally poor.

Some mirs did not enter the land redemption process at all, remaining as temporarily obligated peasants under their former owners until an 1881 decree made redemption compulsory. In 1883, concerned by rising levels of tax arrears, the government made a 13% cut (varying by commune, as a national average) to payment rates to combat the problem.

== Outcomes ==
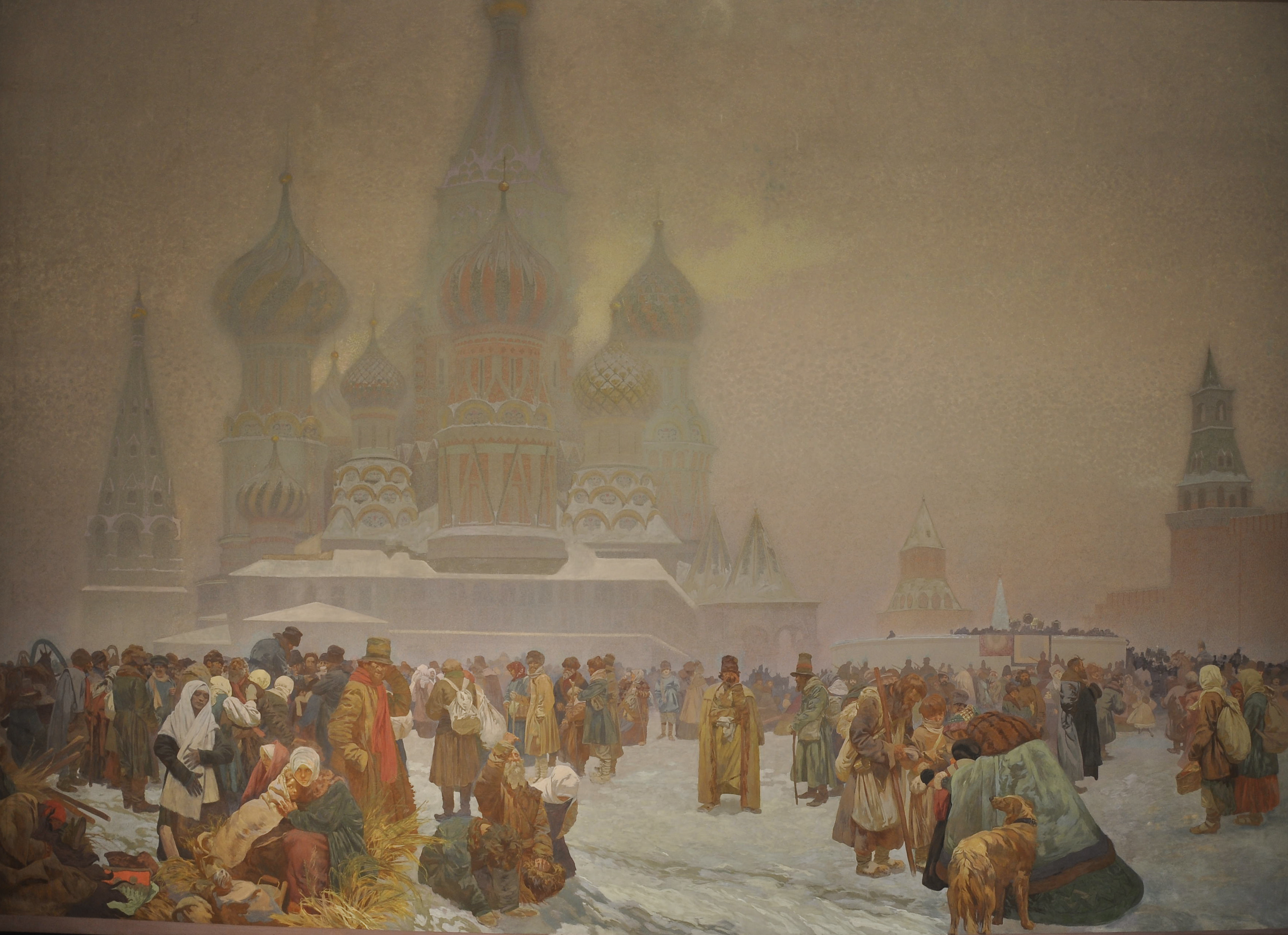
The Abolition of Serfdom in Russia: Work in Freedom is the Foundation of a State (1914), by Alphonse Mucha, The Slav Epic

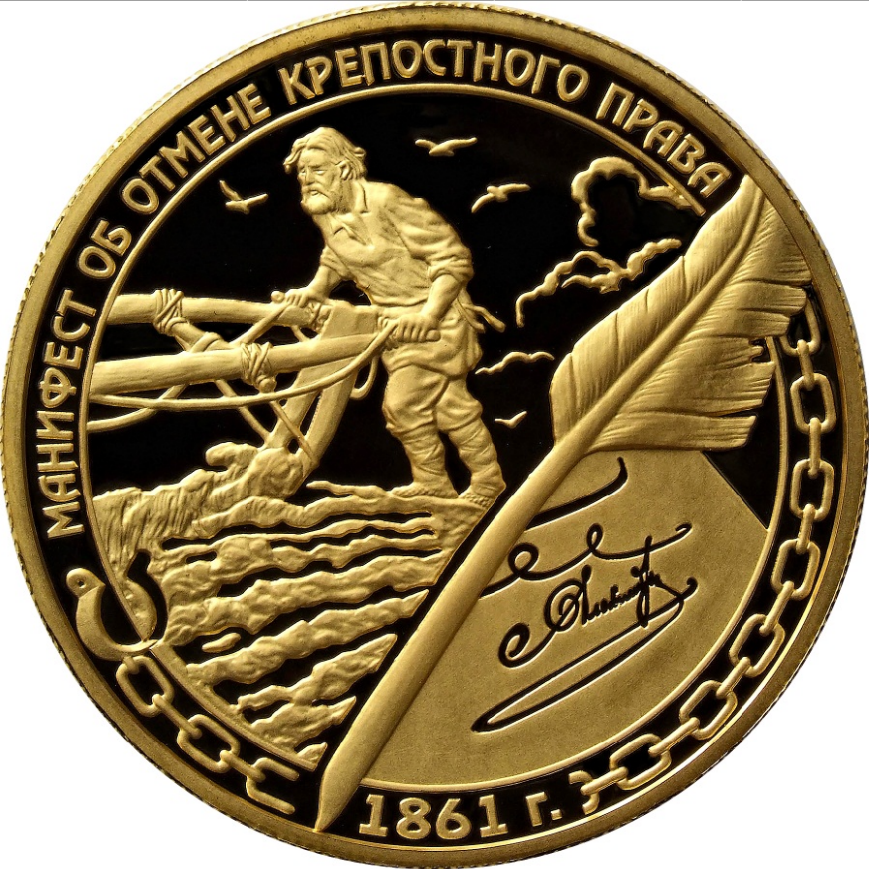
Central Bank of Russia coin commemorating the 150th anniversary of the emancipation reform

Despite newly acquired freedom, the life of a serf remained grim in many aspects. Household serfs benefited the least, gaining their freedom, but no land. Many bureaucrats believed that these reforms would bring about drastic changes that would only affect the "lower stories" of society, strengthening the autocracy. In reality, the reforms forced the monarch to coexist with an independent court, free press, and local governments—all operating differently and more freely than they had in the past. This new form of local government involved in each area an assembly called a zemstvo. In regards to new localized government, the reforms put in place a system where the landowners were now able to have more of a say within their newly formed "provinces". While this was not the direct intent of the reforms, it was evident that this significantly weakened the idea of the autocracy. Now, the "well-to-do" serfs, along with previously free peoples, were able to purchase land as private property. While early in the reforms the creation of local government had not changed many things about Russian society, the rise in capitalism drastically affected not only the social structure of Russia, but the behaviors and activities of the self-government institutions. With new, capitalistic ideals, local government was not responsible for the rules and regulations dictating how the new market would operate. If there was a positive of this movement towards localized government, from the autocracy's point of view; it was (as Petr Valuev put it): the zemstvo would "provide activity for the considerable portion of the press as well as those malcontents who currently stir up trouble because they have nothing to do".

=== Effects on the serfs ===
The serfs of private estates received less land than they needed to survive, which led to civil unrest. The redemption tax was so high that the serfs had to sell all the grain they produced to pay the tax, which left nothing for their survival. Landowners also suffered because many of them were deeply in debt, and the forced selling of their land left them struggling to maintain their lavish lifestyle. In many cases, the newly freed serfs were forced to "rent" their land from wealthy landowners. Furthermore, when the peasants had to work for the same landowners to pay their "labor payments", they often neglected their own fields. Over the next few years, the yields from the peasants' crops remained low, and soon famine struck a large portion of Russia. With little food, and finding themselves in a similar condition as when they were serfs, many peasants started to voice their disdain for the new social system. On one occasion, on 12 April 1861, a local leader murdered a large number of uprising peasants in the village of Bezdna. When the incident was over, the official report counted 70 peasants dead and another 100 wounded. After further investigation, and trial of some members of the uprising, five peasants were found guilty of "agitation" and not uprising. That said, several different instances did take the form of an uprising.

=== Aftermath ===
In Congress Poland and in northern Russia peasants became both free and landless (batraks), with only their labour to sell, while in other areas peasants became the majority land-owners in their province(s). The 1861 Emancipation Manifesto affected only the privately owned serfs. The state-owned serfs were emancipated in 1866 and were given better and larger plots of land.

The reforms changed the Russian economy. The individuals who led the reform favored an economic system similar to that in other European countries, which promoted the ideas of capitalism and free trade. The reformers aimed to promote development and to encourage the ownership of private property, free competition, entrepreneurship, and hired labor. This they hoped would bring about an economic system with minimal regulations and tariffs, thus a more "laissez-faire" economy. Soon after the reforms there was a substantial rise in the amount of production of grain for sale. Because of this there was also a rise in the number of hired laborers and in farm machinery. Furthermore, an indicator of the change to the Russian economy post-reform was the huge growth in non-gentry private landownership. While the gentry land-holdings fell from 80% to 50%, the peasant holdings grew from 5% to 20%.

== See also ==
- Free ploughman
- Serfdom in Russia
- Government reforms of Alexander II of Russia
- Reform movement#Russia, 1860s
- Stolypin reform
- Judicial reform of Alexander II
- Bezdna Unrest
- Slave Trade Acts
- Thirteenth Amendment to the United States Constitution
- Economy of the Russian Empire#Abolition of serfdom
- Lord and Peasant in Russia from the Ninth to the Nineteenth Century
