= Mikhail Loris-Melikov =

Russian statesman (1824–1888)

General Count Mikhail Loris-Melikov
- Михаил Лорис-Меликов; Միքայել Լոռու-Մելիքյան
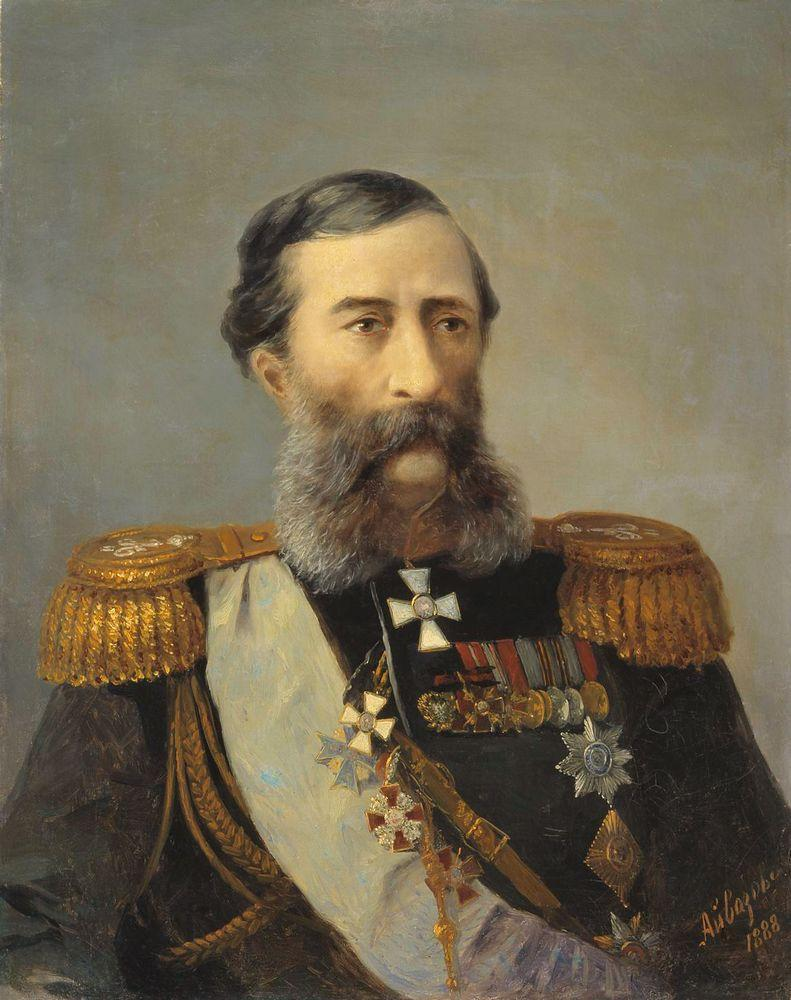
- Portrait by Ivan Aivazovsky, 1888

Interior Minister of Russia
- In office 6 August 1880 – 4 May 1881
- Monarchs: Alexander II; Alexander III
- Preceded by: Lev Makov
- Succeeded by: Nikolay Ignatyev

Personal details
- Born: 21 October 1824 Tiflis, Caucasus Viceroyalty, Russian Empire
- Died: 24 December 1888 (aged 64) Nice, France
- Resting place: St. Gevorg Armenian Church, Tbilisi, Georgia
- Spouse: Princess Nina Ivanovna Argutinska-Dolgorukova
- Awards: Order of Saint Anna; Order of Saint Vladimir; Order of Saint Stanislaus; Order of the White Eagle

Military service
- Allegiance: Russia
- Branch/service: Imperial Russian Army
- Rank: General of the Cavalry; Adjutant general
- Unit: IX Russian Army Corps
- Battles/wars: Caucasian War; Crimean War; Russo-Turkish War; Battle of Kars; Battle of Kızıl Tepe; Battle of Aladzha

Count Mikhail Tarielovich Loris-Melikov (Russian: Михаил Тариелович Лорис-Меликов; Armenian: Միքայել Լոռու-Մելիքյան; 21 October [O.S. 9 October] 1824 – 24 December 1888) was a Russian statesman of an Armenian origin who served as general of the cavalry and adjutant general of His Imperial Majesty's Retinue.

The princes of Lori, Loris-Melikov, are the representatives of an old noble family whose ancestors in the 14th century owned the town of Lori and the province of the same name. They belonged to the top aristocratic society of Georgia. The princely family of Loris-Melikov was established in the Russian nobility in 1832.

== Biography ==
=== Early life ===
He was born in Tiflis, Caucasus Viceroyalty, Russian Empire, in 1826, into the Melikov family of Armenian origin, to Prince Tariel Zurabovich Loris-Melikov and his wife, Princess Ekaterina Ahverdova, and was educated in Saint Petersburg, first at the Lazarev Institute of Oriental Languages, and afterwards at the Guards' Cadet Institute. While at the Lazarev Institute, a practical joke against one of his instructors landed him in hot water and led to his expulsion from the school.

He joined a hussar regiment, and four years afterwards (1847) he was sent to the Caucasus, where he remained for more than twenty years, and made for himself during troubled times the reputation of a distinguished cavalry officer and an able administrator. In the latter capacity, though a keen soldier, he aimed always at preparing the warlike and turbulent population committed to his charge for the transition from military to normal civil administration, and in this work, his favorite instrument was the schoolmaster.

=== Military career ===
Loris-Melikov first saw action against the forces of another power during the Crimean War. He served as the commander of a cavalry squadron on the Russo-Ottoman borderlands and took part in the battles at Bayandur, Aleksandropol, and Kars. He was recognized for his military exploits and promoted to major general.

During the Russo-Ottoman War of 1877–1878, he served as the chief of staff of Grand Duke Michael. At the rank of adjutant-general, he was given command of the Aleksandropol Detachment on the frontier with the Ottoman (a force that amounted to 32 battalions, four squadrons, and 112 field guns). After taking the fortress of Ardahan, he was repulsed by Ahmed Muhtar Pasha at Zevin, but subsequently defeated his opponent at Ajaria, took Kars by storm, and laid siege to Erzurum. For these services, he received the title of count. He was awarded the Order of Saint George of the second degree on October 27, 1877, for his service in Ajaria.

=== Civil administrator ===
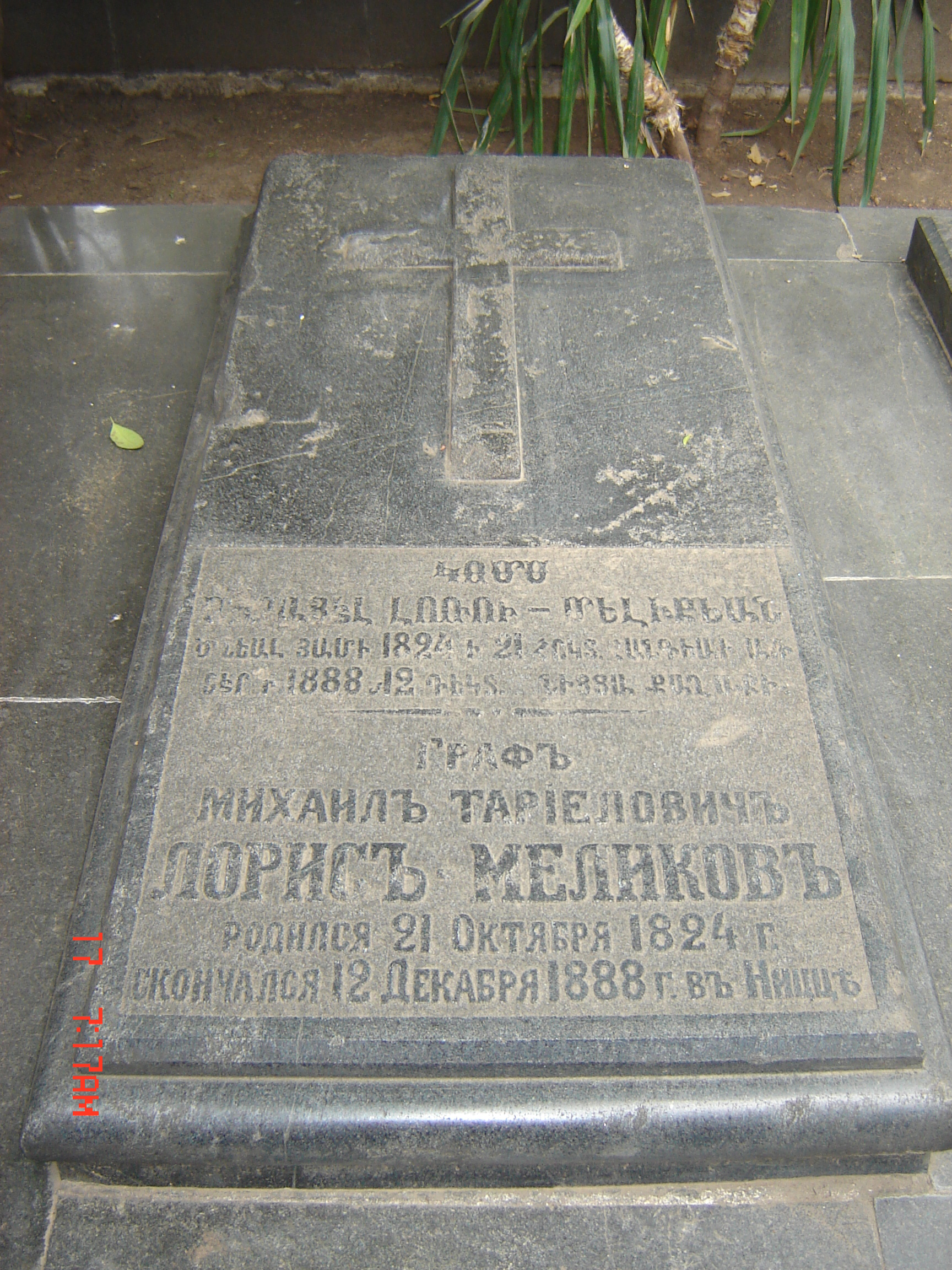
Tombstone of Mikhail Tarielovich Loris-Melikov. Pantheon of St. Kevork Armenian Apostolic Church, Tbilisi, Georgia.

In the following year, Loris-Melikov became the temporary governor-general of the region of the Lower Volga to combat an outbreak of the plague. The measures he adopted proved so effectual that he was transferred to the provinces of Central Russia to combat the Nihilists and Anarchists, who had adopted a policy of terrorism and had succeeded in assassinating the governor of Kharkov.

His success in this struggle has led to his appointment as chief of the Supreme Administrative Commission, which had been created in St Petersburg after the February 1880 assassination attempt on Alexander II to deal with the terrorist agitation in general.

Here, as in the Caucasus, he showed a decided preference for the employment of ordinary legal methods rather than exceptional extralegal measures, even after an attempt on his own life soon afterwards. He believed that the best policy was to strike at the root of the evil by removing the causes of popular discontent and recommended to the emperor, Alexander II, a large scheme of administrative and economic reforms. Alexander, who was beginning to lose faith in the efficacy of the simple method of police repression hitherto employed, lent a willing ear to the suggestion. When the Supreme Commission was dissolved in August 1880, he appointed Count Loris-Melikov as the minister of the Interior with exceptional powers.

The proposed scheme of reforms was at once taken in hand but was never to be carried out. The emperor signed a ukase creating several commissions, composed of officials and eminent private individuals, to prepare reforms in various branches of the administration, and while popular people's representatives from the Zemstvos were granted positions, they were not allowed to vote. The intellectuals of Russia derided these reforms as rubber-stamping and an unwillingness to put forward any substantial constitutional reforms. This ukase was designed and advocated by Loris-Melikov, and on the very day (13 March 1881) of its acceptance by the emperor, the emperor was assassinated. But after the assassination, Loris-Melikov hesitated about publishing the order for a popular commission, and waited for the new emperor, who turned out to be very opposed to the Constitution in Russia. Alexander III at once adopted a strongly anti-reformist policy.

When the new emperor started to undo some of the reforms that his father, Alexander II, had promulgated, Loris-Melikov resigned and lived in retirement until he died in Nice on 22 December 1888.

== Popular culture ==
Loris-Melikov is portrayed as a generally sympathetic character in Leo Tolstoy's historical novella on the Caucasian War in Hadji Murat.

== Awards ==
- Golden Weapon for Bravery (1848)
- Order of Saint Anna 4th degree (20.07.1848)
- Order of Saint Anna 3rd degree (03.07.1850)
- Order of Saint Anna 2nd degree (25.01.1852)
- Golden Weapon for Bravery (28.02.1854)
- Order of Saint Vladimir 4th degree (15.05.1854)
- Order of Saint Vladimir 3rd degree (20.10.1855)
- Order of Saint Stanislaus 1st degree (06.06.1859)
- Order of Saint Anna 1st degree (26.06.1860)
- Order of Saint Vladimir 2nd degree (13.10.1861)
- Order of the White Eagle (19.04.1865)
- Order of Saint Alexander Nevsky (30.08.1869)
- Diamond insignia for the Order of Saint Alexander Nevsky (08.09.1871)
- Order of St. George 3rd degree (14.05.1877)
- Order of St. George 2nd degree (27.10.1877)
- Order of Saint Vladimir 1st degree (14.11.1877)
- Order of St. Andrew (30.08.1880)

=== Foreign ===
- Turkish Order of the Medjidie 2nd degree (1858)
- Mecklenburg-Schwerin Order of the Wendish Crown 2-й степени (1878)
- «Pour le Mérite» (1878)
- Montenegrin medal (1878)

Honorary Member Russian Academy of Sciences (29.12.1880).

== See also ==
- Melikov

== Notes ==
Government offices
Preceded by Lev Makov	Minister of Interior; 1880–1881	Succeeded by Nikolay Ignatyev
