= Loris-Melikov's constitutional reform =

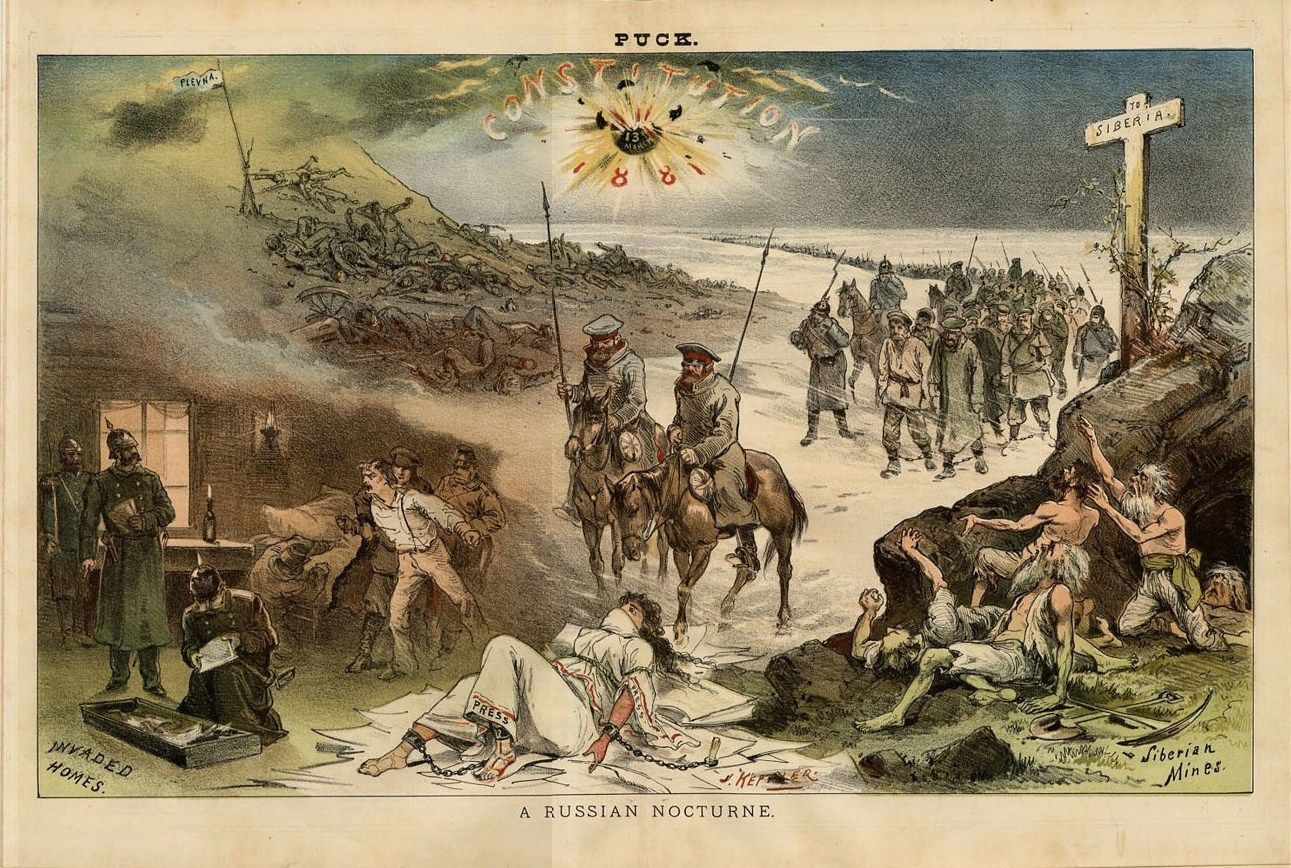
The political cartoon from Puck shows the hope at the time that the proposed Constitution of 1881 would burst light over the Russian Nocturne which contained invaded homes, a chained down press, people sent to Siberia to work in the mines, and the suffering of war.

"Loris-Melikov's constitution" (Russian: Конституция Лорис-Меликова) was a planned but unimplemented political reform suggested by count Mikhail Loris-Melikov. It was introduced to the Russian Emperor, Alexander II, in January 1881.

Even though the reform contained the word "constitution", the project suggested only timid steps towards a constitutional monarchy. The main idea was to make people cooperate with the government. For this, Loris-Melikov suggested that they allow a few representatives of the commons to be presented in the legislative institutions with the granted advisory rights. The right of legislative initiative was supposed to be retained by the monarch. Despite the fact that the project was later known as a "constitutional reform", in reality, it contained nothing that could justify this label. When it was presented to the emperor, the author emphasized that his proposal had nothing in common with the "western constitutional formats". Though the reforms were conservative in practice, their significance lay in the value Alexander II attributed to them: "I have given my approval, but I do not hide from myself the fact that it is the first step towards a constitution."

The project was presented to Alexander II on 28 January 1881, and was unanimously approved on 16 February by the Exclusive consultation (Alexander II also participated). On 1 March 1881, the emperor told Loris-Melikov that the project would be discussed in 4 days by the Council of Ministers. Two hours later, Alexander II was assassinated.

The new emperor, Alexander III, by the advice of Konstantin Pobedonostsev, immediately dismissed Loris-Melikov and his project and started the implementation of conservative counter-reforms. On the top of the project (preserved in the State Archive of the Russian Federation) he put down:

"Thank God, this culpable and hurried step towards the Constitution was not implemented, and this fantasy project was rejected by the Council of Ministers by quite a small minority."

In 1904, the project of the constitution, including Loris-Melikov's private correspondence, was published in Berlin by Maksim Kovalevsky. It was Kovalevsky's opinion that the project was just a humble attempt to reconcile the cultural classes with bureaucracy and absolutism. Kovlevsky felt that the failure of the reforms made the future of the peaceful development of the Russian people and the finalization of the Great reforms impossible.

In May 1882, the new minister of the internal affairs, Nikolay Pavlovich Ignatyev, raised the agenda about a representative assembly again, this time in the form of a reanimated Zemsky Sobor. The project was prepared by Pavel Golohvastov with the help of Ivan Aksakov, and it was clearly influenced by Slavophilia ideas. However, the story was repeated and the project was not approved by Pobedonostsev. The author lost his office. Two years later, Pobedonostsev wrote to the emperor:

"Blood runs cold in a Russian human only by a sole thought what could have happened if Loris-Melikov's project — or the one suggested by his friends — had been implemented. The fantasy of Ignatyev was even more absurd, though it was covered with a specious form of Zemsky Sobor."
