= Alexander II of Russia =

Emperor of Russia from 1855 to 1881

Alexander II
- King of Poland; Grand Duke of Finland
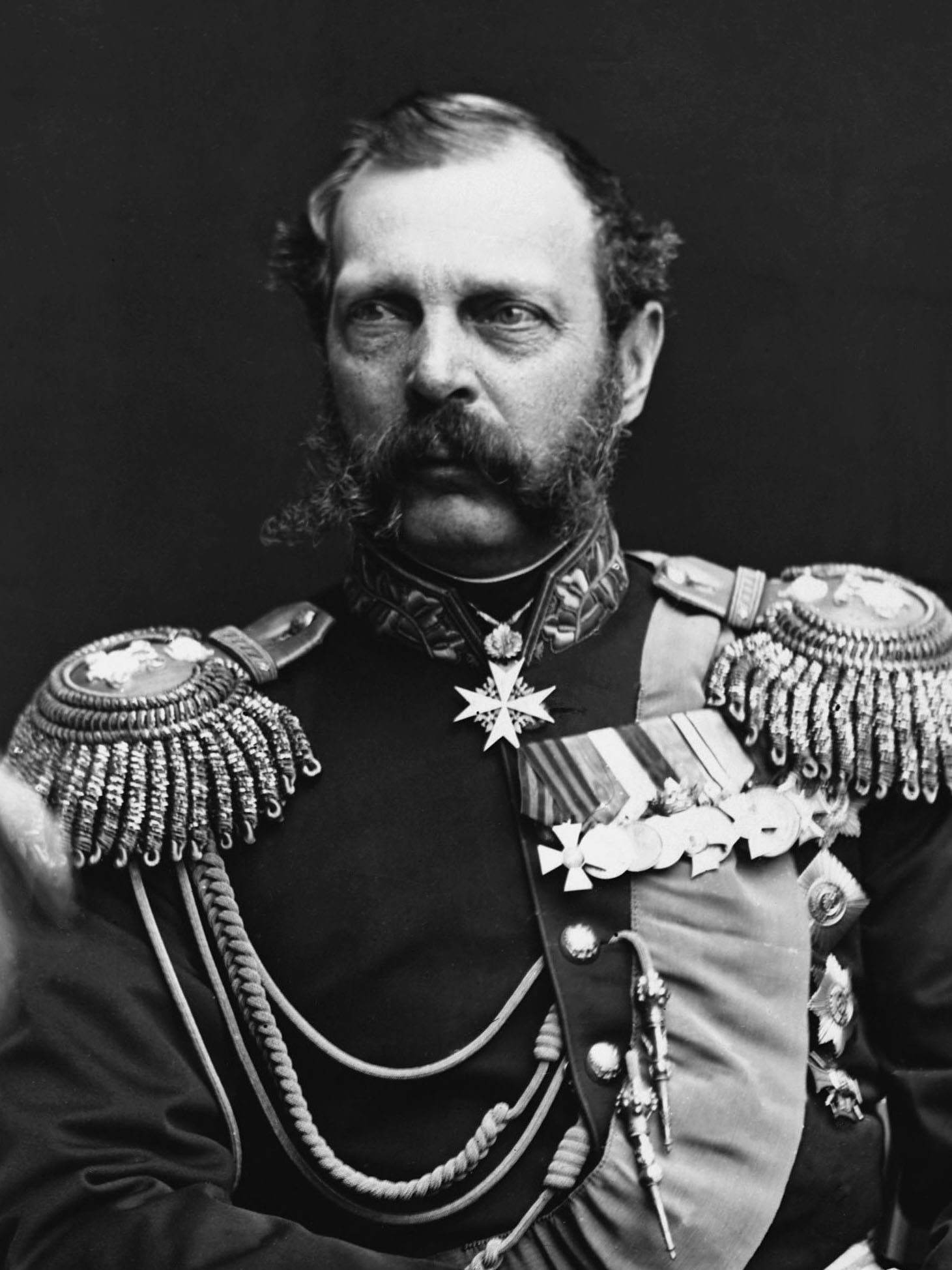
- Formal portrait, c. 1874

Emperor of Russia
- Reign: 2 March 1855 – 13 March 1881
- Coronation: 7 September 1856
- Predecessor: Nicholas I
- Successor: Alexander III
- Born: 29 April 1818; Kremlin, Moscow, Russia
- Died: 13 March 1881 (aged 62); Winter Palace, Saint Petersburg, Russia
- Cause of death: Assassination
- Burial: Saints Peter and Paul Cathedral, Saint Petersburg, Russia
- Spouses: Marie of Hesse and by Rhine (m. 1841; died 1880) Catherine Mikhailovna Dolgorukova (m. 1880) (Note: Morganatic marriage.)
- Issue among others...: List: Grand Duchess Alexandra; Nicholas Alexandrovich, Tsesarevich of Russia; Alexander III; Grand Duke Vladimir; Grand Duke Alexei; Maria, Duchess of Saxe-Coburg and Gotha; Grand Duke Sergei; Grand Duke Paul Legitimized: Prince George Yuryevsky; Princess Olga Yurievskaya; Prince Boris Alexandrovich Yurievsky; Princess Catherine Yurievskaya
Names
- Alexander Nikolayevich Romanov (Алекса́ндр Никола́евич Романов)
- House: Holstein-Gottorp-Romanov
- Father: Nicholas I of Russia
- Mother: Charlotte of Prussia

Alexander II (Note: Russian: Алекса́ндр II Никола́евич, romanized: Aleksándr II Nikoláyevich, IPA: [ɐlʲɪˈksandr ftɐˈroj nʲɪkɐˈlajɪvʲɪtɕ]) (29 April 1818 – 13 March 1881) (Note: Old Style dates: 17 April 1818 – 1 March 1881) was Emperor of Russia, King of Poland, and Grand Duke of Finland from 2 March 1855 until his assassination on 13 March 1881. He is also known as Alexander the Liberator (Note: Russian: Алекса́ндр Освободи́тель, romanized: Aleksándr Osvobodítel, IPA: [ɐlʲɪˈksandr ɐsvəbɐˈdʲitʲɪlʲ]) because of his historic Edict of Emancipation, which officially abolished Russian serfdom in 1861. Crowned on 7 September 1856, he succeeded his father Nicholas I and was succeeded by his son Alexander III.

In addition to emancipating serfs across the Russian Empire, Alexander's reign brought several other liberal reforms, such as improving the judicial system, relaxing media censorship, eliminating some legal restrictions on Jews, abolishing corporal punishment, promoting local self-government, strengthening the Imperial Russian Army and the Imperial Russian Navy, modernizing and expanding schools and universities, and diversifying the Russian economy. However, many of these reforms were met with intense backlash and cut back or reversed entirely, and Alexander eventually shifted towards a considerably more conservative political stance following an assassination attempt against him in 1866.

The foreign policy of Alexander was relatively pacifist, especially in comparison to his father's, although he did continue the Russian Empire's expansionist campaigns into the Far East, the Caucasus, and Central Asia. As a consequence of the Great Game and the Crimean War, Alexander was particularly opposed to and wary of the United Kingdom. He was also notably supportive of the United States; Alexander backed the Union during the American Civil War and even sent Russian warships to New York Harbor and San Francisco Bay to deter attacks by the Confederate Navy. In 1867, he sold Alaska to the United States, owing partly to his concern that it would be nearly impossible to prevent the Russian Empire's North American colonies, which bordered British Columbia and the North-Western Territory, from falling into British hands in the event of another war. Seeking peace and stability in the European continent, he moved away from bellicose France upon the fall of Napoleon III in 1870 and subsequently joined Germany and Austria-Hungary in the League of the Three Emperors in 1873.

Under Alexander's leadership, the Russian Empire engaged in the Russo-Turkish War of 1877–1878, resulting in the independence of Bulgaria, Montenegro, Romania, and Serbia from the Ottoman Empire. His expansionism on the Far Eastern front led to the Amur Annexation, and he also approved Russian military plans on the Caucasian front that culminated in the Circassian genocide. While he was disappointed by the results of the Congress of Berlin in 1878, he abided by that agreement. Among his greatest domestic challenges was a Polish uprising in January 1863, to which he responded by stripping Poland of its separate constitution and directly incorporating the kingdom into the Russian Empire. In the period preceding his assassination in 1881, Alexander had been proposing additional parliamentary reforms to counter the rise of nascent revolutionary and anarchistic movements in the region.

== Early life ==
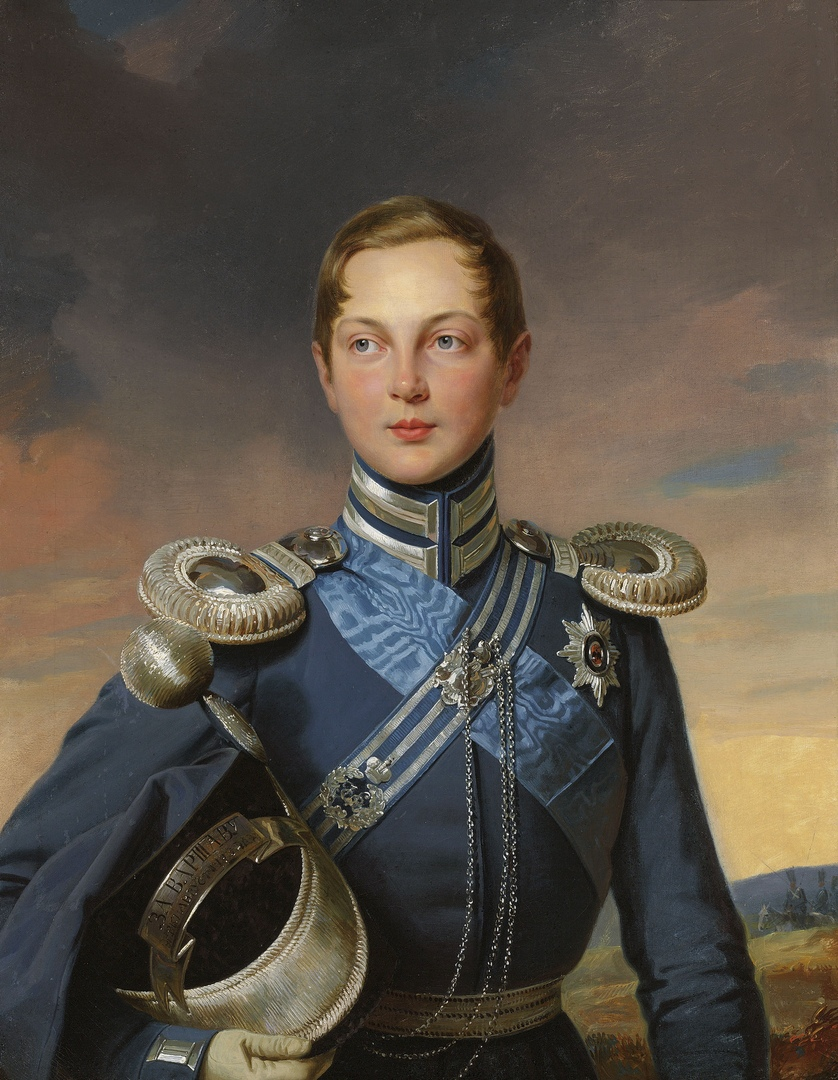
Grand Duke Alexander Nikolayevich, by Franz Krüger, 1830

Born in Moscow, Alexander Nikolayevich was the eldest son of Nicholas I of Russia and Charlotte of Prussia (eldest daughter of Frederick William III of Prussia and of Louise of Mecklenburg-Strelitz). His early life gave little indication of his ultimate potential; until the time of his accession in 1855, aged 37, few imagined that posterity would know him for implementing the most challenging reforms undertaken in Russia since the reign of Peter the Great.

His uncle Emperor Alexander I died childless. Grand Duke Konstantin, the next-younger brother of Alexander I, had previously renounced his rights to the throne of Russia. Thus, Alexander's father, who was the third son of Paul I, became the new Emperor; he took the name Nicholas I. At that time, Alexander became Tsesarevich as his father's heir to the throne.

In the period of his life as heir apparent (1825 to 1855), the intellectual atmosphere of Saint Petersburg did not favour any kind of change: freedom of thought and all forms of private initiative were suppressed vigorously by the order of his father. Personal and official censorship was rife; criticism of the authorities was regarded as a serious offence.

The education of the tsesarevich as future emperor took place under the supervision of the liberal romantic poet and gifted translator Vasily Zhukovsky, grasping a smattering of a great many subjects and becoming familiar with the chief modern European languages. Unusually for the time, the young Alexander was taken on a six-month tour of Russia (1837), visiting 20 provinces in the country. He also visited many prominent Western European countries in 1838 and 1839. As Tsesarevich, Alexander became the first Romanov heir to visit Siberia (1837). While touring Russia, he also befriended the then-exiled poet Alexander Herzen and pardoned him. It was through Herzen's influence that he later abolished serfdom in Russia.

In 1839, when his parents sent him on a tour of Europe, he met twenty-year-old Queen Victoria and they became acquainted. Simon Sebag Montefiore speculates that a small romance emerged. Such a marriage, however, would not work, as Alexander was not a minor prince of Europe and was in line to inherit a throne himself. In 1847, Alexander donated money to Ireland during the Great Famine.

He has been described as looking like a German, somewhat of a pacifist, a heavy smoker and card player. He spoke Russian and German.

== Reign ==
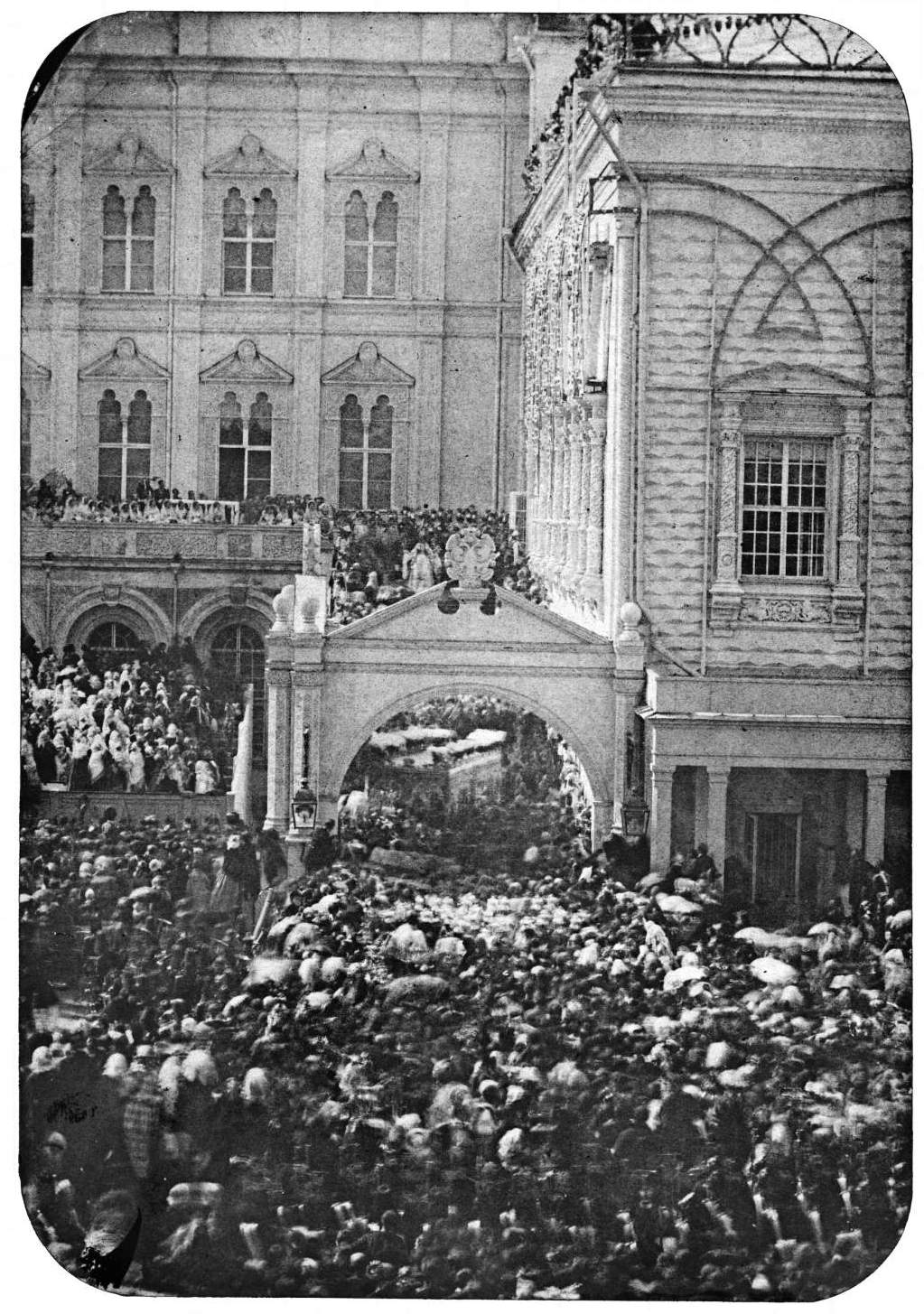
Procession of Alexander II into Dormition Cathedral from the Red Porch during his coronation

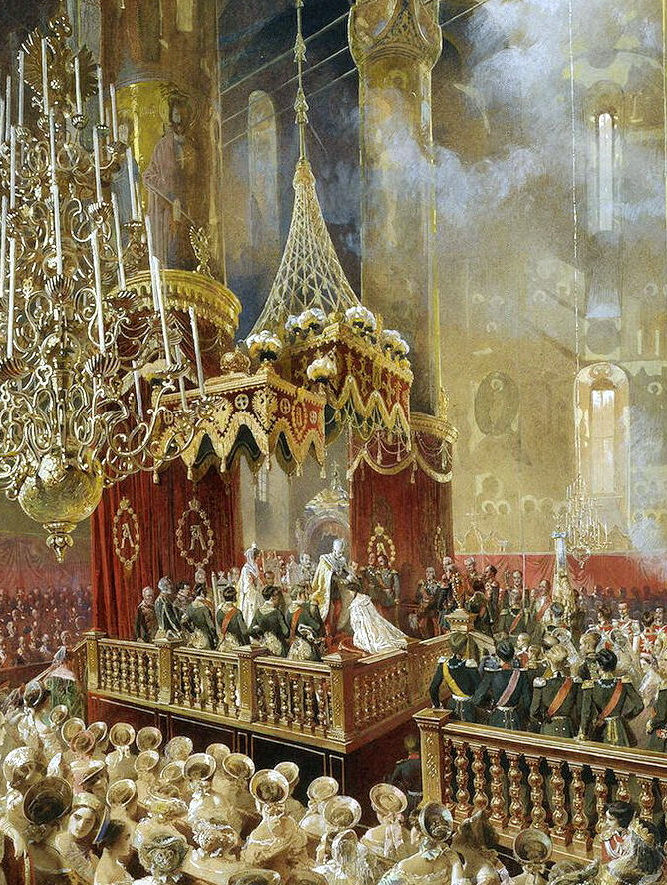
The coronation of Emperor Alexander II and Empress Maria Alexandrovna on 26 August/7 September 1856 at the Dormition Cathedral of the Moscow Kremlin, painting by Mihály Zichy. The painting depicts the moment when the Emperor crowned the Empress.

The death of his father gave Alexander a diplomatic headache, for his father was engaged in open warfare in the southwest of his empire. On 15 January 1856, the new tsar took Russia out of the Crimean War on the very unfavourable terms of the Treaty of Paris (1856), which included the loss of the Black Sea Fleet, and the provision that the Black Sea was to be a demilitarized zone similar to a contemporaneous region of the Baltic Sea. This gave him room to breathe and pursue an ambitious plan of domestic reforms.

=== Reforms ===
Encouraged by public opinion, Alexander began a period of radical reforms, including an attempt not to depend on landed aristocracy controlling the poor, an effort to develop Russia's natural resources, and to reform all branches of the administration.

Boris Chicherin (1828–1904) was a political philosopher who believed that Russia needed a strong, authoritative government by Alexander to make the reforms possible. He praised Alexander for the range of his fundamental reforms, arguing that the tsar was:

called upon to execute one of the hardest tasks which can confront an autocratic ruler: to completely remodel the enormous state which had been entrusted to his care, to abolish an age-old order founded on slavery, to replace it with civic decency and freedom, to establish justice in a country which had never known the meaning of legality, to redesign the entire administration, to introduce freedom of the press in the context of untrammeled authority, to call new forces to life at every turn and set them on firm legal foundations, to put a repressed and humiliated society on its feet, and to give it the chance to flex its muscles.

==== Emancipation of the serfs ====
Alexander II succeeded to the throne upon the death of his father in 1855. As Tsesarevich, he had been an enthusiastic supporter of his father's reactionary policies. That is, he always obeyed the autocratic ruler. But now he was the autocratic ruler himself, and fully intended to rule according to what he thought best. He rejected any moves to set up a parliamentary system that would curb his powers. He inherited a large mess that had been wrought by his father's fear of progress during his reign. Many of the other royal families of Europe had also disliked Nicholas I, which extended to distrust of the Romanov dynasty itself. Even so, there was no one more prepared to bring the country around than Alexander II. The first year of his reign was devoted to the prosecution of the Crimean War and, after the fall of Sevastopol, to negotiations for peace led by his trusted counsellor, Prince Alexander Gorchakov. The country had been exhausted and humiliated by the war. Bribe-taking, theft and corruption were rampant.

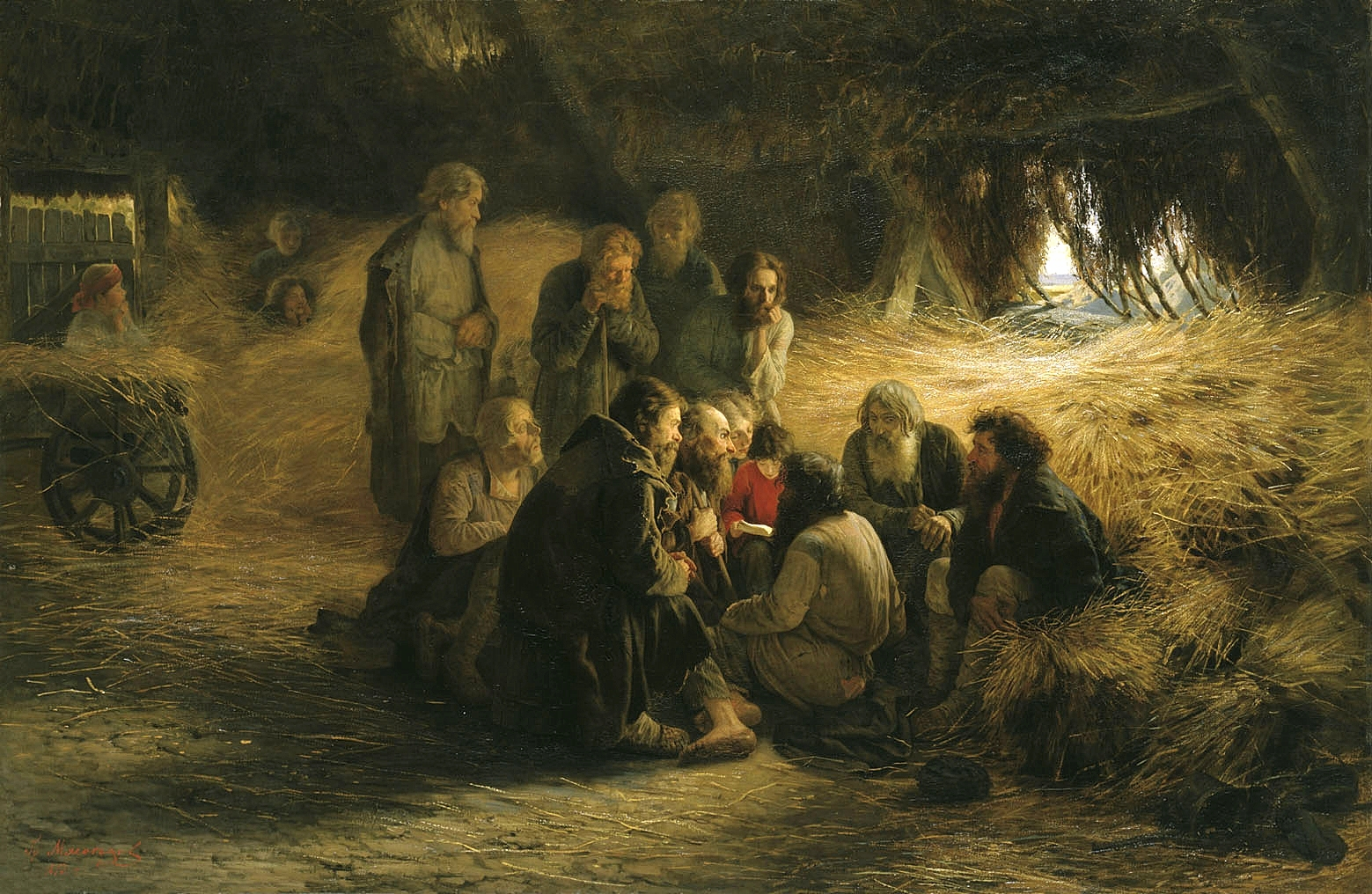
Russian peasants reading the Emancipation Manifesto, an 1873 painting by Grigory Myasoyedov

The Emancipation Reform of 1861 abolished serfdom on private estates throughout the Russian Empire. By this edict more than 23 million people received their liberty. Serfs gained the full rights of free citizens, including rights to marry without having to gain consent, to own property, and to own a business. The measure was the first and most important of the liberal reforms made by Alexander II.

Polish landed proprietors of the Lithuanian provinces presented a petition hoping that their relations with the serfs might be regulated in a way more satisfactory for the proprietors. Alexander II authorized the formation of committees "for ameliorating the condition of the peasants", and laid down the principles on which the amelioration was to be effected. Without consulting his ordinary advisers, Alexander ordered the Minister of the Interior to send a circular to the provincial governors of European Russia (serfdom was rare in other parts) containing a copy of the instructions forwarded to the Governor-General of Lithuania, praising the supposed generous, patriotic intentions of the Lithuanian landed proprietors, and suggesting that perhaps the landed proprietors of other provinces might express a similar desire. The hint was taken: in all provinces where serfdom existed, emancipation committees were formed.

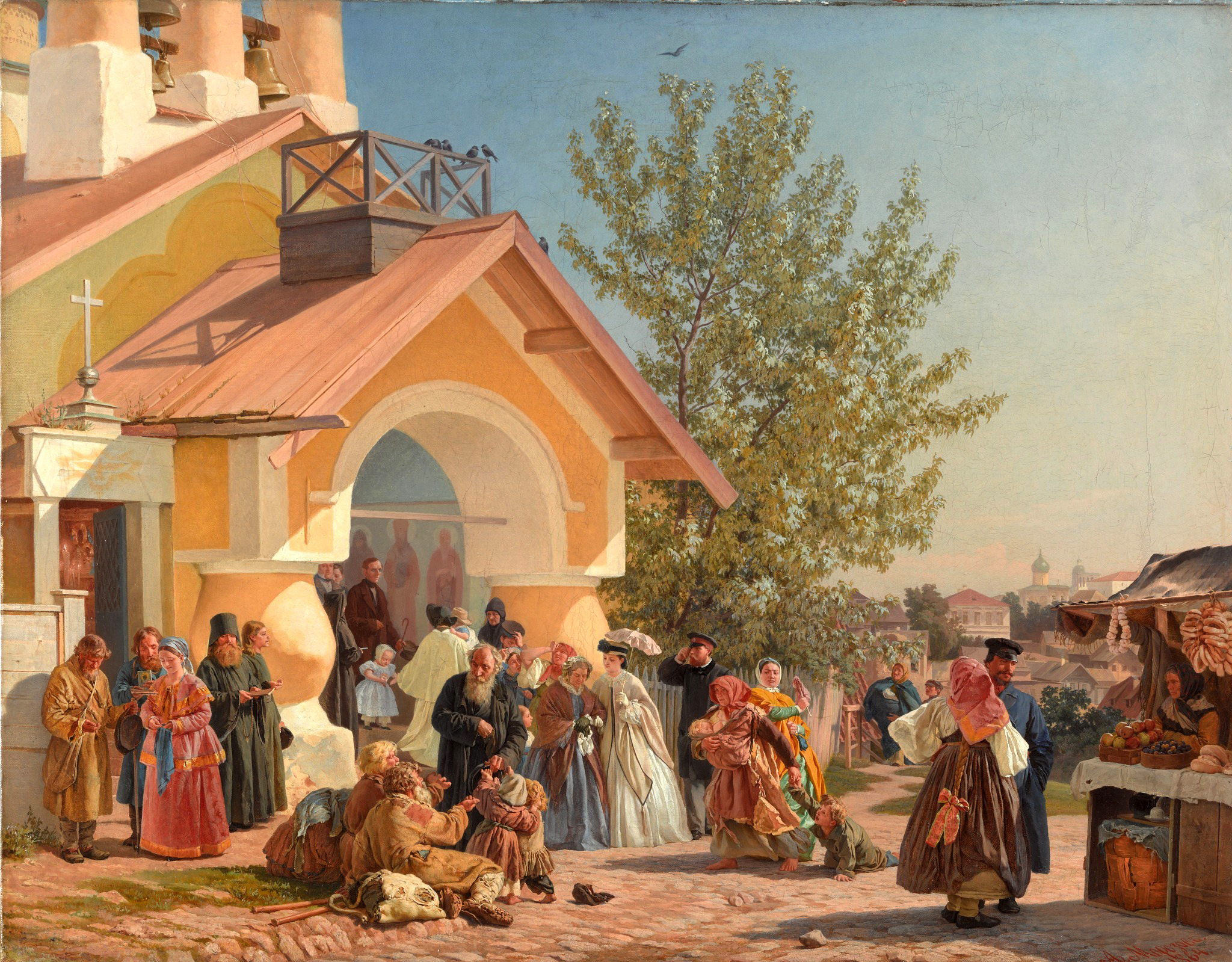
Leaving church in Pskov, 1864

Emancipation was not a simple goal capable of being achieved instantaneously by imperial decree. It contained complicated problems, deeply affecting the economic, social, and political future of the nation. Alexander had to choose between the different measures recommended to him and decide, if the serfs would become agricultural laborers dependent economically and administratively on the landlords, or if the serfs would be transformed into a class of independent communal proprietors. The emperor gave his support to the latter project, and the Russian peasantry became one of the last groups of peasants in Europe to shake off serfdom. The architects of the emancipation manifesto were Alexander's brother Konstantin, Yakov Rostovtsev, and Nikolay Milyutin. On 3 March 1861, six years after his accession, the emancipation law was signed and published.

==== Additional reforms ====
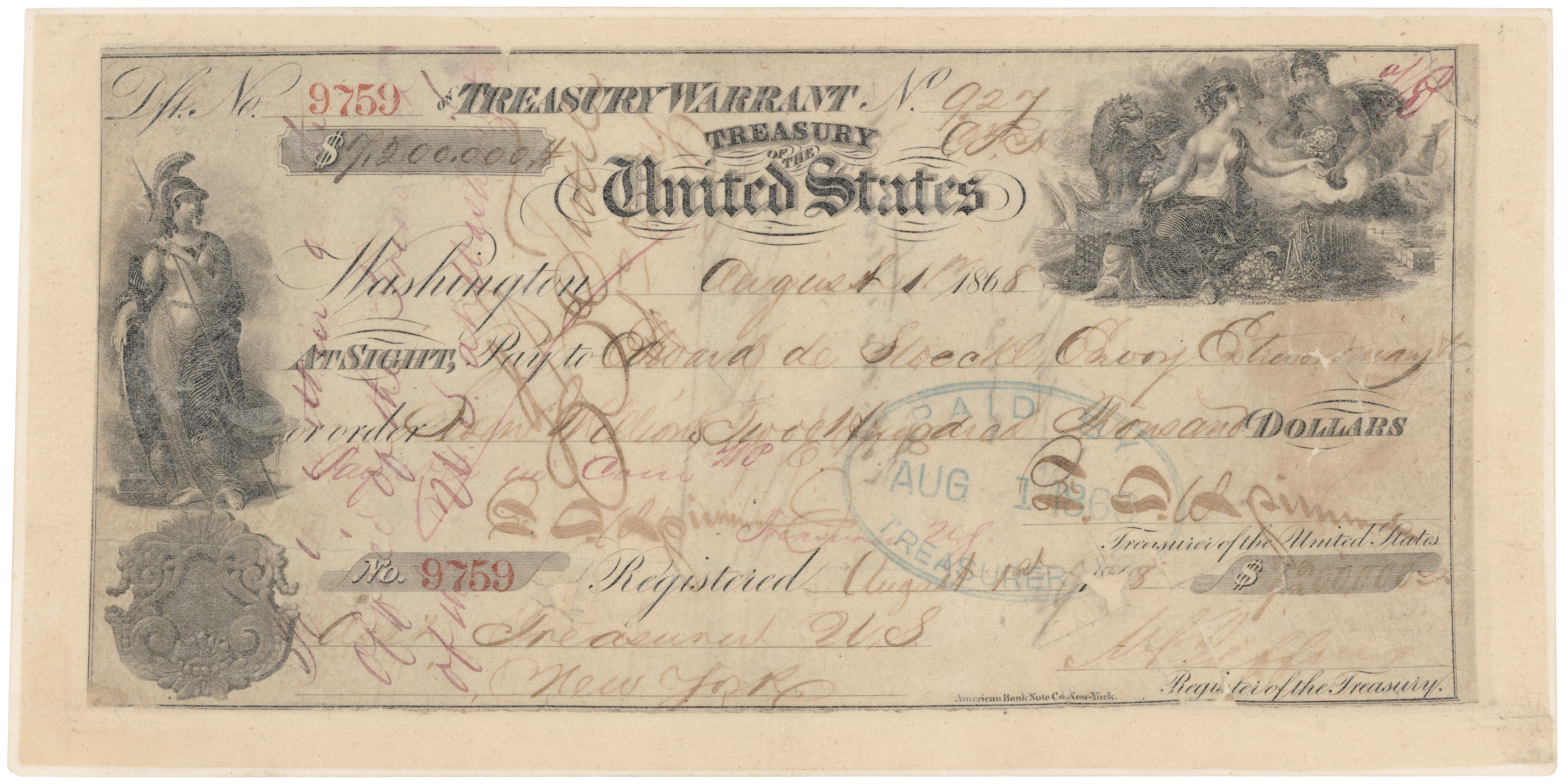
The US$7.2 million check used to pay for Russian Alaska in 1867

A host of new reforms followed in diverse areas. The tsar appointed Dmitry Milyutin to carry out significant reforms in the Russian armed forces. Further important changes were made concerning industry and commerce, and the new freedom thus afforded produced a large number of limited liability companies. Plans were formed for building a great network of railways, partly to develop the natural resources of the country, and partly to increase its power for defense and attack.

Military reforms included universal conscription, introduced for all social classes on 1 January 1874. Prior to the new regulation, as of 1861, conscription was compulsorily enforced only for the peasantry. Conscription had been 25 years for serfs who were drafted by their landowners, which was widely considered to be a life sentence. Other military reforms included extending the reserve forces and the military district system, which split the Russian states into 15 military districts, a system still in use over a hundred years later. The building of strategic railways and an emphasis on the military education of the officer corps comprised further reforms. Corporal punishment in the military and branding of soldiers as punishment were banned. The bulk of important military reforms were enacted as a result of the poor showing in the Crimean War.

A new judicial administration (1864), based on the French model, introduced security of tenure. A new penal code and a greatly simplified system of civil and criminal procedure also came into operation. Reorganisation of the judiciary occurred to include trial in open court, with judges appointed for life, a jury system, and the creation of justices of the peace to deal with minor offences at local level. Legal historian Sir Henry Maine credited Alexander II with the first great attempt since the time of Grotius to codify and humanise the usages of war.

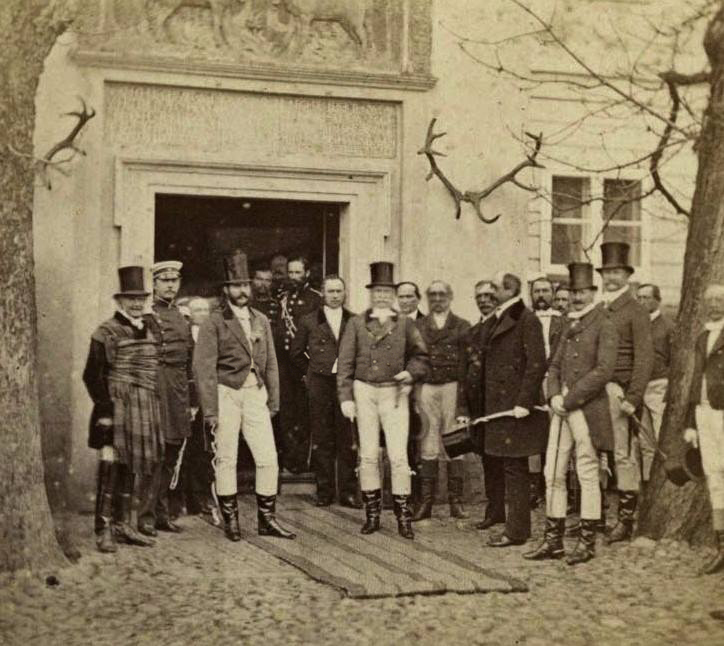
Alexander II with his uncle, German Emperor William I, on a hunting trip together, 1872

Alexander's bureaucracy instituted an elaborate scheme of local self-government (zemstvo) for the rural districts (1864) and the large towns (1870), with elective assemblies possessing a restricted right of taxation, and a new rural and municipal police under the direction of the Minister of the Interior.

Under Alexander's rules Jews could not own land, and were restricted in travel. However special taxes on Jews were eliminated and those who graduated from secondary school were permitted to live outside the Pale of Settlement, and became eligible for state employment. Large numbers of educated Jews moved as soon as possible to Moscow, Saint Petersburg, and other major cities.

The Alaska colony was losing money, and would be impossible to defend in wartime against Britain, so in 1867 Russia sold Alaska to the United States for $7.2 million (equivalent to $166 million in 2025). The Russian administrators, soldiers, settlers, and some of the priests returned home. Others stayed to minister to their native parishioners, who remain members of the Russian Orthodox Church into the 21st century.

=== Reaction after 1866 ===
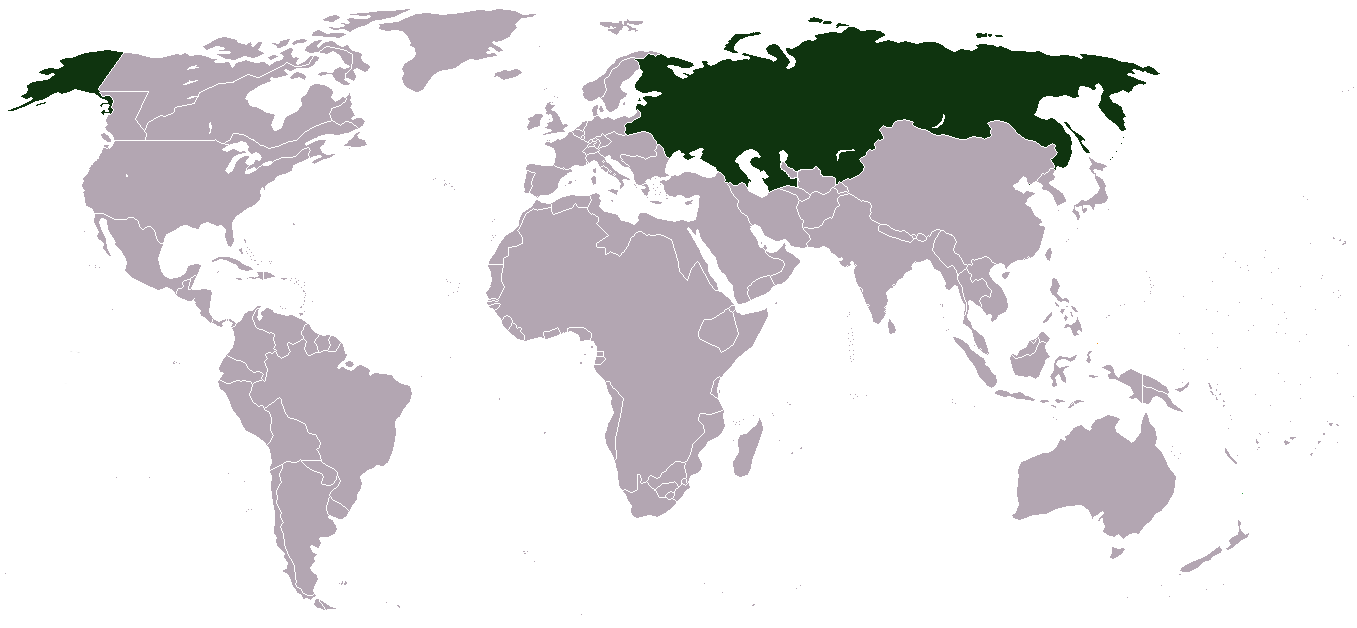
Map of the Russian Empire at its height in 1866

Alexander maintained a generally liberal course. Radicals complained he did not go far enough, and he became a target for numerous assassination plots. He survived attempts that took place in 1866, 1879, and 1880. Finally 13 March [O.S. 1 March] 1881, assassins organized by the Narodnaya Volya (People's Will) party killed him with a bomb. The Emperor had earlier in the day signed the Loris-Melikov constitution, which would have created two legislative commissions made up of indirectly elected representatives, had it not been repealed by his reactionary successor Alexander III.

An attempted assassination in 1866 started a more conservative period that lasted until his death. The Tsar made a series of new appointments, replacing liberal ministers with conservatives. Under Minister of Education Dmitry Tolstoy, liberal university courses and subjects that encouraged critical thinking were replaced by a more traditional curriculum, and from 1871 onwards only students from gymnasiums could progress to university. In 1879, governors-general were established with powers to prosecute in military courts and exile political offenders. The government also held show trials with the intention of deterring others from revolutionary activity, but after cases such as the Trial of the 193 where sympathetic juries acquitted many of the defendants, this was abandoned.

=== Suppression of separatist movements ===
Battle of Mrzygłód during the January Uprising in 1863

After Alexander II became Emperor of Russia and King of Poland in 1855, he substantially relaxed the strict and repressive regime that had been imposed on Congress Poland after the November Uprising of 1830–1831.

However, in 1856, at the beginning of his reign, Alexander made a memorable speech to the deputies of the Polish nobility who inhabited Congress Poland, Western Ukraine, Lithuania, Livonia, and Belarus, in which he warned against further concessions with the words, "Gentlemen, let us have no dreams!" This served as a warning to the Polish-Lithuanian Commonwealth. The territories of the former Poland-Lithuania were excluded from liberal policies introduced by Alexander. The result was the January Uprising of 1863–1864 that was suppressed after eighteen months of fighting. Hundreds of Poles were executed, and thousands were deported to Siberia. The price of suppression was Russian support for the unification of Germany.

The martial law in Lithuania, introduced in 1863, lasted for the next 40 years. Native languages, Ukrainian, and Belarusian, were completely banned from printed texts, the Ems Ukase being an example. The authorities banned use of the Latin script for writing Lithuanian. The Polish language was banned in both oral and written form from all provinces except Congress Poland, where it was allowed in private conversations only.

Nikolay Milyutin was installed as governor and he decided that the best response to the January Uprising was to make reforms regarding the peasants. He devised a program which involved the emancipation of the peasantry at the expense of the nationalist szlachta landowners and the expulsion of Roman Catholic priests from schools. Emancipation of the Polish peasantry from their serf-like status took place in 1864, on more generous terms than the emancipation of Russian peasants in 1861.

=== Encouraging Finnish nationalism ===
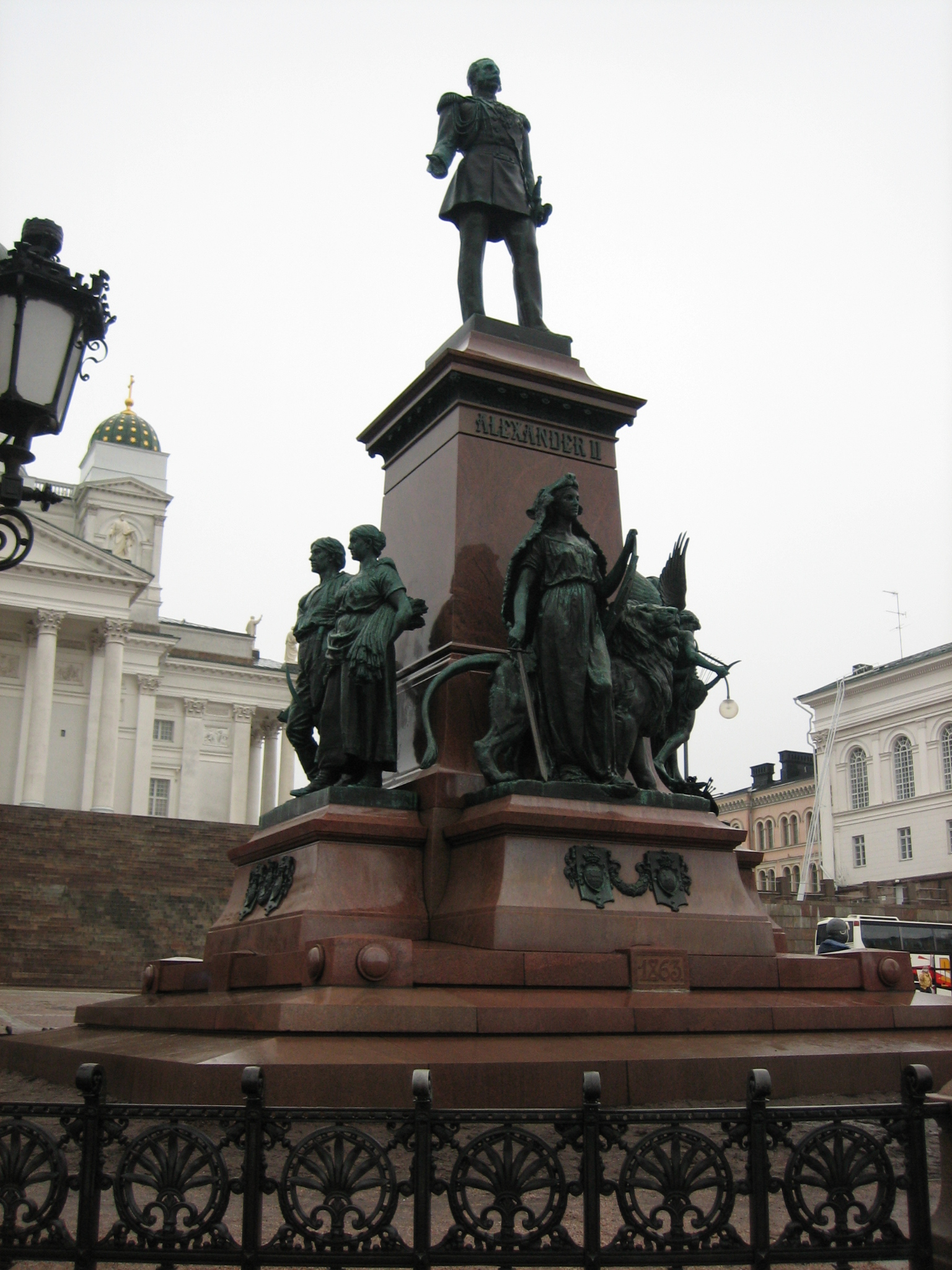
Monument to Alexander II "The Liberator" at the Senate Square in Helsinki, by sculptor Walter Runeberg. It was erected in 1894, when Finland was still a Russian grand duchy.

In 1863, Alexander II re-convened the Diet of Finland and initiated several increasing Finland's autonomy within the Russian Empire, including establishment of its own currency, the Finnish markka. Liberation of business led to increased foreign investment and industrial development. Finland also got its first railways, separately established under Finnish administration. Finally, the elevation of Finnish from a language of the common people to a national language equal to Swedish opened opportunities for a larger proportion of Finnish society. Alexander II is still regarded as "The Good Tsar" in Finland.

These reforms could be seen as results of a genuine belief that reforms were easier to test in an underpopulated, homogeneous country than in the whole of Russia. They may also be seen as a reward for the loyalty of its relatively western-oriented population during the Crimean War and during the Polish uprising. Encouraging Finnish nationalism and language can also be seen as an attempt to dilute ties with Sweden.

=== Foreign affairs ===
During the Crimean War Austria maintained a policy of hostile neutrality towards Russia, and, while not going to war, was supportive of the Anglo-French coalition. Having abandoned its alliance with Russia, Austria was diplomatically isolated following the war, which contributed to Russia's non-intervention in the 1859 Franco-Austrian War, which meant the end of Austrian influence in Italy; and in the 1866 Austro-Prussian War, with the loss of its influence in most German-speaking lands.

During the American Civil War (1861–1865), Russia supported the Union, largely due to the view that the U.S. served as a counterbalance to their geopolitical rival, Great Britain. In 1863, the Russian Navy's Baltic and Pacific fleets wintered in the American ports of New York and San Francisco, respectively.

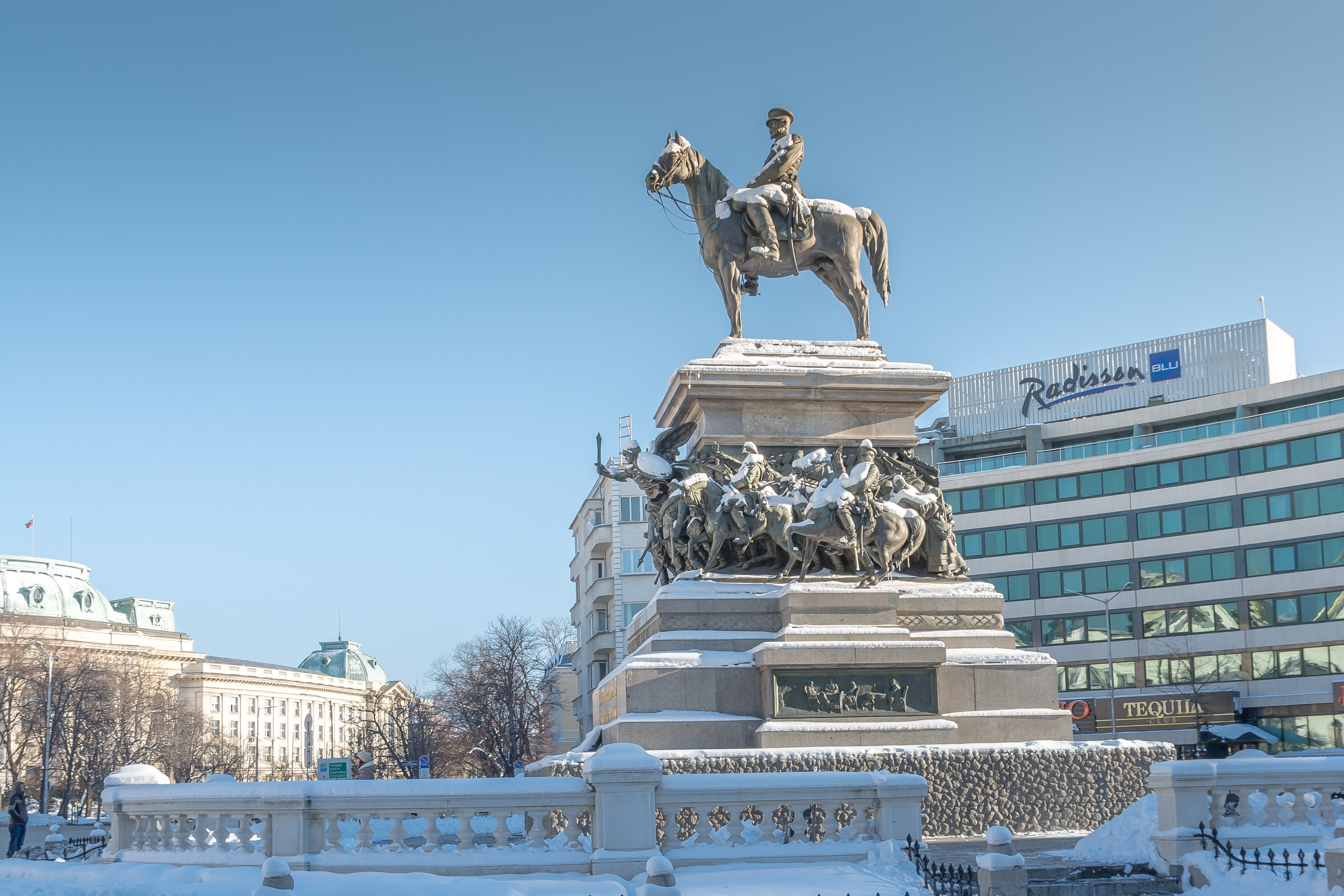
The Monument to the Tsar Liberator in the centre of Sofia, the capital of Bulgaria

The Treaty of Paris of 1856 stood until 1871, when Prussia defeated France in the Franco-Prussian War. During his reign, Napoleon III, eager for the support of the United Kingdom, had opposed Russia over the Eastern Question. France abandoned its opposition to Russia after the establishment of the French Third Republic. Encouraged by the new attitude of French diplomacy and supported by the German Chancellor Otto von Bismarck, Russia renounced the Black Sea clauses of the Paris treaty agreed to in 1856. As the United Kingdom with Austria could not enforce the clauses, Russia once again established a fleet in the Black Sea. France, after the Franco-Prussian War and the loss of Alsace–Lorraine, was fervently hostile to Germany and maintained friendly relations with Russia.

In the Russo-Turkish War (1877–1878) the states of Romania, Serbia, and Montenegro gained international recognition of their independence while Bulgaria and Eastern Rumelia achieved their autonomy from direct Ottoman rule. Russia took over Southern Bessarabia, lost in 1856.

the matter of complete conquest of the Caucasus is near to conclusion. A few years of persistent efforts remain to utterly force out the hostile mountaineers from the fertile countries they occupy and settle on the latter a Russian Christian population forever.

— Imperial rescript of Alexander II ordering the ethnic cleansing of the Muslim Circassians and advancement of Russian settler-colonial program in Caucasus. (Dated 24 June 1861)

==== End of the Caucasian War ====
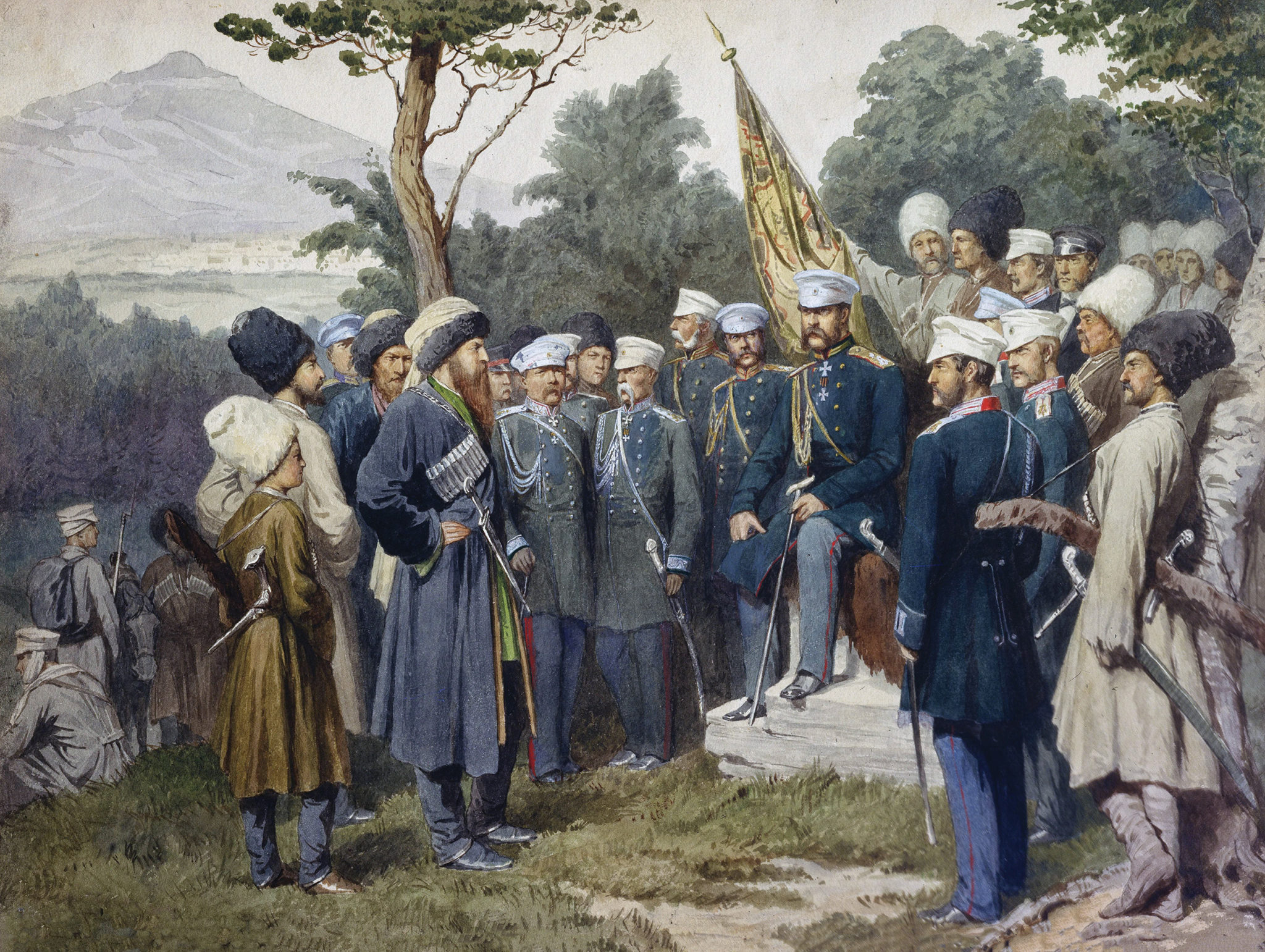
Imam Shamil surrendered to Count Baryatinsky on 25 August 1859.

The Russo-Circassian War (1763–1864) concluded as a Russian victory during Alexander II's rule. Just before the conclusion of the war the Russian Army, under the emperor's order, implemented the mass-killings and extermination of Circassian "mountaineers" in the Circassian genocide, which would be often referred to as "cleansing" and "genocide" in several historic dialogues.

In 1857, Dmitry Milyutin first published the idea of mass expulsions of Circassian natives. Milyutin argued that the goal was not to simply move them so that their land could be settled by productive farmers, but rather that "eliminating the Circassians was to be an end in itself – to cleanse the land of hostile elements". Tsar Alexander II endorsed the plans. A large portion of indigenous Muslim peoples of the region were ethnically cleansed from their homeland at the end of the Russo-Circassian War by Russia. A large deportation operation was launched against the remaining population before the end of the war in 1864 and it was mostly completed by 1867. Only a small percentage accepted surrender and resettlement within the Russian Empire. The remaining Circassian populations who refused to surrender were thus variously dispersed, resettled, or killed en masse.

==== Liberation of Bulgaria ====
In April 1876, the Bulgarian population in the Balkans rebelled against Ottoman rule. The Ottoman authorities suppressed the April Uprising, causing a general outcry throughout Europe. Some of the most prominent intellectuals and politicians on the Continent, most notably Victor Hugo and William Gladstone, sought to raise awareness about the atrocities that the Turks imposed on the Bulgarian population. To solve this new crisis in the "Eastern question" a Constantinople Conference was convened by the Great Powers in Constantinople at the end of the year. The participants in the Conference failed to reach a final agreement.

After the failure of the Constantinople Conference, at the beginning of 1877, Emperor Alexander II started diplomatic preparations with the other Great Powers to secure their neutrality in case of a war between Russia and the Ottomans. Alexander II considered such agreements paramount in avoiding the possibility of causing his country a disaster similar to the Crimean War.

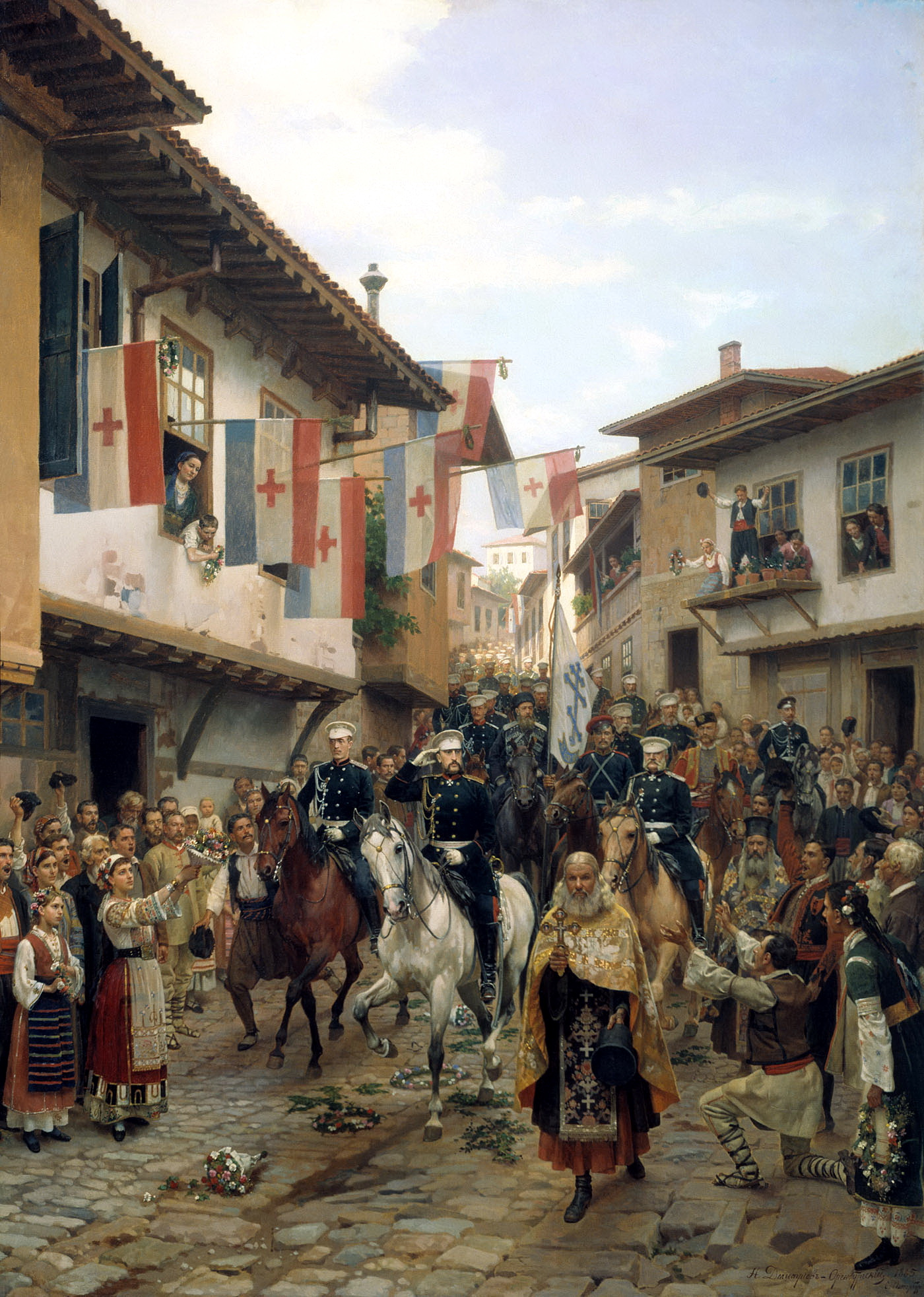
In 1877, Russian general Iosif Gurko liberated Veliko Tarnovo, ending the 480-year rule of the Ottoman Empire.

The Russian Emperor succeeded in his diplomatic endeavors. Having secured agreement as to non-involvement by the other Great Powers, on 17 April 1877 Russia declared war upon the Ottoman Empire. The Russians, helped by the Romanian Army under its supreme commander King Carol I (then Prince of Romania), who sought to obtain Romanian independence from the Ottomans as well, were successful against the Turks and the Russo-Turkish War of 1877–1878 ended with the signing of the preliminary peace Treaty of San Stefano on 19 February [O.S. 3 March] 1878. The treaty and the subsequent Congress of Berlin (June–July 1878) secured the emergence of an independent Bulgarian state for the first time since 1396, and Bulgarian parliamentarians elected the tsar's nephew, Prince Alexander of Battenberg, as the Bulgarians' first ruler.

For his social reforms in Russia and his role in the liberation of Bulgaria, Alexander II became known in Bulgaria as the "Tsar-Liberator of Russians and Bulgarians". A monument to Alexander II was erected in 1907 in Sofia in the "National Assembly" square, opposite to the Parliament building. The monument underwent a complete reconstruction in 2012, funded by the Sofia Municipality and some Russian foundations. The inscription on the monument reads in Old-Bulgarian style: "To the Tsar-Liberator from grateful Bulgaria". There is a museum dedicated to Alexander in the Bulgarian city of Pleven.

=== Assassination attempts ===
In April 1866, there was an attempt on the emperor's life in St. Petersburg by Dmitry Karakozov. To commemorate his narrow escape from death (which he himself referred to only as "the event of 4 April 1866"), a number of churches and chapels were built in many Russian cities. Viktor Hartmann, a Russian architect, even sketched a design of a monumental gate (which was never built) to commemorate the event. Modest Mussorgsky later wrote his piano suite Pictures at an Exhibition, the last movement of which, "The Great Gate of Kiev", is based on Hartmann's sketches. The Tsarist government also responded to the assassination attempt by banning Charles Darwin's On the Origin of Species and other scientific publications they considered "subversive", believing there was a close association between Darwinism and revolutionary politics.

During the 1867 World's Fair in Paris, Polish immigrant Antoni Berezowski attacked the carriage containing Alexander, his two sons and Napoleon III. His self-modified double-barreled pistol misfired and struck the horse of an escorting cavalryman.

On the morning of 20 April 1879, Alexander was briskly walking towards the Square of the Guards Staff and faced Alexander Soloviev, a 33-year-old former student. Having seen a menacing revolver in his hands, the Emperor fled in a zigzag pattern. Soloviev fired five times but missed; he was sentenced to death and hanged on 28 May.

The student acted on his own, but other revolutionaries were keen to murder Alexander. In December 1879, the Narodnaya Volya (People's Will), a radical revolutionary group which hoped to ignite a social revolution, organised an explosion on the railway from Livadia to Moscow, but they missed the emperor's train.

On the evening of 5 February 1880, Stephan Khalturin, also from Narodnaya Volya, set off a timed charge under the dining room of the Winter Palace, right in the resting room of the guards a story below, killing 11 people and wounding 30 others. The New York Times (4 March 1880) reported "the dynamite used was enclosed in an iron box, and exploded by a system of clockwork used by the man Thomas in Bremen some years ago." However, dinner had been delayed by the late arrival of the tsar's nephew, the Prince of Bulgaria, so the tsar and his family were not in the dining room at the time of the explosion and were unharmed.

== Assassination ==
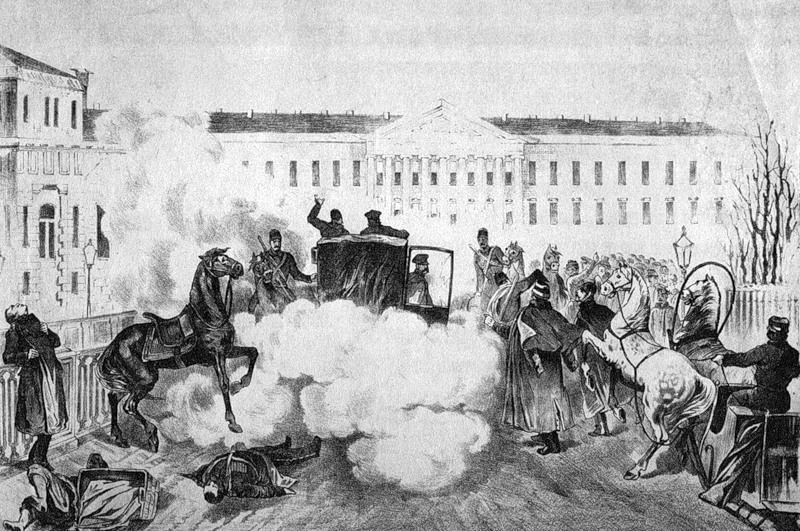
The explosion killed one of the Cossacks and wounded the driver.

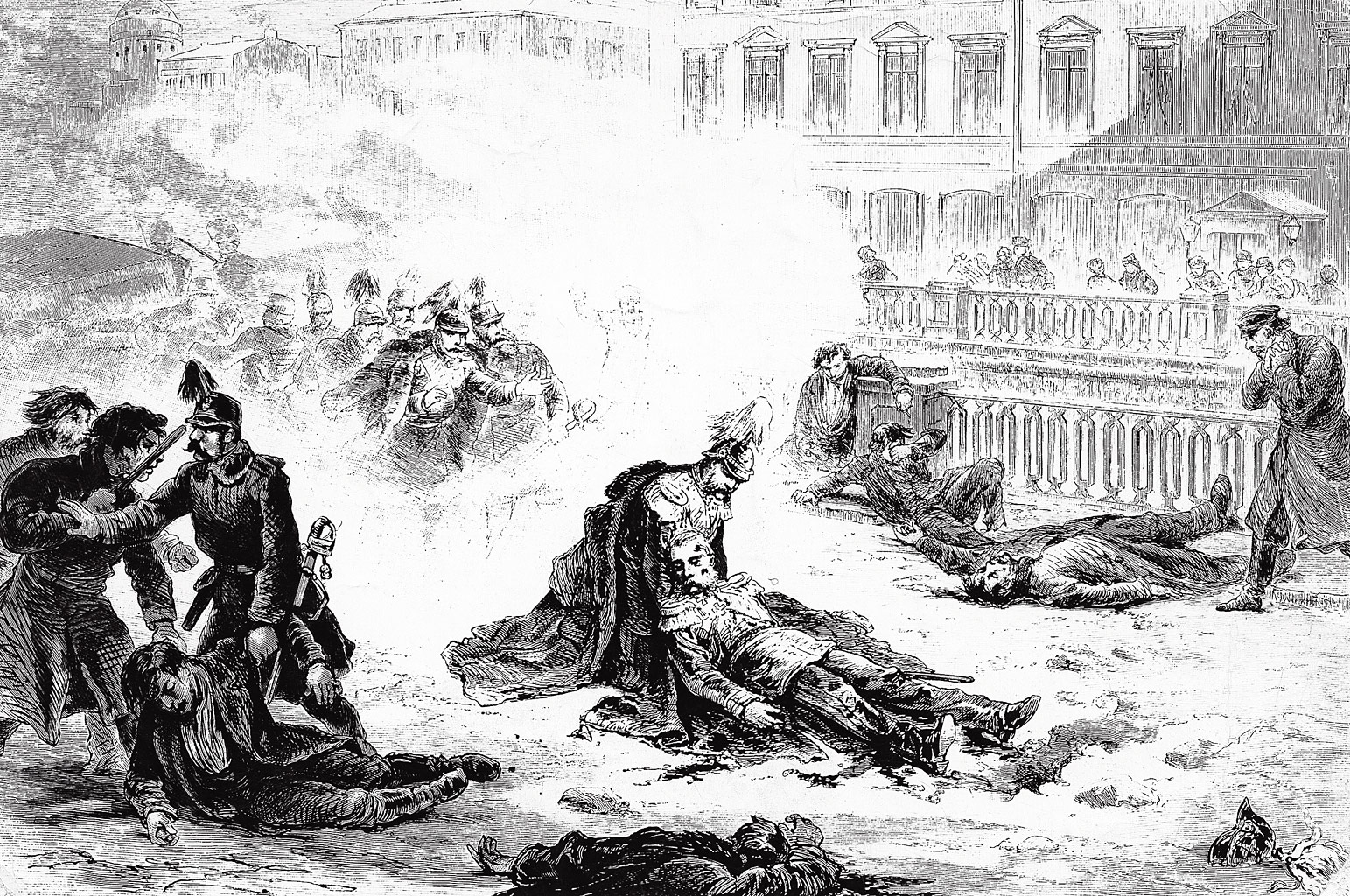
The assassination of Alexander II, drawing by G. Broling, 1881

After the last assassination attempt in February 1880, Count Loris-Melikov was appointed the head of the Supreme Executive Commission and given extraordinary powers to fight the revolutionaries. Loris-Melikov's proposals called for some form of parliamentary body, and the Emperor seemed to agree; these plans were never realized.

On 13 March [O.S. 1 March] 1881, Alexander was assassinated in Saint Petersburg.

As he was known to do every Sunday for many years, the emperor went to the Mikhailovsky Manège for the military roll call. He travelled both to and from the Manège in a closed carriage accompanied by five Cossacks and Frank (Franciszek) Joseph Jackowski, a Polish noble, with a sixth Cossack sitting on the coachman's left. The emperor's carriage was followed by two sleighs carrying, among others, the chief of police and the chief of the emperor's guards. The route, as always, was via the Catherine Canal and over the Pevchesky Bridge.

The street was flanked by narrow pavements for the public. A young member of the Narodnaya Volya ("People's Will") movement, Nikolai Rysakov, was carrying a small white package wrapped in a handkerchief. He later said of his attempt to kill the Tsar:

After a moment's hesitation I threw the bomb. I sent it under the horses' hooves in the supposition that it would blow up under the carriage... The explosion knocked me into the fence.

The explosion, while killing one of the Cossacks and seriously wounding the driver and people on the sidewalk, had only damaged the bulletproof carriage, a gift from Napoleon III of France. The emperor emerged shaken but unhurt. Rysakov was captured almost immediately. Police Chief Dvorzhitzky heard Rysakov shout out to someone else in the gathering crowd. Dvorzhitzky offered to drive the Tsar back to the Palace in his sleigh. The Tsar agreed, but he decided to first see the culprit, and to survey the damage. He expressed solicitude for the victims. To the anxious inquires of his entourage, Alexander replied, "Thank God, I'm untouched".

Nevertheless, a second young member of the Narodnaya Volya, Ignacy Hryniewiecki, standing by the canal fence, raised both arms and threw something at the emperor's feet. He was alleged to have shouted, "It is too early to thank God". Dvorzhitzky was later to write:

I was deafened by the new explosion, burned, wounded and thrown to the ground. Suddenly, amid the smoke and snowy fog, I heard His Majesty's weak voice cry, 'Help!' Gathering what strength I had, I jumped up and rushed to the emperor. His Majesty was half-lying, half-sitting, leaning on his right arm. Thinking he was merely wounded heavily, I tried to lift him but the czar's legs were shattered, and the blood poured out of them. Twenty people, with wounds of varying degree, lay on the sidewalk and on the street. Some managed to stand, others to crawl, still others tried to get out from beneath bodies that had fallen on them. Through the snow, debris, and blood you could see fragments of clothing, epaulets, sabres, and bloody chunks of human flesh.

Later, it was learnt there was a third bomber in the crowd. Ivan Emelyanov stood ready, clutching a briefcase containing a bomb that was to be used if the other two bombers failed.

Alexander was carried by sleigh to the Winter Palace to his study where almost the same day twenty years earlier, he had signed the Emancipation Edict freeing the serfs. Alexander was bleeding to death, with broken legs, bleeding knees, his stomach ripped open, and his face mutilated. Members of the Romanov family came rushing to the scene.

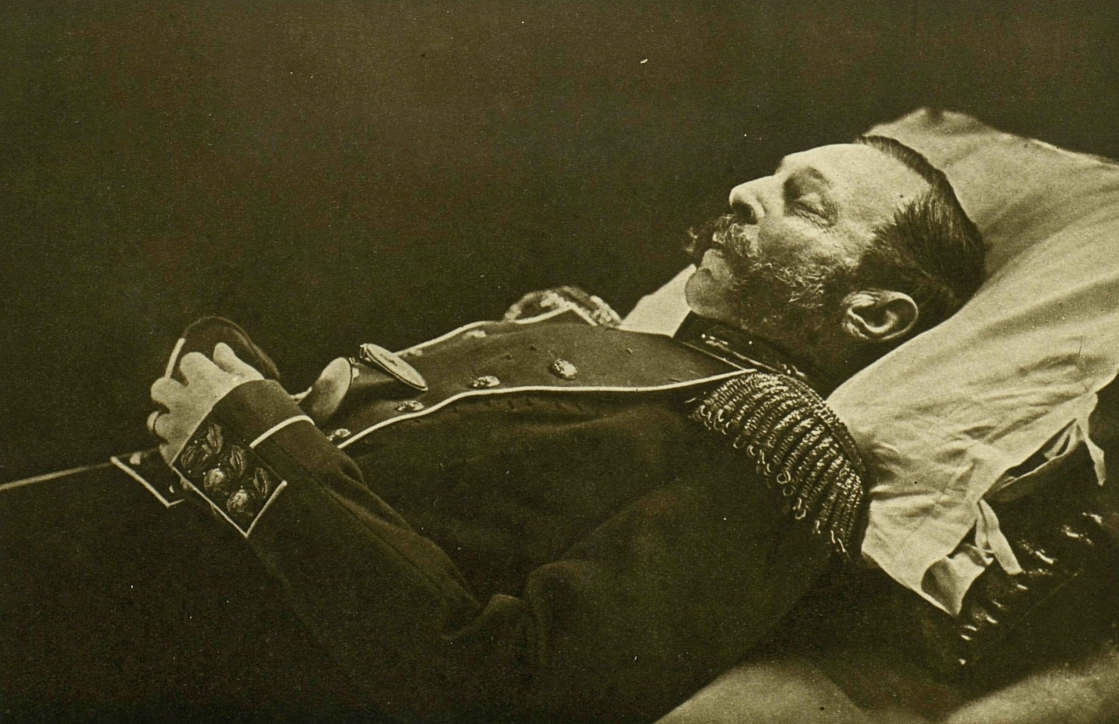
Alexander II on his deathbed

The dying emperor was given Communion and Last Rites. When the attending physician, Sergey Botkin, was asked how long it would be, he replied, "Up to fifteen minutes." At 3:30 that day, the standard of Alexander II (his personal flag) was lowered for the last time.

== Aftermath ==
The Church of the Savior on Blood was built on the site of Alexander II's assassination.

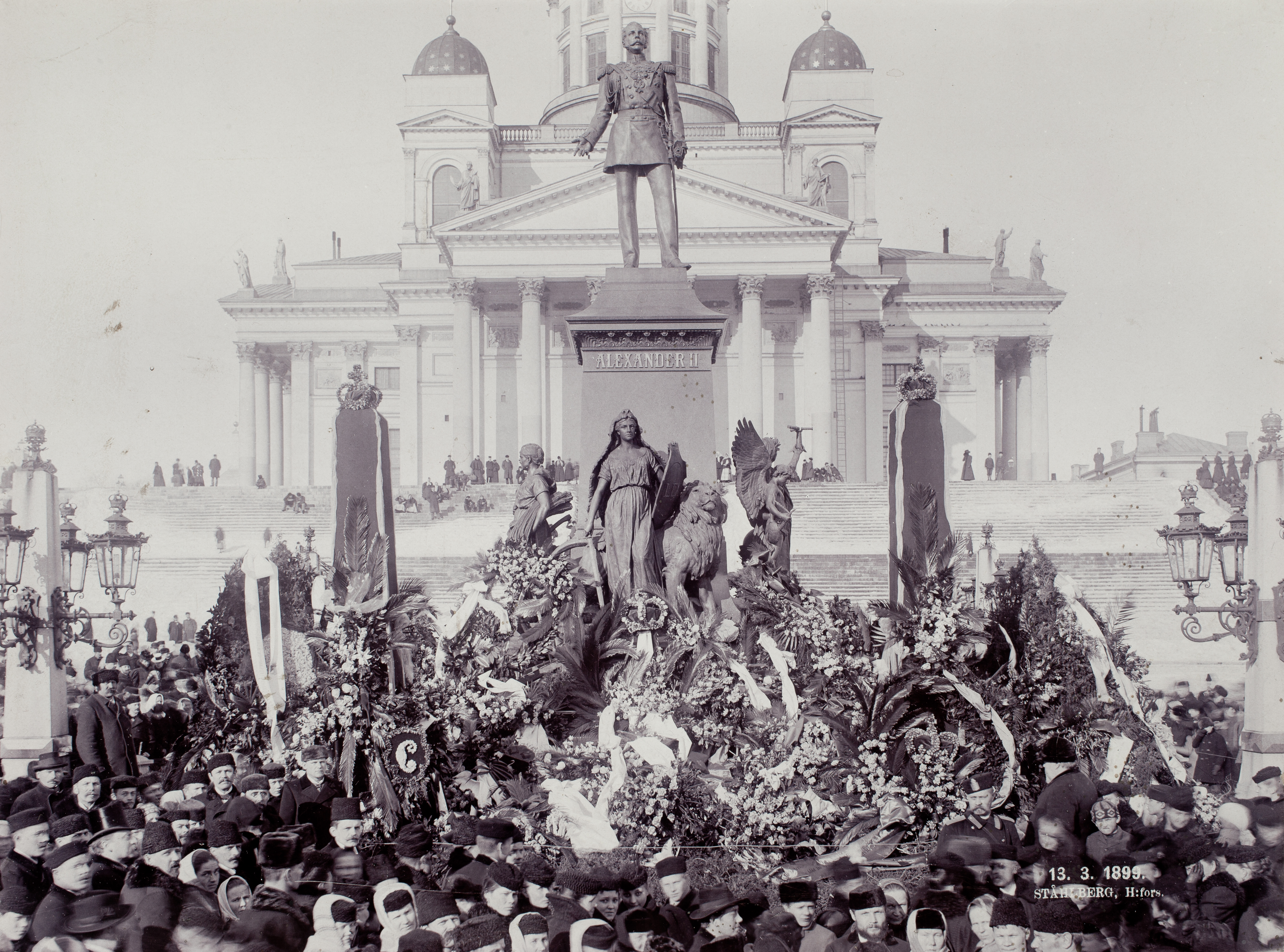
Alexander II, also known as the Grand Duke of Finland, was well regarded among the majority of Finns. Statue of Alexander II at the Senate Square in Helsinki, Finland, flowered on 13 March 1899, the day of the commemoration of the emperor's death.

Alexander II's death caused a great setback for the reform movement. One of his last acts was the approval of Mikhail Loris-Melikov's constitutional reforms. Though the reforms were conservative in practice, their significance lay in the value Alexander II attributed to them: "I have given my approval, but I do not hide from myself the fact that it is the first step towards a constitution." In a matter of 48 hours, Alexander II planned to release these plans to the Russian people. Instead, following his succession, Alexander III, under the advice of Konstantin Pobedonostsev, chose to abandon his father's reforms and went on to pursue a policy of reactionism and greater autocratic power.

The assassination triggered major suppression of civil liberties in Russia, and police brutality burst back in full force after experiencing some restraint under the reign of Alexander II, whose death was witnessed firsthand by his son, Alexander III, and his grandson, Nicholas II. Vowing not to have the same fate befall them, both emperors brought back repressive state security practices and curtailed the liberal judicial reforms implemented by Alexander II. Further, both of them assiduously used the Okhrana, a secret police service, to arrest protestors, spy on perceived dissidents, and uproot suspected rebel groups, creating further suppression of personal freedom for the Russian people. A series of anti-Jewish pogroms and antisemitic legislation, the May Laws, were yet another outcome of Alexander II's assassination.

Finally, the tsar's assassination also inspired anarchists to advocate "'propaganda by deed'—the use of a spectacular act of violence to incite revolution."

In 1881, the Alexander Church, designed by Theodor Decker and named after Alexander II, was completed in Tampere. Also, with construction starting in 1883, the Church of the Savior on Blood was built on the site of Alexander's assassination and dedicated in his memory.

== Marriages and children ==
=== First marriage ===
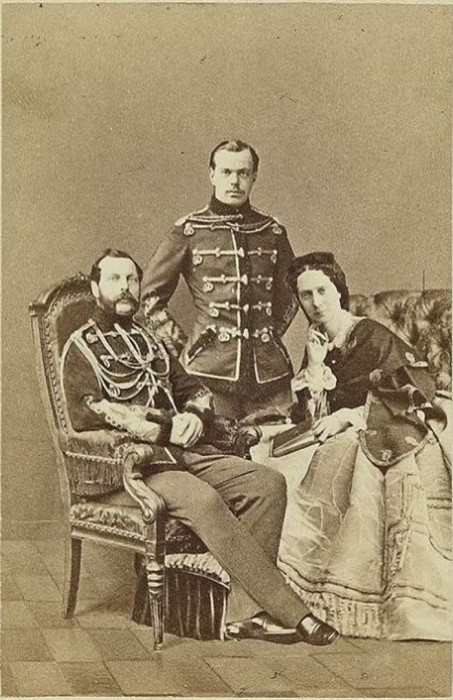
Emperor Alexander II and his wife, Empress Maria, with their son, the future Alexander III by Sergei Lvovich Levitsky 1870

In 1838–39, the young bachelor, Alexander made the Grand Tour of Europe which was standard for young men of his class at that time. One of the purposes of the tour was to select a suitable bride for himself. His father Nicholas I of Russia suggested Princess Alexandrine of Baden as a suitable choice, but he was prepared to allow Alexander to choose his own bride, as long as she was not Roman Catholic or a commoner. Alexander stayed for three days with the maiden Queen Victoria. The two got along well, but there was no question of marriage between two major monarchs.

In Germany, Alexander made an unplanned stop in Darmstadt. He was reluctant to spend "a possibly dull evening" with their host Louis II, Grand Duke of Hesse and by Rhine, but he agreed to do so because Vasily Zhukovsky insisted that his entourage was exhausted and needed a rest. During dinner, he met and was charmed by Princess Marie, the 14-year-old daughter of Louis II. He was so smitten that he declared that he would rather abandon the succession than not marry her. He wrote to his father: "I liked her terribly at first sight. If you permit it, dear father, I will come back to Darmstadt after England." When he left Darmstadt, she gave him a locket that contained a piece of her hair.

Alexander's parents initially did not support his decision to marry Princess Marie of Hesse. There were troubling rumors about her paternity. Although she was the legal daughter of Louis II, there were rumors that Marie was the biological daughter of her mother's lover, Baron August von Senarclens de Grancy. Alexander's parents worried that Marie could have inherited her mother's tendency to consumption. Alexander's mother considered the Hesse family grossly inferior to the Hohenzollerns and Romanovs.

In April 1840, Alexander's engagement to Princess Marie was officially announced. In August, the 16-year-old Marie left Darmstadt for Russia. In December, she was received into the Orthodox Church and received the names Maria Alexandrovna.

On 16 April 1841, aged 23, Tsesarevitch Alexander married Marie in St. Petersburg.

The marriage produced six sons and two daughters:

- Grand Duchess Alexandra Alexandrovna of Russia (30 August 1842 – 10 July 1849), nicknamed Lina, died of infant meningitis in St. Petersburg at the age of six
- Nicholas Alexandrovich, Tsesarevich of Russia (20 September 1843 – 24 April 1865), engaged to Princess Dagmar of Denmark
- Emperor Alexander III (10 March 1845 – 1 November 1894) he married Princess Dagmar of Denmark on 9 November 1866. They had six children.
- Grand Duke Vladimir Alexandrovich of Russia (22 April 1847 – 17 February 1909) he married Duchess Marie of Mecklenburg-Schwerin on 28 August 1874. They had five children.
- Grand Duke Alexei Alexandrovich (14 January 1850 – 14 November 1908) he married Alexandra Zhukovskaya in 1870. They had one son.
- Grand Duchess Maria Alexandrovna of Russia (17 October 1853 – 24 October 1920) she married Alfred, Duke of Saxe-Coburg and Gotha on 23 January 1874. They had six children.
- Grand Duke Sergei Alexandrovich of Russia (11 May 1857 – 17 February 1905) he married Princess Elisabeth of Hesse and by Rhine on 15 June 1884. They had no children.
- Grand Duke Paul Alexandrovich of Russia (3 October 1860 – 24 January 1919) he married Princess Alexandra of Greece and Denmark on 17 June 1889. They had two children. He remarried Olga Karnovich on 10 October 1902. They had three children.

Alexander particularly placed hope in his eldest son, Tsesarevich Nicholas. In 1864, Alexander II found Nicholas a bride, Princess Dagmar of Denmark, second daughter of King Christian IX of Denmark and younger sister to Alexandra, Princess of Wales and King George I of Greece. In 1865, Nicholas died of cerebrospinal meningitis. Alexander was devastated by Nicholas' death, and his nephew Grand Duke Alexander Mikhailovich of Russia reflected that "his shoulders were bent, and he walked so slowly that we all felt as though his loss had robbed him of all his strength."

Alexander's second son, Grand Duke Alexander became heir and married his late brother's fiancée. The couple married in November 1866, with Dagmar converting to Orthodoxy and taking the name Maria Feodorovna.

Alexander grew estranged from his second son, Grand Duke Alexander.

Alexander's favorite child was his daughter, Grand Duchess Marie Alexandrovna. He reflected that his daughter had "never caused us anything but joy. We lost our eldest girl and we had so ardently wished for another – her birth was a joy and a delight, not to be described, and her whole life has been a continuation." In 1873, a quarrel broke out between the courts of Queen Victoria and Alexander II, when Victoria's second son, Prince Alfred, made it known that he wished to marry the Grand Duchess. The tsar objected to the queen's request to have his daughter come to England in order to meet her, and after the January 1874 wedding in St. Petersburg, the tsar insisted that his daughter be granted precedence over the Princess of Wales, which the queen rebuffed. Later that year, after attending the engagement ceremonies of his second surviving son, Vladimir, to Marie of Mecklenburg-Schwerin in Berlin, Alexander II, with his third son, Alexei, accompanying him, made a visit to England. While not a state visit, but simply a trip to see his daughter, he nevertheless partook in receptions at Buckingham Palace and Marlborough House, inspected the artillery at the Royal Arsenal in Woolwich, reviewed troops at Aldershot and met both Prime Minister Benjamin Disraeli and the leader of the opposition, William Gladstone. Disraeli observed of the tsar that "his mien and manners are gracious and graceful, but the expression of his countenance, which I could now very closely examine, is sad. Whether it is satiety, or the loneliness of despotism, or fear of a violent death, I know not, but it was a visage of, I should think, habitual mournfulness."

In 1866, Alexander II took a mistress, Catherine Dolgorukova, with whom he would father three surviving children. In 1880, he moved his mistress and their children into the Winter Palace. Alexander's affair alienated all his children except Alexei and Marie Alexandrovna. Courtiers spread stories that the dying Empress Marie was forced to hear the noise of Catherine's children moving about overhead, but their respective rooms were actually far from each other. In May 1880, Grand Duchess Marie Alexandrovna visited Russia to see her dying mother. She was horrified to learn that Catherine lived in the Palace and she confronted him. Shocked by the loss of support from his daughter, he quietly retreated to Gatchina Palace for military reviews. The quarrel, however, evidently jolted his conscience enough to lead him to return to St. Petersburg each morning to ask after his wife's health.

Empress Marie Alexandrovna suffered from tuberculosis. She succumbed to it on 3 June 1880.

=== Second marriage ===
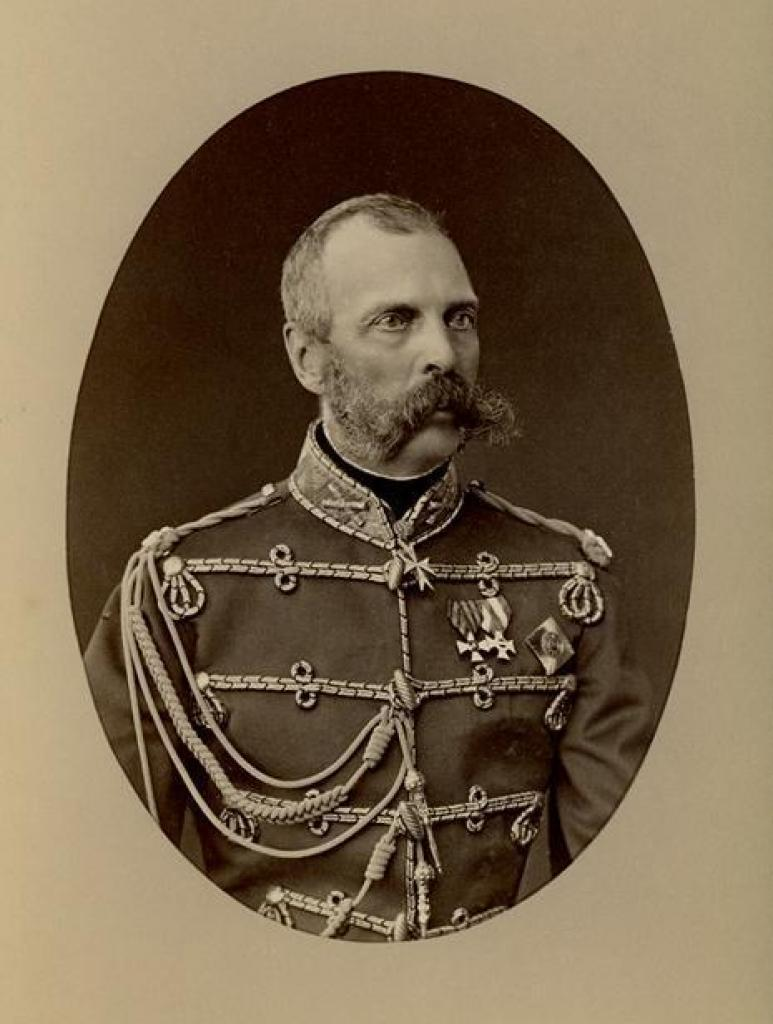
Tsar Alexander II, photo by Sergei Lvovich Levitsky, 1881 (The Di Rocco Wieler Private Collection, Toronto, Canada)

On 18 July [O.S. 6 July] 1880, Alexander II married his mistress Catherine Dolgorukova morganatically in a secret ceremony at Tsarskoye Selo. The action scandalized both his family and the court. Though he observed the minimum mourning period allowed by the Orthodox Church, 40 days between the death of a spouse and the remarriage of a surviving spouse, his haste in remarrying so soon after the death of the Empress elicited criticism in foreign courts. Alexander bestowed on Catherine the title of Princess Yurievskaya and legitimized their children.

Before their marriage, Alexander and Catherine had four children:

- Prince George Alexandrovich Yuryevsky (12 May 1872 – 13 September 1913) he married Countess Alexandra von Zarnekau on 11 February 1900 and they were divorced in 1908. They had one son.
- Princess Olga Alexandrovna Yurievskaya (7 November 1873 – 10 August 1925) she married Count Georg of Merenberg (son of Prince Nikolaus Wilhelm of Nassau and grandson of poet Alexander Pushkin) on 12 May 1895. They had three children.
- Prince Boris Alexandrovich Yurievsky (23 February – 11 April 1876)
- Princess Catherine Alexandrovna Yurievskaya (9 September 1878 – 22 December 1959) she married Prince Alexander Vladimirovich Baryatinsky (1870–1910) on 18 October 1901. They had two sons. She remarried Prince Sergei Platonovich Obolensky on 6 October 1916 and they were divorced in 1924.

== In fiction ==
Alexander II appears prominently in the opening two chapters of Jules Verne's Michael Strogoff (published in 1876 during Alexander's own lifetime). The Emperor sets the book's plot in motion and sends its eponymous protagonist on the dangerous and vital mission which would occupy the rest of the book. Verne presents Alexander II in a highly positive light, as an enlightened yet firm monarch, dealing confidently and decisively with a rebellion. Alexander's liberalism shows in a dialogue with the chief of police, who says "There was a time, sire, when NONE returned from Siberia", to be immediately rebuked by the Emperor who answers: "Well, whilst I live, Siberia is and shall be a country whence men CAN return."

The films Katia (1938) and Magnificent Sinner (1959) depict a highly fictionalized account of the Tsar's romance with the woman who became his second wife.

In The Tiger in the Well, Philip Pullman refers to the assassination – though he never names Alexander – and to the pogroms that followed. The anti-Jewish attacks play an important role in the novel's plot. Andrew Williams's historical thriller, To Kill A Tsar, tells the story of The People's Will revolutionaries and the assassination through the eyes of an Anglo-Russian doctor living in St Petersburg.

In the alternate history collection Back in the USSA (1997) by Eugene Byrne and Kim Newman, the first known point of divergence is that Alexander lived beyond 1881 and was able to complete his reforms.

Oscar Wilde's first play, Vera; or, The Nihilists, written in 1879, features Russian revolutionaries who seek to assassinate a fictional tsar. It was originally planned to be staged in 1881 in London, but when Alexander II was actually assassinated that year, the play was canceled. The play was produced again in New York in 1883, but to poor reviews, and has remained virtually unknown ever since.

Alexander II's reasons to sell Alaska to the United States in 1867 are fictionized in the epilogue of the novel Forty-Ninth by Boris Pronsky and Craig Britton, in a form of a letter to Catherine Dolgorukova. Prior to that, the book explores the events immediately after the first assassination attempt on the Tsar in 1866, as well as the relationship with his brother, Grand Duke Konstantin Nikolayevich.

== In nonfiction ==
Mark Twain describes a short visit with Alexander II in Chapter 37 of The Innocents Abroad, describing him as "very tall and spare, and a determined-looking man, though a very pleasant-looking one nevertheless. It is easy to see that he is kind and affectionate. There is something very noble in his expression when his cap is off."

== Honours ==
Domestic orders and decorations

- Knight of St. Andrew, 29 April 1818
- Knight of St. Alexander Nevsky, 29 April 1818
- Knight of St. Anna, 1st Class, 29 April 1818
- Knight of St. Vladimir, 1st Class, 1 January 1846
- Knight of St. George, 4th Class, 10 November 1850; 1st Class, 26 November 1869
- Knight of St. Stanislaus, 1st Class, 11 June 1865
- Golden Sword "For Bravery", 28 November 1877
- Poland: Knight of the White Eagle, 12 July 1829

Foreign orders and decorations

- Austrian Empire:
  - Grand Cross of the Royal Hungarian Order of St. Stephen, 1839
  - Knight of the Military Order of Maria Theresa, 1875
- Baden:
  - Knight of the House Order of Fidelity, 1839
  - Grand Cross of the Zähringer Lion, 1839
- Kingdom of Bavaria: Knight of St. Hubert, 1829
- Belgium: Grand Cordon of the Order of Leopold, 25 April 1856
- Empire of Brazil:
  - Grand Cross of the Southern Cross, 15 May 1845
  - Grand Cross of the Order of Pedro I, 14 February 1856
- Emirate of Bukhara: Order of Noble Bukhara, 1881
- Denmark: Knight of the Elephant, 23 April 1834; with Golden Collar, 1838
- (Saxe-Coburg and Gotha) (Duchy of Saxe-Altenburg) (Saxe-Meiningen) Ernestine duchies: Grand Cross of the Saxe-Ernestine House Order, June 1847
- France:
  - Kingdom of France: Knight of the Holy Spirit, 5 February 1824
  - French Empire: Grand Cross of the Legion of Honour, 30 July 1856
- Kingdom of Greece: Grand Cross of the Redeemer, 8 November 1835
- Kingdom of Hanover:
  - Grand Cross of the Royal Guelphic Order, 1838
  - Knight of St. George, 1840
- Electorate of Hesse: Grand Cross of the Golden Lion, 18 August 1847
- Grand Duchy of Hesse:
  - Grand Cross of the Ludwig Order, 25 March 1839
  - Grand Cross of the Merit Order of Philip the Magnanimous, 25 December 1843
  - Military Merit Cross, 16 May 1878
- Empire of Japan: Grand Cordon of the Order of the Chrysanthemum, 27 April 1877
- Mecklenburg: Grand Cross of the Wendish Crown, with Crown in Ore and Golden Collar, 21 June 1864
- Mexican Empire: Grand Cross of the Mexican Eagle, with Collar, 1865
- Monaco: Grand Cross of St. Charles, 22 July 1873
- Principality of Montenegro: Knight of St. Peter of Cetinje
- Nassau: Knight of the Gold Lion of Nassau, May 1858
- Netherlands:
  - Grand Cross of the Netherlands Lion, 2 December 1834
  - Grand Cross of the Military William Order, 13 September 1855
- Oldenburg: Grand Cross of the Order of Duke Peter Friedrich Ludwig, with Golden Crown, 27 September 1847
- Ottoman Empire:
  - Order of the Medjidie, 1st Class, 1 February 1860
  - Order of Osmanieh, 1st Class, 25 May 1871
- Duchy of Parma: Senator Grand Cross of the Constantinian Order of St. George, with Collar, 1851
- Persian Empire: Order of the Lion and the Sun, 1st Class, 10 July 1850
- Kingdom of Portugal: Grand Cross of the Sash of the Three Orders, 27 November 1855
- Kingdom of Prussia:
  - Knight of the Black Eagle, 10 June 1826; with Collar, 1856
  - Grand Commander's Cross of the Royal House Order of Hohenzollern, 30 May 1856
  - Pour le Mérite (military), 8 December 1869; with Oak Leaves, 8 December 1871; Grand Cross, 24 April 1878
- Kingdom of Sardinia: Knight of the Annunciation, 20 October 1845
- Saxe-Weimar-Eisenach: Grand Cross of the White Falcon, 12 September 1838
- Kingdom of Saxony: Knight of the Rue Crown, 1840
- Spain: Knight of the Golden Fleece, 14 May 1826
- Sweden-Norway: Knight of the Seraphim, 6 March 1826
- Two Sicilies: Grand Cross of St. Ferdinand and Merit, 20 January 1839
- United Kingdom: Stranger Knight of the Garter, 14 August 1867
- Württemberg:
  - Grand Cross of the Württemberg Crown, 1829
  - Knight of the Military Merit Order, 25 December 1850

=== Arms ===
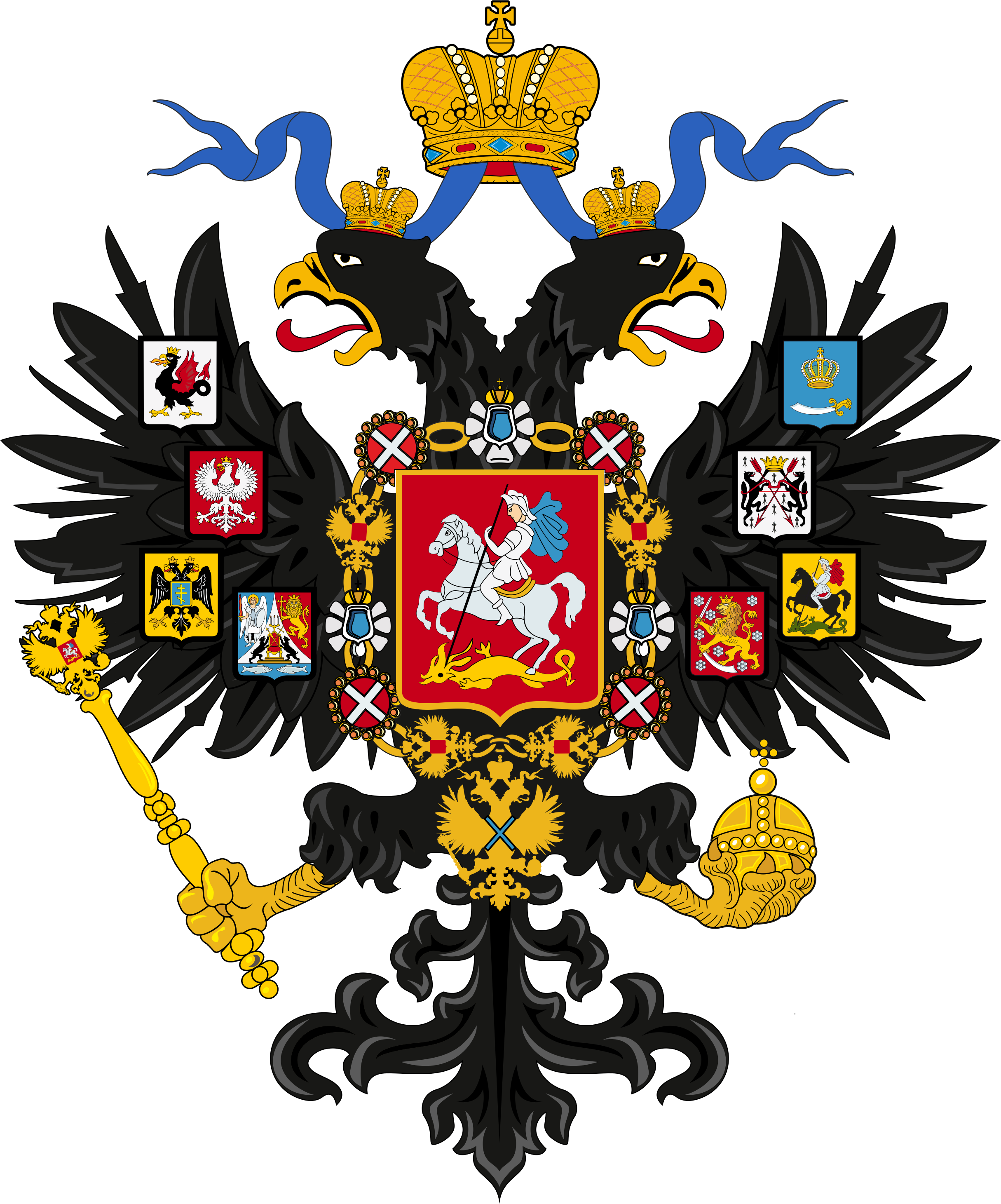
Lesser coat of arms of Russia 1856

== Gallery ==
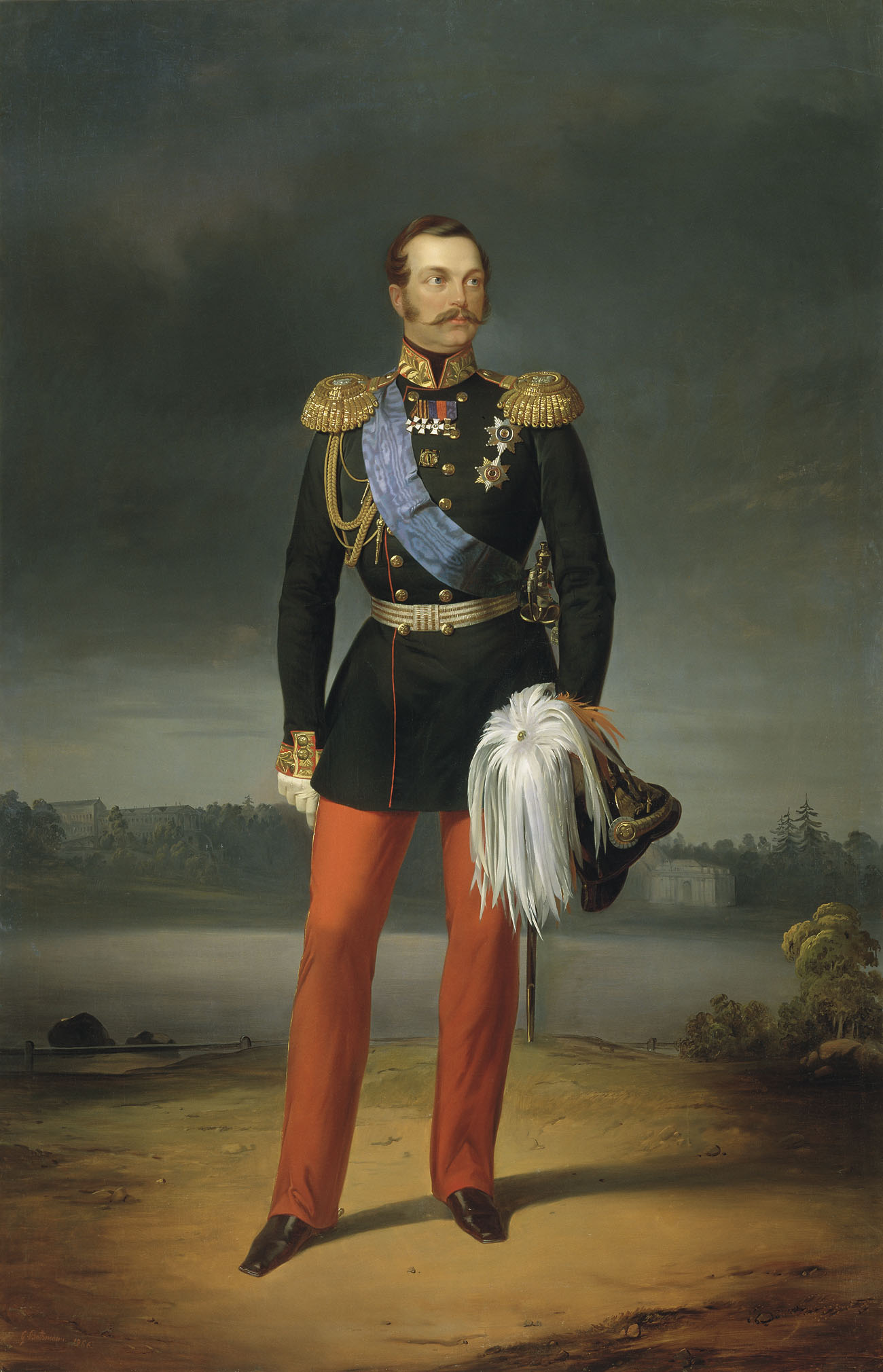
Portrait of Alexander II, 1856

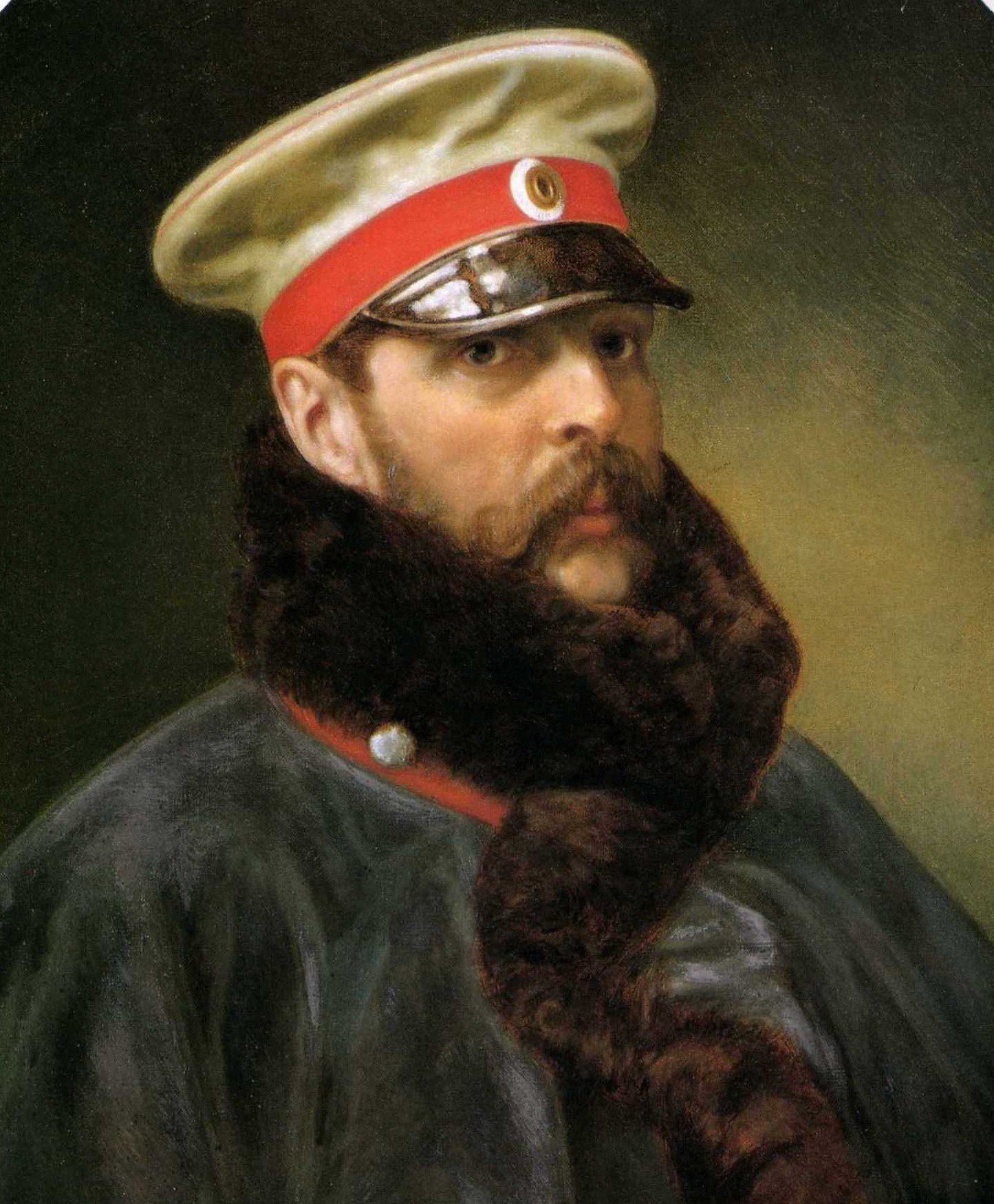
Portrait of Emperor Alexander II wearing the greatcoat and cap of the Imperial Horse-Guards Regiment. c. 1865

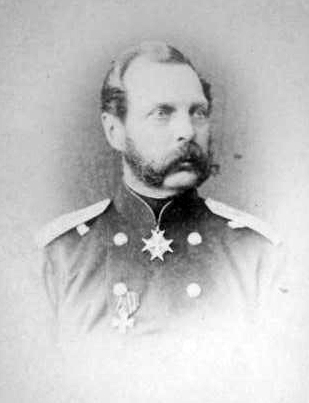
Alexander II, by Sergei Lvovich Levitsky, 1860 (The Di Rocco Wieler Private Collection, Toronto, Canada)

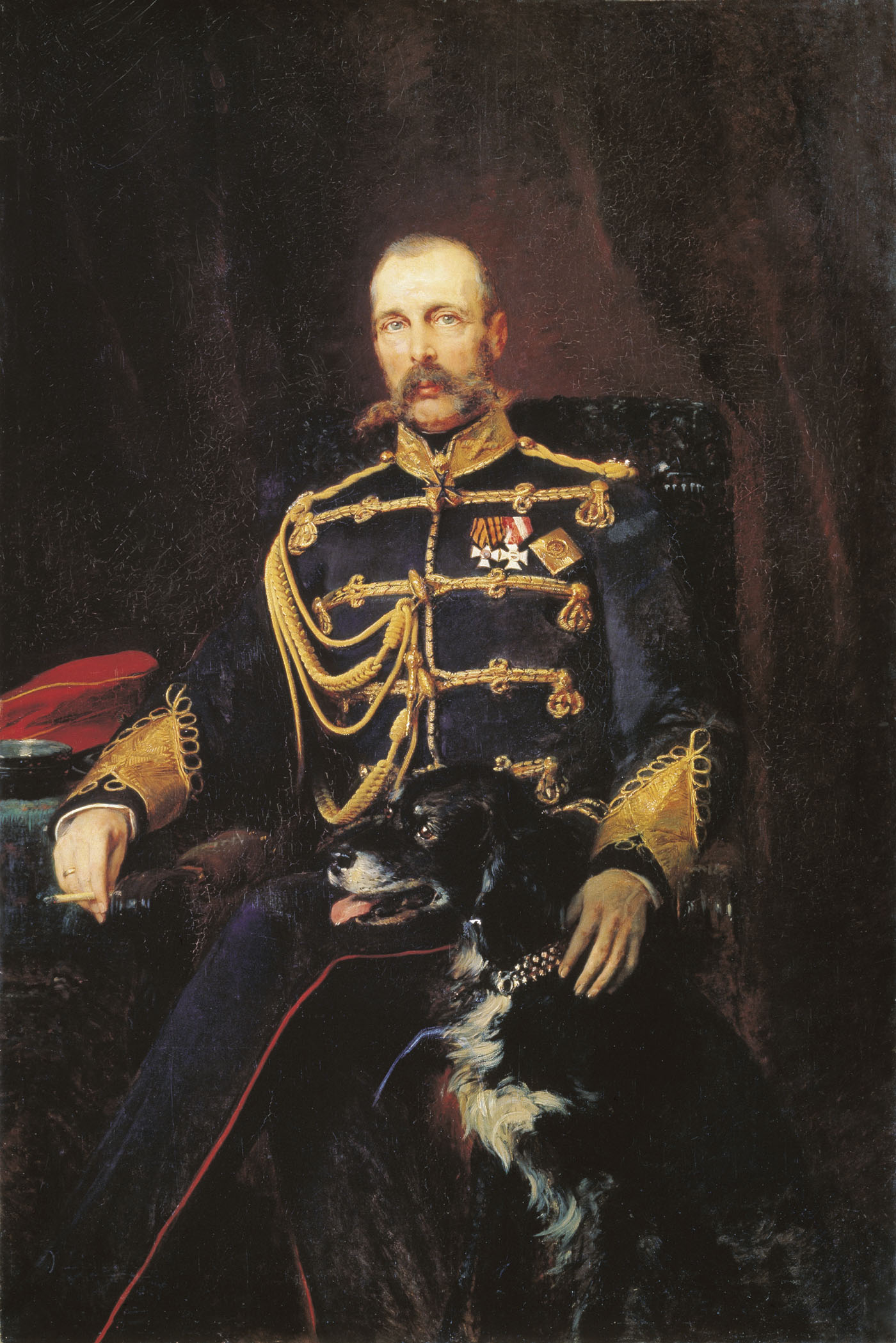
Alexander II, portrait by Konstantin Makovsky. 1881

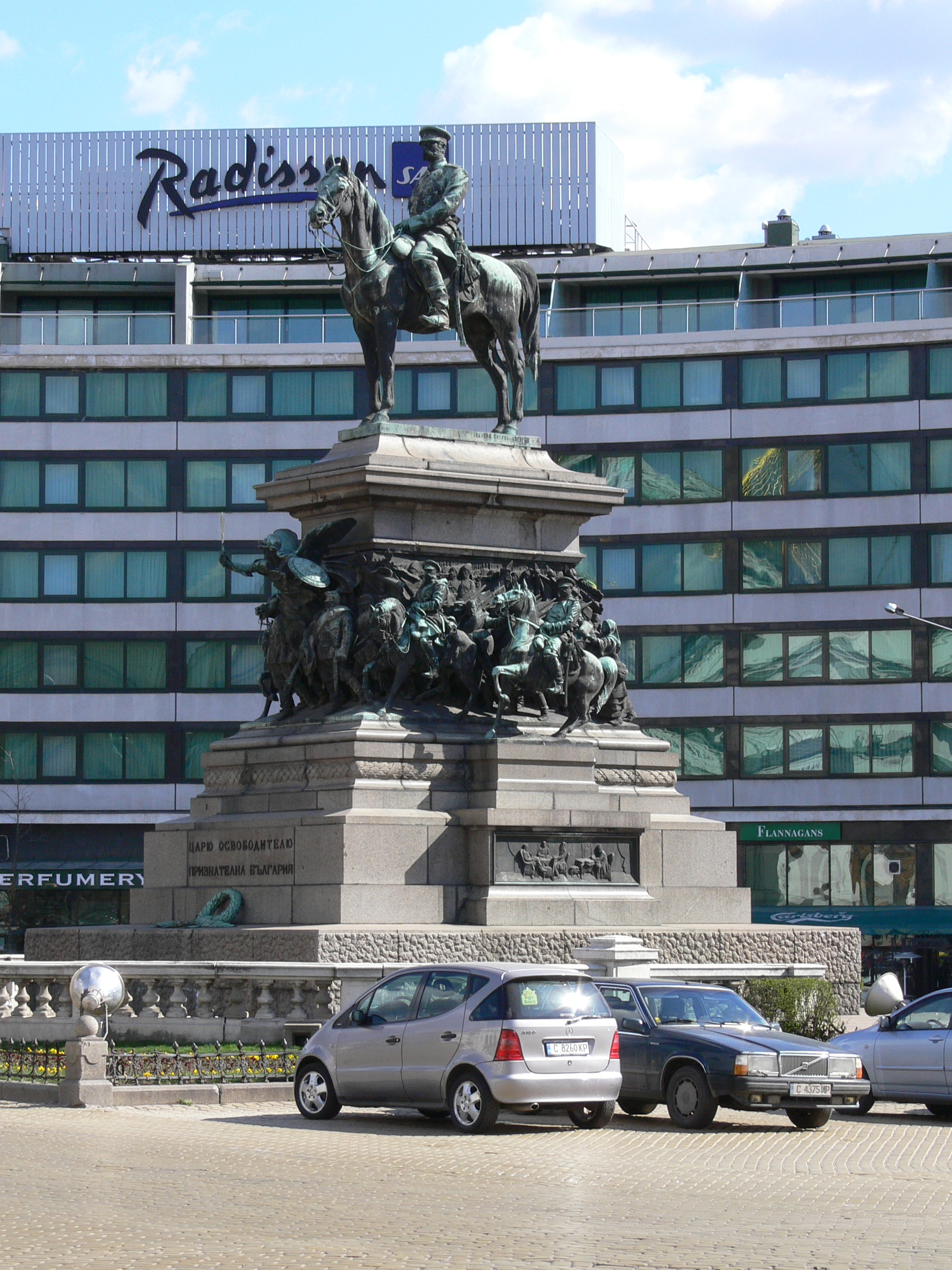
The Monument to the Tsar Liberator in Sofia commemorates Alexander II's decisive role in the Liberation of Bulgaria from Ottoman rule during the Russo-Turkish War of 1877–78.

The inauguration of Tsar Alexander II's statue in Chișinău (17 April 1886). The statue was removed after the union of Bessarabia with Romania

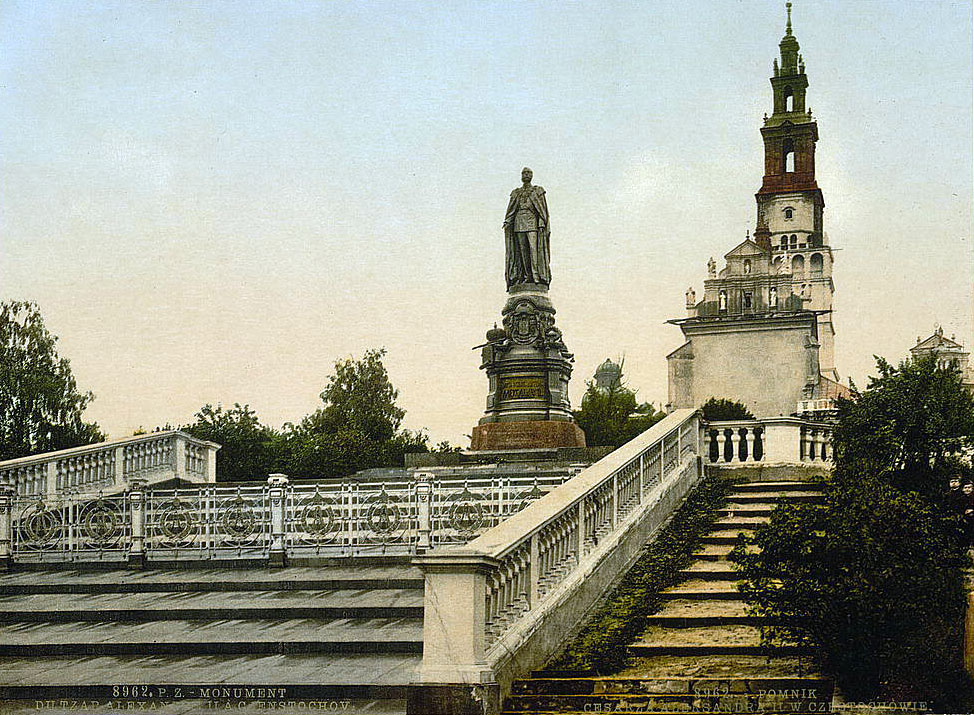
A monument to Alexander II in Częstochowa, removed after Poland gained independence

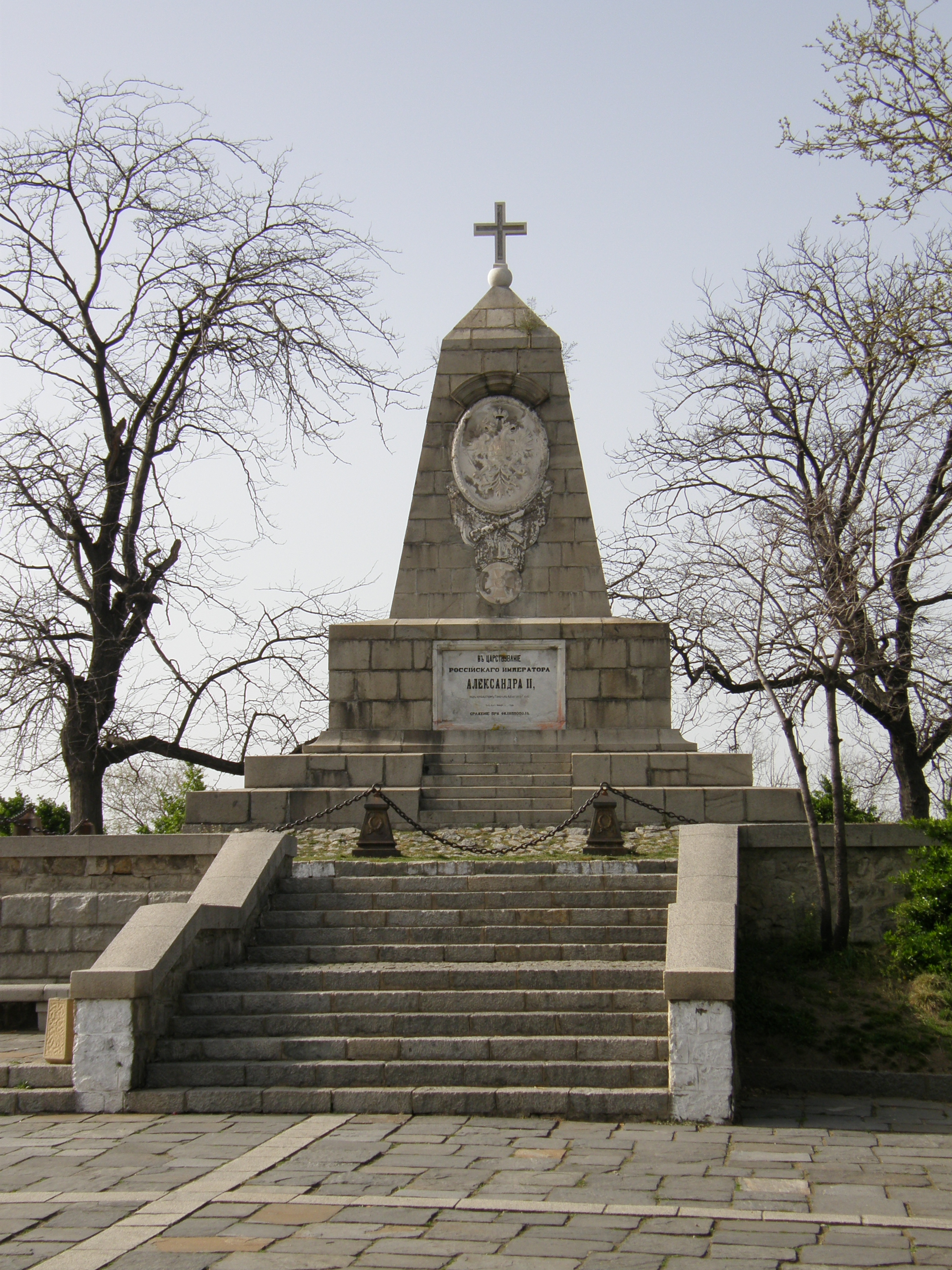
A monument to Alexander II in Plovdiv, Bulgaria.

== See also ==
- Third Section of His Imperial Majesty's Own Chancellery
- Tsars of Russia family tree

== Notes ==
Alexander II of Russia House of Holstein-Gottorp-Romanov Cadet branch of the House of Oldenburg Born: 29 April 1818 Died: 13 March 1881
Regnal titles
Preceded by Nicholas I	Emperor of Russia; Grand Duke of Finland; King of Poland; 2 March 1855–13 March 1881	Succeeded by Alexander III
