= Pavel Golohvastov =

Pavel Dmitrievich Golohvastov (Russian: Павел Дмитриевич Голохвастов, 27 February 1838 – 16 July 1892) was a Russian writer, historian, philologist, publicist, and slavophile.

== Biography ==
Pavel Golohvastov was born on 27 February 1838. His father was Dmitriy Pavlovich Golohvastov. Pavel graduated from the Page Corps. In 1857–1858, he worked in the Main Archive of the Minister of Internal Affairs; in 1858–1859, he served in the Asian department. Later, he served as a justice of the peace in Zvenigorodsky uyezd, and then was a managing director of Tashinskiy iron plant.

It 1865, acting as President of Nobility in one of the districts of the Moscow province, he demanded a Constitution from the Czar, Alexander the Second, and the Czar is reported to have replied, "...I would sign any Constitution you like if I were sure that this would be for the good of Russia. But I know that if I did it to-day, to-morrow Russia would go to pieces."

In 1882, Pavel started his service as an official "for special orders" in the Minister of Internal Affairs under the direction of Nikolay Ignatyev. At that time he was already a well-known authoritative theoretic of Slavophilia. Together with another notable slavophile, Ivan Aksakov, he participated in the preparation of the project of emperor's manifest that should have reanimated Zemsky Sobor. This project made Konstantin Pobedonostsev furious, which immediately forced the resignations of both Golohvastov and the minister.

Since a young age, Golohvastov studied the history of the Russian people, especially the period of the Time of Troubles. His legacy includes extensive works (manuscripts mostly), many of which are about Zemsky Sobor. He published several articles in Russky Arkhiv magazine and in the publications of Ivan Aksakov. He was the author of the drama "Alesha Popovich, a performance in 5 acts based on the Russian fairy tales" (Moscow, 1869), which was warmly accepted by critics and made him famous among contemporary writers. According to Brockhaus and Efron Encyclopedic Dictionary, the language he used in his works was heavy, with the strong inclination towards "samokovannii" (Russian: самокованный, self-forged) words.

Golohvastov married Olga Andreevna Andreevskaya (1840–1897), an illegitimate daughter of Evdokiya Rostopchina and Andrey Karamzin (colonel, a son of Nikolay Karamzin, 1814–1854). She was brought up in Switzerland, in the family of a priest. Olga was close to the community of slavophiles too. As a writer, she was an author of a few psychological plays.
