= Zevin =

- Municipality
- Location within Azerbaijan
- Coordinates: 39°01′30″N 48°21′19″E
- Country: Azerbaijan
- Rayon: Yardymli

Population
  - Total: 1,322
- Time zone: UTC+4 (AZT)
  - Summer (DST): UTC+5 (AZT)

Zevin (also, Zovin, Zëvin, and Zovik) is a village and municipality in the Yardymli Rayon of Azerbaijan. It has a population of 1,322.
