= Battle of Mrzygłód =

- Part of the January Uprising
Date	1 March 1863
Location	Mrzygłód (present-day district of Myszków)
Result	Polish victory

Belligerents
(Poland) Polish insurgents	Russian Empire

Commanders and leaders
Teodor Cieszkowski	

The Battle of Mrzygłód took place on 1 March 1863 near the village of Mrzygłód (now a district of Myszków), Russian-controlled Congress Poland. It was one of many skirmishes of the January Uprising, the anti-Russian rebellion of Poles. The battle resulted in Polish victory.

After a skirmish near the village of Panki, a party of Polish insurgents under Teodor Cieszkowski came to Mrzygłód, on 28 February 1863. The Russians, tipped by their informers, transferred here a unit of the Imperial Russian Army, which arrived at Mrzygłód by the Warsaw–Vienna railway. After two attacks, which were repulsed by the insurgents, Russian forces decided to withdraw towards Częstochowa, as their rear was exposed to another local insurgent unit.

On 1 March 1933, the 70th anniversary of the skirmish, a monument dedicated to the uprising was unveiled at the market square in Mrzygłód.

== Sources ==
- Stefan Kieniewicz: Powstanie styczniowe. Warszawa: Państwowe Wydawnictwo Naukowe, 1983. ISBN 83-01-03652-4.
- Relacja z 150. rocznicy Bitwy pod Mrzygłodem
