= Polsky =

Polsky may refer to:

- Daniel Polsky, American health economist.
- Dave Polsky, American film and television screenwriter
- Donald Perry Polsky (born 1928), American architect
- Éliane Vogel-Polsky (1926–2015), Belgian lawyer and feminist
- Gabe Polsky (born 1979), American film director, writer, and producer
  - Polsky Films, a film production company based in Los Angeles, California, founded by Gabe Polsky and his brother Alan Polsky
- Gregg Polsky, American professor
- Ned Polsky (1928–2000), American author and sociologist
- Ruth Polsky (1954-1986), booker and music promoter in New York City
- Tina Polsky (born 1968), American politician

== See also ==
- Yuryev-Polsky (disambiguation), several places in Russia
