= Yuryev =

Yuryev, sometimes spelled as Yuriev (Russian: Ю́рьев), or Yuryeva/Yurieva (feminine; Юрьева), is a Russian last name that is derived from the male given name Yury and literally means Yury's. It may refer to:

People

- Alexei Yuryev (1887–?), a Russian Bolshevik
- Boris Yuryev (1889–1957), a Russian/Soviet scientist in the field of aerodynamics
- Izabella Yurieva (1899–2000), Russian singer
- Timofey Yuriev (born 1973), a Russian/Soviet film director
- Sergey Yuriev (1821-1889), a Russian theatre critic, essayist and translator, uncle of the Russian/Soviet actor Yuri Yuryev (1872–1948)
- Vasili Yuryev (selectionist) (1879–1962), a Russian/Soviet selectionist and academician
- Vasili Yuryev (1955–2000), a Russian Internal Troops officer and Hero of Russia
- Yevgeny Yuryev (1951-2020), Soviet/Russian military officer
- Yuri Yuryev (1872–1948), a Russian/Soviet actor and People's Artist of the USSR
- Mikhail Zakharyin-Yuryev, a Russian statesman and diplomat of the 16th century
- Nikita Romanovich Zakharyin-Yuriev, another name for Nikita Romanovich (died 1586), a Muscovite boyar

Places

- Yuryev, a former Russian name of Tartu, Estonia
- Yuryev, a former name of Bila Tserkva in Ukraine
- Yuryev-Polsky District in Vladimir, Russia

Other

- Yuriev Monastery, a monastery in Velikiy Novgorod, Russia
- Yuryev reaction, a chemical reaction named after Soviet chemist Yu.K.Yuryev (1896-1965)

== See also ==
- Yuryevsky
- Yuryev-Polsky (disambiguation)
- Yuri's Day (disambiguation) (Yuryev Day in Russian)
