= Princess Olga Alexandrovna Yurievskaya =

Russian princess

Princess Olga Yurievskaya
- Countess George-Nicholas von Merenberg
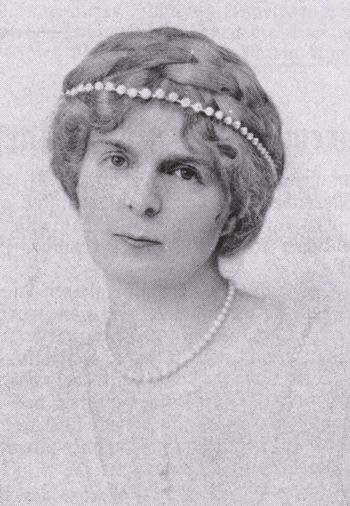
- Full name: Russian: О́льга Александровна Юрьевская
- Born: 7 November 1873; St. Petersburg, Russian Empire
- Died: 10 August 1925 (aged 51); Wiesbaden
- Buried: St Elizabeth's Orthodox Church, Wiesbaden
- Noble family: Yuryevsky (by birth); Merenberg (by marriage)
- Spouse: Count George-Nicholas von Merenberg (m. 1895)
- Issue Detail: Count Alexander Adolf; Count Georg Michael; Countess Olga Ekaterina
- Father: Alexander II of Russia
- Mother: Catherine Dolgorukova

Princess Olga Alexandrovna Yurievskaya (Russian: О́льга Алекса́ндровна Ю́рьевская; 7 November 1873 – 10 August 1925) was the natural daughter of Alexander II of Russia by his mistress (later his wife), Princess Catherine Dolgorukova. In 1880, she was legitimated by her parents' morganatic marriage.

After her father's assassination in 1881, her mother brought her up in France. In 1895, she married a German nobleman, becoming Countess Merenberg, and spent most of the rest of her life in Germany.

== Early life ==
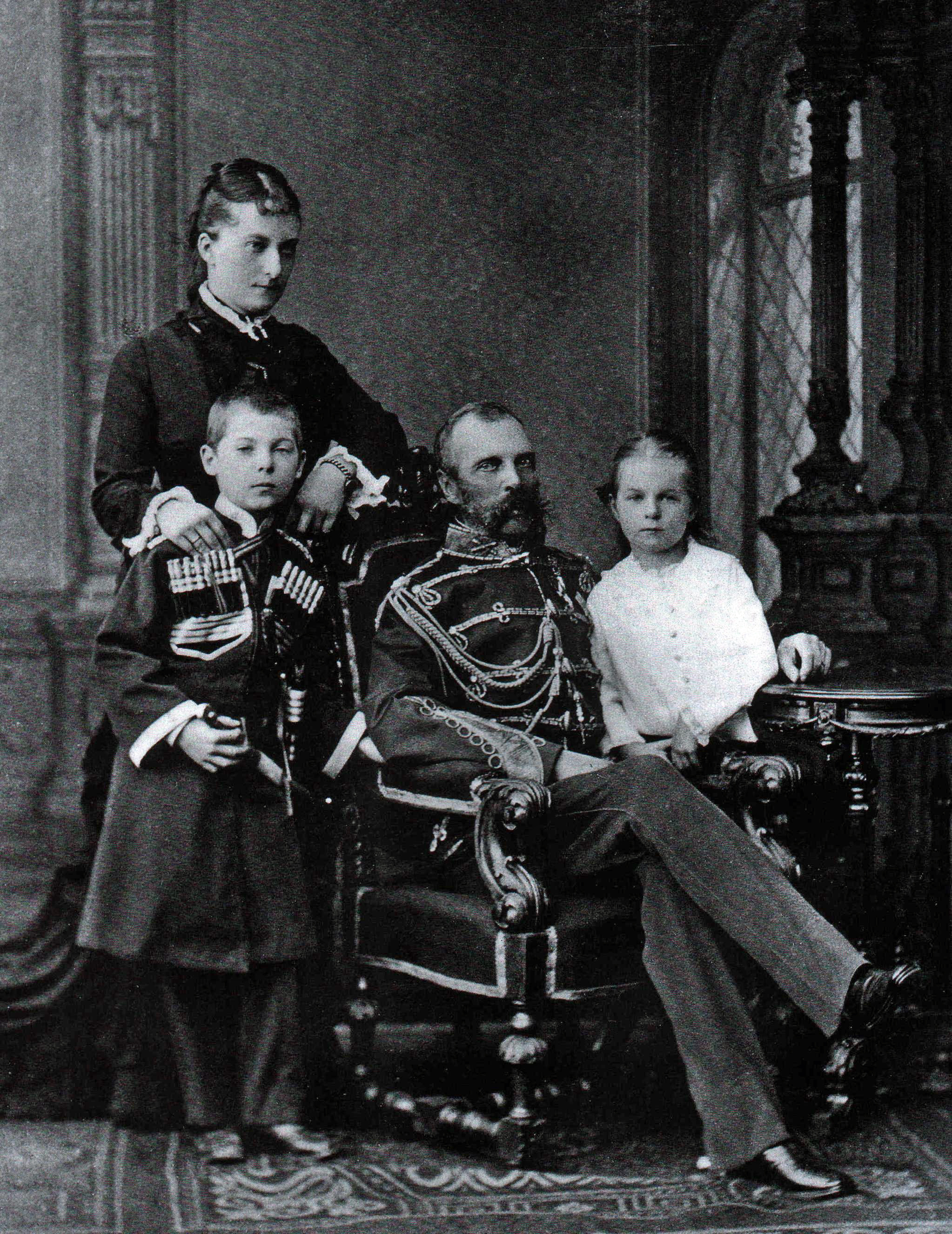
Alexander II and Princess Catherine Dolgorukova with their children George and Olga

Olga was born at Saint Petersburg, Russia, on 7 November 1873, while her mother was still the mistress of Tsar Alexander II. Her parents' morganatic marriage on 6 July 1880 legitimated her, and she acquired the surname of Yurievsky, the title of Princess (knyagina) and the style of Serene Highness (Svetlost).

Her father was assassinated in March 1881, when she was seven, and after that her mother took her three surviving children, Olga, George, and Catherine, to live in France. A second brother, Boris, had died in infancy.

== France and Germany ==
Olga's mother took a house in Paris and later others on the French Riviera. In 1891, she bought a house in Nice which she called the Villa Georges, in the boulevard Dubouchage. In France, the family was able to afford some twenty servants and a private railway carriage. However, the immediate family of the new Tsar, Nicholas II, looked on Catherine and her children with some disdain.

On 12 May 1895, in Nice, Olga married Count George-Nicholas von Merenberg (1871–1948), a grandson of Alexander Pushkin, becoming Countess Merenberg and the sister-in-law of Sophie of Merenberg, the morganatic wife of Grand Duke Michael Mikhailovich of Russia. Catherine asked the Tsar to be the sponsor of the wedding, but his mother, Maria Feodorovna, was appalled by the idea, so Nicholas declined. He later recalled that Catherine had been offended.

Most of the rest of Olga's life was spent in Germany, including the war years of 1914 to 1918. She had three children, one of whom died in infancy, and herself died in 1925 at Wiesbaden, aged 51.

== Children ==
- Count Alexander Adolf (1896–1897)
- Count George Michael (1897–1965), who married firstly in 1926 (divorced 1928) Paulette Kövér de Gyergyó-Szent-Miklós, and secondly in 1940 Elizabeth Müller-Uri (1903–1963)
  - Countess Clotilde von Merenberg (born 1941), married 1965 Enno von Rintelen
    - Alexander Enno von Rintelen (born 1966)
    - Georg Nicholas von Rintelen (born 1970)
    - Gregor von Rintelen (born 1972)
- Countess Olga Ekaterina Adda (1898–1983), who married in 1923 Count Mikhail Tarielovich Loris-Melikov (1900–1980)
  - Alexander Mikhailovich Loris-Melikov (born 1926), married in 1958 Micheline Selina Prunier
    - Anna Alexandrovna Loris-Melikova (born 1959)
    - Dominika Alexandrovna Loris-Melikova (born 1961)
    - Natalya Alexandrovna Loris-Melikova (born 1962)
    - Mikhail Alexandrovich Loris-Melikov (born 1964)

== Ancestors ==
Ancestors of Princess Olga Alexandrovna Yurievskaya

8. Paul I of Russia
4. Nicholas I of Russia
9. Duchess Sophie Dorothea of Württemburg
2. Alexander II of Russia
10. Frederick William III of Prussia
5. Princess Charlotte of Prussia
11. Duchess Louise of Mecklenburg-Strelitz
1. Princess Olga Alexandrovna Yurievskaya
12. Prince Mikhail Mikhailovich Dolgorukov
6. Prince Mikhail Mikhailovich Dolgorukov
13. Sofia Ossifovna de Ribas
3. Princess Ekaterina Mikhailovna Dolgorukova
14. Gavriil Fyodorovich Vishnevsky
7. Vera Gavrilovna Vishnevskaya
15. Sofia Mikhailovna Yeropkina
