= Yuryevsky =

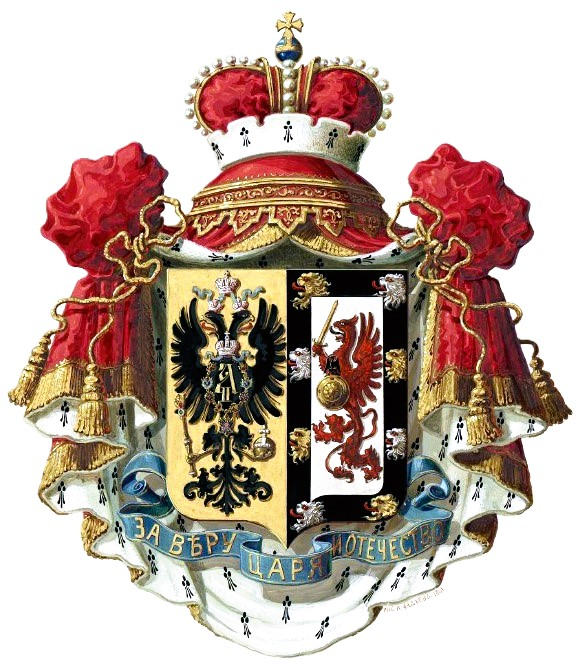
Princely arms of the family

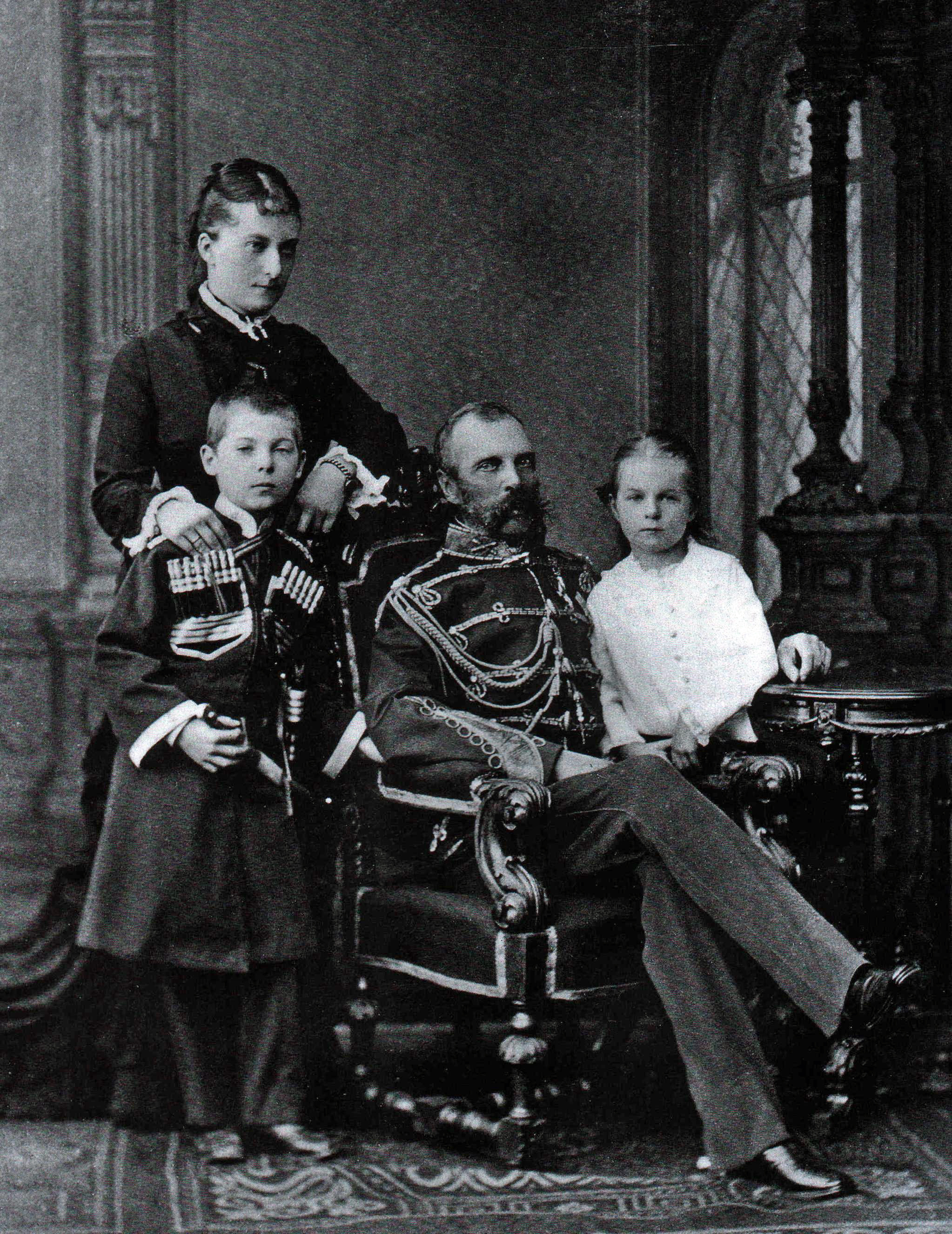
Alexander II, Catherine Dolgorukova and their children George and Olga

The House of Yuryevsky was the name of the Russian noble family that originated from the second, morganatic marriage of Emperor Alexander II of Russia to Princess Ekaterina Dolgorukova. Members of this family were styled as Prince Yuryevsky (Russian: Юрьевский - masculine) or Princess Yuryevskaya (Russian: Юрьевская - feminine). The family name was made as an homage to Princess Ekaterina's descent from Yuri Dolgorukiy, Prince of Rostov and Suzdal.

== Genealogy ==
- Catherine Dolgorukova (1847–1922), styled Princess Yuryevskaya after her morganatic marriage with Tsar Alexander II of Russia, and their three surviving children:
  - Prince George Alexandrovich Yuryevsky (12 May 1872 – 13 September 1913), who married Countess Alexandra von Zarnekau, herself the child of a morganatic marriage, and had issue. They later divorced.
  - Princess Olga Alexandrovna Yurievskaya (7 November 1873 – 10 August 1925), who married Georg Nikolaus, Count of Merenberg, likewise the child of a morganatic marriage.
  - Princess Catherine Alexandrovna Yurievskaya (9 September 1878 – 22 December 1959), whose first husband was Prince Alexander Vladimirovich Baryatinsky (1870–1910). Her second husband, later divorced, was Prince Serge Obolensky (1890–1978).

== Family tree ==
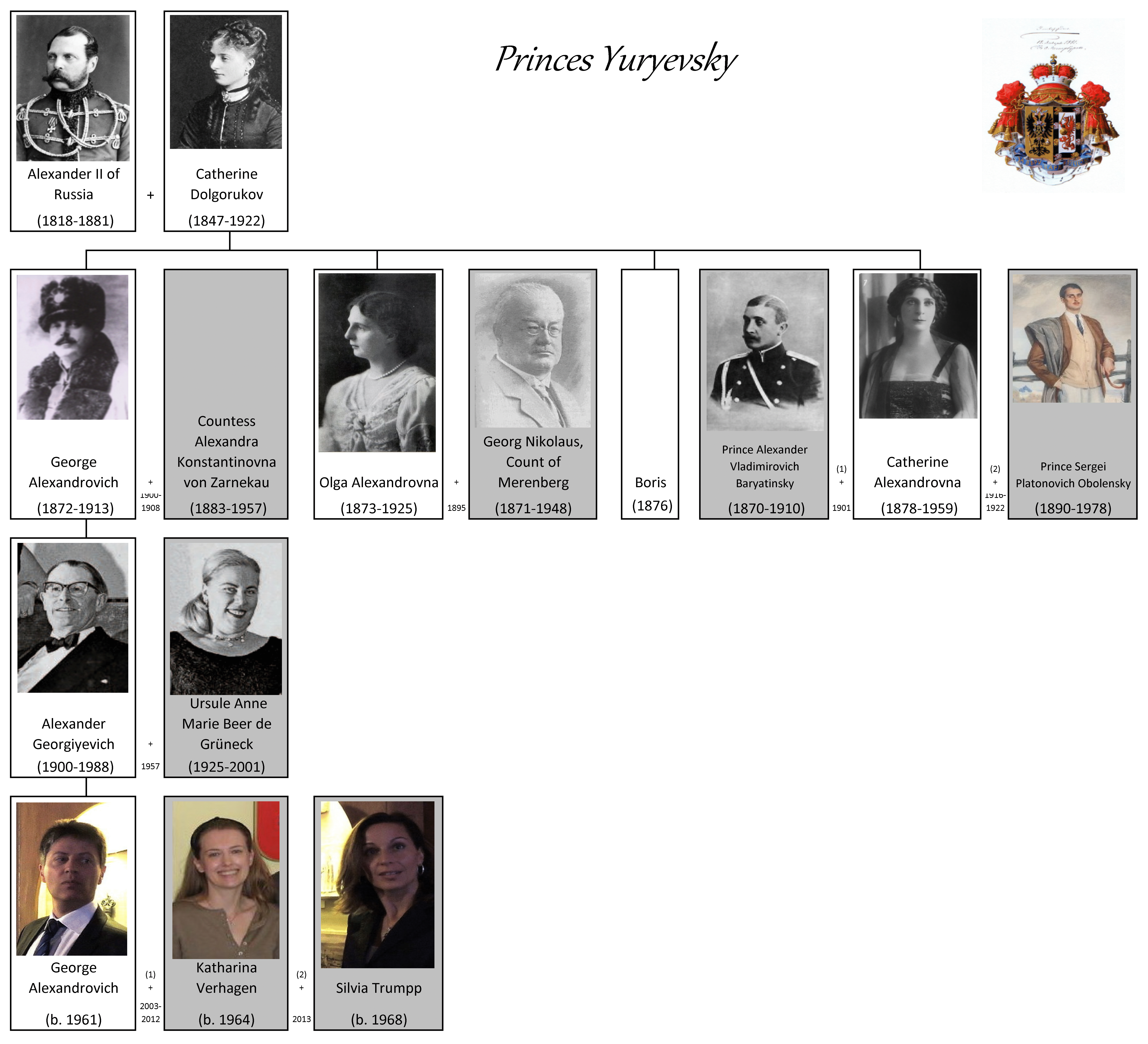
Family tree of the princes Yuryevsky (1872–2013)

== See also ==
- Svyatoslav Yuryevich, Prince Yuryevsky (Prince of Yuryev), son of Yury Dolgoruky (1099–1157)
- Yuryev (disambiguation)
- Branches of the Russian Imperial Family
