= Alexander Baryatinsky =

Alexander Baryatinsky may refer to:

- Aleksandr Baryatinsky (1815–1879), Russian field marshal
- Alexander Vladimirovich Baryatinsky (1870–1910), Russian soldier and bon vivant
