= Catherine Dolgorukova =

Mistress and morganatic wife of Tsar Alexander II (1847–1922)

- Princess Yurievskaya
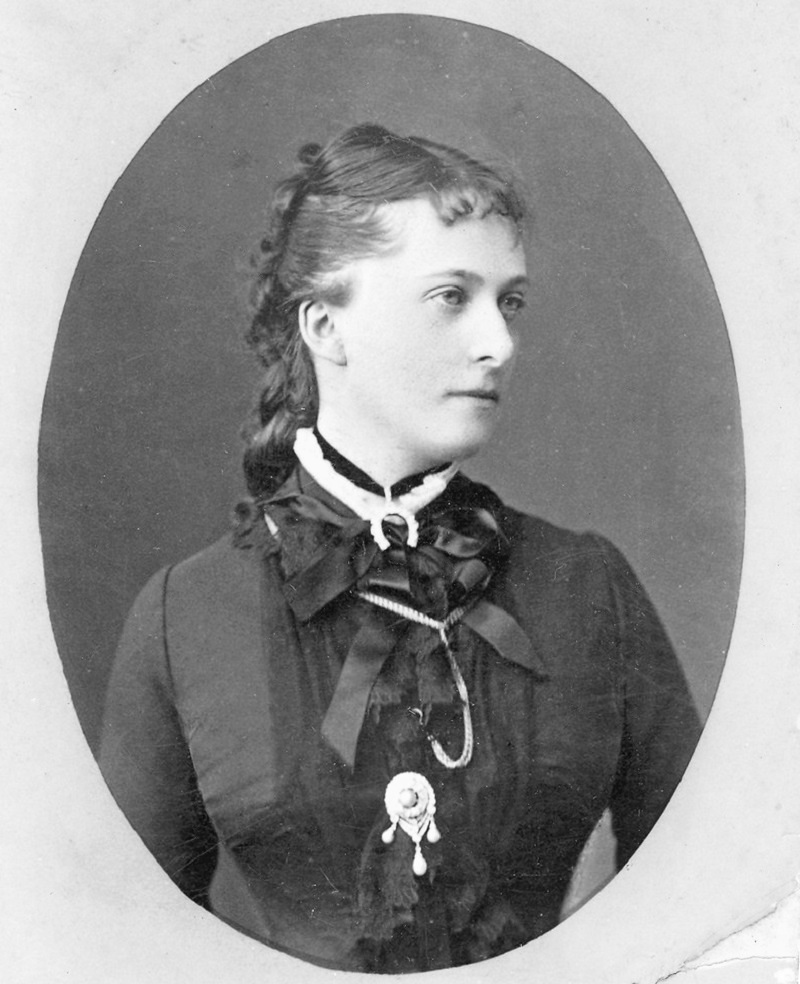
- Photo by Sergei Lvovich Levitsky and Rafail Sergeevich Levitsky, 1880
- Born: 14 November [O.S. 2 November] 1847; Moscow, Russian Empire
- Died: 15 February 1922 (aged 74); Nice, France
- Burial: Cimetière orthodoxe de Caucade, Nice, France
- Spouse: Alexander II of Russia (morganatic) (m. 1880; died 1881)
- Issue: Prince George Alexandrovich Yuryevsky; Princess Olga Alexandrovna Yurievskaya; Prince Boris Alexandrovich Yuryevsky; Princess Catherine Alexandrovna Yurievskaya
Names
- Yekaterina Mikhailovna Dolgorukova
- House: Dolgorukov
- Father: Prince Michael Dolgorukov
- Mother: Vera Vishnevskaya

Princess Catherine Dolgorukova (Russian: Екатери́на Миха́йловна Долгору́кова, romanized: Yekaterína Mikháyilovna Dolgorúkova; 14 November [O.S. 2 November] 1847 – 15 February 1922) was a Russian aristocrat and the daughter of Prince Michael Dolgorukov and his wife, Vera Vishnevskaya.

Catherine was a long-time mistress of Tsar Alexander II and later, as his morganatic wife, was given the title of Princess Yurievskaya (Russian: Светлéйшая княги́ня Ю́рьевская).

Alexander and Catherine already had three children when they formed a morganatic marriage on 18 July [O.S. 6 July] 1880, after the death of the Emperor's wife, Marie of Hesse and by Rhine, on 3 June [O.S. 22 May] 1880. A fourth child had died in infancy. Catherine became a widow with the assassination of Alexander II on 13 March [O.S. 1 March] 1881 by members of Narodnaya Volya.

== Background ==
Catherine was the elder daughter of Prince Michael Mikhailovich Dolgorukov (1816–1865) and his wife, Vera Gavrilovna Vishnevskaya (1820–1867). She had one younger sister, Princess Marie Mikhailovna Dolgorukova, Countess von Berg (1849–1907). Catherine was a direct descendant of Anastasia Romanova (d. 1655), the wife of Prince Boris Mikhailovich Lykov-Obolensky (d. 1648), one of the Seven Boyars of 1610. Anastasia was the daughter of Nikita Romanovich (Russian: Никита Романович; born c. 1522 – 23 April 1586), also known as Nikita Romanovich Zakharyin-Yuriev, who was a prominent boyar of the Tsardom of Russia. His grandson, Tsar Michael I (r. 1613–1645), founded the Romanov dynasty of Russian tsars. Anastasia was the paternal aunt of Tsar Michael I of Russia and the paternal niece of Tsaritsa Anastasia Romanovna Zakharyina-Yurieva of Russia.

== Appearance ==
One contemporary described the young Catherine as "of medium height, with an elegant figure, silky ivory skin, the eyes of a frightened gazelle, a sensuous mouth, and light chestnut tresses."

Catherine's nephew-in-law Grand Duke Alexander Mikhailovich of Russia wrote: "[I] couldn't take my eyes off her – I liked the sad expression of her beautiful face and the radiance of her rich blonde hair."

Some courtiers described Catherine as "vulgar and ugly". Konstantin Pobedonostsev wrote that "the eyes, by themselves, would be attractive, I suppose, only her gaze has no depth – the kind in which transparency and naïveté meet with lifelessness and stupidity ..."

== Mistress of Alexander II ==
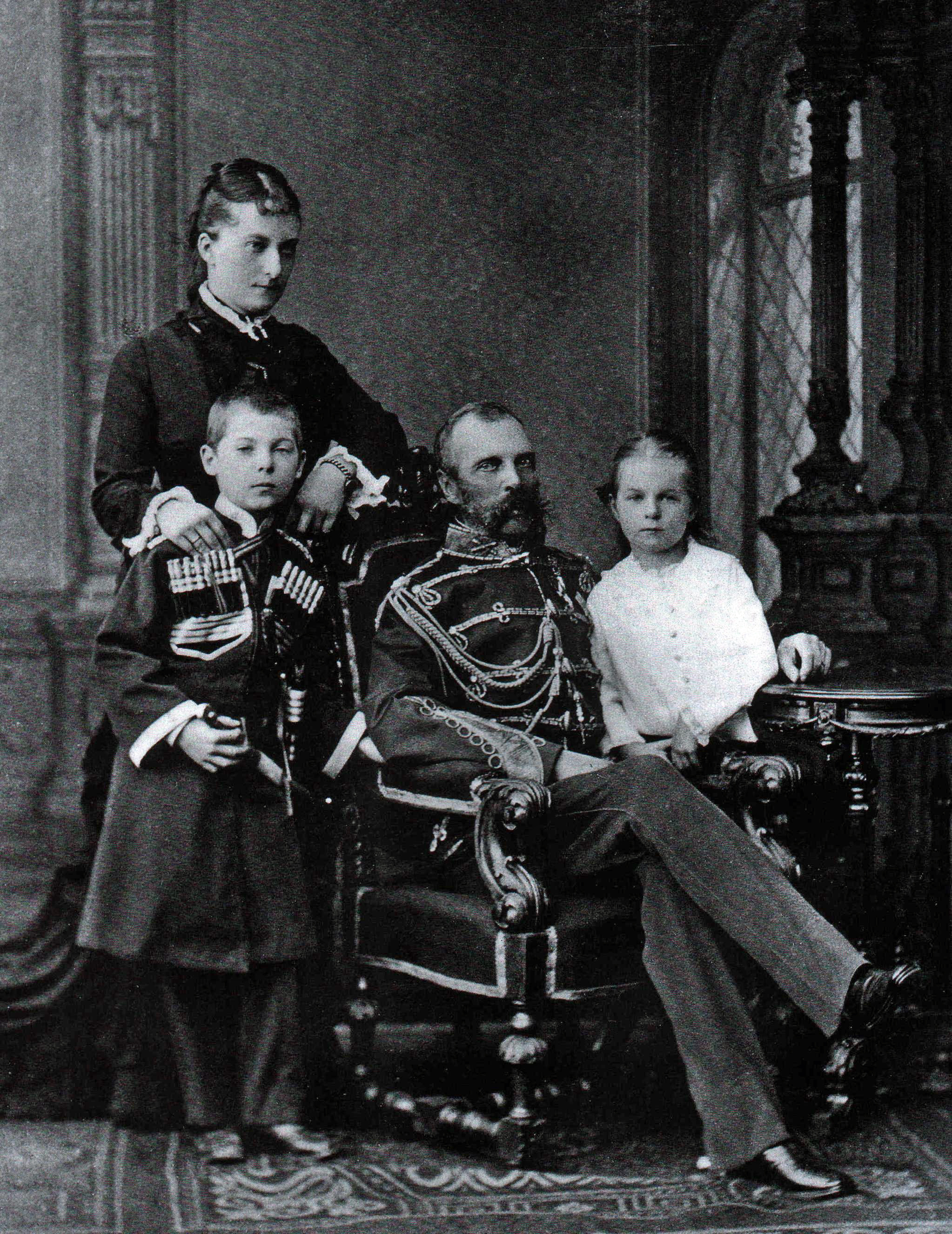
Emperor Alexander II, Princess Catherine Dolgorukova with their children George and Olga

In 1859, 10-year-old Catherine met 41-year-old Alexander II when he paid a visit to her father's estate. On the 150th anniversary of Peter the Great's victory over Charles XII of Sweden, he observed military maneuvers near Poltava. He later reflected: "I made your acquaintance when you weren't even eleven but you've only got more beautiful every year since."

After the death of her penniless father, Catherine and her sister Maria were sent to the Smolny Institute of Noble Maidens in St. Petersburg, a school for well-born girls. Her mother appealed to Court Minister Count Nikolay Adlerberg, who arranged for Alexander to pay for their education and that of their four brothers.

In the fall of 1864, Alexander met the 16-year-old Catherine at the Smolny Institute on an official visit. He visited her at the school and took her for walks and on carriage rides. Catherine had liberal opinions, formed in part by her time at the school, and she discussed them with him. He later arranged for her to become a lady-in-waiting to his wife, who was suffering from tuberculosis.

Catherine liked the Emperor and enjoyed being in his company, but she did not want to become one of a series of mistresses. Though her mother and the headmistress of the Smolny Institute both urged her to seize the opportunity to better her circumstances and those of her family, Catherine and Alexander did not actually become intimate until July 1866, when she was moved by her pity for the Emperor after the death of his eldest son, Nicholas Alexandrovich, Tsarevich of Russia, and after an attempt to assassinate him. Her mother had died two months before. That night, she later recalled in her memoirs, the still married Emperor told her: "Now you are my secret wife. I swear that if I am ever free, I will marry you."

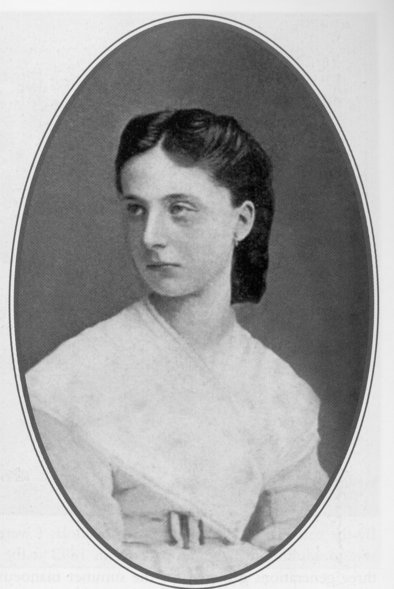
A teenage Catherine

Alexander insisted that Catherine and their children remain nearby. He saw her three or four times a week when she was escorted by the police to a private apartment in the Winter Palace and they wrote to one another every day and sometimes several times each day, often discussing the pleasure they found in making love. In one 28-page letter, written when Catherine was pregnant, she asked the Emperor to remain faithful to her "for I know you are capable in one moment when you want to make it, to forget that you desire only me, and to go and make it with another woman." Twenty nine of the previously unpublished passionate letters the couple wrote to one another were auctioned off in May 2007 for high sums. Alexander II sketched Catherine in the nude, rented her a mansion in St. Petersburg, and thought of her constantly.

Alexander II and Catherine went to great lengths to hide their relationship. They never signed their letters to one another with their real names and used the code word "bingerle" to refer to the sex act. When she went into labor with her third child, Boris, in February 1876, Catherine insisted on being taken to the Winter Palace, where she gave birth in the Emperor's rooms, but the baby was taken back to Catherine's private residence while Catherine recovered from childbirth in the Emperor's rooms for nine days. Boris caught cold and died a few weeks later.

Alexander II's family and court disapproved of their relationship. Catherine was accused of scheming to become Empress and influencing Alexander towards liberalism. Allegedly, she engaged with unscrupulous businessmen. On 1 March 1880, there was an explosion in the dining room of the Winter Palace. Alexander ran upstairs to Catherine's rooms, shouting "Katya, my dearest Katya!" Alexander's brother-in-law Prince Alexander of Hesse and by Rhine was furious that he had forgotten Empress Marie, who was also in the palace and might have been injured in the assassination attempt.

Fearing that she might become the target of assassins, Alexander moved Catherine and their children to the third floor of the Winter Palace by the winter of 1880. Courtiers spread stories that Alexander's dying wife was forced to hear the noise of Catherine's children moving about overhead, but the rooms of Empress Marie and Catherine were far apart. Though the Emperor had been unfaithful on many occasions in the past, his relationship with Catherine began after the Empress, who had had eight children, stopped having intercourse with her husband on the advice of her doctors. After the Empress asked to meet his children with Catherine, the Emperor brought their two older children, George and Olga, to the Empress's bedside and she kissed and blessed both children. Both the Emperor and his wife were in tears during the meeting.

== Marriage to Alexander II ==
Shortly after Empress Marie died, Alexander decided to marry Catherine. When Empress Marie died on 22 May, he wrote "My double life ends today. I am sorry but She [Catherine] doesn't hide her joy. She talks immediately about legalizing our situation; this mistrust kills me. I'll do all for her but not against the national interest." On 23 May, he decided to marry Catherine as soon as the mourning period was over. He promised to crown her as Empress on 1 August 1881. He granted her the title of Most Serene Princess Yurievskaya and legitimized their children, but he stipulated that they had no right to the throne as children of a morganatic marriage.

Alexander and Catherine's marriage was tremendously unpopular with the Russian public. Father Bazhenov, who had witnessed Alexander's marriage to Empress Marie, refused to witness his marriage to Catherine. His childhood friend Adlerberg tried to "dissuade him by citing the unpleasant impression it would make unless he waited a year after the empress's death." Daria Tyutcheva, once Empress Marie's lady-in-waiting, resigned from her position in the Imperial court. She confided to Countess Alexandra Tolstaya that she resigned because "I can't promise not to make a public scene and even spit in the face of Princess Yurievskaya at the first opportunity." Konstantin Pobedonostsev, a courtier, wrote, "How it irks me to see her in the place of the dear, wise, and graceful Empress!"

Alexander's family was furious over his marriage to Catherine. His only legitimate daughter and favorite child Grand Duchess Maria Alexandrovna of Russia wrote to him, “I pray that myself and my junior brothers, who were particularly close to Mama, would one day be able to forgive you.” His sister-in-law, Princess Cecile of Baden, declared "I shall never recognize that scheming adventuress. I hate her!" His daughter-in-law Duchess Marie of Mecklenburg-Schwerin wrote that she hoped "that the Tsar's eyes must at length be opened to the worthless of the creature who seems to have him bound as in a spell, to make him deaf and blind."

Alexander's family refused to accept Catherine. At a Winter Palace reception in February 1881, Tsesarevna Maria Feodorovna refused to kiss Catherine. Alexander II was furious and chastised his daughter-in-law: "Sasha (the future Alexander III) is a good son, but you – you have no heart." Maria Feodorovna refused to allow her children to stay with Catherine and her children. Grand Duke Alexander Mikhailovich wrote that his father, the Emperor's youngest brother Grand Duke Michael Nikolaevich of Russia, pitied Catherine because the family treated her so coldly.

Catherine was angry about the way Alexander's family treated her. She complained "I ceded ... the honours [to Alexander's daughters-in-law], but they shouldn't forget I was the wife of their Sovereign." She frequently complained about "the monsters in [Alexander's] family", whom she called "as heartless as they were uneducated."

Despite the criticisms, Alexander II was delighted to be married to his long-time mistress and open about their relationship. In his memoirs, Grand Duke Alexander Mikhailovich of Russia wrote that the Emperor behaved like a teenage boy when in Catherine's presence and she also appeared to adore him. Alexander wrote to his sister Queen Olga of Württemberg about his happiness with Catherine: "She preferred to renounce all social amusements and pleasures so desired by young ladies of her age ... and has devoted her entire life to loving and caring for me. Without interfering in any affairs, despite the many attempts by those who would dishonestly use her name, she lives only for me, dedicated to bringing up our children."

There were fears that Alexander planned to make Catherine his Empress and supplant his legitimate heirs with his children by Catherine. During a family dinner, he asked the seven-year-old George, his eldest child by Catherine, if he would like to become a Grand Duke. "Sasha (Alexander), for God's sake, drop it!" Catherine rebuked him, but the exchange fueled the family's fears.

Though they were happy together, the troubled political situation and constant threats of assassination cast a shadow over their lives together. On the day that Alexander II was assassinated, Catherine pleaded with him not to go out because she had a premonition that something would happen to him. He quieted her objections by making love to her on a table in her rooms and leaving her behind. Within hours he was mortally wounded and was brought back to the palace, broken and bleeding.

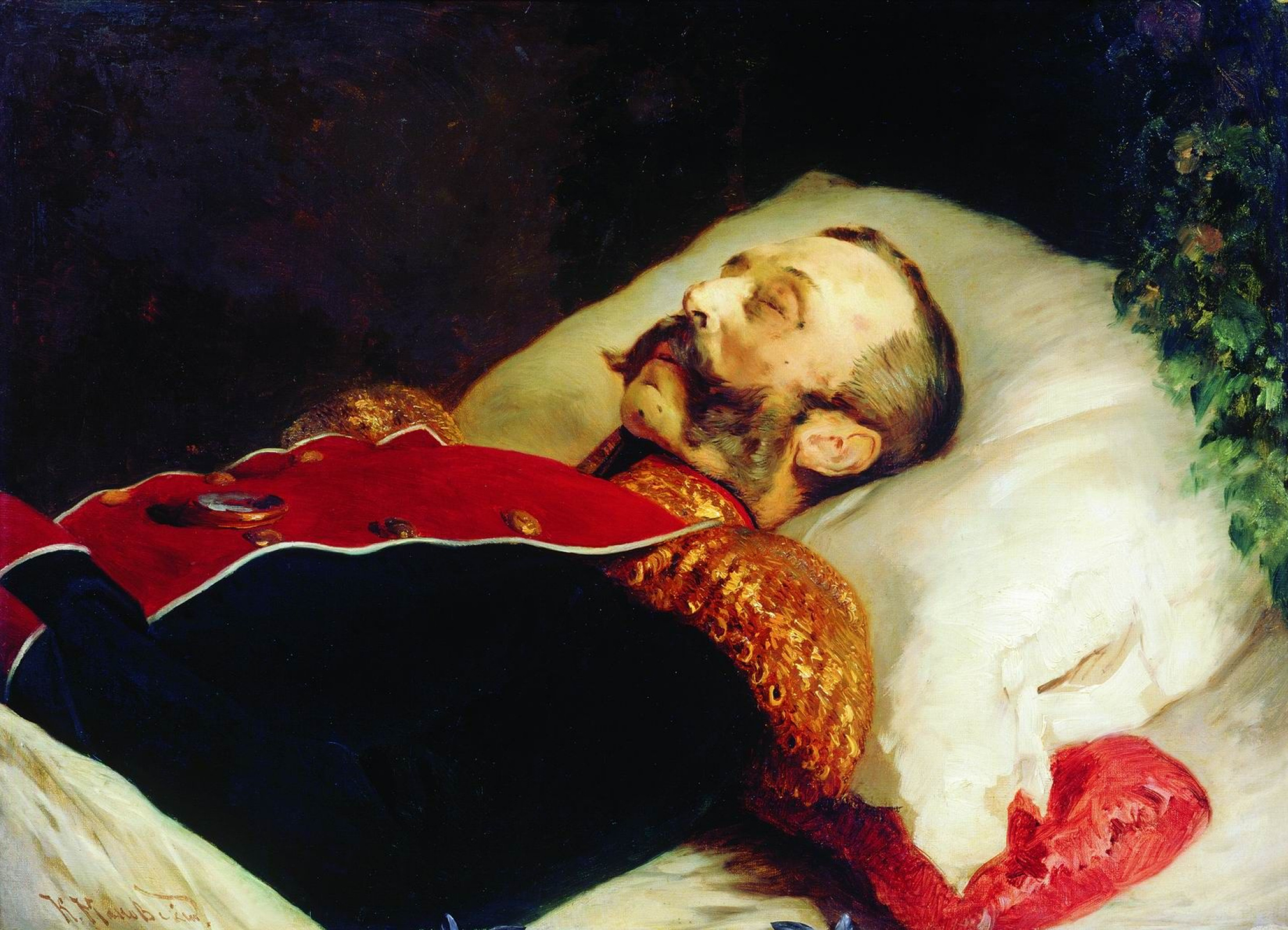
Alexander II on his deathbed in 1881

When she heard the news, Catherine ran half-dressed into the room where he lay dying and fell across his body, crying "Sasha! Sasha!" In his memoirs, Grand Duke Alexander Mikhailovich recalled that the pink and white négligée she was wearing was soaked in Alexander's blood. At his funeral, Catherine and her three children were forced to stand in an entryway of the church and received no place in the procession of the Imperial Family. They were also forced to attend a separate Funeral Mass from the rest of the family.

== Later life ==
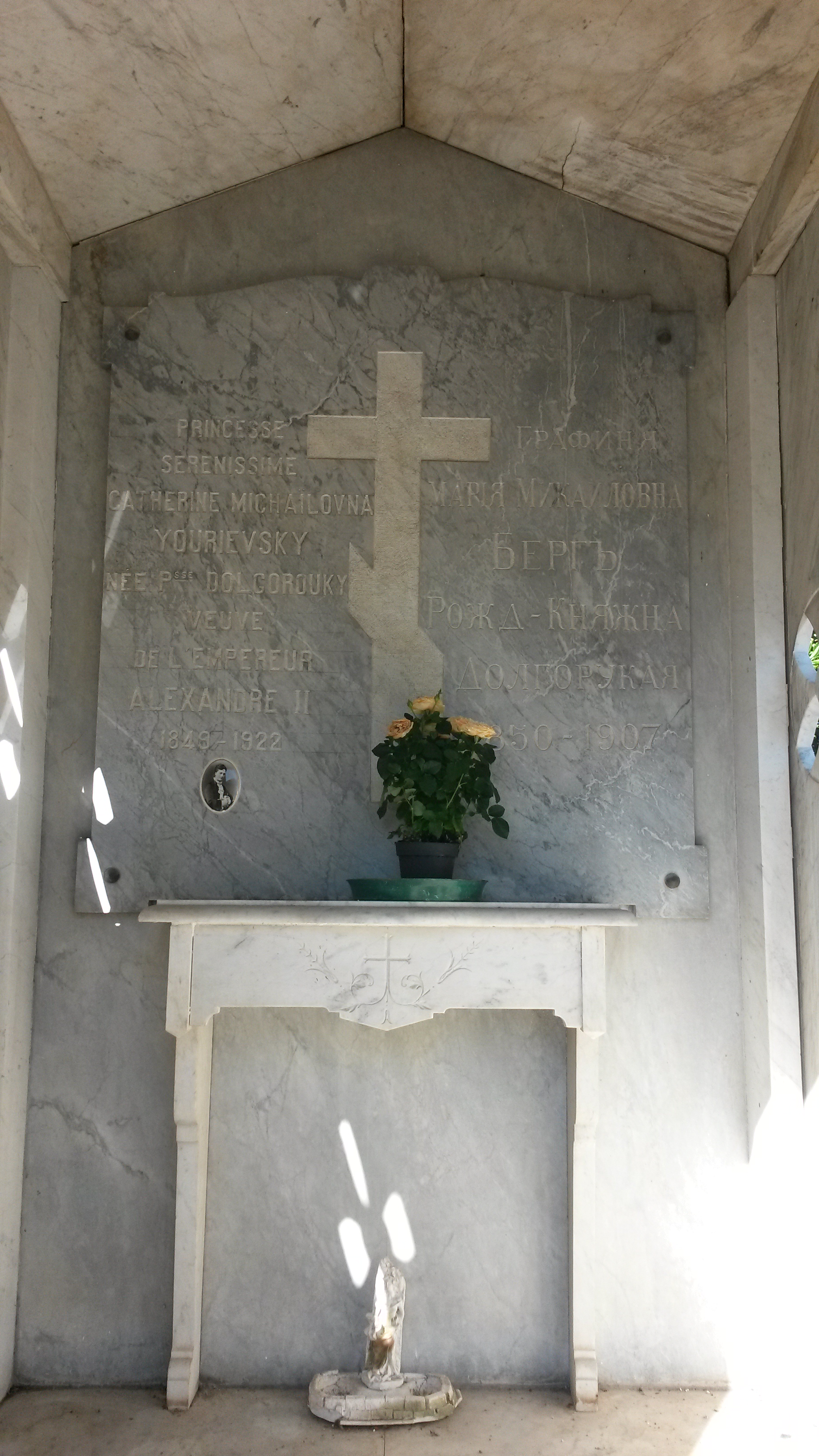
Princess Catherine Dolgorukova's grave in Nice

After the Emperor's death, Catherine received a pension of approximately 3.4 million rubles on condition that she gave up the right to live in the Winter Palace or any of the Imperial residences in Russia in return for a separate residence in St. Petersburg, The Little Marble Palace, for herself and the three children.

In 1913 she settled in Paris, in Biarritz and in Nice on the French Riviera, where she became known as a fashionable hostess and was used to having twenty servants and a private railway car, though the Romanov family continued to look upon her and her children with disdain. Alexander III had his secret police spy on her and received reports on her activities in France. Grand Duke George Alexandrovich of Russia used illness as an excuse to avoid socializing with her in 1895. Nicholas II recalled that Catherine was offended when he refused to be the sponsor when her daughter Olga married Count George-Nicholas of Merenberg in the spring of 1895. His mother, the dowager empress Maria Feodorovna, had been appalled by the idea, so Emperor Nicholas declined. Catherine's son George was an abysmal failure in the Imperial Russian Navy, as Grand Duke Alexei Alexandrovich of Russia informed her by letter, but he was granted a place in the Cavalry School.

Catherine survived her husband by forty-one years and died in her villa in Nice, just as her money was running out. By then she had been forced to sell her houses in Paris and Biarritz under their true market value.

== Children ==
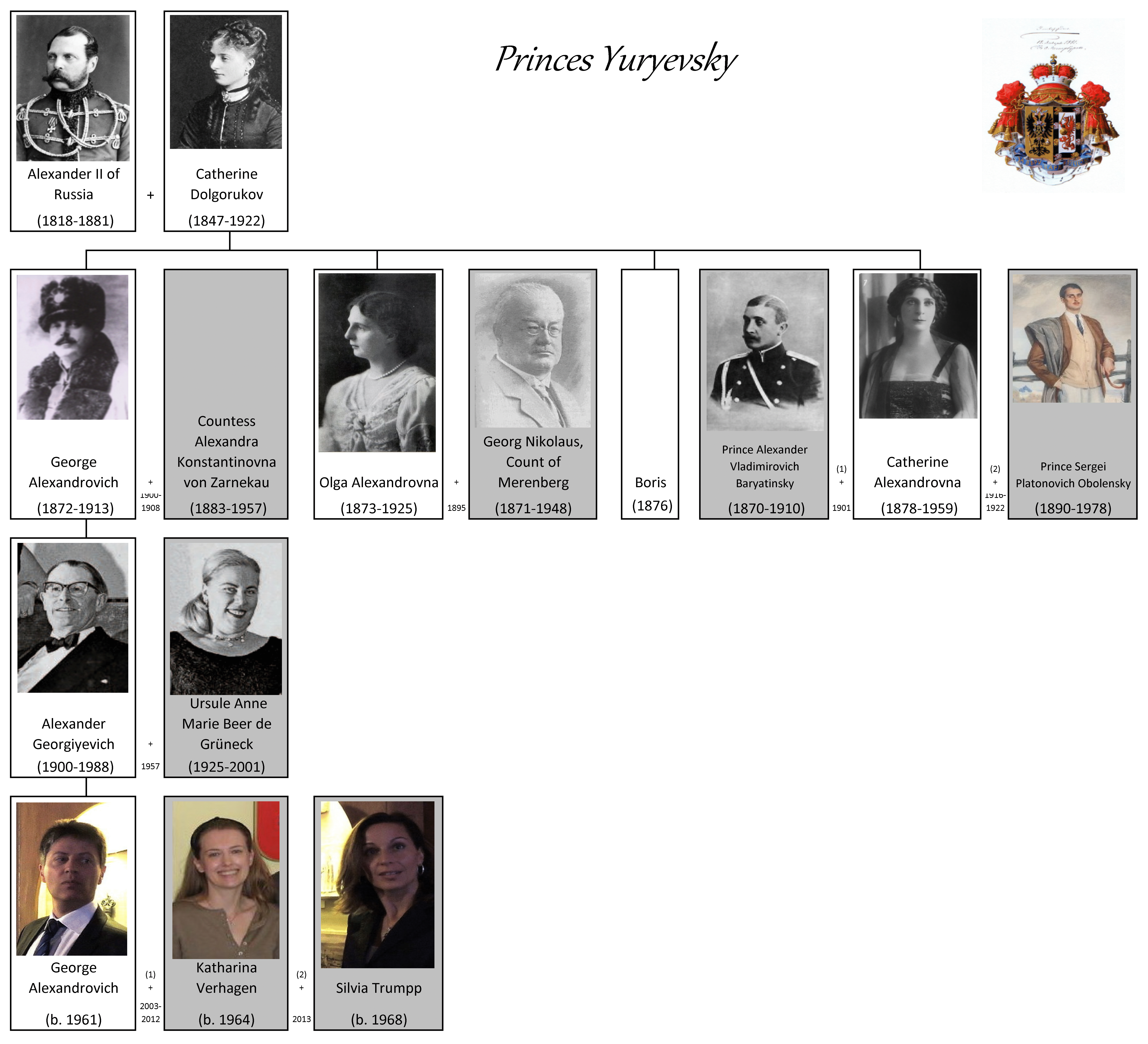
Family tree of princes Yuryevsky (1872–2013)

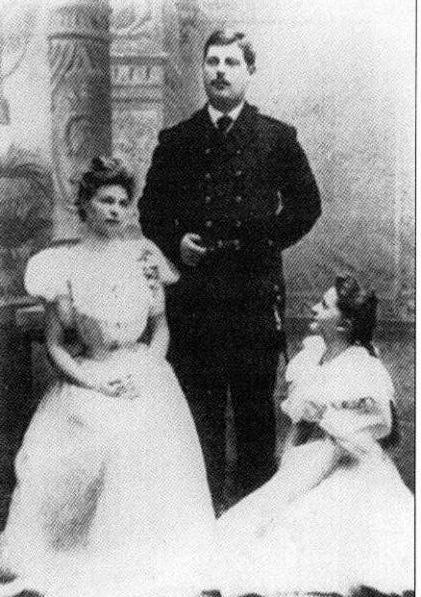
The three surviving children of Catherine and Alexander, pictured as adults

Catherine and Alexander had four children styled as prince or princess (knyaz or knyazhna):

- Prince George Alexandrovich Yurievsky (12 May 1872 – 13 September 1913); married Countess Alexandra von Zarnekau, a morganatic daughter of Duke Constantine Petrovich of Oldenburg and Agripina Japaridze, Countess von Zarnekau. The pair was related, second cousins once removed, as both shared descent of Emperor Paul I of Russia.
- Princess Olga Alexandrovna Yurievskaya (7 November 1873 – 10 August 1925); married Georg Nikolaus, Count of Merenberg, a morganatic son of Prince Nikolaus Wilhelm of Nassau by his wife, Natalia Alexandrovna Pushkina, daughter of poet Alexander Pushkin. The pair was related, third cousins once removed, as both were descendants of Frederick II Eugene, Duke of Württemberg.
- Boris Alexandrovich Yurievsky (23 February 1876 – 11 April 1876).
- Princess Catherine Alexandrovna Yurievskaya (9 September 1878 – 22 December 1959); married, firstly, Prince Alexander Vladimirovich Baryatinsky, to whom she was distantly related. They were seventh cousins, as both descended from Philip, Duke of Schleswig-Holstein-Sonderburg-Glücksburg. She married secondly, Prince Sergei Platonovich Obolensky, to whom she was also distantly related. They were fifth cousins, as they both descended from Prince Alexey Grigoryevich Dolgorukov.

All three of the surviving children left descendants.

== In media ==
A biography of Princess Catherine was written by Princess Marthe Bibesco. This biography was the basis for two films. The English translation by Priscilla Bibesco was published in 1939.

The first film, Katia, released in 1938 and featuring Danielle Darrieux, was directed by Maurice Tourneur, and the identically named Katia, released in 1959 and featuring Romy Schneider, was directed by Robert Siodmak.
