= Prince George Alexandrovich Yuryevsky =

Son of Alexander II of Russia (1872 – 1913)

Prince George Yuryevsky
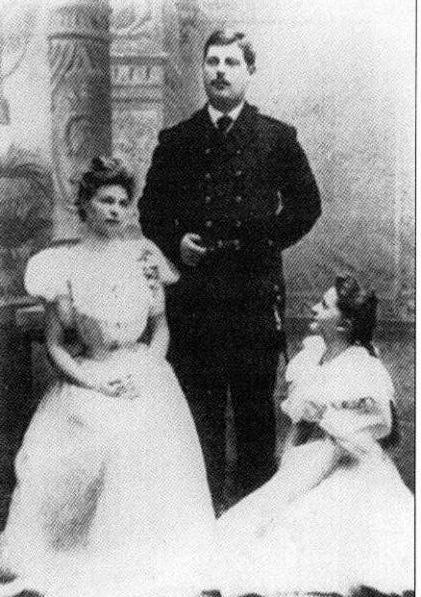
- George with his sisters Olga and Catherine
- Full name: Георгий Александрович Юрьевский
- Born: 12 May 1872; St. Petersburg, Russian Empire
- Died: 13 September 1913 (aged 41); Marburg, Hesse, German Empire
- Buried: St. Elizabeth's Church, Wiesbaden, German Empire
- Noble family: Yuryevsky
- Spouse: Countess Alexandra von Zarnekau (m. 1900; div. 1908)
- Issue: Prince Alexander Georgiyevich Yuryevsky
- Father: Alexander II of Russia
- Mother: Catherine Dolgorukova

Prince George Alexandrovich Yuryevsky (Note: The prince's name varies depending on the source. One refers to him as Prince Georgy Alexandrovich Yuryevsky, Yourievsky, Yurievsky, or Yurivsky, while another refers to him as Prince Georgii. Nicknames included "Gogo", "Goga", and "Georgy".) (Russian: Гео́ргий Алекса́ндрович Ю́рьевский; 12 May 1872 [30 April 1872 O. S.] – 13 September 1913) was the natural son of Alexander II of Russia by his mistress (and later wife), Princess Catherine Dolgorukova. The morganatic marriage of George's parents on 6 July 1880, eight years after his birth, resulted in the legitimation of their three surviving children, and George gained the style of Serene Highness.

== Family and early life ==
George's mother, Catherine Dolgorukova, met Alexander II when he visited the Smolny Institute in the autumn of 1864. She became his mistress in July 1866, despite early resistance. Their affair caused great scandal at court, with Alexander's heir (the Tsarevich) in particular protesting, though it was to be in vain. The Emperor was devoted to Catherine and promised to marry her as soon as he was "free," meaning when his estranged and sickly wife Empress Maria Alexandrovna finally died. George ("Gogo") was the first child of Catherine and Alexander and was born in the Emperor's study on 12 May 1872, in a difficult birth that almost killed his mother. Alexander had ordered that if the circumstances called for it, Catherine, and not the child, must be saved; but mother and son both lived, and the father happily wrote "The Lord is so generous. I praised God, in tears I thank Him". Three more siblings later followed: Olga, Boris, and Catherine. Their births further tied the couple together.

The devotion Alexander showed to his mistress and children concerned all around him, many feeling that the relationship damaged his reputation irreparably. In 1878, Alexander secretly had his children legitimated with noble status under the name of "Yuryevskii," clearly marking his second family as Russian, compared to the German heritage of his other children. When revolutionary groups like the Nihilist movement increased in power, the Emperor's "first family", as well as the princess and their children, removed themselves to the Winter Palace for security reasons, where their rooms were said to be directly above the dying Empress.

=== Legitimation ===
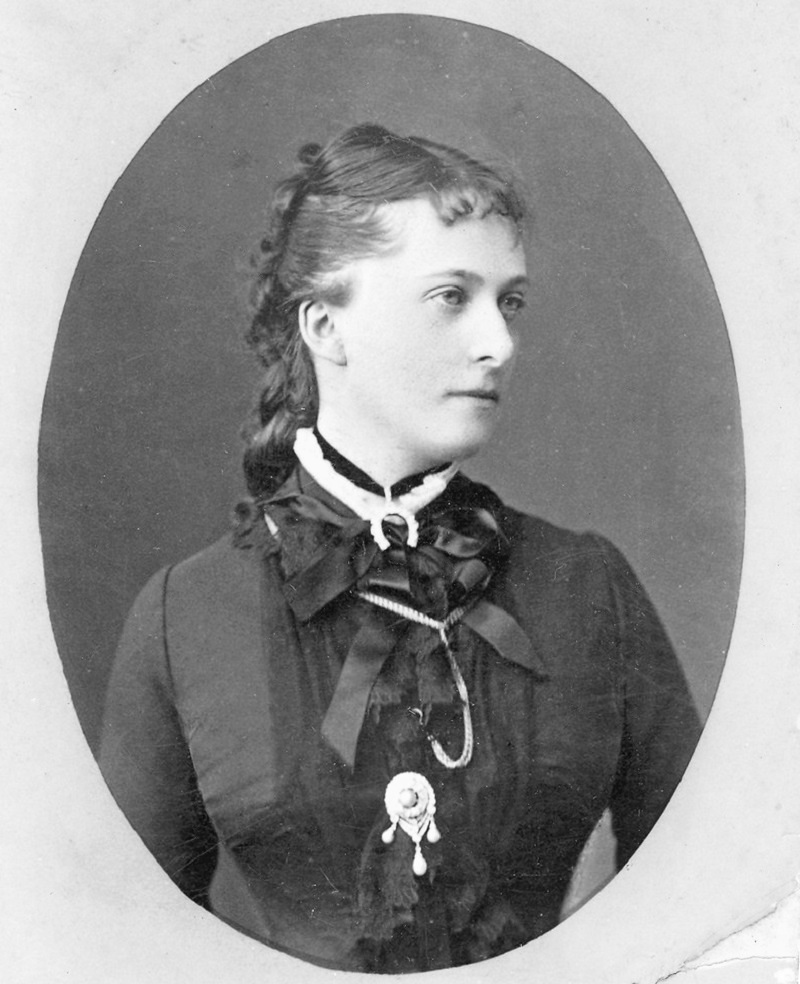
George's mother, Catherine Dolgorukova, by Sergei Lvovich Levitsky and Rafail Sergeevich Levitsky, 1880

The Empress died on 8 June 1880, and her widower promptly married Catherine a month later in a secret, morganatic ceremony in the presence of five witnesses, though none belonged to the Imperial family. The Emperor had believed he was in danger of assassination, and was consequently in favor of a speedy remarriage, as this would help to provide for his second family. The marriage was heavily criticized, with one source speculating that it "deprived [Alexander's] image of both the moral and cultural attributes that had come to justify autocratic power". Catherine took the title Princess Romanovskaia-Yurevskaia and the status of Serene Highness, along with her children. (Note: "To the Government Senate: Having entered a second time into a legal marriage, with Princess Ekaterina Mikhailovna Dolgorukaya, we command her to be named Princess Yuryevskaya with the title Serene Princess. We command that the same name with the same title be given to our children: our son, Georgii, our daughters Olga and Yekaterina, and also to any others that might be born subsequently, and we confer upon them all the rights of legitimate children in accordance with art. 14 of the empire's basic laws and art. 147 of the Statutes on the Imperial Family. Alexander. Tsarskoye Selo, 6 July 1880") (Note: Other sources however attribute George's legitimization to an act conferred later that year, on 5 December.) All the children began using the patronymic Aleksandovich (Aleksandovna for the girls), causing fears that despite the morganatic status of the marriage, the Emperor was contemplating giving them dynastic rights. George's birth had already caused concern among the Imperial family, because he was viewed as a threat to the true heir, who often had strong disagreements with his father. Rumours were constantly circulating that George would be the tsarevich's replacement.

It was well known that Alexander regarded George as a "true Russian", remarking in 1881 of George: "This is a real Russian; in him at least there flows only Russian blood". Furthermore, although the order of the succession had been made clear in a law of 1797, the Emperor still had the power to do as he wished. One incident that caused concern occurred at a family reception, when Alexander playfully asked his son: "Tell us Goga, what is your name?" George replied, "My name is Prince Georgy Alexandrovich Yuryevsky", to which the Emperor declared, "I'm pleased to make your acquaintance, Prince Yuryevsky! And wouldn't you like to become a grand duke, young man?" This conversation was the Emperor's barely concealed attempt to test his relatives' reactions, were he to legally adopt and make his son and daughters a grand duke and grand duchesses. The princess however renounced all succession rights on behalf of her son, who was eight years old at the time. The morganatic nature of the marriage meant that not only did Catherine not automatically become empress, but the children had absolutely no succession rights.

The newly married Princess Yuryevsky and her son made their first official appearance on 4 October during a military review of the Cossacks, with George wearing a Cossack uniform. Alexander begged his heir to accept her into the family, and introduced him to George as his "eldest brother" whom he was "to love and obey" and by whom he would be looked after. The year they married, the Emperor arranged financial security for his second family and asked the Tsarevich to care for them when he died. (Note: In a November 1880 letter to his son, Alexander II wrote "Dear Sasha, In the event of my death I entrust my wife and children to your care... In my wife's lifetime, our children must be only under her guardianship... My wife did not inherit anything from her family. Thus all property that she now owns... has been acquired by her personally, and her family has no rights to this property... This is my last will, and I am certain you will execute it diligently".) Catherine and their children began to appear at official family dinners, where George enjoyed playing with the Tsarevich's children, to the displeasure of the future emperor's wife.

There is evidence that Alexander was preparing to crown his second wife as empress-consort, much as Peter the Great had done with his wife Marta Helena Skowrońska, who became Catherine I. Indeed, the Emperor ordered research be done on the subject in order to evaluate how Catherine's coronation might be achieved. The Tsarevich was so upset by these plans that he threatened to leave for Denmark with his family, but he chose to stay after the Emperor threatened to replace him as heir by his half-brother. Another rumour suggested the Emperor might abdicate, at the urging of his wife, and go to live with her and their children in France.

=== Death of the Emperor ===
Emperor Alexander II died on 13 March 1881, when after visiting his cousin Grand Duchess Catherine Mikhailovna he was assassinated on the road leading back to the Winter Palace. His death stopped all plans for Catherine's coronation, which some considered fortunate, as they feared it would have caused lasting damage to the monarchy. In his Will, Alexander II left his widow the same amount he bequeathed to each of his sons from his first marriage. Despite his earlier opposition, the Emperor's son, now Alexander III, made an official visit of condolence to Catherine and gave her an additional allowance as well as a small palace for her to live in after she left the Winter Palace. George and his family attended the Emperor's funeral, but they were ignored as much as possible by the Imperial family, until Alexander III himself approached his father's widow and spoke to her. His wife, Empress Maria Feodorovna was nearby, but as she had been greatly opposed to the princess, she hesitated to acknowledge her. After being embraced by Catherine, however, they both broke down crying, and George and his sisters kissed Maria's hand. The couple left, and the widow and children went to another private chapel for a separate mass, as she was not to be allowed to mingle with the Imperial family in the more public funeral planned for later.

Alexander's widow later published her memoirs, Alexander II: Unedited Details of his Private Life, and Concerning his Death, in which she claimed that as the Emperor's favorite child, George was the "child of his private home and life, finding in him the child of the Russian nation to which he had given so much affection".

== Later years ==
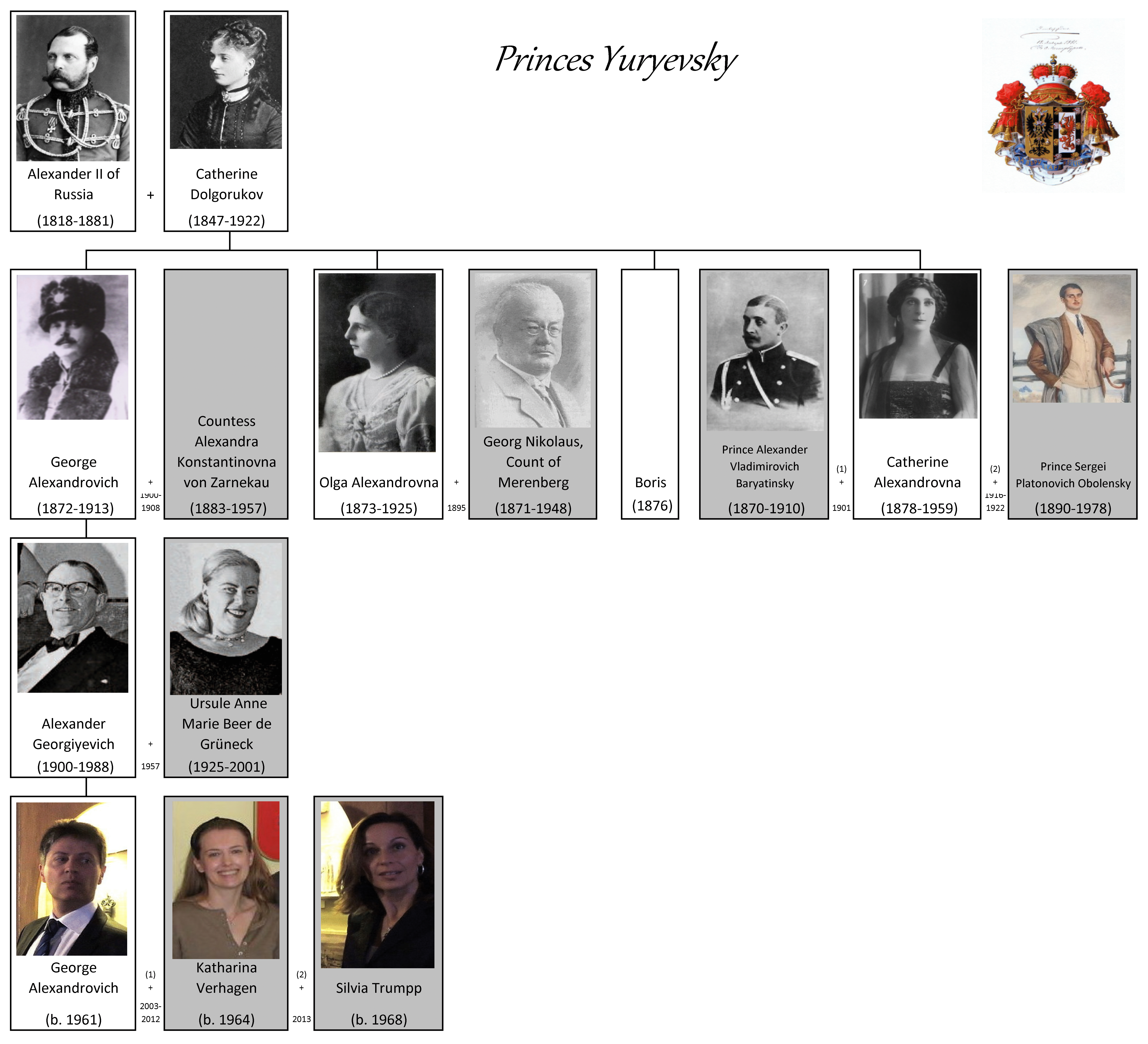
Family tree

After his father's assassination, George, along with his mother and sisters Olga and Catherine (brother Boris died the year he was born), went to live in Paris and Nice, France. He was educated at the Lycée Condorcet and graduated from the University of Paris, Sorbonne, in 1891 with a bachelor's degree. Though his mother secured a considerable amount of money from her husband, little was left in their children's names; as a result, she was in full control of the family fortune, and treated her children parsimoniously.

George's half-brother, Alexander III, would not let him join the Imperial Russian Army or live in Russia, but Alexander grudgingly allowed him to join the Imperial Russian Navy as a midshipman if served in foreign waters.

In 1893, George's half-brother Grand Duke Alexei Alexandrovich of Russia allowed him to join the navy despite his lack of qualifications. George borrowed money from the other officers so that he could throw gold coins at girls during carnival season, and he did not pay back his debts. He failed his examinations, and Alexei privately told the naval authorities to "examine him until he passes." He took an unofficial leave of absence without Alexei's approval, and Alexei gave up on him.

In a 24 December 1893 letter, Alexei complained to Princess Yurievskaya about George's behavior in the navy:

Dear Princess, as I have already cabled you, I granted leave to Gogo [George], but only for your sake. He himself, of course, has not earned it, and unfortunately I must again repeat that I am extremely dissatisfied with his services. Both when on duty and on board during cruises he simply does not want to do anything at all; neither advice, nor the example of others have any effect whatever on him. Laziness, untidiness, and total lack of self esteem make him the laughing stock of his comrades and draw upon him the dissatisfaction of his superiors, who do not know what to do with him. Today I gave him a severe reprimand, and have ordered his superior, that is the Commander of the Ship, to punish him severely for every misdemeanor! Perhaps that will have some effect. I am writing you all this, because I am afraid that Gogo will hide the truth from you, all the more as he is past-master at inventing excuses and talking himself out of trouble. It seems to me he would do better to transfer to land service, for he will never make a good sailor! It is very unpleasant for me to have to write you all this, but what can I do. I send you my best wishes for the New Year, and trust that you and the children are well.

Heartily yours,
Alexis

Nicholas II, the new emperor, was more kindly disposed to George, and allowed the prince to move back to Russia, where he transferred from the navy to serve a commission of lieutenant in the regiment of the Hussars of the Guard. He retired after a few years with the rank of captain, upon his marriage. George became a prominent figure in St. Petersburg society and at the Imperial court.

=== Marriage and death ===
In 1901, George was described as a "tall and rather stout man of thirty", who partly resembled his father in his looks and bearing. On 16 February 1900 in Nice, he married Countess Aleksandra Konstantinovna von Zarnekau, described by some as "a very beautiful woman". Her birth was similar to his own, as she was the daughter of Duke Constantine Petrovich of Oldenburg and his morganatic marriage with Georgian aristocrat Agrippina Japaridze, from the Japaridze family, titled Countess von Zarnekau. The only member of the Russian Imperial family to attend was Grand Duke Michael Mikhailovich, himself banished due to his morganatic marriage to Countess Sophie of Merenberg, the sister-in-law of George's sister, Olga. Emperor Nicholas II disapproved of the union because he disliked Aleksandra's parents, and consequently the couple abandoned their St. Petersburg residence and went to live abroad.

After their marriage, the couple planned to reside in a St. Petersburg palace that had been built by Grand Duke Konstantin Nikolayevich and purchased by his brother Alexander II for his morganatic wife; Catherine in turn passed it down to their son. George and Aleksandra had one son:

- Alexander Georgiyevich Yuryevsky, Prince Yuryevsky (21 December 1900 – 29 February 1988); he married Ursule Anne Marie Beer de Grüneck and had a son named Hans-George (b. 1961), who married Katharina Verhagen (2003-2012) and then Silvia Trumpp (2013).

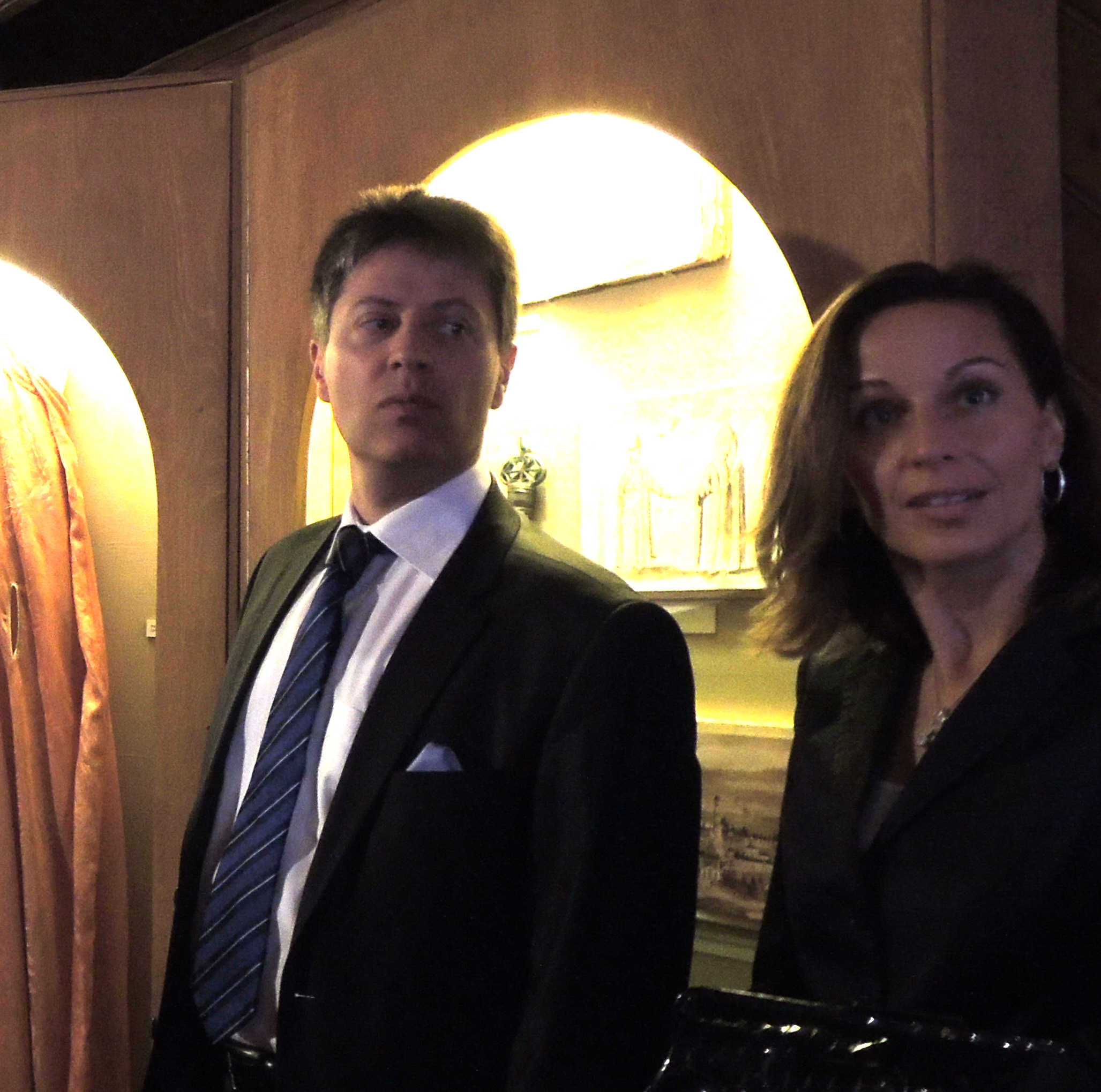
George's grandson, Prince Hans-George Yuryevsky, with his second wife, Silvia Trumpp

The couple became unhappy, and Aleksandra secured a dissolution on the grounds of "neglect and ill treatment by her husband", and she subsequently divorced him in 1909. Financial troubles were another explanation attributed to their divorce. Aleksandra remarried quickly.

After a long and incurable illness, Prince George died on 13 September 1913 in a private hospital in Marburg, Hesse. He was buried at St. Elizabeth's Church in Wiesbaden, Hesse.

== See also ==
- Branches of the Russian Imperial Family
- Yuryevsky

== Ancestry ==
Ancestors of Prince George Alexandrovich Yuryevsky

8. Paul I of Russia
4. Nicholas I of Russia
9. Duchess Sophie Dorothea of Württemburg
2. Alexander II of Russia
10. Frederick William III of Prussia
5. Princess Charlotte of Prussia
11. Duchess Louise of Mecklenburg-Strelitz
1. Prince George Alexandrovich Yuryevsky
12. Prince Michael Mikhailovich Dolgorukov
6. Prince Michael Mikhailovich Dolgorukov
13. Sofia Ossifovna Deribas
3. Princess Catherine Mikhailovna Dolgorukova
14. Gabriel Fedorovich Vishnevsky
7. Vera Gavrilovna Vishnevskaya
15. Sofia Mikhailovna Yeropkina
