= Princess Catherine Yurievskaya =

Russian princess and author (1878–1959)

- Princess Alexander Vladimirovich Baryatinsky; Princess Sergei Obolensky
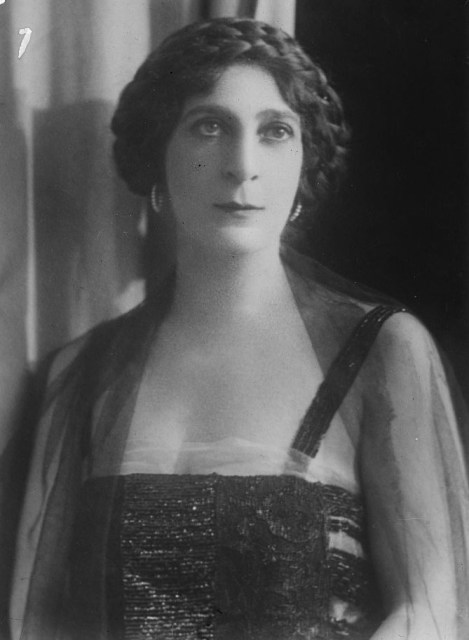
- Yuryevskaya, during her singing career
- Full name: Russian: Екатерина Александровна Юрьевская
- Born: 9 September 1878; St. Petersburg, Russian Empire
- Died: 22 December 1959 (aged 81); Hayling Island, England
- Buried: St Peter's Church, Hayling Island
- Noble family: Yuryevsky (by birth); Baryatinsky (by marriage); Obolensky (by marriage)
- Spouses: Prince Alexander Baryatinsky (m. 1901; died 1910) Prince Sergei Obolensky (m. 1916; div. 1923)
- Issue: Prince Andrei Baryatinsky; Prince Alexander Baryatinsky
- Father: Alexander II of Russia
- Mother: Catherine Dolgorukova

Princess Catherine Alexandrovna Yurievskaya (Russian: Екатери́на Алекса́ндровна Ю́рьевская, romanized: Yekaterina Aleksandrovna Yuryevskaya; 21 September [O.S. 9 September] 1878 – 22 December 1959) was the natural daughter of Alexander II of Russia by his mistress (later his wife), Princess Catherine Dolgorukova. In 1880, she was legitimated by her parents' morganatic marriage. In her own family, she was known as Katia.

After her father's assassination in 1881, her mother brought her up in France. She was married there in 1901, having two sons, but was widowed in 1910. Her second marriage came during the First World War in Russia, and she suffered hardships during the ensuing Russian Civil War. In the 1920s, she became a professional singer. In 1932, she moved to the United Kingdom where she settled on Hayling Island in Hampshire, where she died in 1959.

== Early life ==
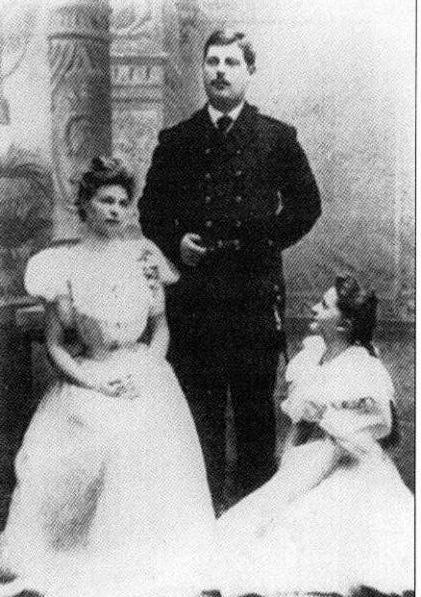
Catherine with her brother Prince George and sister Olga

Catherine was born at Saint Petersburg, Russia, on 9 September 1878, while her mother was still the mistress of Tsar Alexander II. When she was less than two, her parents' morganatic marriage on 6 July 1880 legitimated her, and she acquired the surname of Yurievsky, the title of knyagina (princess) and the style of Svetlost (Serene Highness).

Her father was assassinated in March 1881, when she was three, and she lived thereafter with her mother, brother George, and sister Olga, who settled together in France.

== France and Russia ==
Catherine's mother took a house in Paris and others on the French Riviera. In 1891, she bought a house in Nice which she called the Villa Georges, in the boulevard Dubouchage. In France the family was able to afford some twenty servants and a private railway carriage.

On 18 October 1901, Catherine married at Biarritz Prince Alexander Vladimirovich Baryatinsky (1870–1910). They had two sons, Andrei (born in Paris on 2 August 1902, died 1931) and Alexander (born at Pau, in the Pyrénées-Atlantiques, on 24 March 1905 died 1992). They lived at number 6, Place des États-Unis. Baryatinski died in Florence in 1910, at the age of thirty-nine.

Catherine's brother George died, after a long illness, on 13 September 1913 in Marburg, Hesse, and was buried at St Elizabeth's, Wiesbaden.

On 6 October 1916, at Yalta, Catherine married secondly Prince Sergei Platonovich Obolensky (1890–1978), son of General Prince Platon Sergeievich Obolensky. At the time of the Revolution of 1917, she was still in Russia, and it was later reported that she had "walked for miles without food during the Revolution, suffering great hardship". Her new husband, Obolensky, fought in the White Army during the Russian Civil War.

Catherine's mother died in 1922, leaving only her house in Nice, the Villa Georges. The family's other houses, in Paris, Neuilly, and Biarritz had been sold at a loss over the years. The same year, Obolensky left Catherine for Alice Astor, the daughter of John Jacob Astor IV. After divorcing him in 1923, Catherine became a professional singer, with a repertoire of some two hundred songs in English, French, Russian and Italian. Her autobiography, My book: some pages from my life, was published in London in 1924.

== England ==
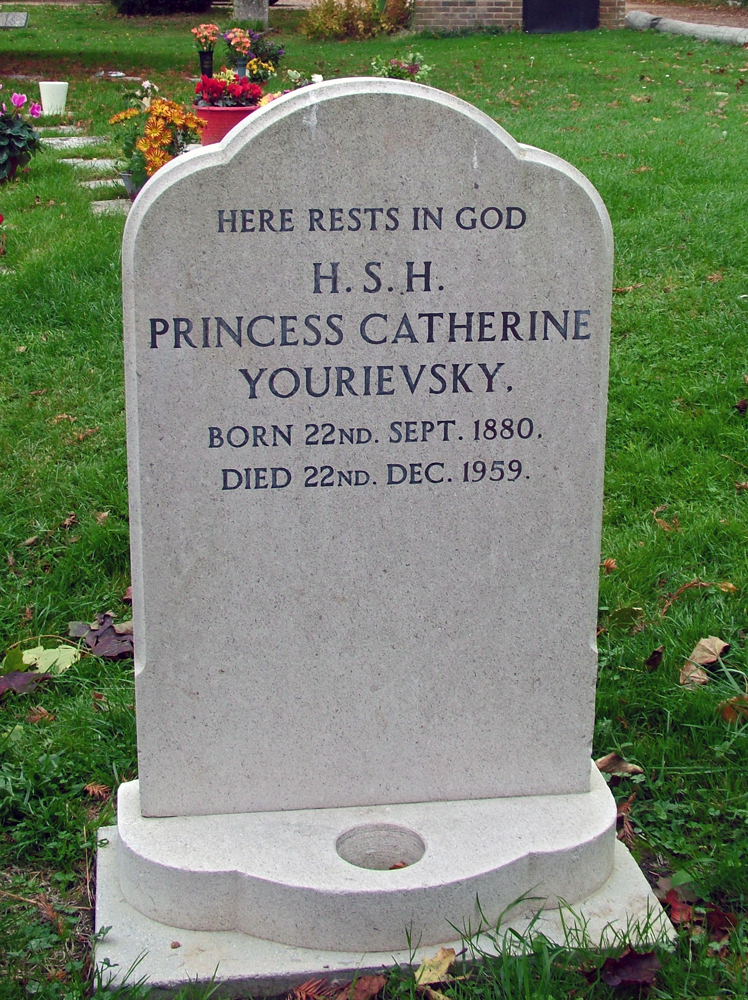
Catherine's grave in the churchyard of St Peter's, Hayling Island, with new gravestone (2018), giving a New Style date of birth

In 1932, Catherine bought a house called "The Haven" on Hayling Island, Hampshire, which she chose for its climate, as she suffered from asthma. On 29 November 1934, she attended the wedding at Westminster Abbey of her grand-niece Princess Marina of Greece and Denmark to Prince George, Duke of Kent.

On 24 August 1935, Henry Channon and his wife called to see Catherine on Hayling Island, but found her out. He noted in his diary that she was living in "a ghastly villa called the Haven in Sinah Lane; there is the sea not far away, peace, poverty, and a Pekinese! All that remains to her of her Romanov grandeur."

For many years, Catherine was supported by an allowance from Queen Mary, the widow of King George V, but after the Queen's death in March 1953 she was left almost penniless and began selling her possessions.

She went to live in a nursing home on Hayling Island and died there on 22 December 1959. She was the last surviving child of Alexander II as well as the last grandchild of Nicholas I. She was buried on 29 December in the churchyard of St Peter's, Northney, with an Anglican funeral. Only two members of the family attended her funeral, her former husband Serge Obolensky and her nephew, Prince Alexander Yurievsky (1901–1988), the son of her brother George. She was also survived by her son Alexander (who died in Grants Pass, Oregon in 1992) and by her granddaughter Elena Bariatinsky (1927–1988), who had been married a few months before her grandmother's death and was in France.

In 1961, a woman in Bramley, Yorkshire, named Olga Marie, claimed to be Catherine's natural daughter, but no more is known of her. In 2016, the local Orthodox community held a panikhida memorial service at her grave after her headstone was restored.
