= Place des États-Unis =

Square in Paris, France

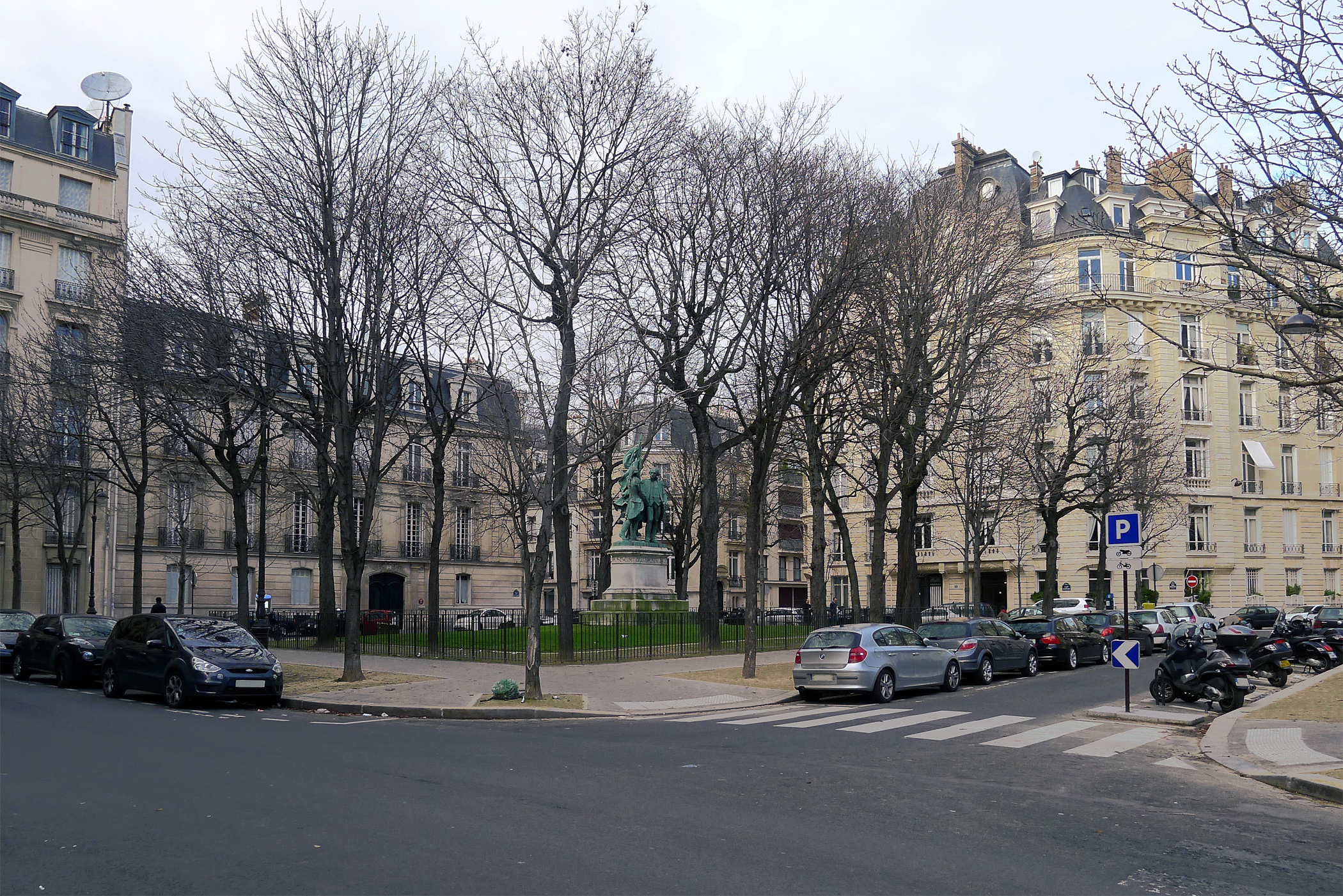
- Place des États-Unis in winter

- Location within Paris
- Length: 200 m (660 ft)
- Width: 60 m (200 ft)
- Arrondissement: 16th
- Quarter: Chaillot
- Coordinates: 48.868007°N 2.294083°E
- From: Avenue d'Iéna
- To: Rue Dumont-d'Urville

Construction
- Completion: 1866
- Denomination: 16 August 1881

The Place des États-Unis (French: [plas dez‿e.taz‿y.ni]; "United States Square") is a public space in the 16th arrondissement of Paris, France, about 500 m (1,600 ft) south of the Place de l'Étoile and the Arc de Triomphe.

It consists of a plaza, approximately 140 m (460 ft) long and 30 m (98 ft) wide, tree-lined, well-landscaped, and circumscribed by streets, forming a pleasant and shady vest-pocket park. The park is officially named the Square Thomas Jefferson, but buildings facing it (on three sides) have Place-des-États-Unis addresses. The eastern end of the square, however, is capped by the Avenue d'Iéna and a confluence of streets known as the Place de l'Amiral de Grasse. These streets, all of which lead to the eastern end of Place des États-Unis, are the Rue Freycinet, Rue de Lübeck, Rue de Bassano, and the Rue Georges Bizet.

Other streets entering the Place des États-Unis include: the Rue de l'Amiral d'Estaing, which enters from the south; the Rue Galilée, which transits the western end of the Square Thomas Jefferson; and the Rue Dumont d'Urville which enters the northwestern corner.

== History ==
=== Name origin ===
The area around the Place des États-Unis was created by the destruction of the old Passy water reservoirs. (They were reconstructed in 1866 on higher ground, in the triangle formed by three streets: Lauriston, Paul Valéry, and Copernic, about two hundred metres to the west-northwest.)

The Place des États-Unis was originally called the Place de Bitche to honor a town in the Moselle department in northeastern France that resisted the Prussian invasion during the Franco-Prussian War of 1870. However, the square's name was changed after Levi P. Morton, the American ambassador to France, established his residence and his country's embassy there in 1881 after abandoning unsuitable offices a few blocks away at 95, Rue de Chaillot. The similarity between the name of the Moselle city, Bitche, and the English insult bitch made the Americans uncomfortable, so the chargé d'affaires ordered the préfet for the Seine department to change the name. The French official arranged for the name Place de Bitche to be transferred to another site in the 19th arrondissement, near the Pont de Crimée, and renamed the square outside the ambassador's legation as the Place des États-Unis.

=== The Statue of Liberty (model) ===
On 13 May 1885, a bronze model of the Statue of Liberty (Liberty Enlightening the World) by Frédéric Bartholdi was erected in the center of the Place des États-Unis, directly in front of the American diplomatic mission. Purchased by the Committee of Americans in Paris and offered to the City of Paris, the model was a fund-raising tool, displayed with the aim of inspiring support for the building of the full-sized statue and its transport across the Atlantic. The model remained in place until 1888.

=== Statue of Washington and Lafayette ===
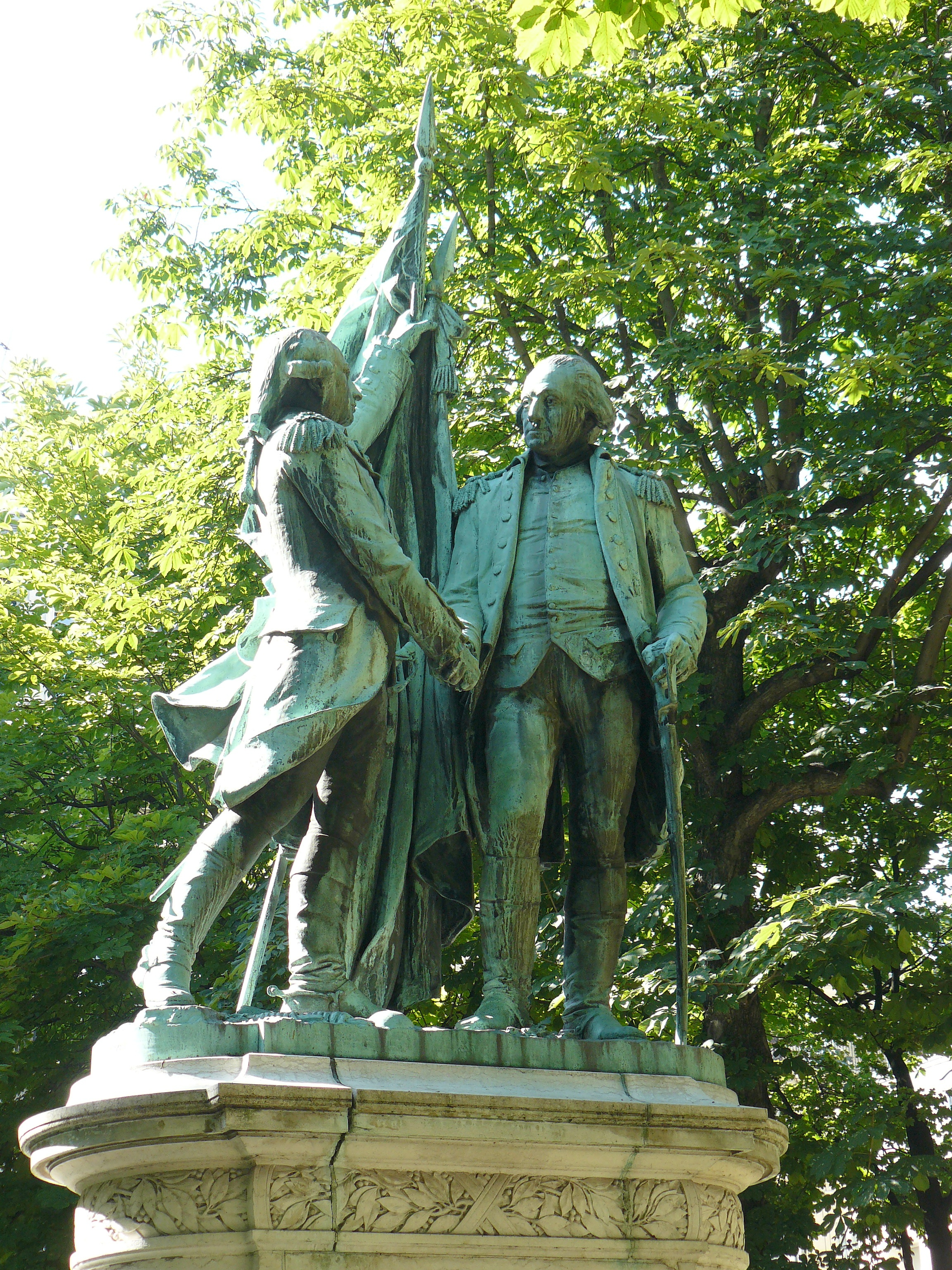
Statue of Lafayette and Washington by Frédéric Bartholdi (1890)

Famed publisher Joseph Pulitzer (1847–1911), impressed by the work Bartholdi had done in executing the Statue of Liberty, commissioned him to produce another statue, one emblematic of the French-American friendship. The subject matter, General George Washington and Gilbert du Motier, Marquis de Lafayette, comrades-in-arms during the American Revolutionary War, was an easy choice. The sculptor designed the bronze statue, which depicts Washington and Lafayette on a marble plinth, clothed in military uniforms, shaking hands; the French and American flags serve as a backdrop. Dedicated in 1895, the statue was installed in the Place des États-Unis. A few years later, Charles Broadway Rouss, the New York City department-store tycoon, purchased an exact replica of the Washington-and-Lafayette statue which he donated to the people of New York City for placement in Morningside Park in the Morningside Heights neighborhood of Manhattan.

=== Monument to Horace Wells ===
The Place des États-Unis (Square Thomas Jefferson) is the site of a monument to the American dentist, Horace Wells (1815–1848), who was a pioneer in the use of anesthesia. The monument was dedicated on 27 March 1910 during the tenth session of the FDI World Dental Federation, which was then known as the Fédération dentaire internationale. On the right side of the base of the monument, the sculptor, René Bertrand-Boutée, incised the medallion of the physiologist, Paul Bert, who was also an early experimenter in anaesthetics, respiration, and asphyxia.

=== Memorial to the American volunteers ===
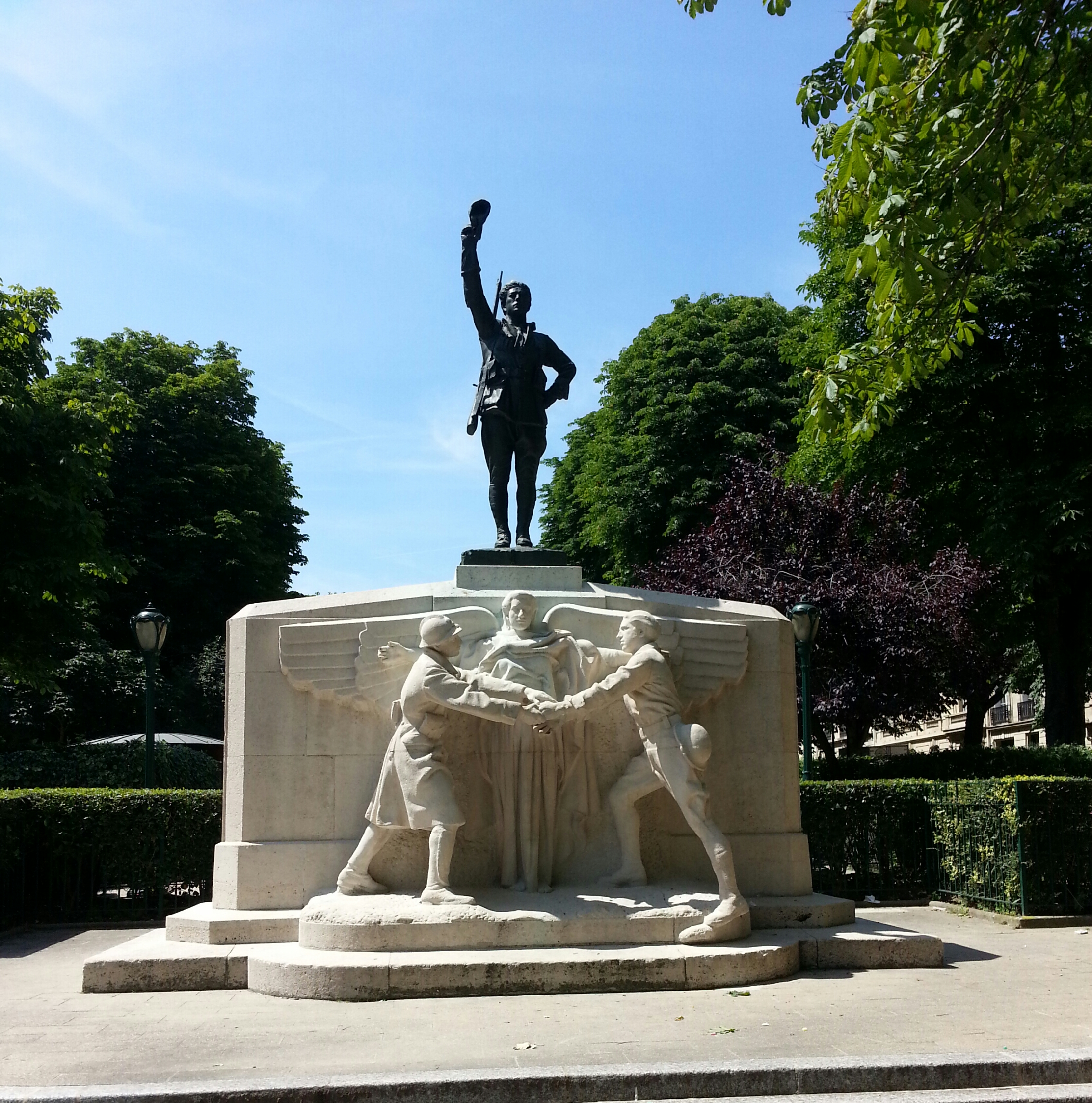
Memorial to American Volunteers by Jean Boucher (1923)

On 4 July 1923, the President of the French Council of State, Raymond Poincaré, dedicated a monument in the Place des États-Unis to the Americans who had volunteered to fight in World War I in the service of France. The monument, in the form of a bronze statue on a plinth, executed by Jean Boucher (1870–1939), had been financed through a public subscription. Boucher had used a photograph of the soldier and poet, Alan Seeger, as his inspiration, and Seeger's name can be found, among those of twenty-three others who had fallen in the ranks of the French Foreign Legion, on the back of the plinth. Also, on either side of the base of the statue, are two excerpts from Seeger's "Ode in Memory of the American Volunteers Fallen for France", a poem written shortly before his death on 4 July 1916. Seeger intended that his words should be read in Paris on 30 May of that year, at an observance of the American holiday, Decoration Day (later known as Memorial Day):

Yet sought they neither recompense nor praise,
Nor to be mentioned in another breath,
Than their blue coated comrades whose great days
It was their pride to share—ay, share even to the death!

[...]

Hail, brothers, and farewell; you are twice blest, brave hearts.
Double your glory is who perished thus,
For you have died for France and vindicated us.

== Notable buildings in the Place des États-Unis ==
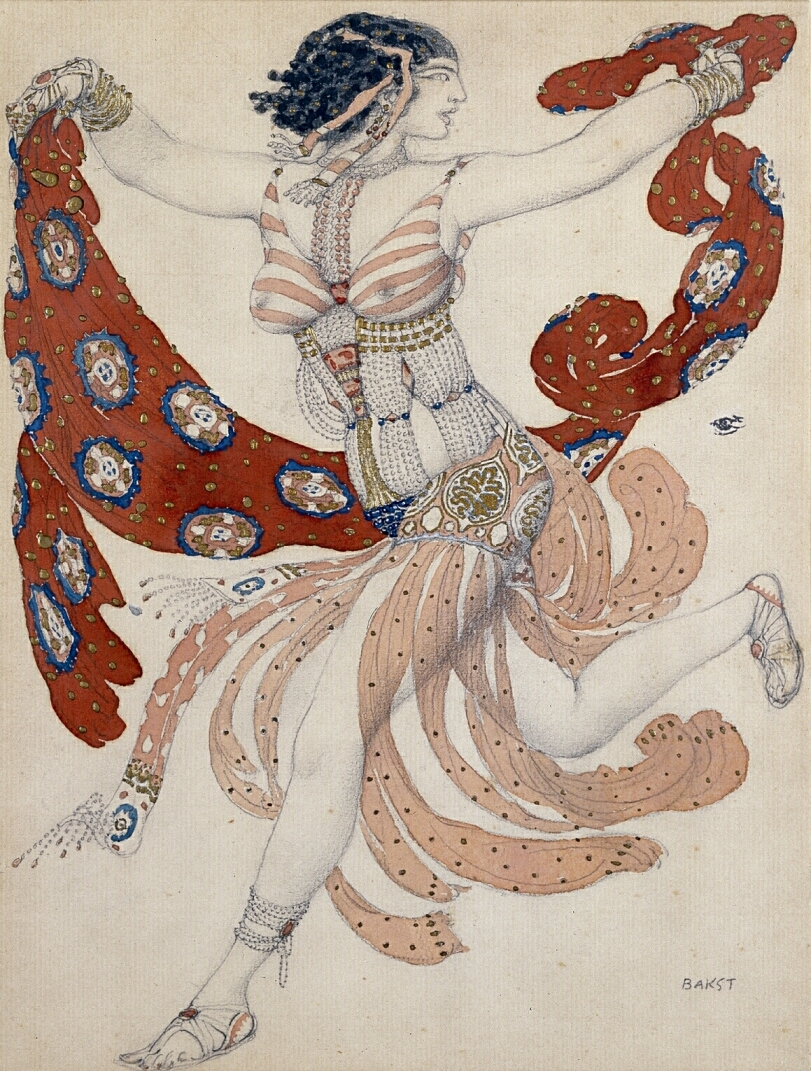
Cleopatra costume created for Ida Rubinstein by Léon Bakst in 1909

- No. 1, Place des États-Unis: the embassy of Kuwait. Originally the townhouse of the Countess Roza Branicka (1863–1941), this place was also a gathering-place for Polish immigrants at the beginning of the twentieth century.
- No. 2: The Ephrussi Mansion. Constructed in 1886 by Ernest Sanson for the banker, Jules Ephrussi (1846–1915). In 1922, it was acquired by the Egyptian king, Fuad I, whose eventual fall from power prompted the successor government, the Republic of Egypt, to seize it for use as the residence of its ambassador to France.
- No. 3: Here, the American ambassador, Levi Morton, established his residence and, for a brief period, the offices of the entire American legation. The American novelist, Edith Wharton, also lived here for a time.
- No. 3B: Embassy of Bahrain. This small brick-and-stone building was built for Olga von Meyendorff (1838–1926) before becoming the home of the painter, Théobald Chartran, and his wife, Sylvie. The Chartrans' place was the haunt of artists, writers, and politicians.
- No. 4: The Deutsch de la Meurthe Mansion. Originally constructed for the industrialist and aviation pioneer, Henry Deutsch de la Meurthe (1846–1919), this building was, during World War II, occupied by the Gestapo. Beginning in the late 1940s, it was the residence of Francine Worms-Weisweiller (1916–2003), a descendant of the Deutsch de la Meurthe family, who was the patron of Jean Cocteau, and her husband, the American financier, Alec Weisweiller.
- No. 6: Former home of Prince Alexander Bariatinsky (1870–1910) and of his wife Catherine Alexandrovna Yurievskaya (1878–1959), a daughter of Czar Alexander II of Russia. Today, it is a showroom for the wares of the crystal-maker, Arc International, formerly known as Cristallerie d'Arques
- No. 7: A building constructed on the site of the townhouse Ida Rubinstein, the dancer and patron of the arts, moved into in 1921. Nothing is left of her home, which was designed and decorated by the great Léon Bakst. The Nazis seized her valuables during their World War II occupation of Paris. Whether the house was razed as an act of wanton destruction or whether it came down under other circumstances is unclear; sources vary.
- No. 8: This attractive private house belonged, at the beginning of the twentieth century, to M. Saint-Paul, an influential counselor of state. Then it housed the renowned literary salon of the poet, Edmée de La Rochefoucauld (1895–1991), a cultivated environment often referred to as the waiting room for the prestigious French Academy.
- No. 10: The De Brantes Building, presently occupied by lawyers' offices.
- No. 11: The Bischoffsheim Building, also called the De Noailles Building, was constructed in 1895 by Ernest Sanson for the financier, Raphaël-Louis Bischoffsheim (1823–1906), and subsequently occupied by his granddaughter, the Viscountess Marie-Laure de Noailles, who provided there a haven for artists and writers. Madame de Noailles supported successful artists Jean Cocteau, Luis Buñuel, and Man Ray. She lived at the Place des États-Unis from age eighteen until her death in 1970. During her tenure there, she was renowned for throwing exquisite parties and cultural soirees where the guest list often included the likes of Pablo Picasso, Alberto Giacometti, Picabia, Balthus, Henri Matisse, and Salvador Dalí. Between March 14 and June 28, 1919, the American President Woodrow Wilson lived in the house during his second residence in Paris for the work of the Paris Peace Conference, 1919. The house later belonged to the Syrian-born Saudi arms dealer, Akram Ojjeh, then to his widow, Nahed, who sold it to the crystal-maker, Baccarat. This firm renovated the building with the help of the designer, Philippe Starck, in order to open a luxurious showroom there, a facility it calls "a museum of crystal", and a restaurant named the Crystal Room.
- No. 12: This building, once a vast private house, is now the headquarters of the international liquor company, Pernod-Ricard.
- No. 14: A building constructed in 1910 on the site of the townhouse of the duc d'Isly (duke of Isly).
- No. 16: Hôtel de Yturbe. Having served as the American embassy, this structure became the property of Francisco-María de Yturbe y Anciola, the former Finance Minister of Mexico, who spent the last years of his life living there. It then passed to his oldest son, Francisco-Tirso de Yturbe, another Mexican diplomat posted to Paris, then to his second son, Miguel de Yturbe, also a diplomat. Miguel de Yturbe married María Teresa Limantour, daughter of José Yves Limantour, who was also Finance Minister of Mexico for eighteen years under President Porfirio Díaz.
- No. 17: Presently the headquarters of the Association of Regional Daily Newspapers (Syndicat de la presse quotidienne régionale, or SPQR), the building was occupied by Count Charles Cahen d'Anvers and his wife, the countess. Cahen d'Anvers was the man who, in 1935, donated the château at Champs-sur-Marne to the French state. The Lebanese businessman, Samir Traboulsi, lived here at the time of the Pechiney-Triangle political corruption scandal involving the French firm, Pechiney, and the American aluminum can company, Triangle.
- No. 18: A building at the western end of the Square Thomas Jefferson, constructed by the architect, Pierre Humbert (b. 1848), for the young and wealthy Mademoiselle Mathilde de Montesquiou-Fézensac (1884–1960), who, much later, in 1920, married the musician and composer, Charles-Marie Widor (1844–1937), when she was 36 years old and he was 76.
