= Yuri's Day =

Yuri's Day may refer to:

- Yuri's Day in Autumn or George's Day in Autumn, a Slavic religious holiday
- Yuri's Day in Spring or Đurđevdan, a Slavic religious holiday
- Yuri's Day (film), a 2008 Russian drama film

== See also ==
- Saint George's Day
- Yuri's Night
