= St. Elizabeth's Church, Wiesbaden =

Russian Orthodox church

Coordinates: 50°05′51″N 8°14′05″E

- St. Elizabeth's Church, Wiesbaden

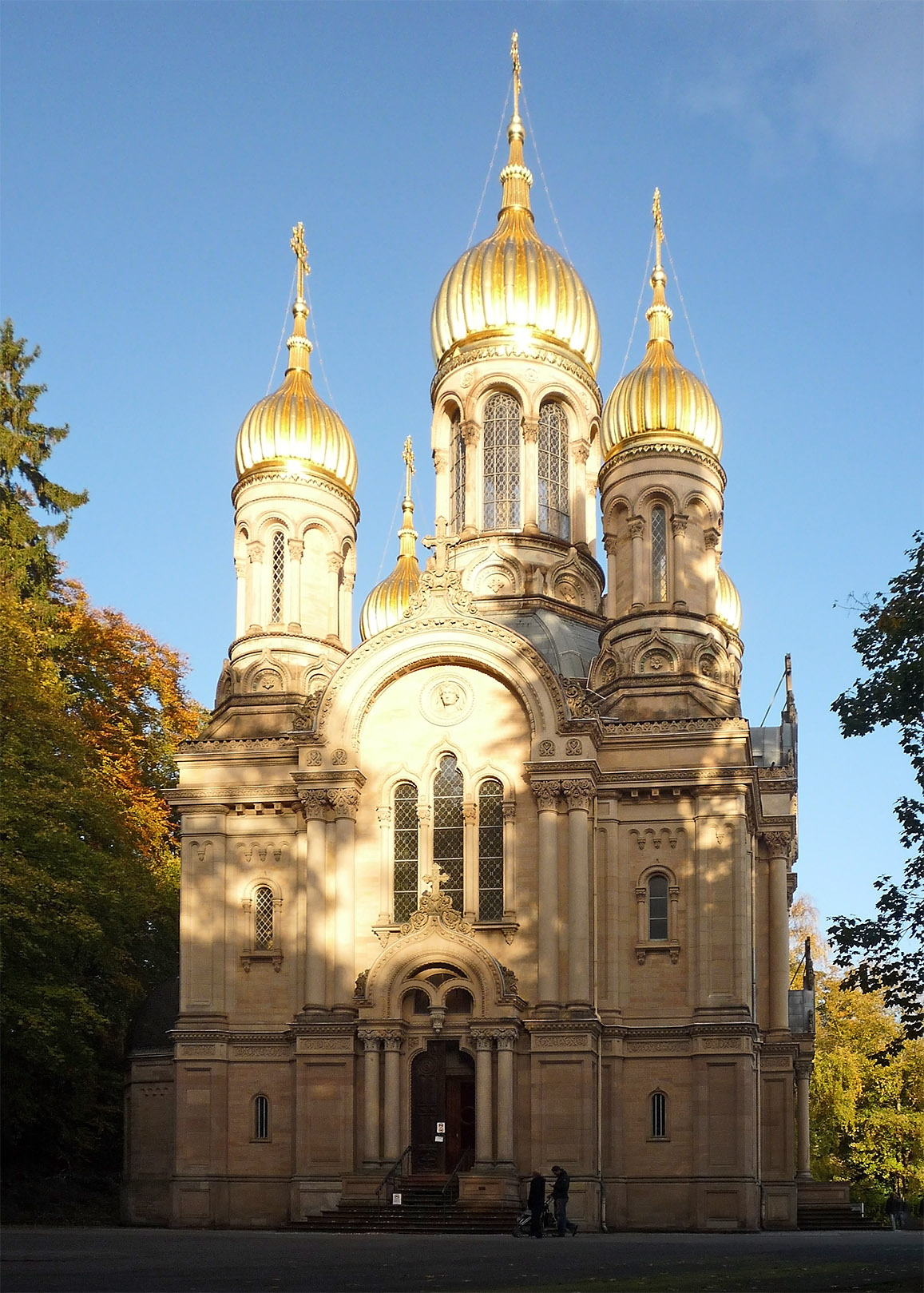
The Russian Orthodox church on Neroberg with its five golden domes (2010)

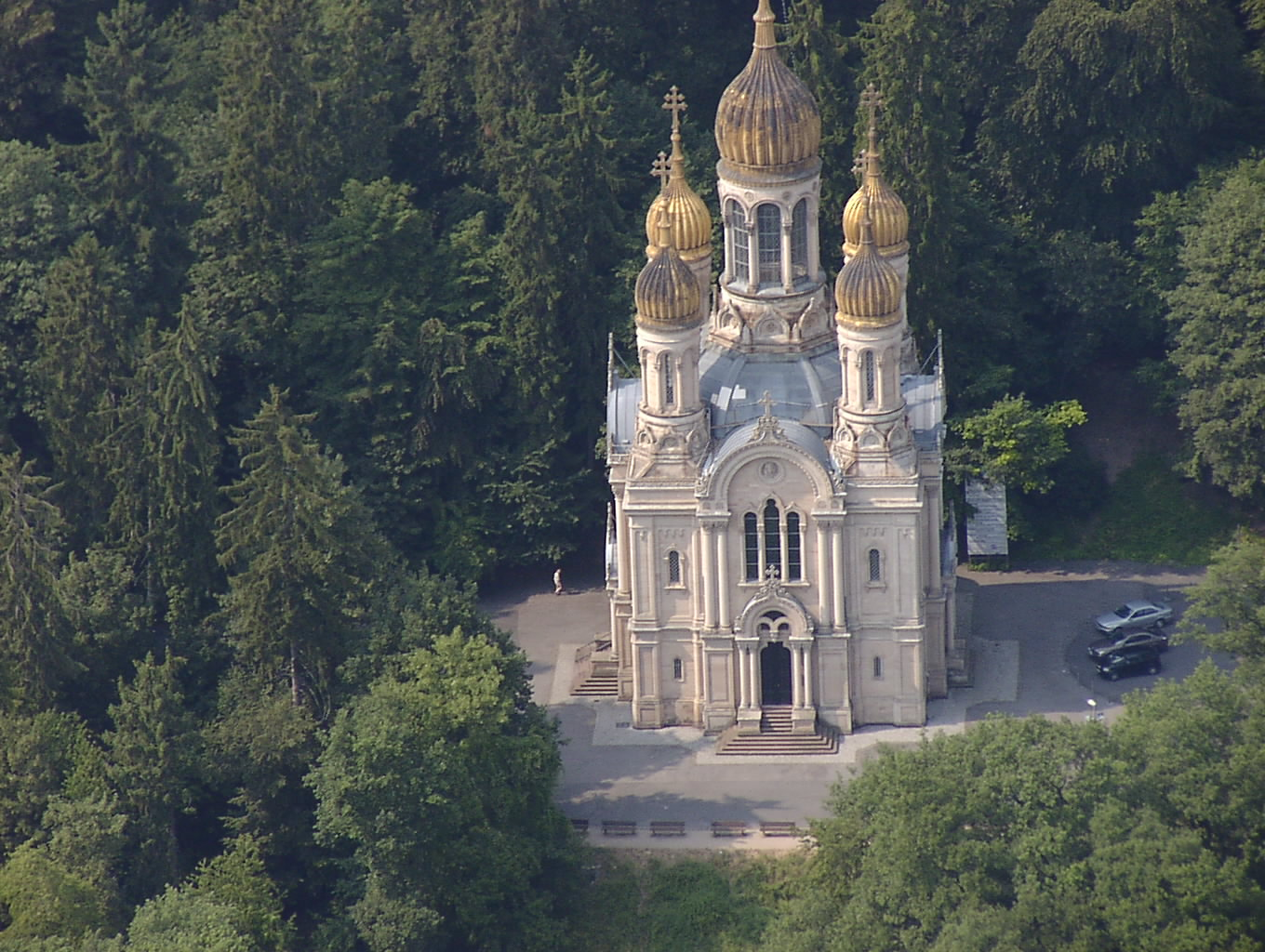
Aerial view of the church seen from the south (2006)

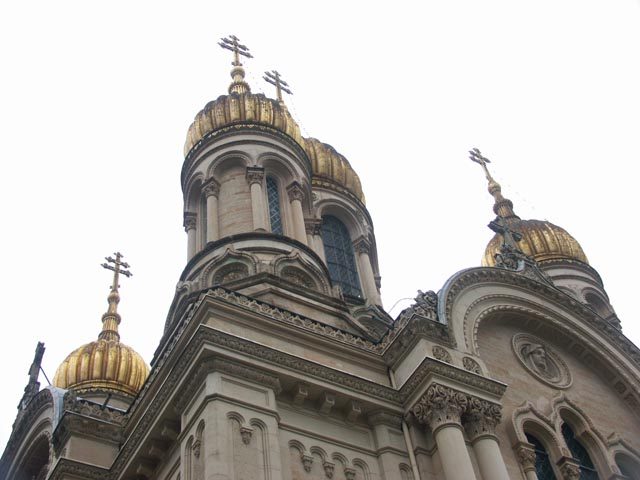
The gilt onion domes of the towers

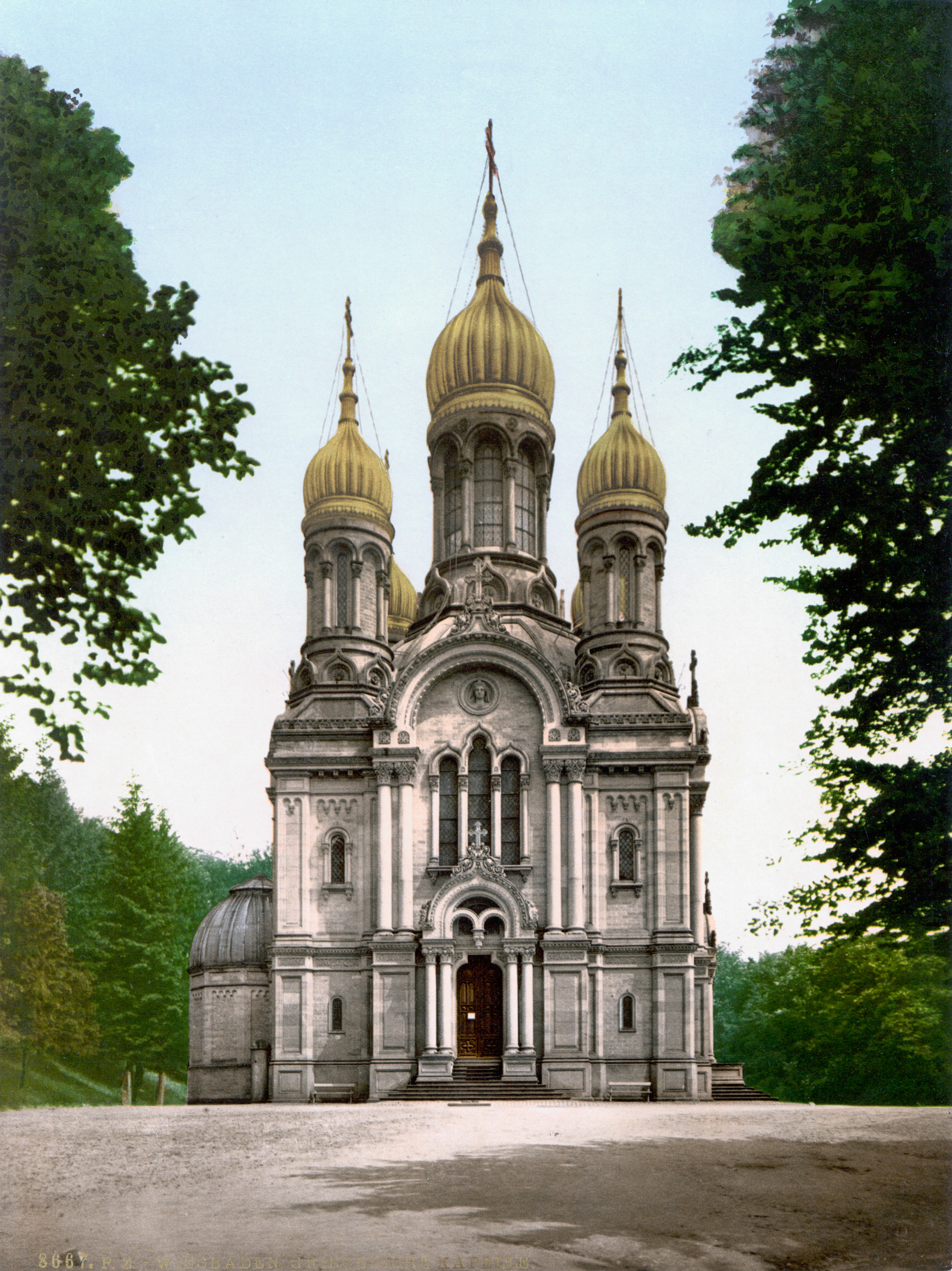
View from the west, c. 1900

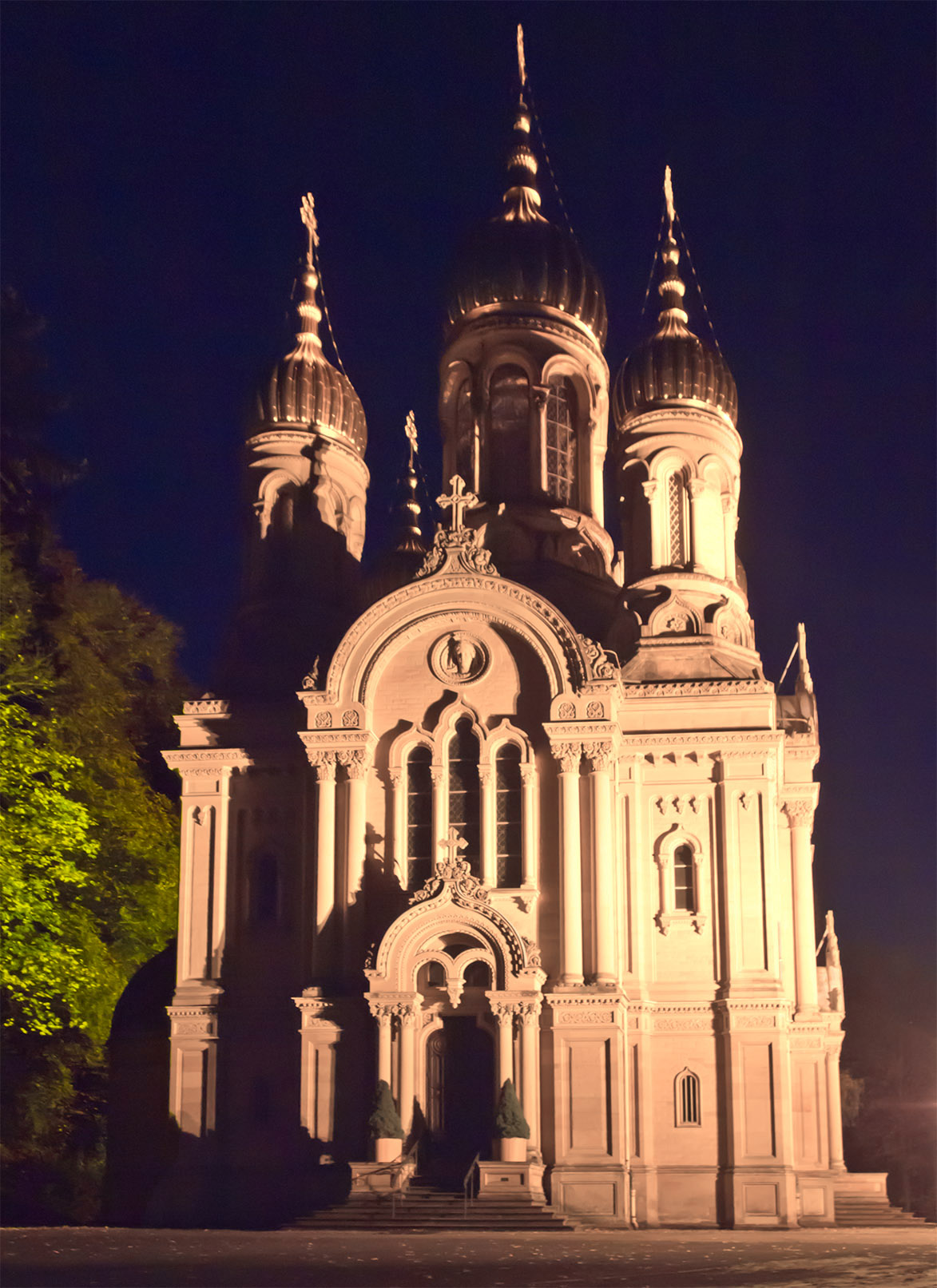
View from the west, at night

The Russian Orthodox Church of Saint Elizabeth in Wiesbaden (German: Russisch-Orthodoxe Kirche der heiligen Elisabeth in Wiesbaden; common local name Griechische Kapelle, "Greek chapel"; Russian: Русский православный храм Св. Праведной Елиcаветы в Висбадене) is the only Russian Orthodox church in Wiesbaden, Germany, and is located on Neroberg. Besides the Russian church there is a parsonage and a Russian cemetery, which is the largest in Europe (outside Russia itself). St. Elizabeth's Church and its parishioners belong to the Diocese of Germany in the Russian Orthodox Church Outside Russia.

== History ==
The Russian Orthodox Church in Wiesbaden was built from 1847 to 1855 by Duke Adolf of Nassau on the occasion of the death of his wife, the 19-year-old Grand Duchess Elizabeth Mikhailovna of Russia, niece of Emperor Nicholas I. Adolf and Elizabeth married in 1844, but the following year, she died in childbirth, as did their newborn daughter. He grieved so profoundly that he decided to build a church around her grave. He obtained the money for this church, with the blessing of Tsar Alexander lll, from her dowry.

Construction of the church was assigned to senior building officer (Oberbaurat) Philipp Hoffmann, who studied Russian church architecture, particularly at first in Russia. As a template for this church, he took the Cathedral of Christ the Saviour in Moscow. On 25 May 1855 the church was finally dedicated in honour of St. Elizabeth, the mother of John the Baptist and patron saint of the deceased princess. Shortly afterwards, the coffin containing the Grand Duchess and her baby was taken in a procession from St. Boniface's Church, its previous temporary shelter, into the crypt of the Russian church and buried there.

Simultaneously with the construction of the church were built a small rectory and a Russian cemetery, located about 100 meters northeast of the church.

The church was used by the already-existing Russian Orthodox community, mainly Russian guests, for whom Wiesbaden was a popular resort in the 19th century. Even Emperor Nicholas II worshipped in the church during his stay in Germany, together with his newly wedded-wife, Empress Alexandra Fyodorovna. This event is noted on a gold panel attached to the church.

A lasting community formed around the church only in the 1920s, when many White Emigres fled in the wake of the Russian Revolution, the Russian Civil War and the Bolshevik takeover of their country and came to Germany.

During the 1990s, the interior of the church, particularly its marble and frescoes, was renovated and restored. The crypt was renovated in 2002–2005.

== Architecture ==
=== Exterior ===
The church is a beige building of hard sandstone, still visible everywhere on the outside. The outer layout of the church is a square with an extended arc in the north. The building is "crowned" with five fiery-gilt domes, with the four smaller ones surrounding the large central dome to the northeast, northwest, southeast and southwest. The domes, typically for Russian churches, are onion-shaped and have grooves running lengthwise from top to bottom. Each dome is topped by a similarly gilt Orthodox cross. All crosses point to the south; the cross in the center is above and slightly larger than the other four, which are of the same size.

The domes rest on smaller cylindrical towers, with the main one in the centre higher and wider than the others. This is also at the top under the dome completely covered with window panes cover, so that here, light can fall directly into the interior of the church. The smaller towers have rather narrow, oblong windows, through which the light falls only inside the tower, since these are not connected with the interior. The northeast tower is an exception: this contains a spiral staircase, the entrance of which is directly under the dome; from here it is possible to reach the roof of the church by a small gate in the tower.

The church has two entrances: the south and the west entrance. The south entrance was originally only for Fürsten and other members of the nobility. It offered visitors leaving the building a panorama of Wiesbaden, which stood at the feet of the church. After the fall of the last Tsar, Nicholas II, in 1917, this entrance was sealed forever. The entrance for the "ordinary people" and the current main entrance was the west entrance. Visitors entering the church through this door see, as in most Russian Orthodox churches, the iconostasis opposite. Medallions of particular saints, crafted from sandstone, are located above the outside entrances. A medallion of Saint Helena rests above the west entrance; at the southern entrance, one of Saint Elizabeth (in whose honour the church was also consecrated); and on the east side, above the window of the sanctuary, one of the Holy Archangel Michael. These were the patron saints of the father (Mikhail) and mother (Elena) of the Grand Duchess, as well as her own (Elizabeth). Approximately ten steps of red sandstone lead up to the entrance, which is spanned by an arch that in turn sits on each side upon two columns.

== Other information ==
The church building was featured twice on stamps of the Deutsche Bundespost in the Sights definitive series (4 June 1991, face value 170 pfennig, intended to pay the double weight domestic letter rate; and 12 August 1993, with a revised face value of 41 pfennig for mass mailings of printed matters).

In addition, there is an illustration of the church on tourist signs on the Autobahnen around Wiesbaden.

== Notable burials ==
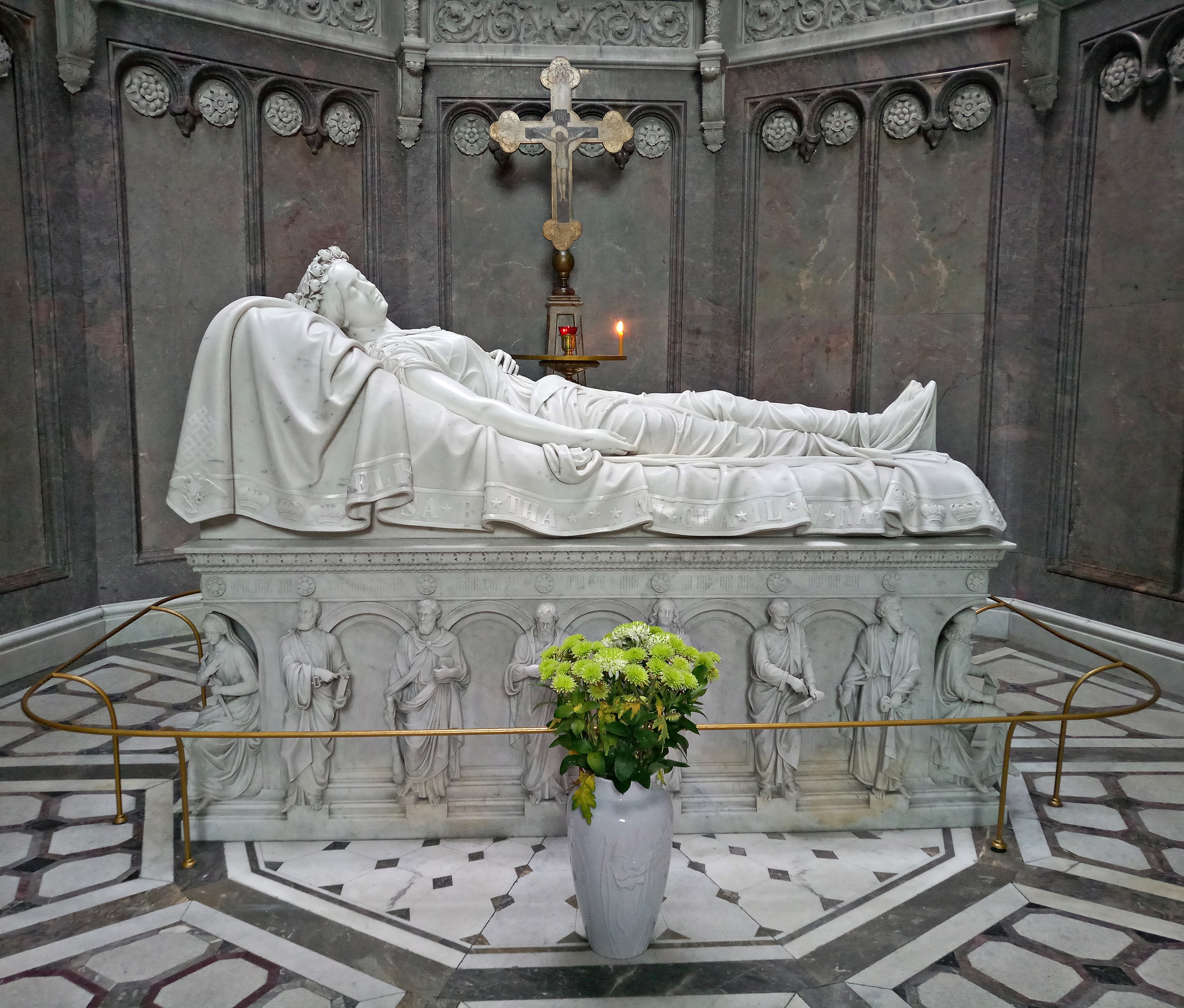
Tomb of Grand Duchess Elizabeth Mikhailovna

- Grand Duchess Elizabeth Mikhailovna of Russia (died 1845, reburied here 1855)
- Prince George Alexandrovich Yuryevsky, son of Tsar Alexander II (died 1913)
- Princess Olga Yurievskaya, Countess Merenberg, daughter of Tsar Alexander II (died 1925)
- Alexej von Jawlensky, Russian painter (died 1941)

== Bibliography ==
- Russische Kirche auf dem Neroberge in Wiesbaden – Geschichtlicher Ueberblick und Beschreibung der Kirche (Eigenverlag des Kirchenvorstandes, 1925)
- Erik Thomson, Karl Timoleon von Neff und die russische Kirche auf dem Neroberg in Wiesbaden. In: Hessische Heimat. Vol. 14/3, 1964)
- Alexander Hildebrand, Romantisches Symbol der Unsterblichkeit, Ebenmaß in allen Teilen. Die russisch-orthodoxe Kathedrale in Wiesbaden in Wiesbadener Leben 8/1994
- Wiesbaden – Russische Kirche, Kloster des Hl. Hiob von Počaev in München (Berlin and Munich, 3rd edition, 2000, ISBN 3-926165-95-2
- Karl Baedeker, Baedeker Wiesbaden Rheingau (Ostfildern-Kemnat 2001, ISBN 3-87954-076-4
- Gottfried Kiesow, Das verkannte Jahrhundert: Der Historismus am Beispiel Wiesbaden (Deutsche Stiftung Denkmalschutz, 2005, ISBN 3-936942-53-6
- Dirk Becker: Vivat Wiesbaden. Spaziergänge zwischen Tradition und Moderne. Ein Stadtführer für Wiesbaden und Umgebung (Universum, Wiesbaden, 2006, ISBN 3-89869-141-1
- Marc Peschke, Wiesbaden in Marc Peschke et al. Rheingau & Wiesbaden. Reise- und Weinführer (Bernd Ditter, Wiesbaden, 2006, ISBN 3-934962-06-8
- Maja Speranskij, Marina Werschewskaja, Gräber erzählen Geschichte. Die russisch-orthodoxe Kirche der hl. Elisabeth und ihr Friedhof in Wiesbaden (Kur- und Verkehrsverein, Wiesbaden, 2006, ISBN 3-9808639-7-2
