= Gregg Polsky =

American lawyer

Gregg Polsky is an American lawyer and law professor known for his work related to tax law. He is a professor of practice at the New York University School of Law.

== Early life and career ==
Polsky received a B.A. from Florida Atlantic University in 1993, a J.D. from the University of Florida Levin College of Law in 1996, and an LLM in taxation from the University of Florida Levin College of Law in 1998. He has been a law professor at the University of North Carolina at Chapel Hill, the University of Minnesota, the University of Georgia, and Florida State University.

Polsky has also worked as a professor in residence at the Internal Revenue Service. He was the Francis Schackelford Professor of Taxation Law at University of Georgia.

== Legal issues ==
Polsky is being sued for legal malpractice worth $35 million in a whistleblower case. The allegations include breach of professional and fiduciary duties.
