= Yuryev-Polsky =

Yuryev-Polsky (masculine), Yuryev-Polskaya (feminine), or Yuryev-Polskoye (neuter) may refer to:

- Yuryev-Polsky (town), a historical town in Yuryev-Polsky District of Vladimir Oblast, Russia
- Yuryev-Polsky District, a district of Vladimir Oblast, Russia
- Yuryev-Polsky Urban Settlement, a municipal formation into which the town of Yuryev-Polsky in Yuryev-Polsky District of Vladimir Oblast, Russia is incorporated
