= Alexander Vladimirovich Baryatinsky =

Russian nobleman (1870–1910)

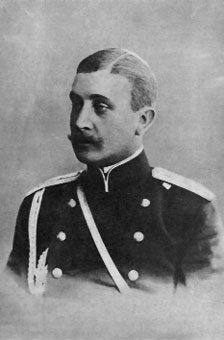
Prince A. V. Baryatinsky

Prince Alexander Vladimirovich Baryatinsky (Russian: Алекса́ндр Влади́мирович Баря́тинский; 22 May 1870 – 8 March 1910) was a Russian nobleman, staff captain, and bon vivant, widely known for his romance with the famous Italian opera singer Lina Cavalieri.

== Early life ==
Baryatinsky was the eldest son of Prince Vladimir Anatolyevich Baryatinsky (1843–1914), a general in the army, by his marriage to Countess Nadezhda Aleksandrovna Stenbock-Fermor (1847–1920). He was the grandson of Lieutenant-General Prince Anatoly Baryatinsky (1821–1881) and a cousin of Field Marshal Prince Alexander Baryatinsky (1815–1879). On his mother’s side, he was descended from the millionaire business man S. Y. Yakovlev.

He was educated at home and then at the Page Corps, becoming a page du chambre in October 1889. With his younger brother Anatoly, he hoped to be commissioned into the Horse Guards, but at the request of the Emperor Alexander III he instead went into the Nizhny Novgorod Regiment of Dragoons. As a headquarters-captain, he was an adjutant to Eugen, Duke of Leuchtenberg. In 1896 he was awarded the Order of St Stanislav (third class). In 1901, for family reasons, he resigned his commission.

== Lina Cavalieri ==
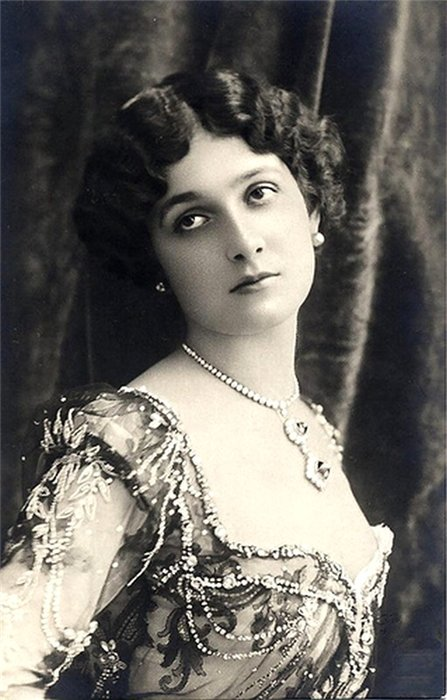
Lina Cavalieri

Baryatinsky was one of the richest men in Russia, which allowed him to lead a life of luxury. In 1897, he began an open affair with the famous opera singer and beauty Lina Cavalieri and spent huge sums of money on her. His passion for her was serious, and he asked the Emperor Nicholas II to give him permission to marry her, but his parents did all they could to prevent this from happening. In the summer of 1896, they had already had similar trouble, as they saw it, when their youngest son, Vladimir Baryatinsky, secretly married an actress, Yavorskaya. Their oldest son was heir to the dynasty of the Baryatinsky, and a marriage with Cavalieri would have discredited the whole family. They were supported by the Emperor, and Baryatinsky obeyed their will.

== Marriage and final years ==
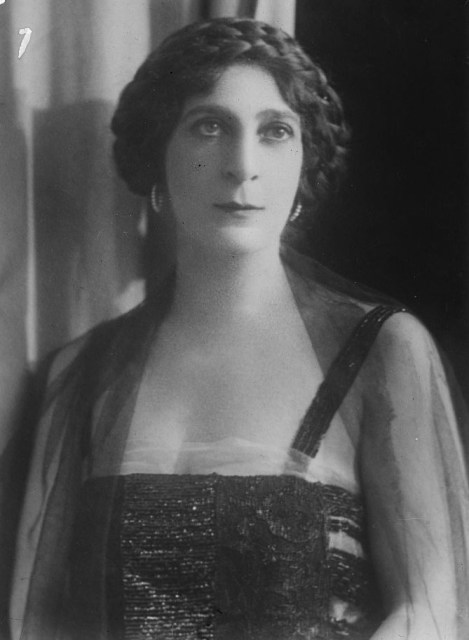
Princess Catherine Yuryevskaya

On 5 October 1901, in Biarritz, Baryatinsky married the "amazingly beautiful" Princess Catherine Alexandrovna Yurievskaya (1878–1959), a daughter of the Emperor Alexander II by his morganatic marriage with Catherine Dolgorukov. After the wedding, they lived mainly abroad, where Baryatinsky was well-known in high society. In Paris, they lived at number 6, Place des États-Unis, where their son Andrei Alexandrovich was born in 1902. A second son, Alexander, was born at Pau, Pyrénées-Atlantiques, in 1905.

The Baryatinskys spent the winter of 1909–1910 in Florence, where they rented a villa. There, Baryatinsky suffered his first apoplectic attack, but began to recover. A few months later, while playing bridge with friends, he fell to the floor and passed out. A few days later, on 8 March 1910, without having regained consciousness, he died of acute meningitis and was buried in a cemetery in Florence. He was survived by his widow and two young sons.

On 6 October 1916, at Yalta, Catherine Baryatinsky married secondly Prince Serge Obolensky (1890–1978), a son of General Prince Platon Sergeievich Obolensky.

According to a contemporary:

Baryatinsky was a charming man; he aroused sympathy in everyone and was an attractive personality. And although critics could accuse him of extravagance, he was nonetheless a very important person. The only thing he lacked was Rockefeller's luck. Money seemed to flow through his fingers like water, and he always said "Enough for today." Nevertheless, his pleasant manners and deep mind made up for his impracticality.

== Family ==
After the death of his father in 1910 and his grandfather in 1914, Andrei Alexandrovich Baryatinsky (1902–1944) inherited one of the richest estates in Russia, but was made destitute by the revolution. In 1925, he married Marie Paule Jedlinski (1906–1971), and they had one daughter, Elena (1927–1988), who was married three times. Andrei Alexandrovich earned a living by physical labor and died in Libya.

Alexander Alexandrovich Baryatinsky (1905–1992), a godson of Grand Duke Michael Nikolaevich, was twice married, but did not have children. He died in Grants Pass, Oregon.

== See also ==
- Yury Baryatinsky
- Aleksandr Baryatinsky
- Leonilla Bariatinskaya
