= History of Asia =

The history of Asia can be seen as the collective history of East Asia, South Asia, Southeast Asia, Central Asia, North Asia and West Asia. The continent is home to two of the world's oldest, continuous civilizations, Chinese civilization and Indian civilization.

Asia was also home to the Mesopotamian, Ancient Egypt, Indus Valley and Yellow River civilizations. These civilizations were among the first in the world, and developed around fertile river valleys as they were conducive to agriculture. They shared similarities and likely exchanged technologies and ideas such as mathematics and the wheel. Other inventions such as writing likely developed independently as did cities, states, and empires.

The Eurasian steppe had long been inhabited by nomads, and from the central steppes, they could reach all parts of the Asian continent. The northern part of the continent, covering much of Siberia was inaccessible to the steppe nomads due to the dense forests and the tundra. These areas in Siberia were very sparsely populated. Mountains and deserts such as the Caucasus, Himalayas, Karakum and Gobi Desert formed natural barriers against the steppe nomads. The urban centers were technologically and culturally more advanced, but could do little militarily to defend against the mounted hordes of the steppe. However, the lowlands did not have enough open grassland to support a large horse mounted force. Thus the nomads who conquered states in West Asia were soon forced to adopt local customs.

Asia has been the birthplace of many religions. They include Abrahamic religions such as Judaism, Christianity and Islam, Indian religions such as Hinduism, Buddhism, Jainism and Sikhism, and Iranian religions such as Zoroastrianism and the now extinct religion of Manichaeism. The spread of Islam ushered in the Islamic Golden Age and the Timurid Renaissance, which later went on to influence the Islamic gunpowder empires.

The history of Asia includes major developments such as the invention of gunpowder in medieval China, which was later developed by the gunpowder empires, mainly the Mughals and Safavids, and led to significant advancements in warfare. The Silk Road, helped spread cultures, languages, religions, as well as diseases throughout Asia and Europe.

== Prehistory ==
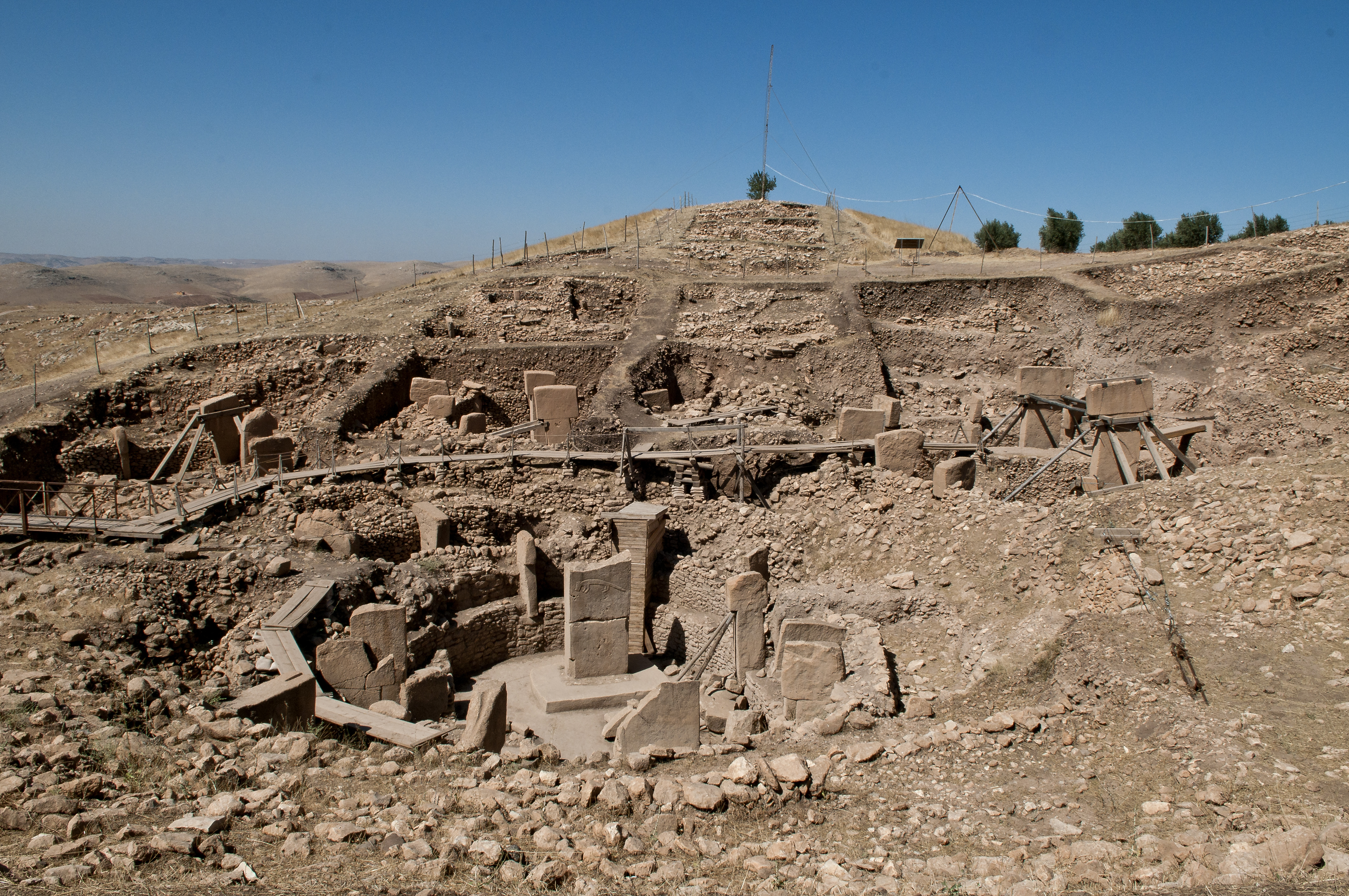
Some henges at Göbekli Tepe in Turkey were erected as far back as 9600 BC, predating those of Stonehenge, by over seven millennia.

A report by archaeologist Rakesh Tewari on Lahuradewa, India shows new C14 datings that range between 9000 and 8000 BC associated with rice, making Lahuradewa the earliest Neolithic site in entire South Asia. Settled life emerged on the subcontinent in the western margins of the Indus River alluvium approximately 9,000 years ago, evolving gradually into the Indus Valley Civilisation of the third millennium BC.

Göbekli Tepe is a Neolithic site in the Anatolia of Turkey. Dated to the Pre-Pottery Neolithic, between c. 9500 and 8000 BC, the site comprises a number of large circular structures supported by massive stone pillars – the world's oldest known megaliths.

The prehistoric Beifudi site near Yixian in Hebei Province, China, contains relics of a culture contemporaneous with the Cishan and Xinglongwa cultures of about 8000–7000 BC, Neolithic cultures east of the Taihang Mountains, filling in an archaeological gap between the two Northern Chinese cultures. The total excavated area is more than 1,200 square meters and the collection of Neolithic findings at the site consists of two phases.

Around 5500 BC the Halafian culture appeared in the modern-day countries of Lebanon, Israel, Syria, Anatolia, and northern Mesopotamia, based upon dryland agriculture.

In southern Mesopotamia were the alluvial plains of Sumer and Elam. Since there was little rainfall, irrigation systems were necessary. The Ubaid culture flourished from 5500 BC.

== Ancient ==
=== Bronze Age ===
Invasions, destruction and possible population movements during the Late Bronze Age collapse, beginning c. 1200 BC

The Chalcolithic period (or Copper Age) began about 4500 BC, then the Bronze Age began about 3500 BC, replacing the Neolithic cultures.

The Indus Valley civilization (IVC) was a Bronze Age civilization (3300–1300 BC; mature period 2600–1900 BC) which was centered mostly in the western part of the Indian subcontinent; it is considered that an early form of Hinduism was performed during this civilization. Some of the great cities of this civilization include Harappa and Mohenjo-daro, which had a high level of town planning and arts. The cause of the destruction of these regions around 1700 BC is debatable, although evidence suggests it was caused by natural disasters (especially flooding). This era marks Vedic period in India, which lasted from roughly 1500 to 500 BC. During this period, the Sanskrit language developed and the Vedas were written, epic hymns that told tales of gods and wars. This was the basis for the Vedic religion, which would eventually sophisticate and develop into Hinduism.

China and Vietnam were also centres of metalworking. Dating back to the Neolithic Age, the first bronze drums, the Dong Son drums, have been uncovered in and around the Red River Delta regions of Vietnam and Southern China. These relate to the prehistoric Dong Son Culture of Vietnam.

In Ban Chiang, Thailand, bronze artifacts have been discovered dating to 2100 BC. In Nyaunggan, Burma bronze tools have been excavated along with ceramics and stone artifacts. Dating is still currently broad (3500–500 BC).

=== Iron and Axial Age ===
The Iron Age saw the widespread use of iron tools, weaponry, and armor throughout the major civilizations of Asia.

==== West Asia ====
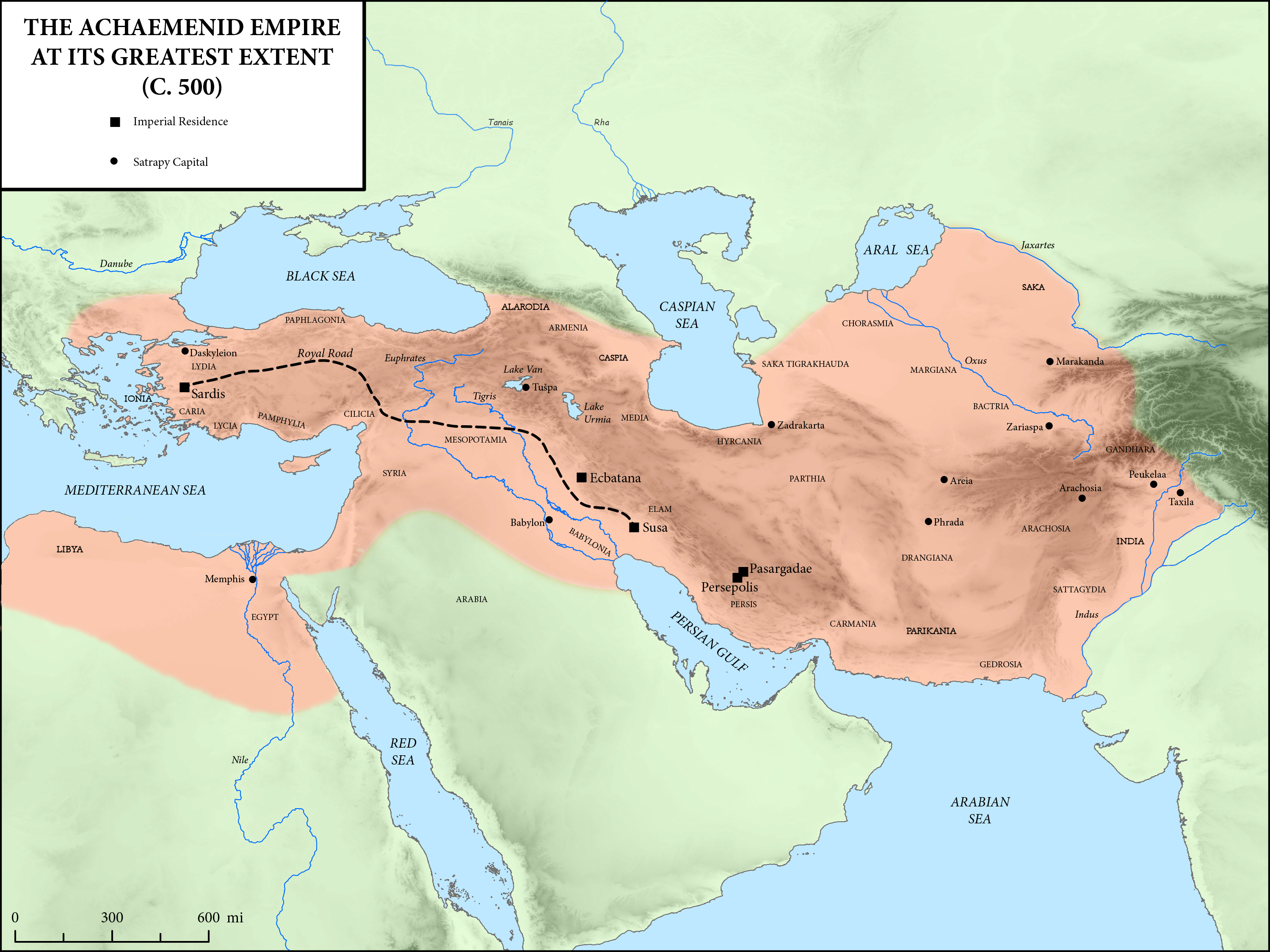
The First Persian Empire at its greatest extent, c. 500 BC

The Achaemenid Empire founded by Cyrus the Great, ruled a vast area stretching from Greece to the Indus River and the Aral Sea from the 6th to 4th centuries BC. Persian politics included a tolerance for other cultures, a highly centralized government, and significant infrastructure developments. Later, during the reign of Darius the Great, the territories were integrated, a bureaucracy was developed, nobility were assigned military positions, tax collection was carefully organized, and spies were used to ensure the loyalty of regional officials.

The primary religion of Persia at this time was Zoroastrianism. Developed by the philosopher Zoroaster, the religion introduced an early form of monotheism to the area and tenets such as spiritual salvation through personal moral action, an end time, and both general and Particular judgment with a heaven or hell. Rooted in ancient religious practices predating known history, these concepts would heavily influence later emperors and the masses throughout West Asia and adjacent regions under Persian rule.

The Persian Empire was successful in establishing peace and stability throughout the region, and was a major influence in art, politics (affecting Hellenistic leaders), and religion.

Alexander the Great conquered this dynasty in the 4th century BC, creating the brief Hellenistic period. However, he was unable to set stability; after his death, his empire fragmented into successor states, including the Seleucid Empire and the Ptolemaic Kingdom under Ptolemy I Soter. Persia itself later broke into smaller, weaker dynasties, including periods of Seleucid control, followed by the Parthian Empire. By the end of the Classical age, Persia had been reconsolidated into the Sasanian Empire, also known as the second Persian Empire.

The Roman Empire would later control parts of Western Asia. During the Hellenistic period, the Seleucid Empire and the Ptolemaic Kingdom were major powers in West Asia and the Eastern Mediterranean, while the later Parthian and Sasanian dynasties of Persia dominated much of West Asia for centuries.

==== India ====
The Maurya and Gupta empires are called the Golden Age of India and were marked by extensive inventions and discoveries in science, technology, art, religion, and philosophy that crystallized the elements of what is generally known as Indian culture. The religions of Hinduism and Buddhism, which originated in the Indian subcontinent, were important influences on South, East and Southeast Asia.

Hinduism expansion in Asia, from its heartland in Indian subcontinent, to the rest of Asia, especially Southeast Asia, started circa 1st century marked with the establishment of early Hindu settlements and polities in Southeast Asia.

By 600 BC, the Indian subcontinent was politically fragmented into numerous states, including the sixteen major Mahājanapadas (Sanskrit: महाजनपद) and many smaller kingdoms and republics that often competed and feuded with one another.

In 327 BC, Alexander the Great advanced through Bactria and crossed into northwestern India. He campaigned across the Punjab to the Beas River, but his army refused to march farther east into the Ganges basin, forcing him to retreat. The Macedonian withdrawal weakened Greek control in the region and opened the way for new powers.

Shortly afterward, Chandragupta Maurya, with the counsel of Chanakya, overthrew the Nanda dynasty around 321 BC and established the Maurya Empire (Sanskrit: मौर्य राजवंश, Maurya Rājavaṃśa). The Mauryan state became one of the world’s largest empires of its time, stretching north to the Himalayas, east into what is now Assam, west beyond modern Pakistan, and annexing Balochistan and much of present-day Afghanistan at its greatest extent. South of the empire lay Tamilakam, an independent region dominated by the Cholas, Pandyas, and Cheras.

The Mauryan Empire was notable for its sophisticated administration. Chandragupta and his successors ruled through an autocratic monarchy supported by a standing army, provincial governors, a complex bureaucracy, a regulated taxation system, state monopolies in key commodities, standardized coinage, and even a postal network.

Chandragupta’s grandson, Ashoka (r. 268–232 BC), expanded Mauryan control across almost the entire subcontinent (except for the southern tip). Following his conversion to Buddhism, Ashoka promoted dhamma (Sanskrit: धर्म, Pali: धम्म, dhamma = righteousness), non-violence, and public welfare through his famous edicts, leaving a lasting impact on Indian society and religion. After Ashoka’s death, the empire gradually fragmented; by 185 BC the last Mauryan ruler was overthrown, and successor states arose in the north and northwest, including the Śuṅgas, Indo-Greeks, and Śakas.

The Kushan Empire (Sanskrit: कुषाण राजवंश, Kuṣāṇa Rājavaṃśa; 1st–3rd centuries AD), founded by Central Asian invaders from the northwest, became a major power across northern India and Central Asia. Under Emperor Kanishka (c. 127–150 AD), the Kushans were notable patrons of Buddhism, supporting its spread along the Silk Roads into Central Asia and China. While Buddhism flourished under their rule, in later centuries its close association with foreign dynasties contributed to perceptions of it as an “outside” religion, a factor in its eventual decline within India.

The Gupta Empire (Sanskrit: गुप्त राजवंश, Gupta Rājavaṃśa), founded by Chandragupta I around AD 320, later unified much of northern India through conquest and alliance. Gupta rule covered less territory than the Mauryas but brought long-lasting stability and is remembered as a classical age of Indian civilization, marked by advances in art, science, and literature. By the mid-6th century AD, sustained invasions by the Hūṇas and internal divisions contributed to Gupta decline and fragmentation.

==== Classical China ====
===== Zhou dynasty =====
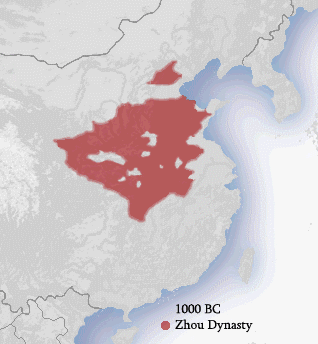
Population concentration and boundaries of the Western Zhou dynasty in China

Since 1029 BC, the Zhou dynasty (Chinese: 周朝; pinyin: Zhōu Cháo; Wade–Giles: Chou Ch'ao [tʂóʊ tʂʰɑ̌ʊ]), had existed in China and it would continue to until 258 BC. The Zhou dynasty had been using a feudal system by giving power to local nobility and relying on their loyalty in order to control its large territory. As a result, the Chinese government at this time tended to be very decentralized and weak, and there was often little the emperor could do to resolve national issues. Nonetheless, the government was able to retain its position with the creation of the Mandate of Heaven, which could establish an emperor as divinely chosen to rule. The Zhou additionally discouraged the human sacrifice of the preceding eras and unified the Chinese language. Finally, the Zhou government encouraged settlers to move into the Yangtze River valley, thus creating the Chinese Middle Kingdom.

But by 500 BC, its political stability began to decline due to repeated nomadic incursions and internal conflict derived from the fighting princes and families. This was lessened by the many philosophical movements, starting with the life of Confucius. His philosophical writings (called Confucianism) concerning the respect of elders and of the state would later be popularly used in the Han dynasty. Additionally, Laozi's concepts of Taoism, including yin and yang and the innate duality and balance of nature and the universe, became popular throughout this period. Nevertheless, the Zhou dynasty eventually disintegrated as the local nobles began to gain more power and their conflict devolved into the Warring States period, from 402 to 201 BC.

===== Qin dynasty =====
One leader eventually came on top, Qin Shi Huang (Chinese: 始皇帝, Shǐ Huángdì), who overthrew the last Zhou emperor and established the Qin dynasty. The Qin dynasty (Chinese: 秦朝; pinyin: Qín Cháo) was the first ruling dynasty of Imperial China, lasting from 221 to 207 BC. The new Emperor abolished the feudal system and directly appointed a bureaucracy that would rely on him for power. Huang's imperial forces crushed any regional resistance, and they furthered the Chinese empire by expanding down to the South China Sea and northern Vietnam. Greater organization brought a uniform tax system, a national census, regulated road building (and cart width), standard measurements, standard coinage, and an official written and spoken language. Further reforms included new irrigation projects, the encouragement of silk manufacturing, and most famously, the beginning of the construction of the Great Wall of China—designed to keep out the nomadic raiders who'd constantly badger the Chinese people. However, Shi Huang was infamous for his tyranny, forcing laborers to build the Wall, ordering heavy taxes, and severely punishing all who opposed him. He oppressed Confucians and promoted Legalism, the idea that people were inherently evil, and that a strong, forceful government was needed to control them. Legalism was infused with realistic, logical views and rejected the pleasures of educated conversation as frivolous. All of this made Shi Huang extremely unpopular with the people. As the Qin began to weaken, various factions began to fight for control of China.

===== Han dynasty =====
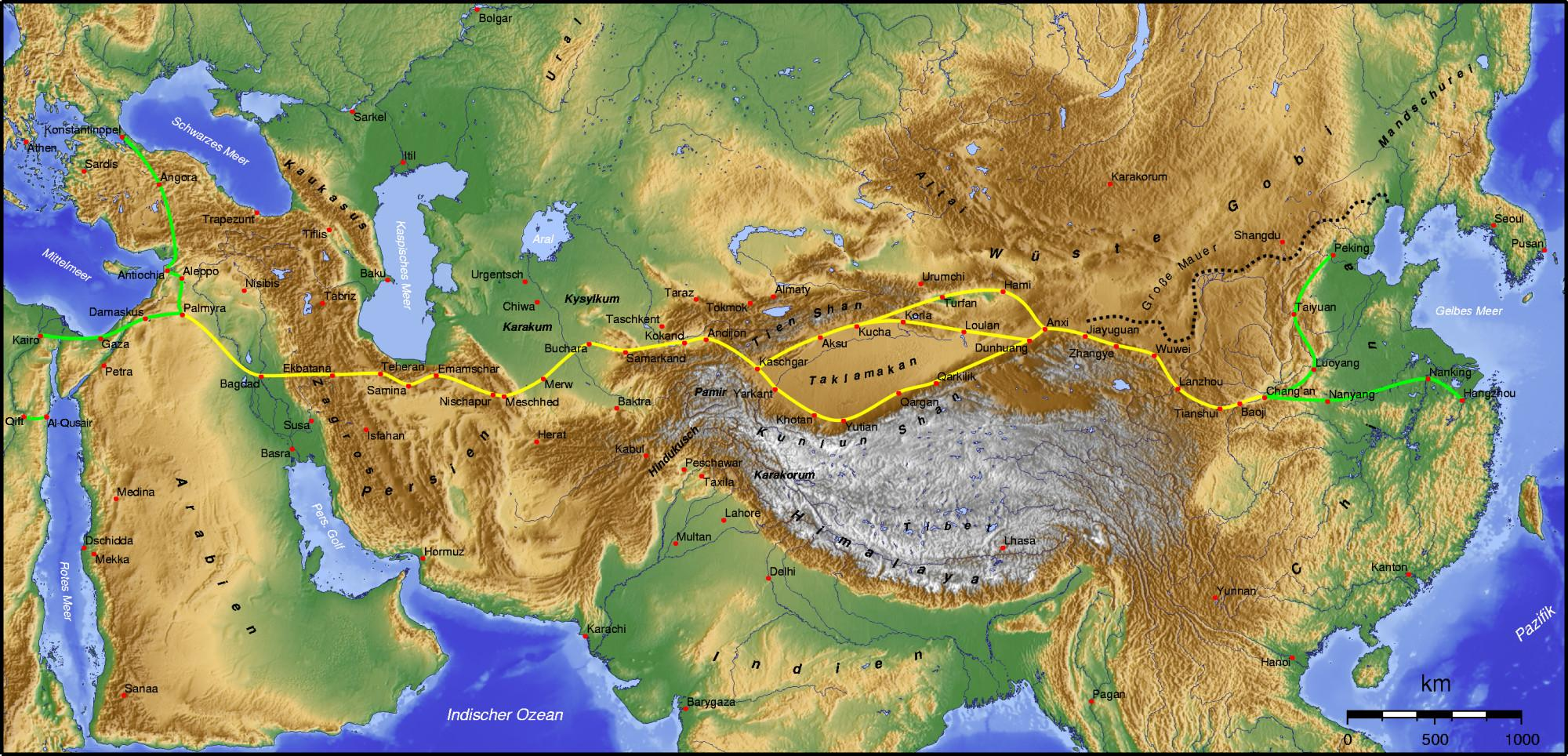
The Silk Road in Asia

The Han dynasty (simplified Chinese: 汉朝; traditional Chinese: 漢朝; pinyin: Hàn Cháo; 206 BC – 220 AD) was the second imperial dynasty of China, preceded by the Qin dynasty and succeeded by the Three Kingdoms (220–265 AD). Spanning over four centuries, the period of the Han dynasty is considered a golden age in Chinese history. One of the Han dynasty's greatest emperors, Emperor Wu of Han, established a peace throughout China comparable to the Pax Romana seen in the Mediterranean a hundred years later. To this day, China's majority ethnic group refers to itself as the "Han Chinese". The Han dynasty was established when two peasants succeeded in rising up against Shi Huang's significantly weaker successor-son. The new Han government retained the centralization and bureaucracy of the Qin, but greatly reduced the repression seen before. They expanded their territory into Korea, Vietnam, and Central Asia, creating an even larger empire than the Qin.

The Han developed contacts with the Persian Empire in the Middle East and the Romans, through the Silk Road, with which they were able to trade many commodities—primarily silk. Many ancient civilizations were influenced by the Silk Road, which connected China, India, the Middle East and Europe. Han emperors like Wu also promoted Confucianism as the national "religion" (although it is debated by theologians as to whether it is defined as such or as a philosophy). Shrines devoted to Confucius were built and Confucian philosophy was taught to all scholars who entered the Chinese bureaucracy. The bureaucracy was further improved with the introduction of an examination system that selected scholars of high merit. These bureaucrats were often upper-class people educated in special schools, but whose power was often checked by the lower-class brought into the bureaucracy through their skill. The Chinese imperial bureaucracy was very effective and highly respected by all in the realm and would last over 2,000 years. The Han government was highly organized and it commanded the military, judicial law (which used a system of courts and strict laws), agricultural production, the economy, and the general lives of its people. The government also promoted intellectual philosophy, scientific research, and detailed historical records.

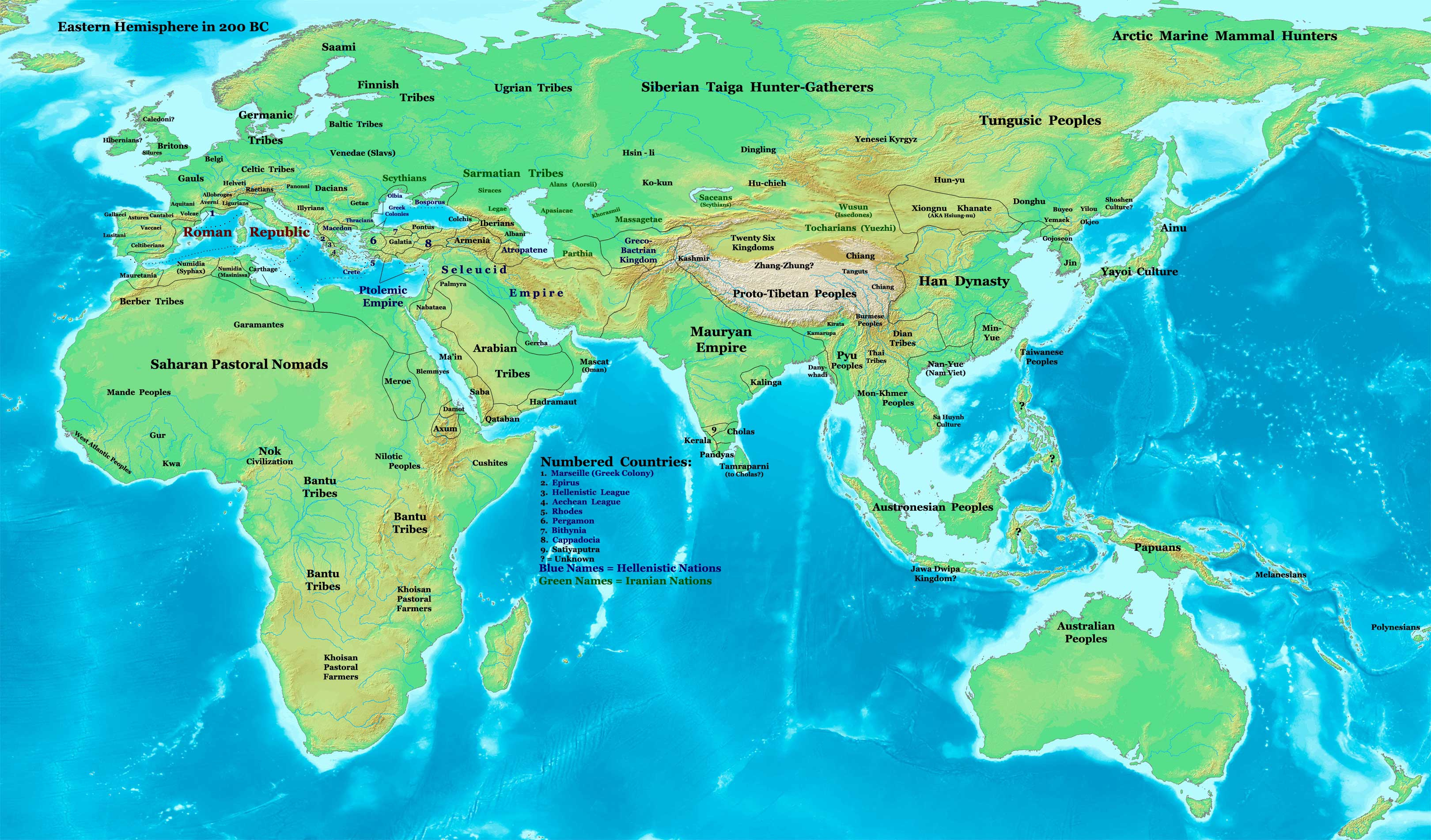
The Han dynasty and main polities in Asia c. 200 BC

However, despite all of this impressive stability, central power began to lose control by the turn of the Common Era. As the Han dynasty declined, many factors continued to pummel it into submission until China was left in a state of chaos. By 100 AD, philosophical activity slowed, and corruption ran rampant in the bureaucracy. Local landlords began to take control as the scholars neglected their duties, and this resulted in heavy taxation of the peasantry. Taoists began to gain significant ground and protested the decline. They started to proclaim magical powers and promised to save China with them; the Taoist Yellow Turban Rebellion in 184 (led by rebels in yellow scarves) failed but was able to weaken the government. The aforementioned Huns combined with diseases killed up to half of the population and officially ended the Han dynasty by 220. The ensuing period of chaos was so terrible it lasted for three centuries, where many weak regional rulers and dynasties failed to establish order in China. This period of chaos and attempts at order is commonly known as that of the Six Dynasties. The first part of this included the Three Kingdoms which started in 220 and describes the brief and weak successor "dynasties" that followed the Han. In 265, the Jin dynasty of China was started and this soon split into two different empires in control of northwestern and southeastern China. In 420, the conquest and abdication of those two dynasties resulted in the first of the Southern and Northern dynasties. The Northern and Southern dynasties passed through until finally, by 557, the Northern Zhou dynasty ruled the north and the Chen dynasty ruled the south.

== Medieval ==
During this period, the Eastern world empires continued to expand through trade, migration and conquests of neighboring areas. Gunpowder was widely used as early as the 11th century and they were using moveable type printing five hundred years before Gutenberg created his press. Buddhism, Taoism, Confucianism were the dominant philosophies of the Far East during the Middle Ages. Marco Polo was not the first Westerner to travel to the Orient and return with amazing stories of this different culture, but his accounts published in the late 13th and early 14th centuries were the first to be widely read throughout Europe.

=== West Asia (Middle East) ===
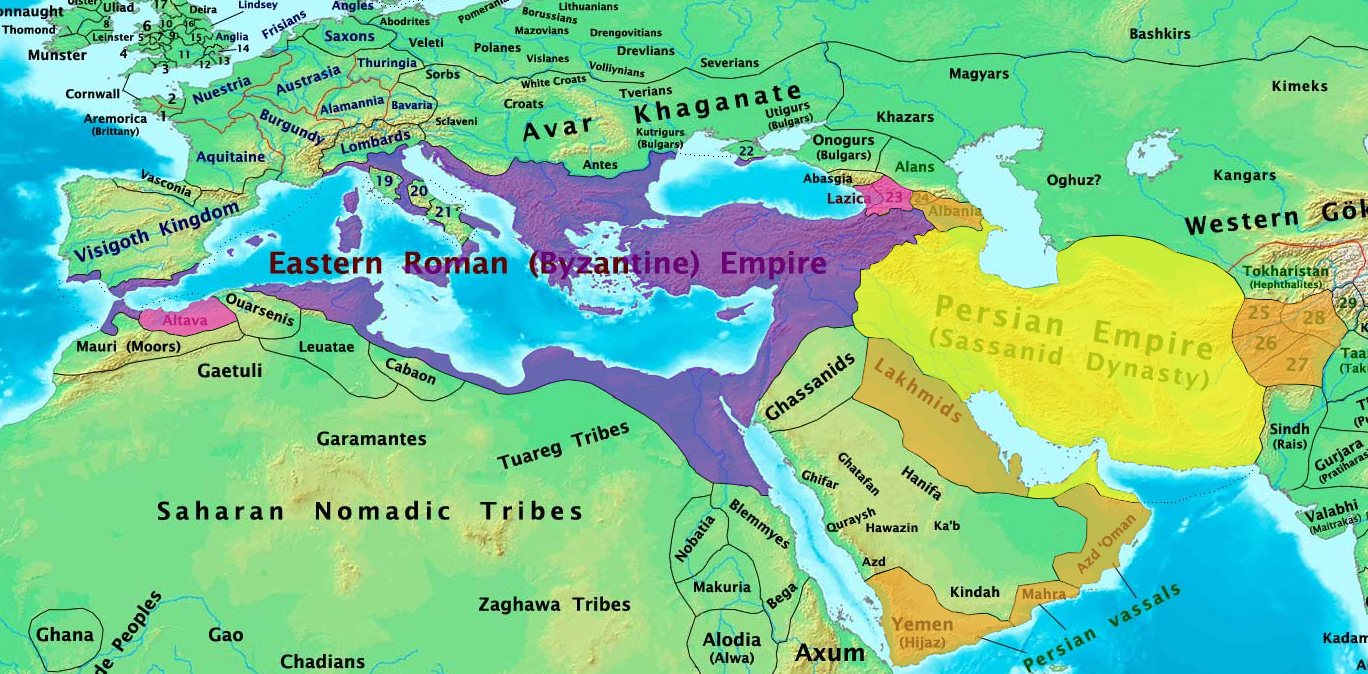
Byzantine and Sasanian Empires in 600 AD

The Arabian peninsula and the wider West Asia saw dramatic change during the Medieval era caused primarily by the spread of Islam and the establishment of the early Islamic empires.

In the 5th century, West Asia was generally separated into small, weakened states; with the two major powers, the Sasanian Empire and the Byzantine Empire dominating the region. The Byzantines and Sasanians fought each other continually, reflecting the long-standing rivalry between the Roman Empire and the Persian Empire during the previous five hundred years. The fighting weakened both states, leaving the stage open to a new power. Meanwhile, the nomadic Bedouin tribes who dominated the Arabian desert experienced a period of tribal stabilization, expanding trade networks, and increasing familiarity with Abrahamic religions and forms of monotheism.

While the Byzantine Roman and Sasanian Persian empires were both severely weakened by the Byzantine–Sasanian War of 602–628, a new power in the form of Islam emerged in Arabia under Muhammad in Medina. In a series of rapid Muslim conquests, the Rashidun army, led by the Caliphs and commanders such as Khalid ibn al-Walid, swept through much of the Middle East, taking significant Byzantine territories in the Arab–Byzantine wars, including Syria and Egypt, and completely engulfing Persia in the Muslim conquest of Persia. The succeeding Caliphates of the Middle Ages unified much of West Asia and North Africa as a distinct political sphere and fostered the consolidation of a broader Arab cultural identity. These Caliphates included the Rashidun Caliphate, Umayyad Caliphate, Abbasid Caliphate, and later the Seljuk Empire.

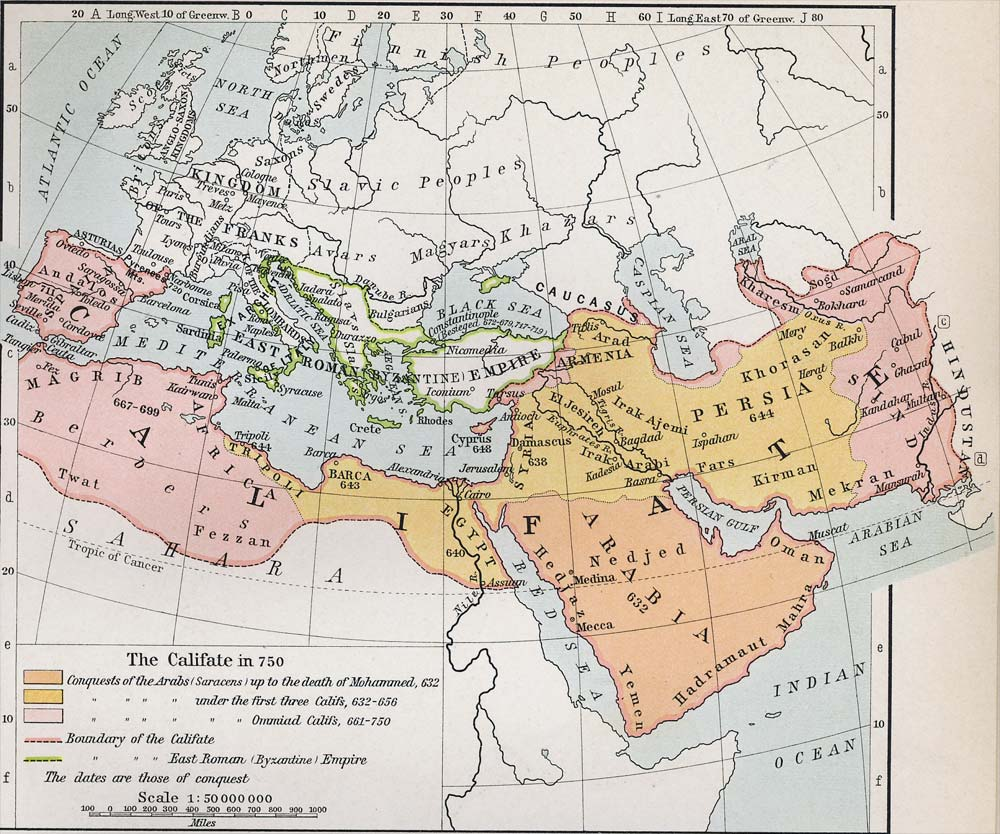
The early Muslim conquests, 622–750

Following the rise of Islam, the region entered a period often referred to as the Islamic Golden Age, marked by major developments in architecture, preservation and advancement of classical knowledge, and innovations in medicine, algebra, geometry, astronomy, anatomy, and ethics. Scholars working in centers such as Baghdad, and Cairo played key roles in transmitting knowledge that later influenced Western Europe.

The dominance of Arab political power declined in the mid-11th century with the arrival of the Seljuq Turks, who migrated south from Central Asia. They conquered Persia, Iraq, Syria, Palestine, and parts of Anatolia. This period was followed by a series of invasions from Western Europe during the Crusades. In 1099, the knights of the First Crusade captured Jerusalem and founded the Kingdom of Jerusalem, which survived until 1187 when Saladin retook the city. Smaller crusader states endured until 1291. In the early 13th century, a new wave of invaders, the armies of the Mongol Empire, swept through the region, sacking Baghdad in the Siege of Baghdad (1258) and advancing as far south as the border of Egypt, where they were halted by the Mamluk Sultanate at the Battle of Ain Jalut in 1260. The Mongols eventually withdrew, but the instability that followed reshaped regional power structures. In 1401, the region was further destabilized by the campaigns of the Turco-Mongol ruler Timur. By this time, another Turkic power had risen in northwestern Anatolia: the Ottoman Empire.

=== South Asia ===
==== India ====
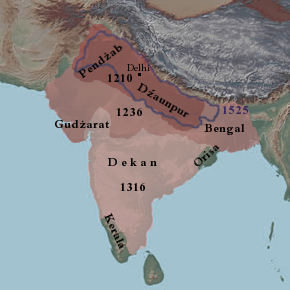
Expansion of the Delhi Sultanate

The Indian early medieval age, 600 to 1200, is defined by regional kingdoms and cultural diversity. When Harsha of Kannauj, who ruled much of the Indo-Gangetic Plain from 606 to 647, attempted to expand southwards, he was defeated by the Chalukya ruler of the Deccan. When his successor attempted to expand eastwards, he was defeated by the Pala king of Bengal. When the Chalukyas attempted to expand southwards, they were defeated by the Pallavas from farther south, who in turn were opposed by the Pandyas and the Cholas from still farther south. The Cholas could under the rule of Raja Raja Chola defeat their rivals and rise to a regional power. Cholas expanded northward and defeated Eastern Chalukya, Kalinga and the Pala. Under Rajendra Chola the Cholas created the first notable navy of Indian subcontinent. The Chola navy extended the influence of Chola Empire to Southeast Asia. During this time, pastoral peoples whose land had been cleared to make way for the growing agricultural economy were accommodated within caste society, as were new non-traditional ruling classes. The Muslim conquest in the Indian subcontinent mainly took place from the 12th century onwards, though earlier Muslim conquests include the limited inroads into modern Afghanistan and Pakistan and the Umayyad campaigns in India, during the time of the Rajput kingdoms in the 8th century.

Major economic and military powers like the Delhi Sultanate and Bengal Sultanate, were seen to be established. The search of their wealth led the Voyages of Christopher Columbus.

Sher Shah Suri of the Sur Empire of India introduced the standardised rūpya coin in the 16th century now used as the currency of Indonesia, India, Pakistan, Bangladesh, Sri Lanka and Nepal.

The Vijayanagara Empire based in the Deccan Plateau region of South India, was established in 1336 by the brothers Harihara I and Bukka Raya I of the Sangama dynasty, patronized by saint Vidyaranya, the 12th Shankaracharya of Sringeri in Karnataka. The empire rose to prominence as a result of attempts by the southern powers to resist and ward off Turkic Islamic invasions by the end of the 13th century. At its peak, it subjugated almost all of South India's rulers and pushed the sultans of the Deccan beyond the Tungabhadra-Krishna river region. After annexing modern day Odisha (ancient Kalinga) from the Gajapati Empire, became a notable power. The empire lasted until 1646 after a major military defeat in the Battle of Talikota in 1565 by the combined armies of the Deccan sultanates.

=== East Asia ===
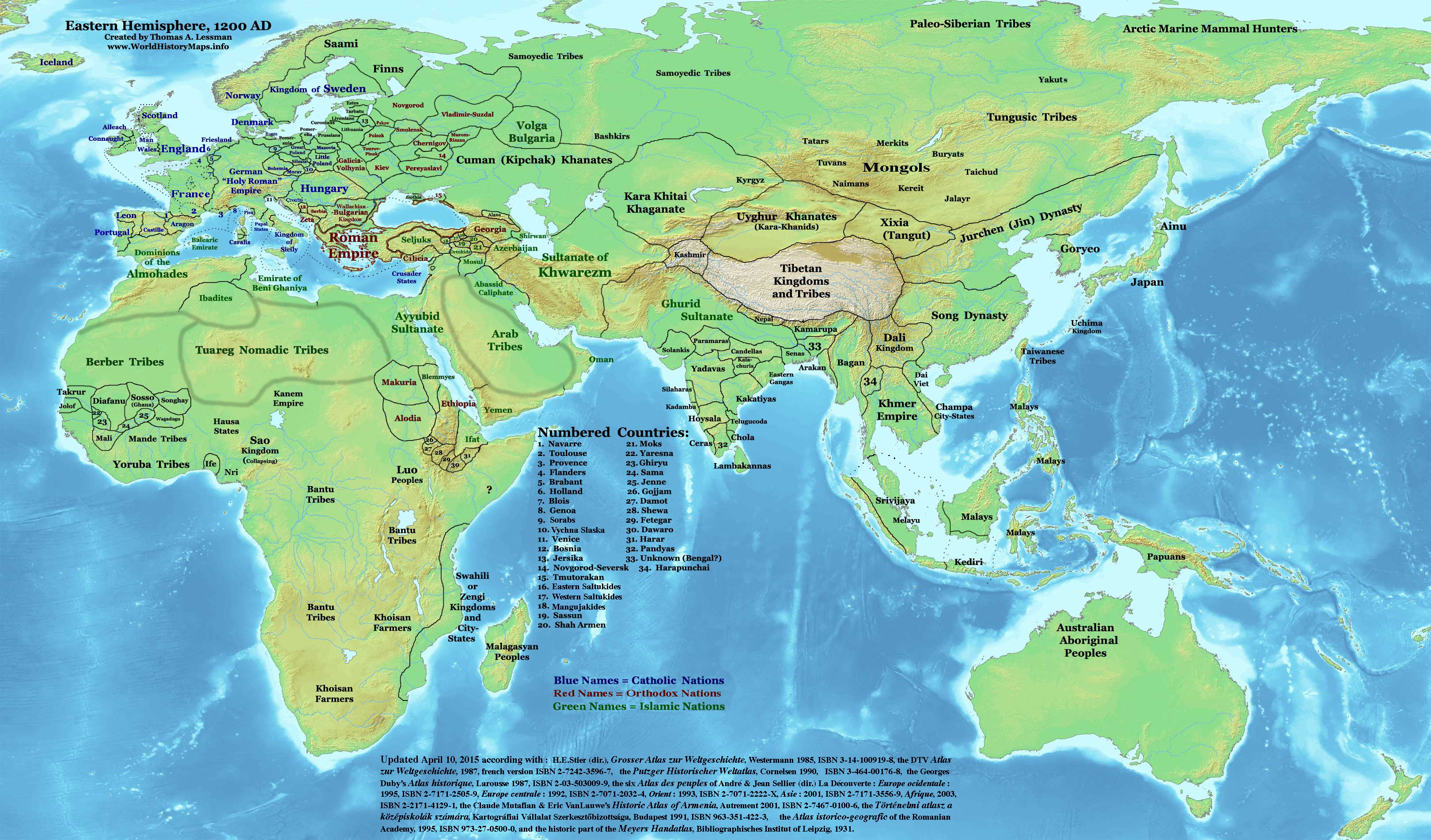
The Song dynasty and main polities in Asia c. 1200

==== China ====
China saw the rise and fall of the Sui, Tang, Song, and Yuan dynasties and therefore improvements in its bureaucracy, the spread of Buddhism, and the advent of Neo-Confucianism. It was an unsurpassed era for Chinese ceramics and painting. Medieval architectural masterpieces the Great South Gate in Todaiji, Japan, and the Tienning Temple in Peking, China are some of the surviving constructs from this era.

===== Sui dynasty =====
A new powerful dynasty began to rise in the 580s, amongst the divided factions of China. This was started when an aristocrat named Yang Jian married his daughter into the Northern Zhou dynasty. He proclaimed himself Emperor Wen of Sui and appeased the nomadic military by abandoning the Confucian scholar-gentry. Emperor Wen soon led the conquest of the southern Chen dynasty and united China once more under the Sui dynasty. The emperor lowered taxes and constructed granaries that he used to prevent famine and control the market. Later Wen's son would murder him for the throne and declare himself Emperor Yang of Sui. Emperor Yang revived the Confucian scholars and the bureaucracy, much to anger of the aristocrats and nomadic military leaders. Yang became an excessive leader who overused China's resources for personal luxury and perpetuated exhaustive attempts to conquer Goguryeo. His military failures and neglect of the empire forced his own ministers to assassinate him in 618, ending the Sui dynasty.

===== Tang dynasty =====
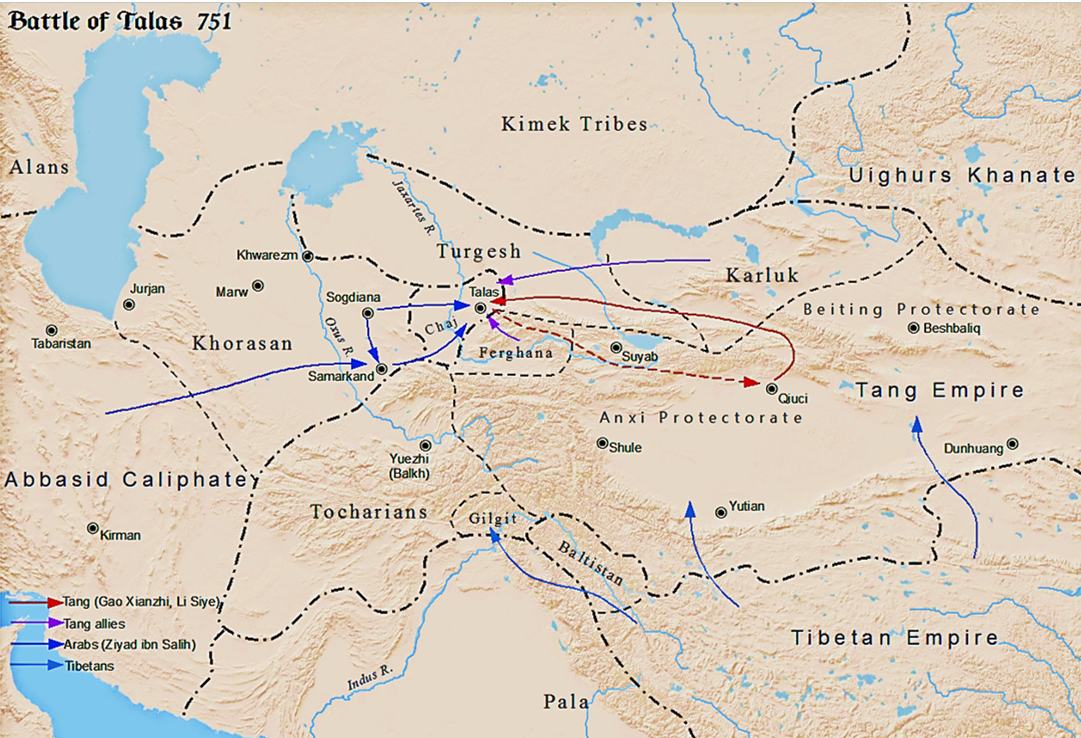
Battle of Talas between Tang dynasty and Abbasid Caliphate c. 751

Fortunately, one of Yang's most respectable advisors, Li Yuan, was able to claim the throne quickly, preventing a chaotic collapse. He proclaimed himself Emperor Gaozu, and established the Tang dynasty in 618. The Tang saw expansion of China through conquest to Tibet in the west, Vietnam in the south, and Manchuria in the north. Tang emperors also improved the education of scholars in the Chinese bureaucracy. A Ministry of Rites was established and the examination system was improved to better qualify scholars for their jobs. In addition, Buddhism became popular in China with two different strains between the peasantry and the elite, the Pure Land and Zen strains, respectively. Greatly supporting the spread of Buddhism was Empress Wu, who additionally claimed an unofficial "Zhou dynasty" and displayed China's tolerance of a woman ruler, which was rare at the time. However, Buddhism would also experience some backlash, especially from Confucianists and Taoists. This would usually involve criticism about how it was costing the state money, since the government was unable to tax Buddhist monasteries, and additionally sent many grants and gifts to them.

The Tang dynasty began to decline under the rule of Emperor Xuanzong, who began to neglect the economy and military and caused unrest amongst the court officials due to the excessive influence of his concubine, Yang Guifei, and her family. This eventually sparked a revolt in 755. Although the revolt failed, subduing it required involvement with the unruly nomadic tribes outside of China and distributing more power to local leaders—leaving the government and economy in a degraded state. The Tang dynasty officially ended in 907 and various factions led by the aforementioned nomadic tribes and local leaders would fight for control of China in the Five Dynasties and Ten Kingdoms period.

==== Mongol Empire ====
The Mongol Empire was the largest contiguous land empire in history. Founded by Genghis Khan in 1206 after the unification of separate Mongol tribes, it rapidly expanded across Asia and into Europe. The Mongol conquests became known for both their military effectiveness and large-scale destruction. The era of Pax Mongolica facilitated trade, cultural exchange, and communication throughout Eurasia.

Expansion of the Mongol Empire 1206–1294

===== Liao, Song and Jin dynasties =====
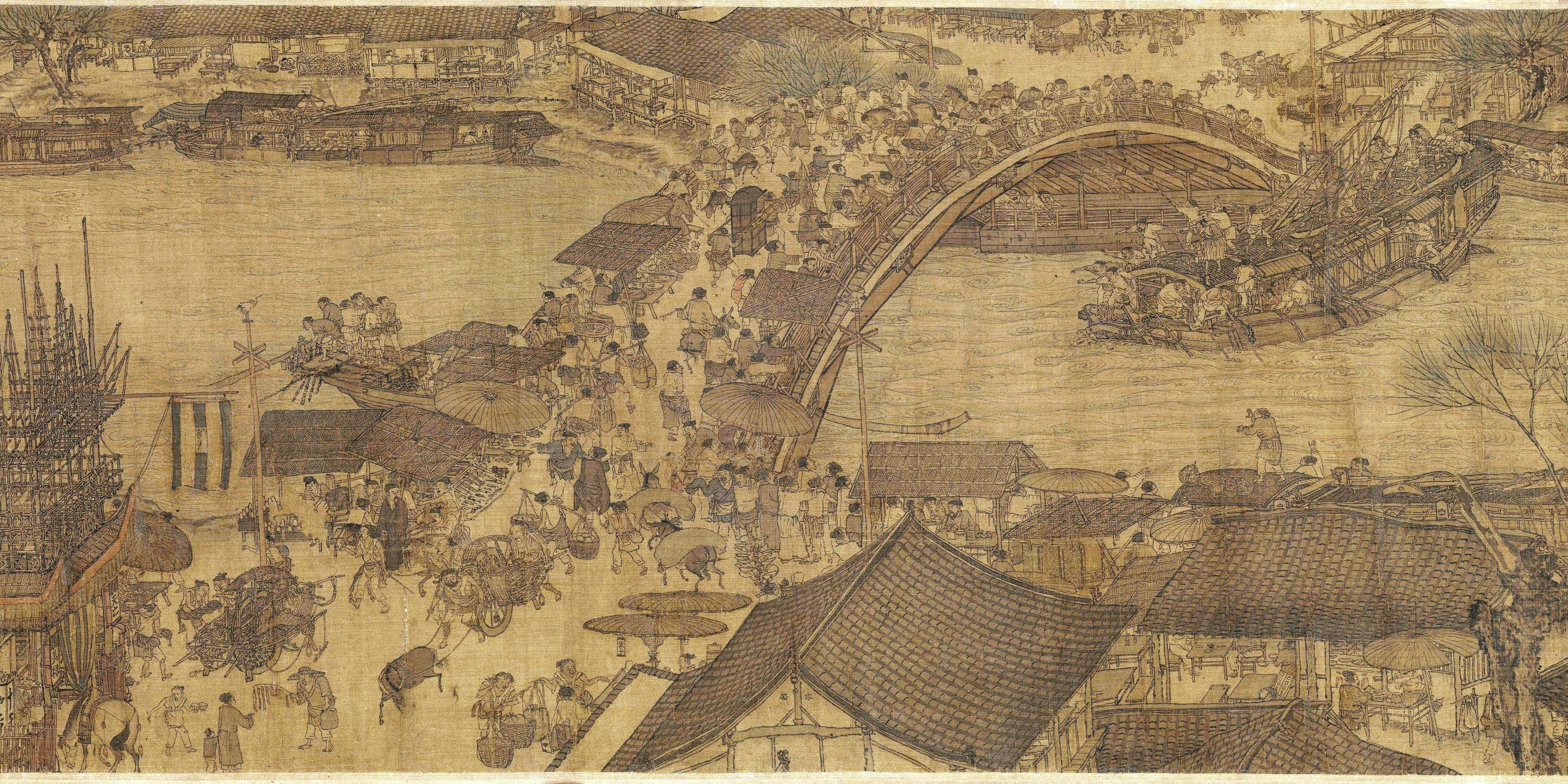
Daily life of people from the Song period at the capital, Bianjing, today's Kaifeng

By 960, most of China proper had been reunited under the Song dynasty, although it lost territories in the north and could not defeat one of the nomadic tribes there—the Liao dynasty of the highly sinicized Khitan people. From then on, the Song would have to pay tribute to avoid invasion and thus set the precedent for other nomadic kingdoms to oppress them. The Song also saw the revival of Confucianism in the form of Neo-Confucianism. This had the effect of putting the Confucian scholars at a higher status than aristocrats or Buddhists and also intensified the reduction of power in women. The infamous practice of foot binding developed in this period as a result. Eventually the Liao dynasty in the north was overthrown by the Jin dynasty of the Manchu-related Jurchen people. The new Jin kingdom invaded northern China, leaving the Song to flee farther south and creating the Southern Song dynasty in 1126. There, cultural life flourished.

===== Yuan dynasty =====
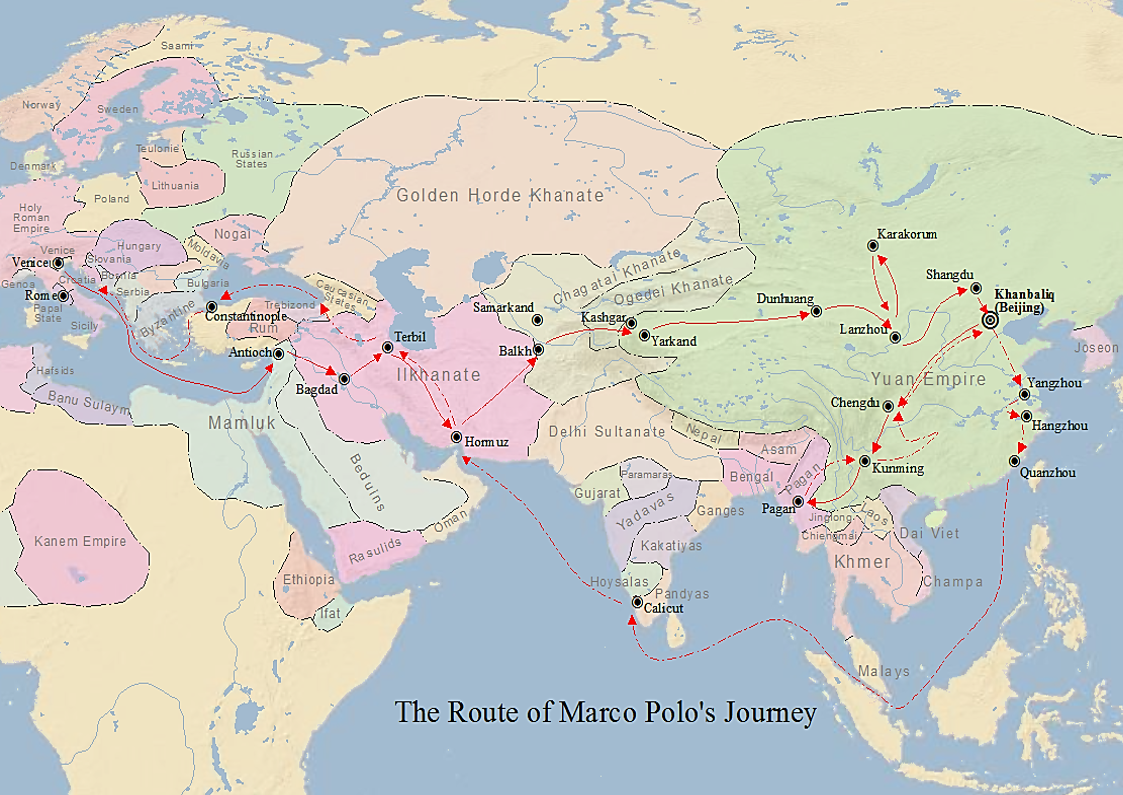
Map of Marco Polo's travels

By 1227, the Mongols had conquered the Western Xia kingdom northwest of China. Soon the Mongols incurred upon the Jin empire of the Jurchens. Chinese cities were soon besieged by the Mongol hordes that showed little mercy for those who resisted and the Southern Song Chinese were quickly losing territory. In 1271 the current Great Khan, Kublai Khan, claimed himself Emperor of China and officially established the Yuan dynasty. By 1290, all of China was under control of the Mongols, marking the first time they were ever completely conquered by a foreign invader; the new capital was established at Khanbaliq (modern-day Beijing). Kublai Khan segregated Mongol culture from Chinese culture by discouraging interactions between the two peoples, separating living spaces and places of worship, and reserving top administrative positions to Mongols, thus preventing Confucian scholars to continue the bureaucratic system. Nevertheless, Kublai remained fascinated with Chinese thinking, surrounding himself with Chinese Buddhist, Taoist, or Confucian advisors.

Mongol women displayed a contrasting independent nature compared to the Chinese women who continued to be suppressed. Mongol women often rode out on hunts or even to war. Kublai's wife, Chabi, was a perfect example of this; Chabi advised her husband on several political and diplomatic matters; she convinced him that the Chinese were to be respected and well-treated in order to make them easier to rule. However, this was not enough to affect Chinese women's position, and the increasingly Neo-Confucian successors of Kublai further repressed Chinese and even Mongol women.

The Black Death, which would later ravage Western Europe, had its beginnings in Asia, where it wiped out large populations in China in 1331.

==== Japan ====
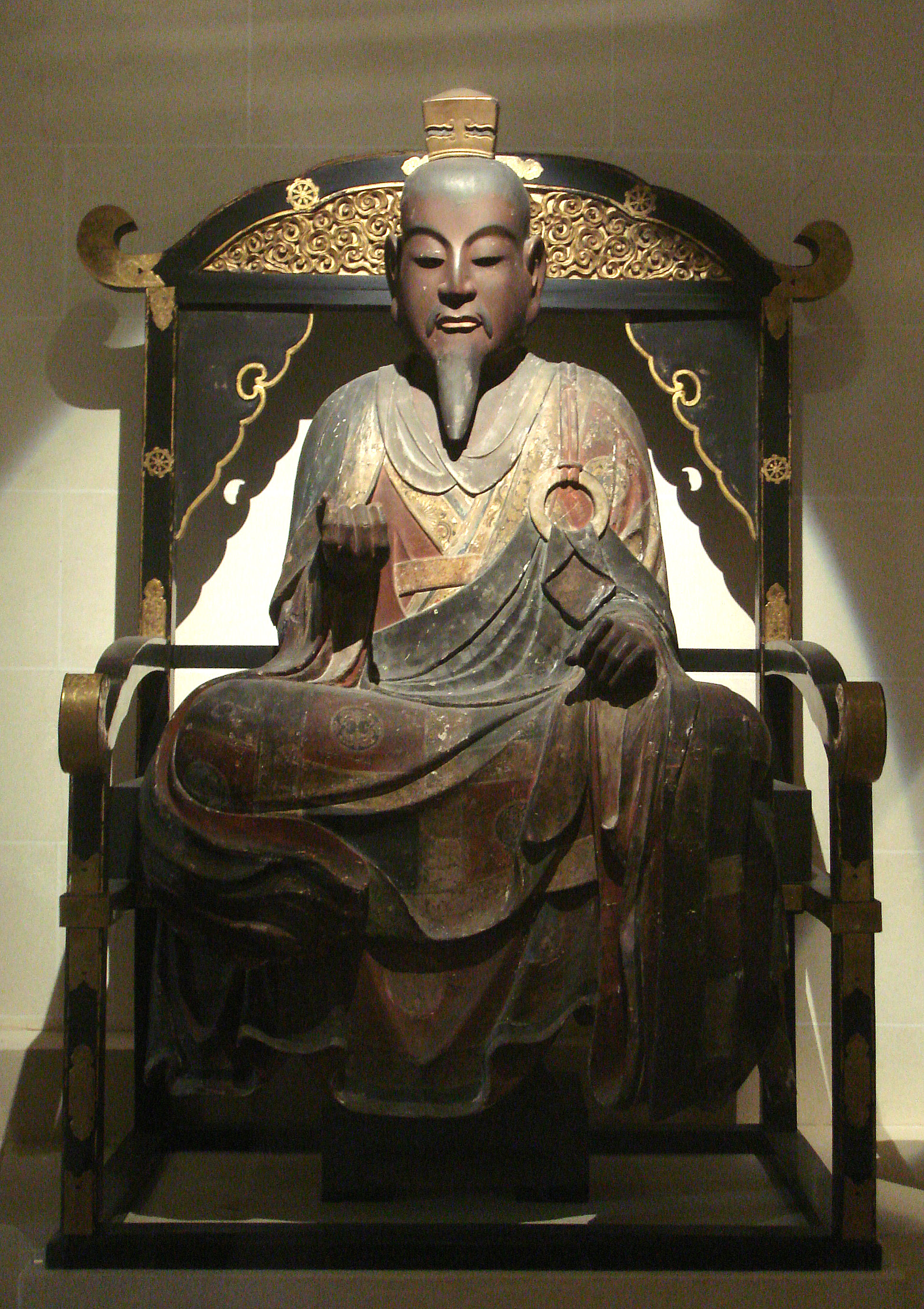
Sculpture of Prince Shōtoku

===== Asuka period =====
Japan's medieval history began with the Asuka period, from around 600 to 710. The time was characterized by the Taika Reform and imperial centralization, both of which were a direct result of growing Chinese contact and influences. In 603, Prince Shōtoku of the Yamato dynasty began significant political and cultural changes. He issued the Seventeen-article constitution in 604, centralizing power towards the emperor (under the title tenno, or heavenly sovereign) and removing the power to levy taxes from provincial lords. Shōtoku was also a patron of Buddhism and he encouraged building temples competitively.

===== Nara period =====
Shōtoku's reforms transitioned Japan to the Nara period (c. 710 to c. 794), with the moving of the Japanese capital to Nara in Honshu. This period saw the culmination of Chinese-style writing, etiquette, and architecture in Japan along with Confucian ideals to supplement the already present Buddhism. Peasants revered both Confucian scholars and Buddhist monks. However, in the wake of the 735–737 Japanese smallpox epidemic, Buddhism gained the status of state religion and the government ordered the construction of numerous Buddhist temples, monasteries, and statues. The lavish spending combined with the fact that many aristocrats did not pay taxes, put a heavy burden on peasantry that caused poverty and famine. Eventually the Buddhist position got out of control, threatening to seize imperial power and causing Emperor Kanmu to move the capital to Heian-kyō to avoid a Buddhist takeover. This marked the beginning of the Heian period and the end of Taika reform.

===== Heian period =====
With the Heian period (from 794 to 1185) came a decline of imperial power. Chinese influence also declined, as a result of its correlation with imperial centralization and the heavenly mandate, which came to be regarded as ineffective. By 838, the Japanese court discontinued its embassies in China; only traders and Buddhist monks continued to travel to China. Buddhism itself came to be considered more Japanese than Chinese, and persisted to be popular in Japan. Buddhists monks and monasteries continued their attempts to gather personal power in courts, along with aristocrats. One particular noble family that dominated influence in the imperial bureaucracy was the Fujiwara clan. During this time cultural life in the imperial court flourished. There was a focus on beauty and social interaction and writing and literature was considered refined. Noblewomen were cultured the same as noblemen, dabbling in creative works and politics. A prime example of both Japanese literature and women's role in high-class culture at this time was The Tale of Genji, written by the lady-in-waiting Murasaki Shikibu. Popularization of wooden palaces and shōji sliding doors amongst the nobility also occurred.

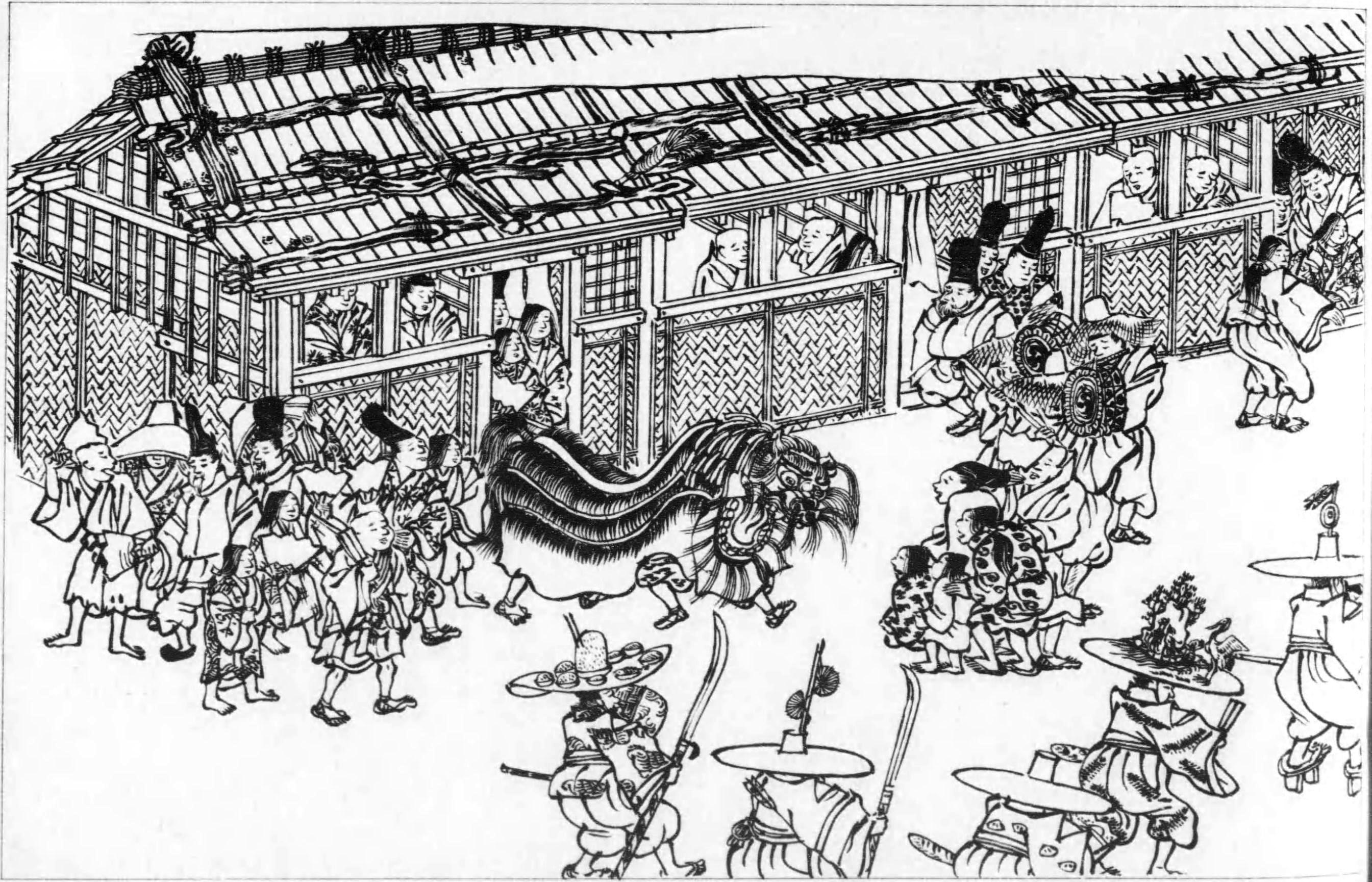
Machiya in Heian period

Loss of imperial power also led to the rise of provincial warrior elites. Small lords began to function independently. They administered laws, supervised public works projects, and collected revenue for themselves instead of the imperial court. Regional lords also began to build their own armies. These warriors were loyal only their local lords and not the emperor, although the imperial government increasingly called them in to protect the capital. The regional warrior class developed into the samurai, which created its own culture: including specialized weapons such as the katana and a form of chivalry, bushido. The imperial government's loss of control in the second half of the Heian period allowed banditry to grow, requiring both feudal lords and Buddhist monasteries to procure warriors for protection. As imperial control over Japan declined, feudal lords also became more independent and seceded from the empire. These feudal states squandered the peasants living in them, reducing the farmers to an almost serfdom status. Peasants were also rigidly restricted from rising to the samurai class, being physically set off by dress and weapon restrictions. As a result of their oppression, many peasants turned to Buddhism as a hope for reward in the afterlife for upright behavior.

With the increase of feudalism, families in the imperial court began to depend on alliances with regional lords. The Fujiwara clan declined from power, replaced by a rivalry between the Taira clan and the Minamoto clan. This rivalry grew into the Genpei War in the early 1180s. This war saw the use of both samurai and peasant soldiers. For the samurai, battle was ritual and they often easily cut down the poorly trained peasantry. The Minamoto clan proved successful due to their rural alliances. Once the Taira was destroyed, the Minamoto established a military government called the shogunate (or bakufu), centered in Kamakura.

===== Kamakura period =====
The end of the Genpei War and the establishment of the Kamakura shogunate marked the end of the Heian period and the beginning of the Kamakura period in 1185, solidifying feudal Japan with an emphasis on military feudalism through the daimyo system.

==== Korea ====
===== Three Kingdoms of Korea =====
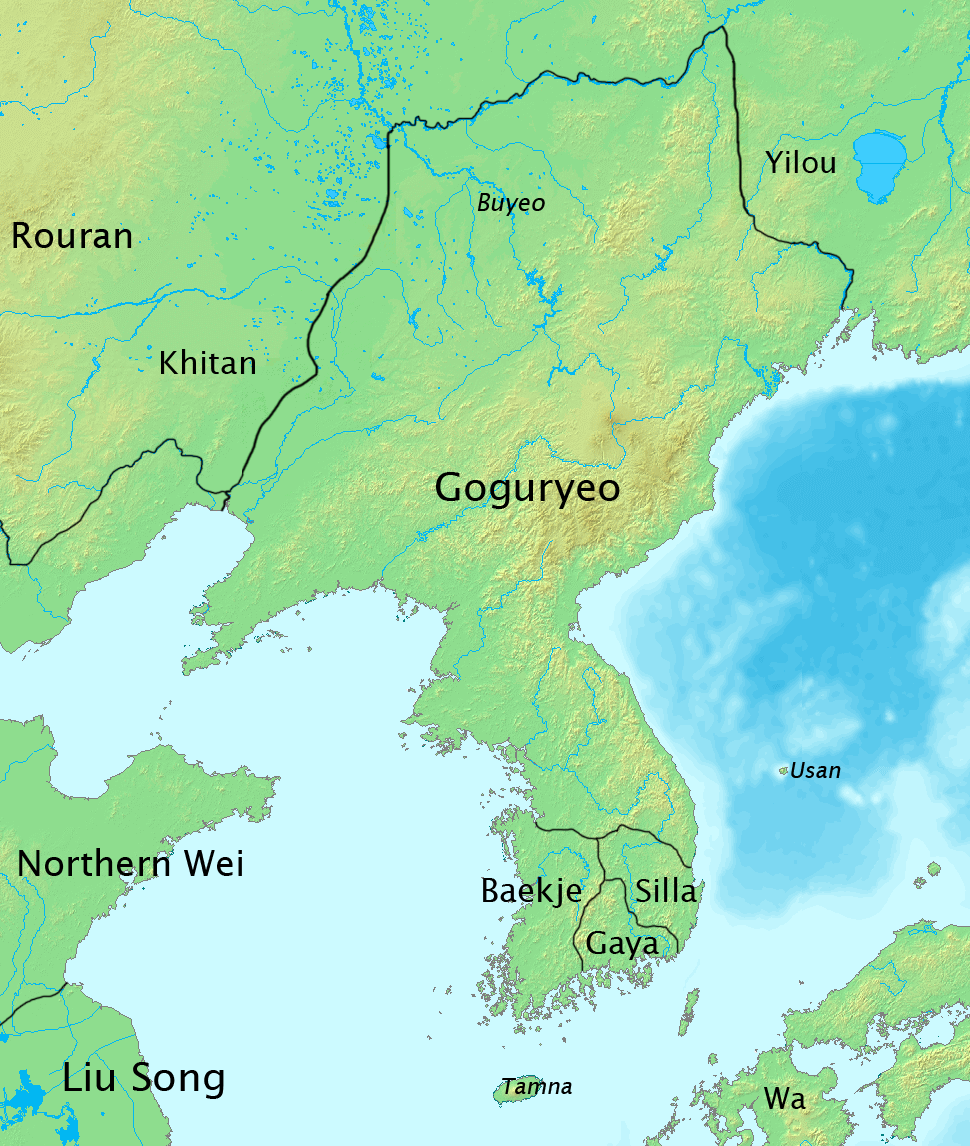
Korean peninsula in 476 AD. There are three kingdoms and Gaya Union in the picture. This picture shows the heyday of Goguryeo.

The three Kingdoms of Korea involves Goguryeo in north, Baekje in southwest, and Silla in southeast Korean peninsula. These three kingdoms act as a bridge of cultures between China and Japan. Prince Shōtoku of Japan had been taught by two teachers. One was from Baekje, the other was from Goguryeo. Once Japan invaded Silla, Goguryeo helped Silla to defeat Japan. Baekje met the earliest heyday of them. Its heyday was the 5th century AD. Its capital was Seoul. During its heyday, the kingdom made colonies overseas. Liaodong, China and Kyushu, Japan were the colonies of Baekje during its short heyday. Goguryeo was the strongest kingdom of all. They sometimes called themselves as an Empire. Its heyday was 6th century. King Gwanggaeto widened its territory to north. So Goguryeo dominated from Korean peninsula to Manchuria. And his son, King Jangsu widened its territory to south. He occupied Seoul, and moved its capital to Pyeongyang. Goguryeo almost occupied three quarters of South Korean peninsula thanks to king Jangsu who widened the kingdom's territory to south. Silla met the latest heyday. King Jinheung went north and occupied Seoul. But it was short. Baekje became stronger and attacked Silla. Baekje occupied more than 40 cities of Silla. So Silla could hardly survive. China's Sui dynasty invaded Goguryeo and Goguryeo–Sui War occurred between Korea and China. Goguryeo won against China and Sui dynasty fell. After then, Tang dynasty reinvaded Goguryeo and helped Silla to unify the peninsula. Goguryeo, Baekje, and Japan helped each other against Tang-Silla alliance, but Baekje and Goguryeo fell. Tang dynasty betrayed Silla and invaded Korean peninsula in order to occupy the whole Korean peninsula (Silla-Tang war). Silla advocated 'Unification of Three Korea', so people of fallen Baekje and Goguryeo helped Silla against Chinese invasion. Eventually Silla could beat China and unified the peninsula. This war helped Korean people to unite mentally.

===== North-South States Period =====
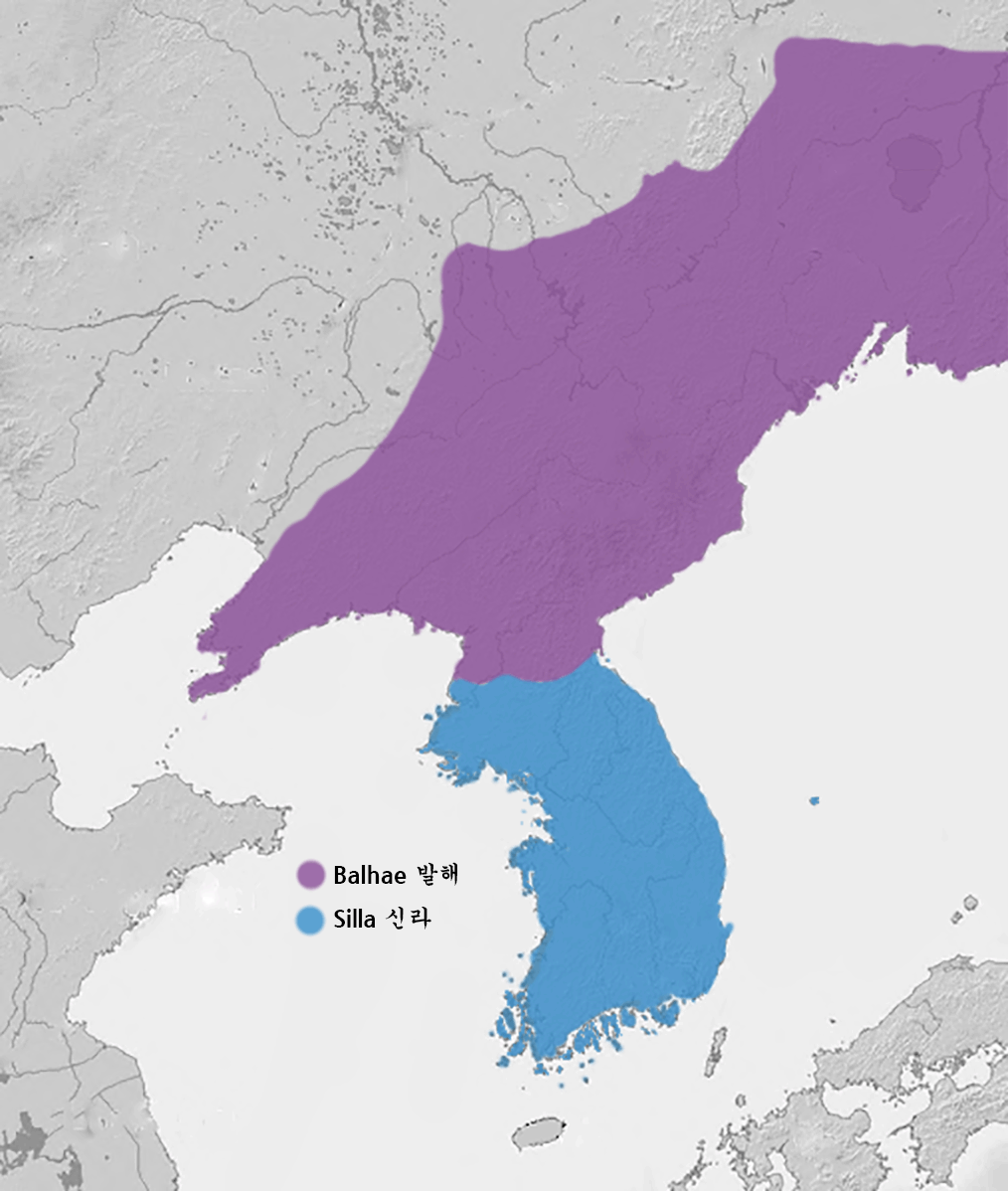
Balhae in the north, Later Silla in the south.

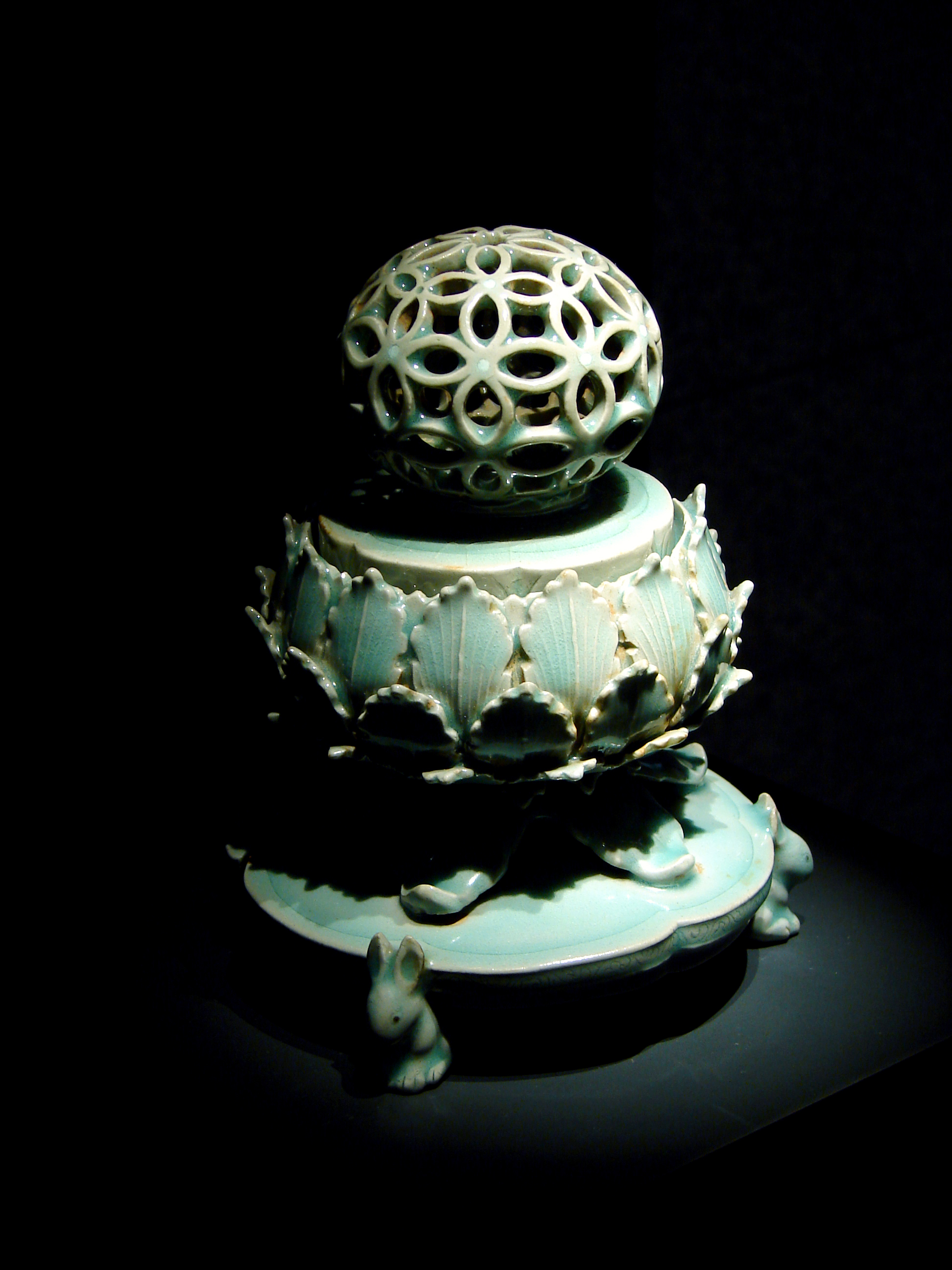
the Goryeo ware, which shows splendid culture of Goryeo in mediaeval Korea.

The rest of Goguryeo people established Balhae and won the war against Tang in later 7th century AD. Balhae is the north state, and Later Silla was the south state. Balhae was a quite strong kingdom as their ancestor Goguryeo did. Finally, the Emperor of Tang dynasty admits Balhae as 'A strong country in the East'. They liked to trade with Japan, China, and Silla. Balhae and Later Silla sent a lot of international students to China. And Arabian merchants came into Korean peninsula, so Korea became known as 'Silla' in the western countries. Silla improved Korean writing system called Idu letters. Idu affected Katakana of Japan. Liao dynasty invaded Balhae in early 10th century, so Balhae fell.

===== Later Three Kingdoms of Korea =====
The unified Korean kingdom, Later Silla divided into three kingdoms again because of the corrupt central government. It involves Later Goguryeo (also as known as "Taebong"), Later Baekje, and Later Silla. The general of Later Goguryeo, Wang Geon took the throne and changed the name of kingdom into Goryeo, which was derived by the ancient strong kingdom, Goguryeo, and Goryeo reunified the peninsula.

===== Goryeo =====
Goryeo reunited the Korean peninsula during the later three kingdoms period and named itself as 'Empire'. But nowadays, Goryeo is known as a kingdom. The name 'Goryeo' was derived from Goguryeo, and the name Korea was derived from Goryeo. Goryeo adopted people from fallen Balhae. They also widened their territory to north by defending Liao dynasty and attacking the Jurchen people. Goryeo developed a splendid culture. The first metal type printed book Jikji was also from Korea. The Goryeo ware is one of the most famous legacies of this kingdom. Goryeo imported Chinese government system and developed into their own ways.

During this period, laws were codified and a civil service system was introduced. Buddhism flourished and spread throughout the peninsula. The Tripitaka Koreana is 81,258 books total. It was made to keep Korea safe against the Mongolian invasion. It is now a UNESCO world heritage. Goryeo won the battle against Liao dynasty. Then, the Mongol Empire invaded Goryeo. Goryeo did not disappear but it had to obey Mongolians. After 80 years, in 14th century, the Mongolian dynasty Yuan lost power, King Gongmin tried to free themselves against Mongol although his wife was also Mongolian. At the 14th century, Ming dynasty wanted Goryeo to obey China. But Goryeo didn't. They decided to invade China. Going to China, the general of Goryeo, Lee Sung-Gae came back and destroyed Goryeo. Then, in 1392, he established new dynasty, Joseon. And he became Taejo of Joseon, which means the first king of Joseon.

=== Southeast Asia ===
==== Khmers ====
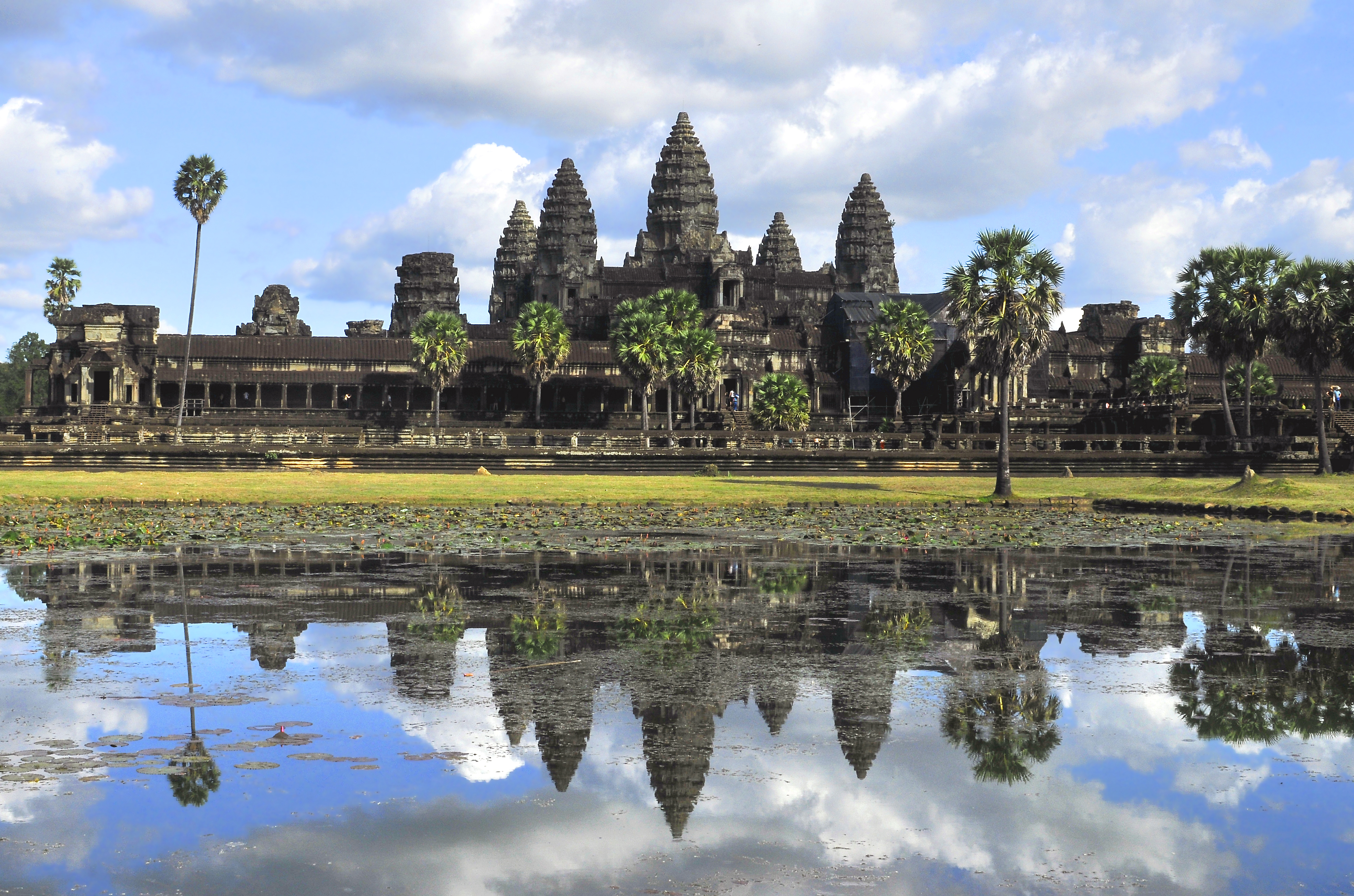
The Hindu-Buddhist temple of Angkor Wat.

In 802, Jayavarman II consolidated his rule over neighboring peoples and declared himself chakravartin, or "universal ruler". The Khmer Empire effectively dominated all mainland Southeast Asia from the early 9th until the 15th century, during which time they developed a sophisticated monumental architecture of most exquisite expression and mastery of composition at Angkor.

==== Vietnam ====
The history of Vietnam can be traced back to around 20,000 years ago, as the first modern humans arrived and settled on this land, known as the Hoabinhians, which can be traced back to the modern-day Negritos. Archaeological findings from 1965, which are still under research, show the remains of two hominins closely related to the Sinanthropus, dating as far back as the Middle Pleistocene era, roughly half a million years ago.

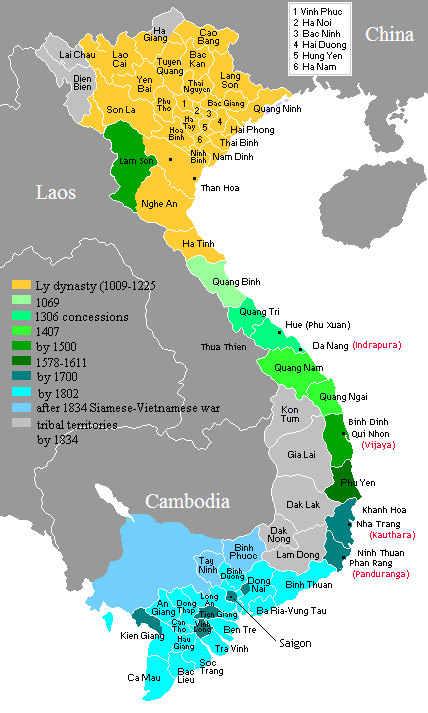
Map of Vietnam showing the conquest of the south (the Nam tiến, 1069–1757).

Pre-historic Vietnam was home to some of the world's earliest civilizations and societies—making them one of the world's first people who had practiced agriculture. The Red River valley formed a natural geographic and economic unit, bounded to the north and west by mountains and jungles, to the east by the sea and to the south by the Red River Delta. The need to have a single authority to prevent floods of the Red River, to cooperate in constructing hydraulic systems, trade exchange, and to repel invaders, led to the creation of the first legendary Vietnamese states approximately 2879 BC. While in the later times, ongoing research from archaeologists have suggested that the Vietnamese Đông Sơn culture were traceable back to Northern Vietnam, Guangxi and Laos around 700 BC.

Vietnam's long coastal and narrowed lands, rugged mountainous terrains, with two major deltas, were soon home to several different ancient cultures and civilizations. In the north, the Đông Sơn culture and its indigenous chiefdoms of Văn Lang and Âu Lạc started to flourish by 500 BC. In Central, Sa Huỳnh culture of Austronesian Chamic peoples also thrived. Both were swept by the Chinese Han dynasty expansion from the north – the Han conquest of Nanyue brought parts of Vietnam under the Chinese rule in 111 BC. Traditional Chinese became the official script as well as the later developed independent Nôm script of Vietnamese.

In 40 AD, the Trưng Sisters led the first uprising of indigenous tribes and peoples against Chinese domination. The rebellion was however defeated, but as the Han dynasty began to weaken by late 2nd century and China (中国) started to descend into state of turmoil, the indigenous peoples of Vietnam rose again and some became free. In 192 AD, the Chams of Central Vietnam revolted against the Chinese and subsequently became independent Kingdom of Champa, while the Red River Delta saw loosening Northern control. At that time, with the introduction of Buddhism and Hinduism by the second century AD, Vietnam was the first place in Southeast Asia which shared influences of both Indian and Chinese cultures, and the rise of first Indianized kingdoms Champa and Funan.

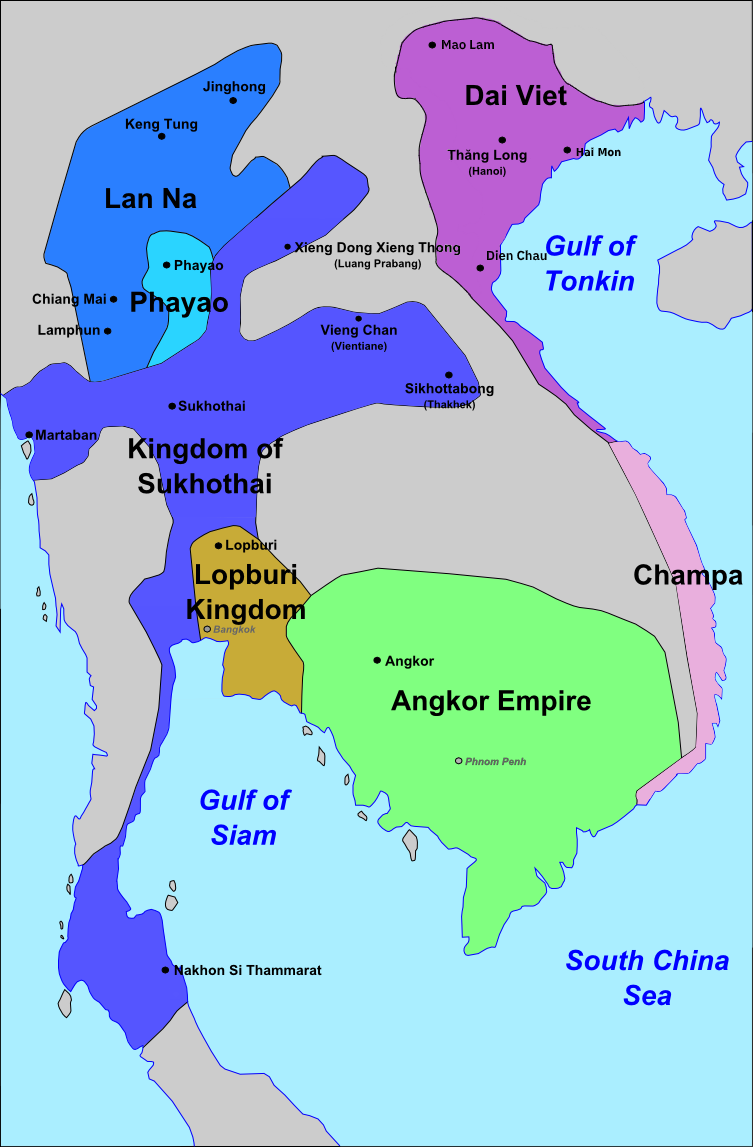
Đại Việt, Champa, Angkor Empire and their neighbours, late 13th century

During these 1,000 years there were many uprisings against Chinese domination, and at certain periods Vietnam was independently governed under the Trưng Sisters, Early Lý, Khúc and Dương Đình Nghệ—although their triumphs and reigns were temporary.

When Ngô Quyền (Emperor of Vietnam, 938–944) restored sovereign power in the country with the victory at Battle of Bạch Đằng (938), the next millennium was advanced by the accomplishments of successive local dynasties: Ngô, Đinh, Early Lê, Lý, Trần, Hồ, Later Trần, Later Lê, Mạc, Revival Lê, Tây Sơn and Nguyễn. Nôm script (Chữ Nôm) of the Vietnamese started to develop and become more sophisticated, with literature being published and written in Nôm. At various points during the imperial dynasties, Vietnam was ravaged and divided by civil wars and witnessed interventions by the Song, Yuan, Cham, Ming, Siamese, Qing, French, and Empire of Japan.

The Ming Empire conquered the Red River valley for a while before native Vietnamese regained control and the French Empire reduced Vietnam to a French dependency for nearly a century, followed by brief but brutal occupation by the Japanese Empire. During the French period, widespread brutality, inequality and cultural remnants of Hán-Nôm were being destroyed, with the French wishing to rid the Vietnamese of their Confucian legacy from the 1880s. French was the official language during this period. The Vietnamese Latin script, seen to be a Latin transliteration of Hán-Nôm, superseded the Hán-Nôm logographic scripts and became the main mode of written as well as spoken language since the 20th century.

Japan invaded in 1940, creating deep resentment that fuelled resistance to post-World War II military-political efforts by the returning power of France, and the United States who had viewed themselves as fighters for liberty and democracy against the red waves of communism. In the Vietnam War, the United States or the Western Bloc supported South Vietnam and the Soviet Union or the Eastern Bloc supported North Vietnam. Political upheaval, a period of intense fighting and war, followed by Communist insurrection and victory further put an end to the monarchy after World War II, and the country was proclaimed a Socialist Republic. Vietnam suffered heavy sanctions as well as political and economic isolation following brutal wars with China and Cambodia in the successive years. Following that era, the Đổi Mới (renovation/innovation) reformations were enacted. The forces of market liberalisation and globalisation has shaped Vietnam's economic and political circumstances since.

== Early modern ==
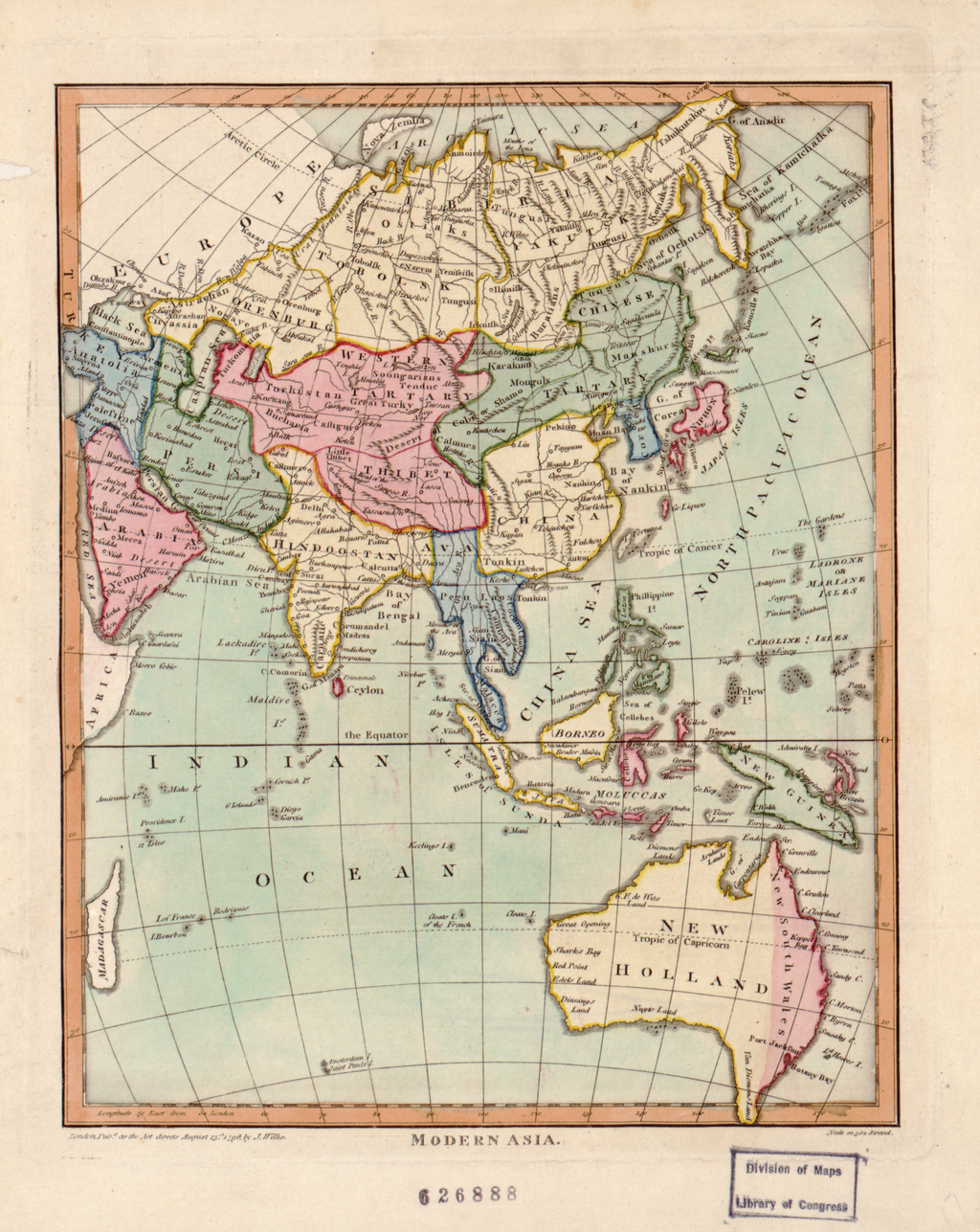
A 1796 map of Asia (or the "Eastern world"), which also included the continent of Australia (then known as New Holland) within its realm.

The Russian Empire began to expand into Asia from the 17th century, and would eventually take control of all of Siberia and most of Central Asia by the end of the 19th century. The Ottoman Empire controlled Anatolia, the Middle East, North Africa and the Balkans from the 16th century onwards. In the 17th century, the Manchu conquered China and established the Qing dynasty. In the 16th century, the Mughal Empire controlled much of India and initiated the second golden age for India. China was the largest economy in the world for much of the time, followed by India until the 18th century.

=== Ming China ===
By 1368, Zhu Yuanzhang had claimed himself Hongwu Emperor and established the Ming dynasty of China. Immediately, the new emperor and his followers drove the Mongols and their culture out of China and beyond the Great Wall. The new emperor was somewhat suspicious of the scholars that dominated China's bureaucracy, for he had been born a peasant and was uneducated. Nevertheless, Confucian scholars were necessary to China's bureaucracy and were reestablished as well as reforms that would improve the exam systems and make them more important in entering the bureaucracy than ever before. The exams became more rigorous, cut down harshly on cheating, and those who excelled were more highly appraised. Finally, Hongwu also directed more power towards the role of emperor so as to end the corrupt influences of the bureaucrats.

==== Society and economy ====
The Hongwu emperor, perhaps for his sympathy of the common-folk, had built many irrigation systems and other public projects that provided help for the peasant farmers. They were also allowed to cultivate and claim unoccupied land without having to pay any taxes and labor demands were lowered. However, none of this was able to stop the rising landlord class that gained many privileges from the government and slowly gained control of the peasantry. Moneylenders foreclosed on peasant debt in exchange for mortgages and bought up farmer land, forcing them to become the landlords' tenants or to wander elsewhere for work. Also during this time, Neo-Confucianism intensified even more than the previous two dynasties (the Song and Yuan). Focus on the superiority of elders over youth, men over women, and teachers over students resulted in minor discrimination of the "inferior" classes. The fine arts grew in the Ming era, with improved techniques in brush painting that depicted scenes of court, city or country life; people such as scholars or travelers; or the beauty of mountains, lakes, or marshes. The Chinese novel fully developed in this era, with such classics written such as Water Margin, Journey to the West, and Jin Ping Mei.

Economics grew rapidly in the Ming dynasty as well. The introduction of American crops such as maize, sweet potatoes, and peanuts allowed for cultivation of crops in infertile land and helped prevent famine. The population boom that began in the Song dynasty accelerated until China's population went from 80 or 90 million to 150 million in three centuries, culminating in 1600. This paralleled the market economy that was growing both internally and externally. Silk, tea, ceramics, and lacquer-ware were produced by artisans that traded them in Asia and to Europeans. Westerners began to trade (with some Chinese-assigned limits), primarily in the port-towns of Macau and Canton. Although merchants benefited greatly from this, land remained the primary symbol of wealth in China and traders' riches were often put into acquiring more land. Therefore, little of these riches were used in private enterprises that could've allowed for China to develop the market economy that often accompanied the highly-successful Western countries.

==== Foreign interests ====
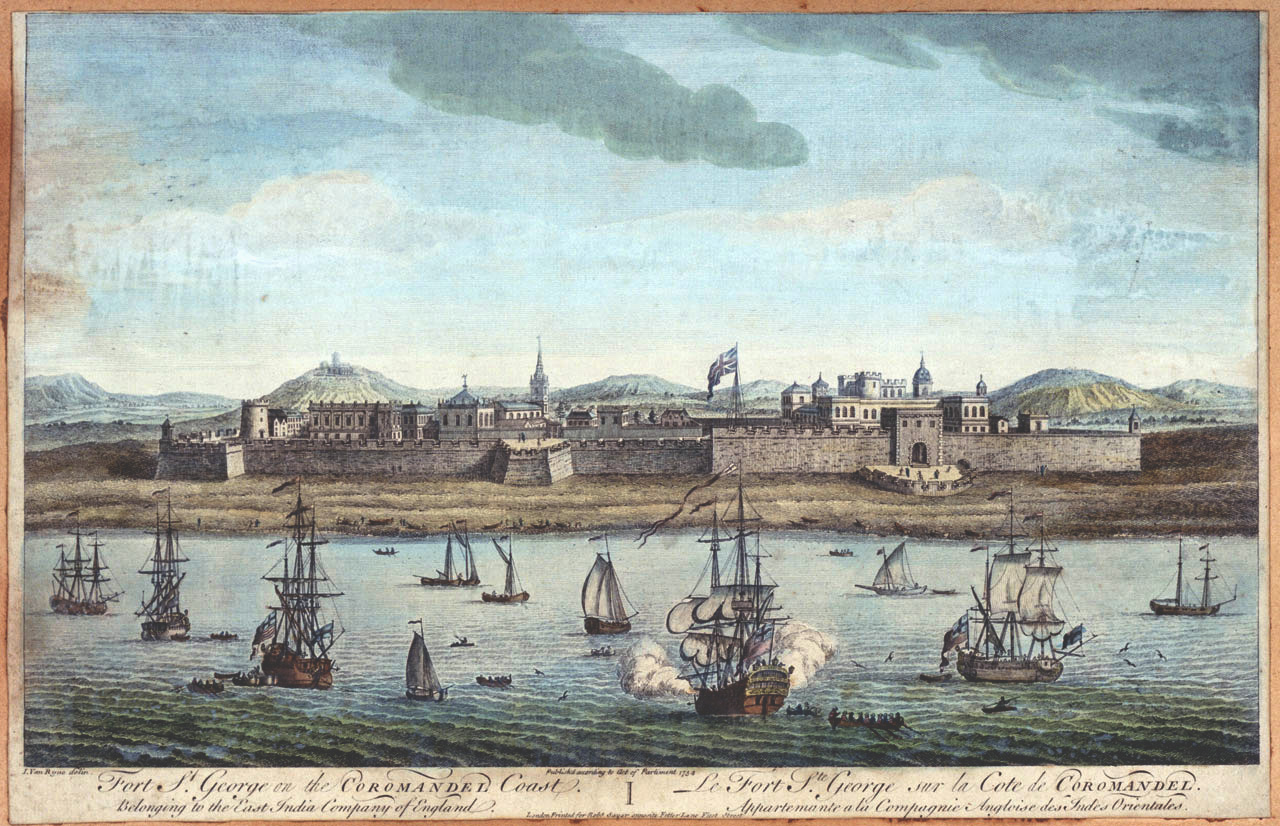
A view of the Fort St George in 18th-century Madras.

In the interest of national glory, the Chinese began sending impressive junk ships across the South China Sea and the Indian Ocean. From 1403 to 1433, the Yongle Emperor commissioned expeditions led by the admiral Zheng He, a Muslim eunuch from China. Chinese junks carrying hundreds of soldiers, goods, and animals for zoos, traveled to Southeast Asia, Persia, southern Arabia, and east Africa to show off Chinese power. Their prowess exceeded that of current Europeans at the time, and had these expeditions not ended, the world economy may be different from today. In 1433, the Chinese government decided that the cost of a navy was an unnecessary expense. The Chinese navy was slowly dismantled and focus on interior reform and military defense began. It was China's longstanding priority that they protect themselves from nomads and they have accordingly returned to it. The growing limits on the Chinese navy would leave them vulnerable to foreign invasion by sea later on.

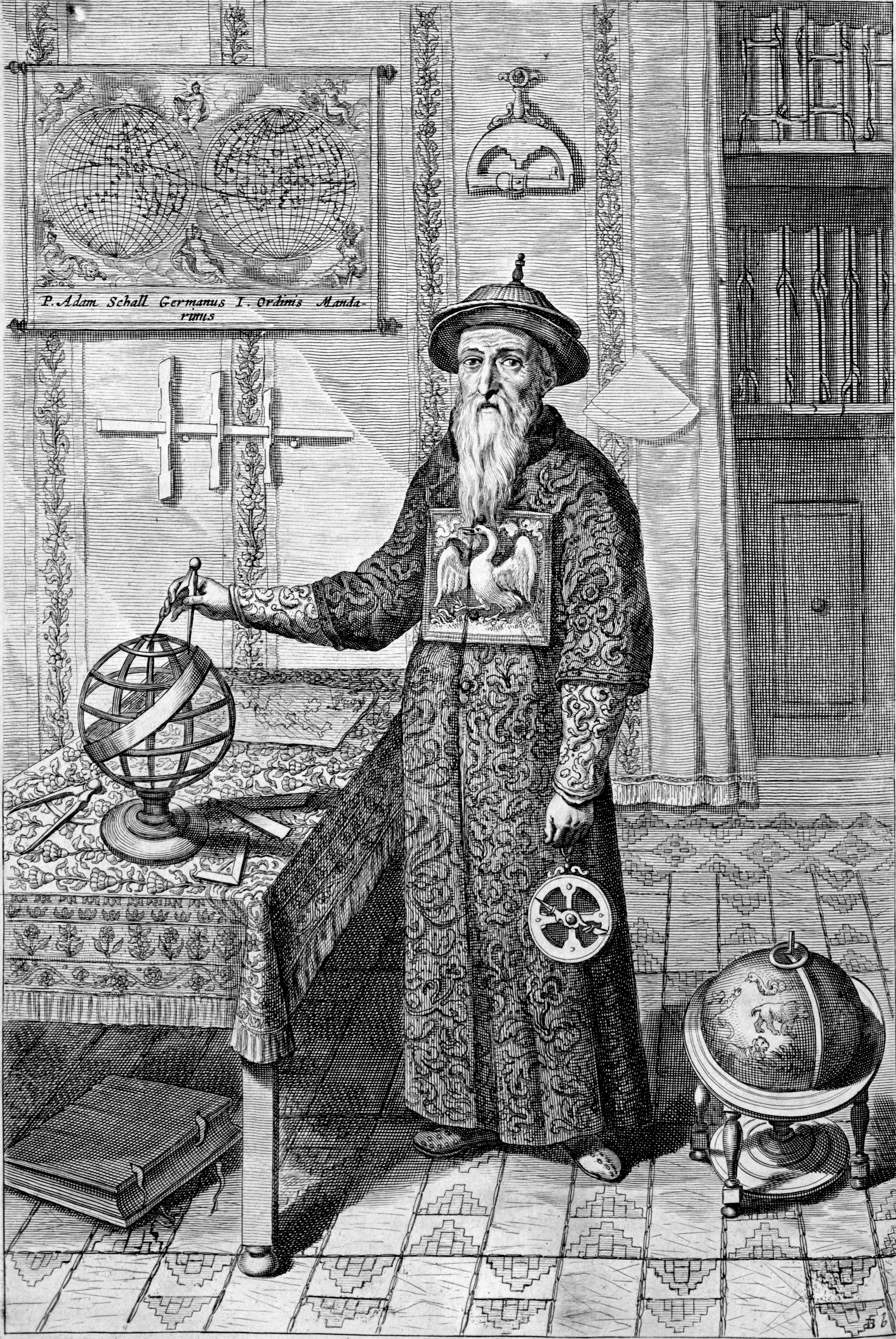
Here a Jesuit, Adam Schall von Bell (1592–1666), is dressed as an official of the Chinese Department of Astronomy.

As was inevitable, Westerners arrived on the Chinese east coast, primarily Jesuit missionaries which reached the mainland in 1582. They attempted to convert the Chinese people to Christianity by first converting the top of the social hierarchy and allowing the lower classes to subsequently convert. To further gain support, many Jesuits adopted Chinese dress, customs, and language. Some Chinese scholars were interested in certain Western teachings and especially in Western technology. By the 1580s, Jesuit scholars like Matteo Ricci and Adam Schall amazed the Chinese elite with technological advances such as European clocks, improved calendars and cannons, and the accurate prediction of eclipses. Although some the scholar-gentry converted, many were suspicious of the Westerners whom they called "barbarians" and even resented them for the embarrassment they received at the hand of Western correction. Nevertheless, a small group of Jesuit scholars remained at the court to impress the emperor and his advisors.

==== Decline ====
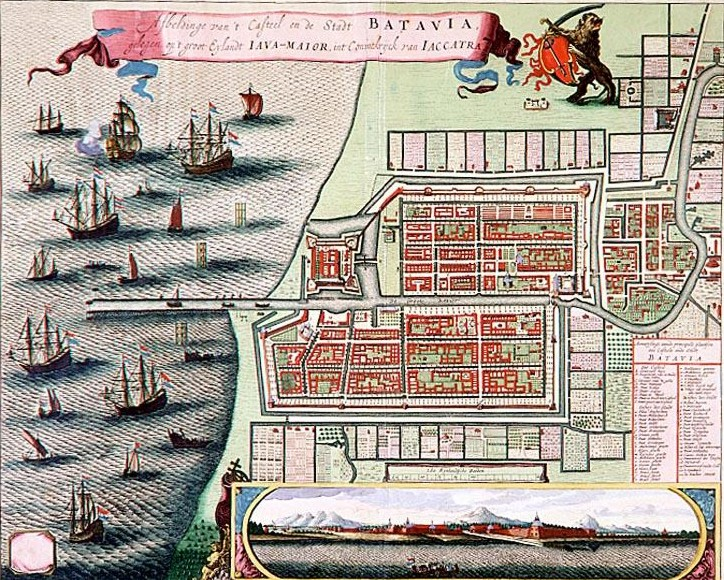
Dutch Batavia in the 17th century, built in what is now North Jakarta

Near the end of the 1500s, the extremely centralized government that gave so much power to the emperor had begun to fail as more incompetent rulers took the mantle. Along with these weak rulers came increasingly corrupt officials who took advantage of the decline. Once more the public projects fell into disrepair due to neglect by the bureaucracy and resulted in floods, drought, and famine that rocked the peasantry. The famine soon became so terrible that some peasants resorted to selling their children to slavery to save them from starvation, or to eating bark, the feces of geese, or other people. Many landlords abused the situation by building large estates where desperate farmers would work and be exploited. In turn, many of these farmers resorted to flight, banditry, and open rebellion.

The Qing conquest of the Ming and expansion of the empire

All of this corresponded with the usual dynastic decline of China seen before, as well as the growing foreign threats. In the mid-16th century, Japanese and ethnic Chinese pirates began to raid the southern coast, and neither the bureaucracy nor the military were able to stop them. The threat of the northern Manchu people also grew. The Manchu were an already large state north of China, when in the early 17th century a local leader named Nurhaci suddenly united them under the Eight Banners—armies that the opposing families were organized into. The Manchus adopted many Chinese customs, specifically taking after their bureaucracy. Nevertheless, the Manchus still remained a Chinese vassal. In 1644 Chinese administration became so weak, the 16th and last emperor, the Chongzhen Emperor, did not respond to the severity of an ensuing rebellion by local dissenters until the enemy had invaded the Forbidden City (his personal estate). He soon hanged himself in the imperial gardens. For a brief amount of time, the Shun dynasty was claimed, until a loyalist Ming official called support from the Manchus to put down the new dynasty. The Shun dynasty ended within a year and the Manchu were now within the Great Wall. Taking advantage of the situation, the Manchus marched on the Chinese capital of Beijing. Within two decades all of China belonged to the Manchu and the Qing dynasty was established.

=== Korea: Joseon dynasty (1392–1897) ===
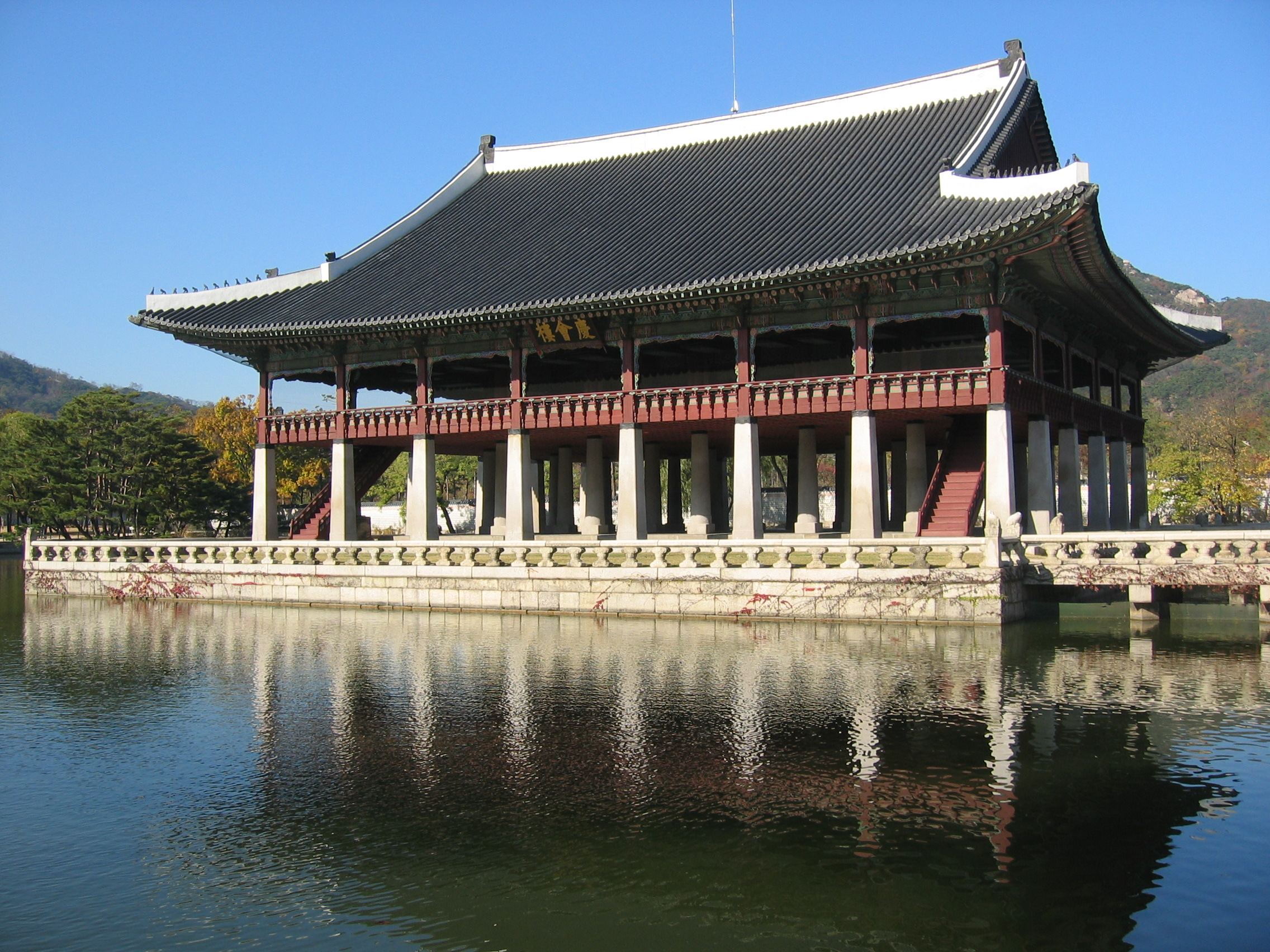
Gyeonghoeru of Gyeongbokgung, the Joseon dynasty's royal palace.

In early-modern Korea, the 500-year-old kingdom, Goryeo fell and the new dynasty Joseon rose in August 5, 1392. Taejo of Joseon changed the country's name from Goryeo to Joseon. Sejong the Great created Hangul, the modern Korean alphabet, in 1443; likewise the Joseon dynasty saw several improvements in science and technology, like Sun Clocks, Water Clocks, Rain-Measuring systems, Star Maps, and detailed records of Korean small villages. The ninth king, Seongjong accomplished the first complete Korean law code in 1485. So the culture and people's lives were improved again.

In 1592, Japan under Toyotomi Hideyoshi invaded Korea in the Imjin War. Before that war, Joseon was in a long peace like Pax Romana. So Joseon was unprepared for the war and faced multiple defeats. The Japanese army conquered Seoul and the whole Korean peninsula was in danger. But Yi Sun-sin, the most renowned Korean general, led 13 ships to victory against the Japanese fleet of 133 ships off the southern coast of Korea. This incredible battle is called "Battle of Myeongnyang". Thereafter, the Ming dynasty helped Joseon, and Japan lost the battle. So Toyotomi Hideyoshi's campaign in Korea failed, and the Tokugawa Shogunate has later began. Korea was hurt a lot at Imjin war. Not long after, the Manchurian people invaded Joseon in the Qing invasion of Joseon. The first invasion was for sake. Because Qing was at war between Ming, so Ming's alliance with Joseon was threatening. And the second invasion was for Joseon to obey Qing. After that, Qing defeated Ming and took the whole Chinese territories. Joseon also had to obey Qing because Joseon lose the second war against Qing.

After the Qing invasion, the princes of the Joseon dynasty lived their childhood in China. The son of King Injo met Adam Schall in Beijing. So he wanted to introduce western technologies to Korean people when he becomes a king. He died before he could take the throne. After then, the alternative prince became the 17th king of the Joseon dynasty, Hyojong, trying to revenge for his kingdom and fallen Ming dynasty to Qing. Later kings such as Yeongjo and Jeongjo tried to improve their people's lives and stop the governors' unreasonable competition. From the 17th century to the 18th century, Joseon sent diplomats and artists to Japan more than 10 times. This group was called 'Tongshinsa'. They were sent to Japan to teach Japan about advanced Korean culture. Japanese people liked to receive poems from Korean nobles. At that time, Korea was more powerful than Japan. But that relationship between Joseon and Japan was reversed after the 19th century. Because Japan became more powerful than Korea and China, either. So Joseon sent diplomats called 'Sooshinsa' to learn Japanese advanced technologies. After king Jeongjo's death, some noble families controlled the whole kingdom in the early 19th century. At the end of that period, Western people invaded Joseon. In 1876, Joseon was set free from Qing so they did not have to obey Qing. But Japanese Empire was happy because Joseon became a perfect independent kingdom. So Japan could intervene in the kingdom more. After this, Joseon traded with the United States and sent 'Sooshinsa' to Japan, 'Youngshinsa' to Qing, and 'Bobingsa' to the US and Europe. These groups took many modern things to the Korean peninsula.

=== Japan: Tokugawa or Edo period (1603–1867) ===
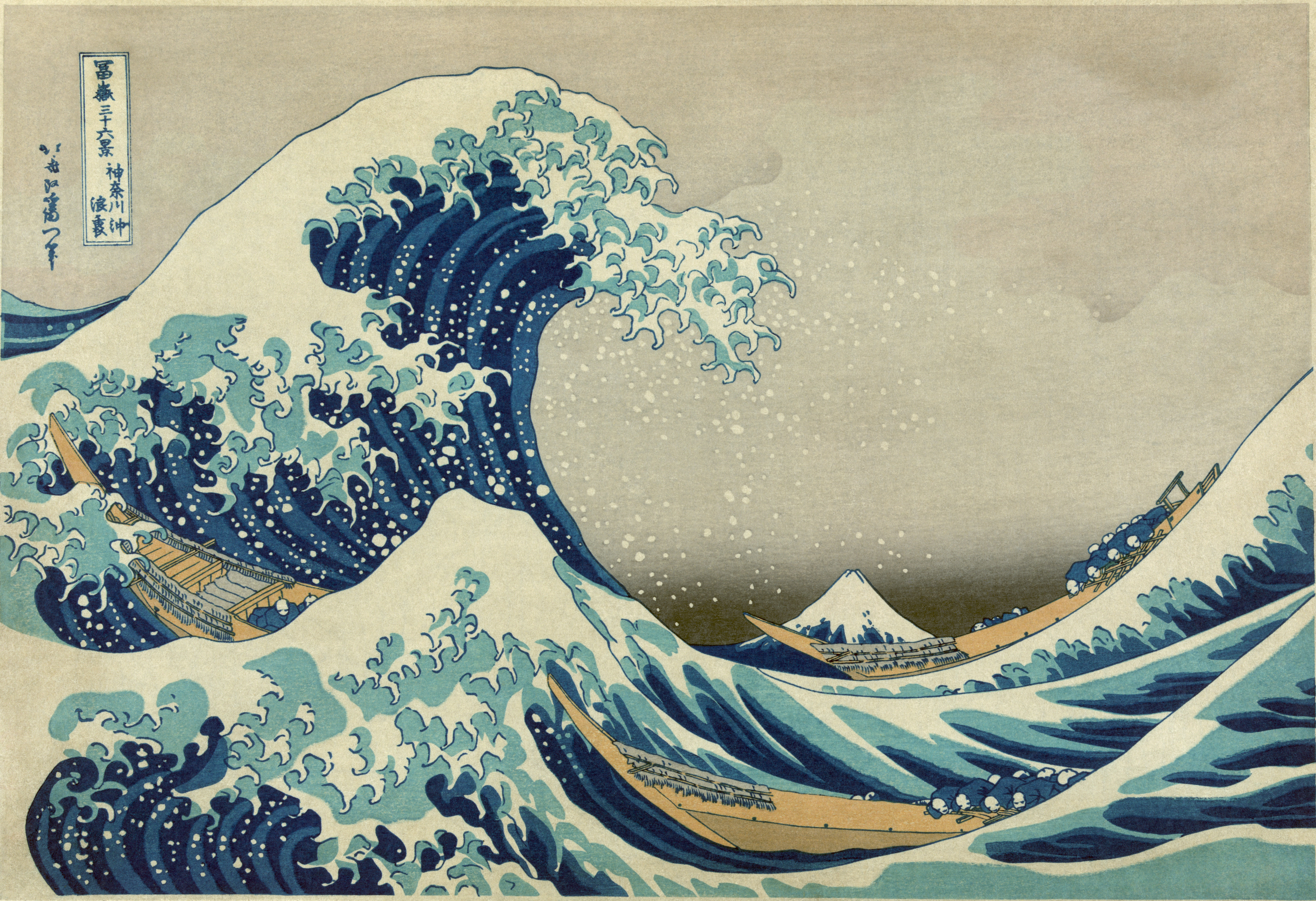
The Great Wave off Kanagawa, c. 1830 by Hokusai, an example of art flourishing in the Edo Period

In early-modern Japan following the Sengoku period of "warring states", central government had been largely reestablished by Oda Nobunaga and Toyotomi Hideyoshi during the Azuchi–Momoyama period. After the Battle of Sekigahara in 1600, central authority fell to Tokugawa Ieyasu who completed this process and received the title of shōgun in 1603.

Society in the Japanese "Tokugawa period" (see Edo society), unlike the shogunates before it, was based on the strict class hierarchy originally established by Toyotomi Hideyoshi. The daimyōs (feudal lords) were at the top, followed by the warrior-caste of samurai, with the farmers, artisans, and merchants ranking below. The country was strictly closed to foreigners with few exceptions with the Sakoku policy. Literacy rose in the two centuries of isolation.

In some parts of the country, particularly smaller regions, daimyōs and samurai were more or less identical, since daimyōs might be trained as samurai, and samurai might act as local lords. Otherwise, the largely inflexible nature of this social stratification system unleashed disruptive forces over time. Taxes on the peasantry were set at fixed amounts which did not account for inflation or other changes in monetary value. As a result, the tax revenues collected by the samurai landowners were worth less and less over time. This often led to numerous confrontations between noble but impoverished samurai and well-to-do peasants. None, however, proved compelling enough to seriously challenge the established order until the arrival of foreign powers.

=== India ===
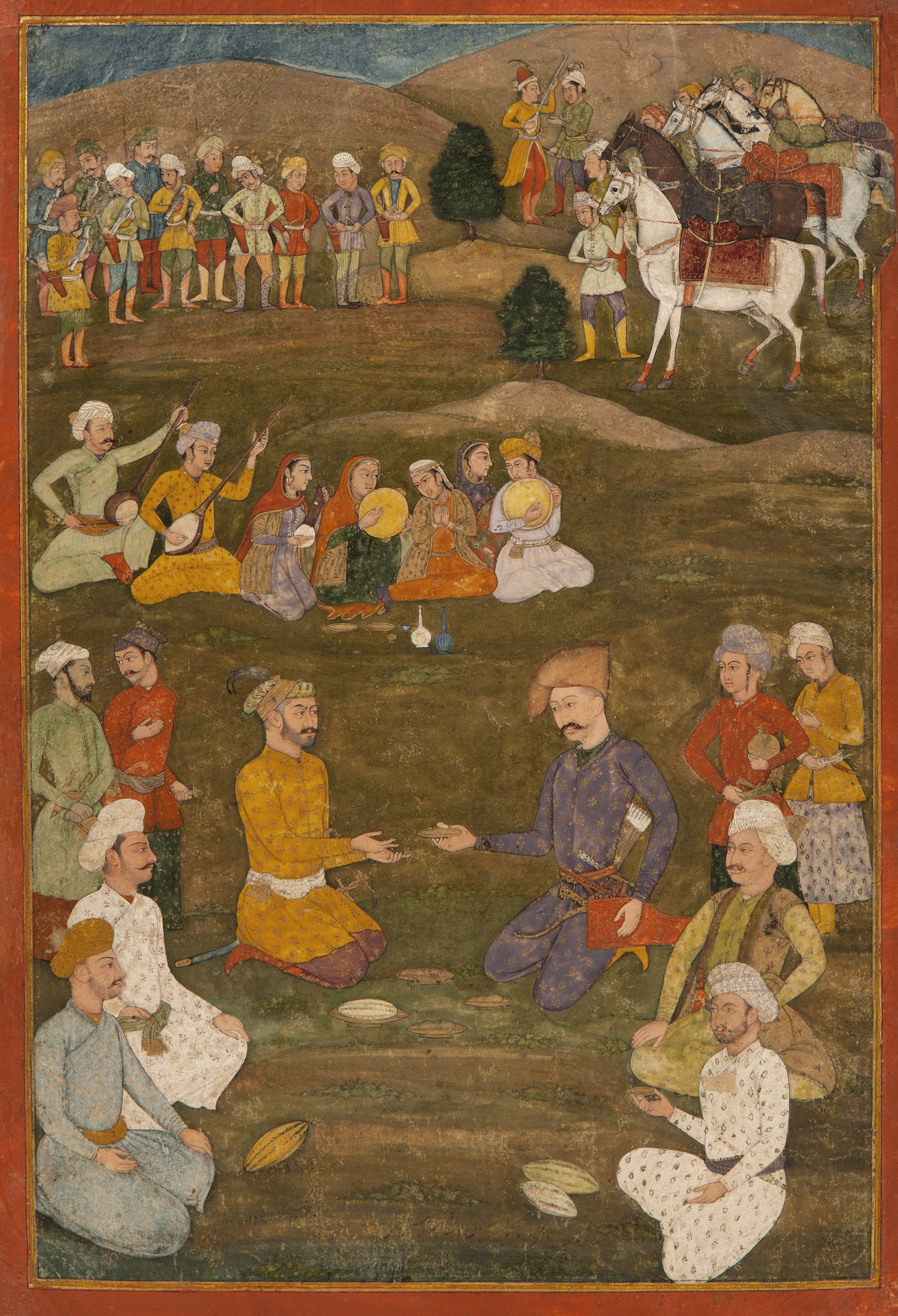
The Mughal ambassador Khan’Alam in 1618 negotiating with Shah Abbas the Great of Iran.

In the early 18th century, the Mughal Empire ruled most parts of the Indian subcontinent. Founded by Babur in 1526, the empire was notable for its a highly centralized administration connecting a diverse region. All the significant monuments of the Mughals, their most visible legacy, date to this period which was characterised by the expansion of Persian cultural influence in the Indian subcontinent, with brilliant literary, artistic, and architectural results. During emperor Shah Jahan and his son Aurangzeb's Islamic sharia reigns, the empire reached its architectural and economic zenith, and became the world's largest economy, worth over 25% of world GDP. In the mid-18th century it was a major proto-industrializing region.

The "classic period" ended with the death of Mughal Emperor Aurangzeb, although the dynasty continued for another 150 years. Following major events such as the Nader Shah's invasion of the Mughal Empire, Battle of Plassey, Battle of Buxar and the long Anglo-Mysore Wars, most of South Asia was colonised and governed by the British Empire, thus establishing the British Raj. The Maratha Empire was located in the south west of present-day India and expanded greatly under the rule of the Peshwas, the prime ministers of the Maratha empire. In 1761, the Maratha army lost the Third Battle of Panipat against Ahmad Shah Durrani which halted imperial expansion and the empire was then divided into a confederacy of Maratha states.

=== British and Dutch colonization ===
The European economic and naval powers pushed into Asia, initially to do trading, and gradually to take over major colonies. The Dutch led the way followed by the British. Portugal had arrived first, but was too weak to maintain its small holdings and was largely pushed out, retaining only Goa and Macau. The British set up a private organization, the East India Company, which handled both trade and imperial control of much of India.

The commercial colonization of India commenced in 1757, after the Battle of Plassey, when the Nawab of Bengal surrendered his dominions to the British East India Company, in 1765, when the company was granted the diwani, or the right to collect revenue, in Bengal and Bihar, or in 1772, when the company established a capital in Calcutta, appointed its first Governor-General, Warren Hastings, and became directly involved in governance.

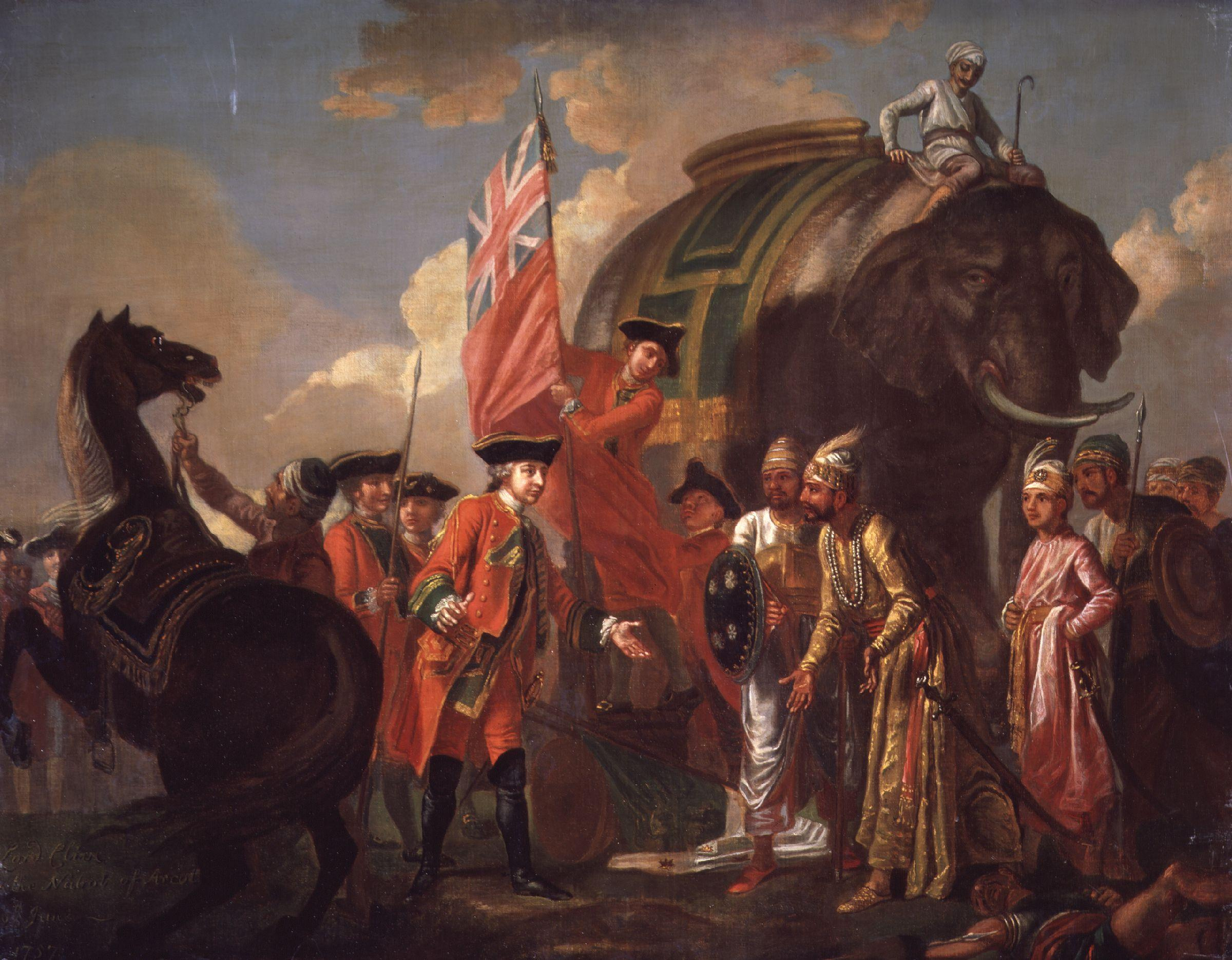
Robert Clive and Mir Jafar after the Battle of Plassey, 1757 by Francis Hayman

The Maratha states, following the Anglo-Maratha wars, eventually lost to the British East India Company in 1818 with the Third Anglo-Maratha War. The rule lasted until 1858, when, after the Indian rebellion of 1857 and consequent of the Government of India Act 1858, the British government assumed the task of directly administering India in the new British Raj. In 1819 Stamford Raffles established Singapore as a key trading post for Britain in their rivalry with the Dutch. However, their rivalry cooled in 1824 when an Anglo-Dutch treaty demarcated their respective interests in Southeast Asia. From the 1850s onwards, the pace of colonization shifted to a significantly higher gear.

The Dutch East India Company (1800) and British East India Company (1858) were dissolved by their respective governments, who took over the direct administration of the colonies. Only Thailand was spared the experience of foreign rule, although, Thailand itself was also greatly affected by the power politics of the Western powers. Colonial rule had a profound effect on Southeast Asia. While the colonial powers profited much from the region's vast resources and large market, colonial rule did develop the region to a varying extent.

== Late modern ==
=== Central Asia: The Great Game, Russia vs Great Britain ===
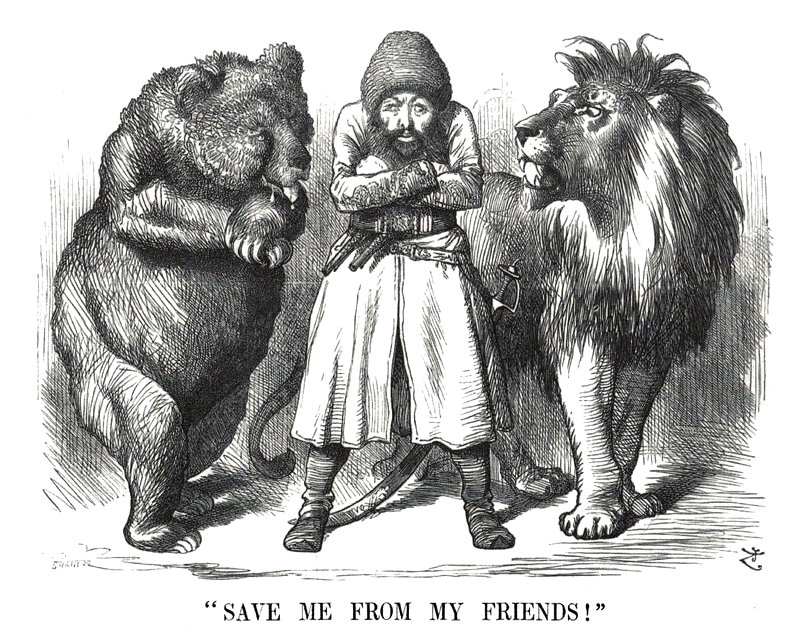
Political cartoon depicting the Afghan Emir Sher Ali with the rival "friends" the Russian Bear and British Lion (1878)

The Great Game was a political and diplomatic confrontation between Great Britain and Russia over Afghanistan and neighbouring territories in Central and South Asia. It lasted from 1828 to 1907. There was no war, but there were many threats. Russia was fearful of British commercial and military inroads into Central Asia, and Britain was fearful of Russia threatening its largest and most important possession, India. This resulted in an atmosphere of distrust and the constant threat of war between the two empires. Britain made it a high priority to protect all the approaches to India, and the "great game" is primarily how the British did this in terms of a possible Russian threat. Historians with access to the archives have concluded that Russia had no plans involving India, as the Russians repeatedly stated.

The Great Game began in 1838 when Britain decided to gain control over the Emirate of Afghanistan and make it a protectorate, and to use the Ottoman Empire, Qajar Iran, the Khanate of Khiva, and the Emirate of Bukhara as buffer states between both empires. This would protect India and also key British sea trade routes by stopping Russia from gaining a port on the Persian Gulf or the Indian Ocean. Russia proposed Afghanistan as the neutral zone, and the final result was diving up Afghanistan with a neutral zone in the middle between Russian areas in the north and British in the South. Important episodes included the failed First Anglo-Afghan War of 1838, the First Anglo-Sikh War of 1845, the Second Anglo-Sikh War of 1848, the Second Anglo-Afghan War of 1878, and the annexation of Kokand by Russia. The 1901 novel Kim by Rudyard Kipling made the term popular and introduced the new implication of great power rivalry. It became even more popular after the 1979 advent of the Soviet–Afghan War.

=== Qing China ===
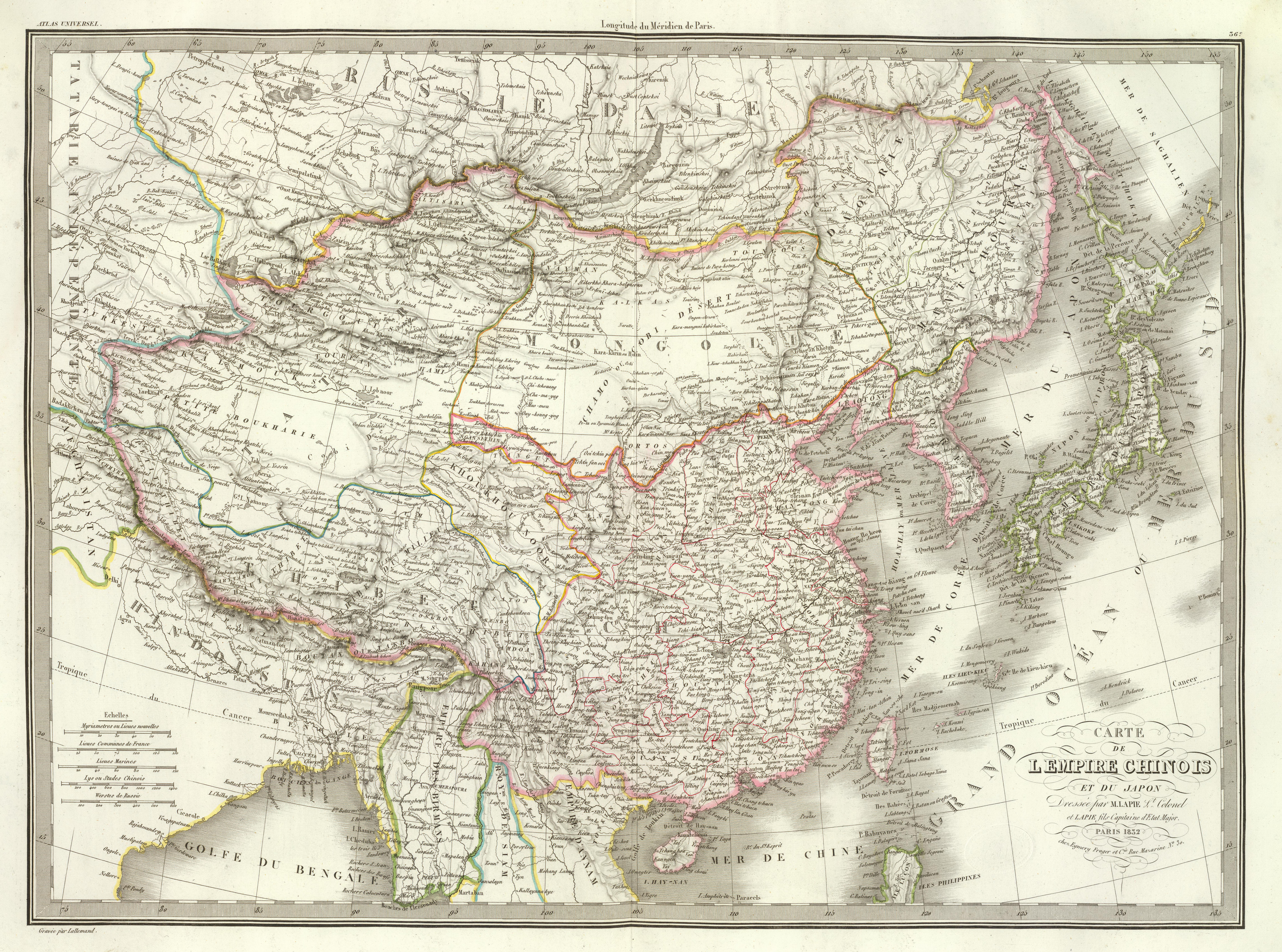
Map of the Qing Empire in 1832

By 1644, the northern Manchu people had conquered Ming dynasty and established a foreign dynasty—the Qing dynasty—once more. The Manchu Qing emperors, especially Confucian scholar Kangxi, remained largely conservative—retaining the bureaucracy and the scholars within it, as well as the Confucian ideals present in Chinese society. However, changes in the economy and new attempts at resolving certain issues occurred too. These included increased trade with Western countries that brought large amounts of silver into the Chinese economy in exchange for tea, porcelain, and silk textiles. This allowed for a new merchant-class, the compradors, to develop. In addition, repairs were done on existing dikes, canals, roadways, and irrigation works. This, combined with the lowering of taxes and government-assigned labor, was supposed to calm peasant unrest. However, the Qing failed to control the growing landlord class which had begun to exploit the peasantry and abuse their position.

By the late 18th century, both internal and external issues began to arise in Qing China's politics, society, and economy. The exam system with which scholars were assigned into the bureaucracy became increasingly corrupt; bribes and other forms of cheating allowed for inexperienced and inept scholars to enter the bureaucracy and this eventually caused rampant neglect of the peasantry, military, and the previously mentioned infrastructure projects. Poverty and banditry steadily rose, especially in rural areas, and mass migrations looking for work throughout China occurred. The perpetually conservative government refused to make reforms that could resolve these issues.

==== Opium Wars ====
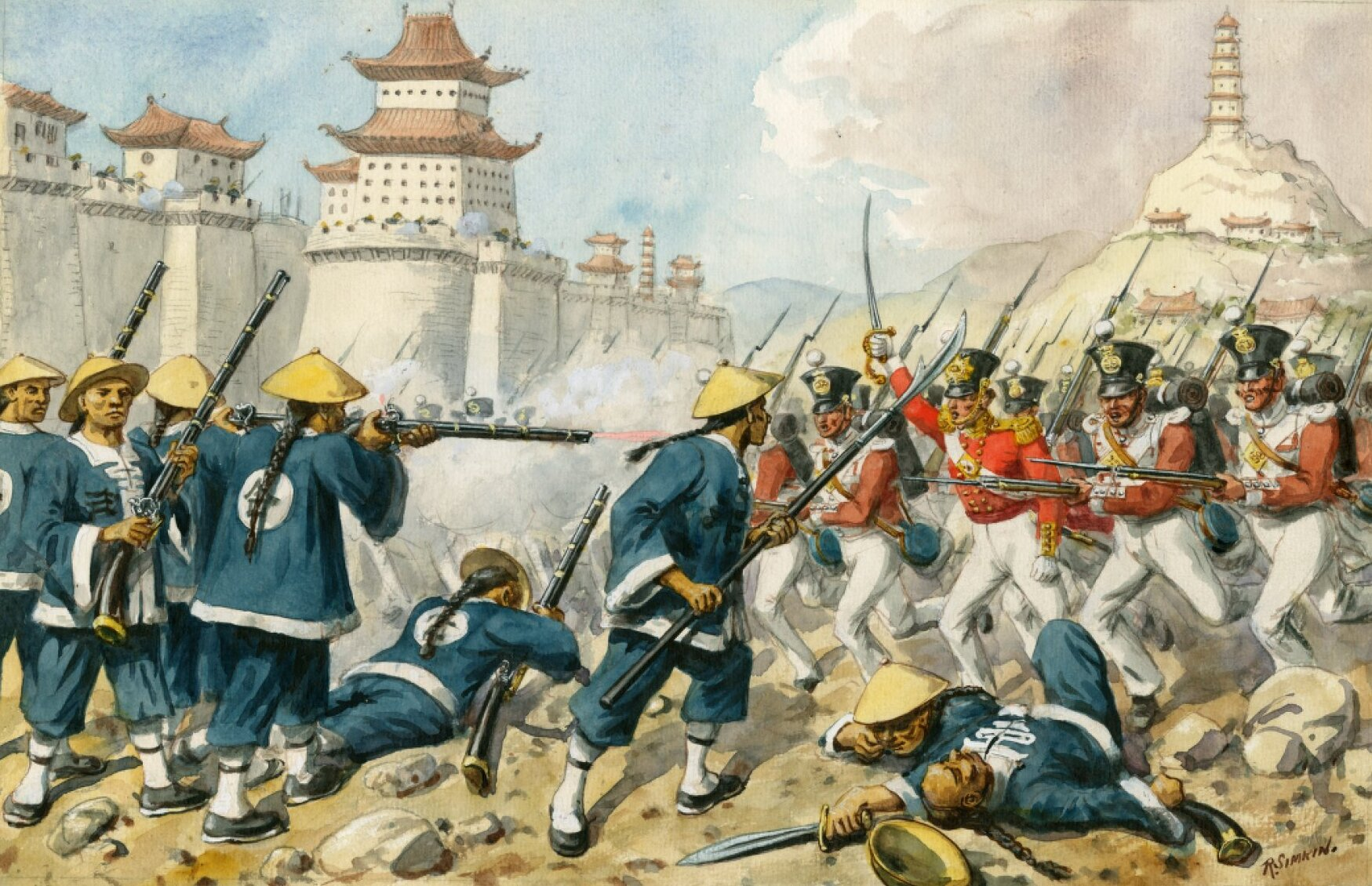
The Battle of Chinkiang of the First Opium War

China saw its status reduced by what it perceived as parasitic trade with Westerners. Originally, European traders were at a disadvantage because the Chinese cared little for their goods, while European demand for Chinese commodities such as tea and porcelain only grew. In order to tip the trade imbalance in their favor, British merchants began to sell Indian opium to the Chinese. Not only did this sap Chinese bullion reserves, it also led to widespread drug addiction amongst the bureaucracy and society in general. A ban was placed on opium as early as 1729 by the Yongzheng Emperor, but little was done to enforce it. By the early 19th century, under the new Daoguang Emperor, the government began serious efforts to eradicate opium from Chinese society. Leading this endeavour were respected scholar-officials including Imperial Commissioner Lin Zexu.

After Lin destroyed more than 20,000 chests of opium in the summer of 1839, Europeans demanded compensation for what they saw as unwarranted Chinese interference in their affairs. When it was not paid, the British declared war later the same year, starting what became known as the First Opium War. The outdated Chinese junks were no match for the advanced British gunboats, and soon the Yangzi River region came under threat of British bombardment and invasion. The emperor had no choice but to sue for peace, resulting in the exile of Lin and the making of the Treaty of Nanking, which ceded the British control of Hong Kong and opened up trade and diplomacy with other European countries, including Germany, France, and the USA.

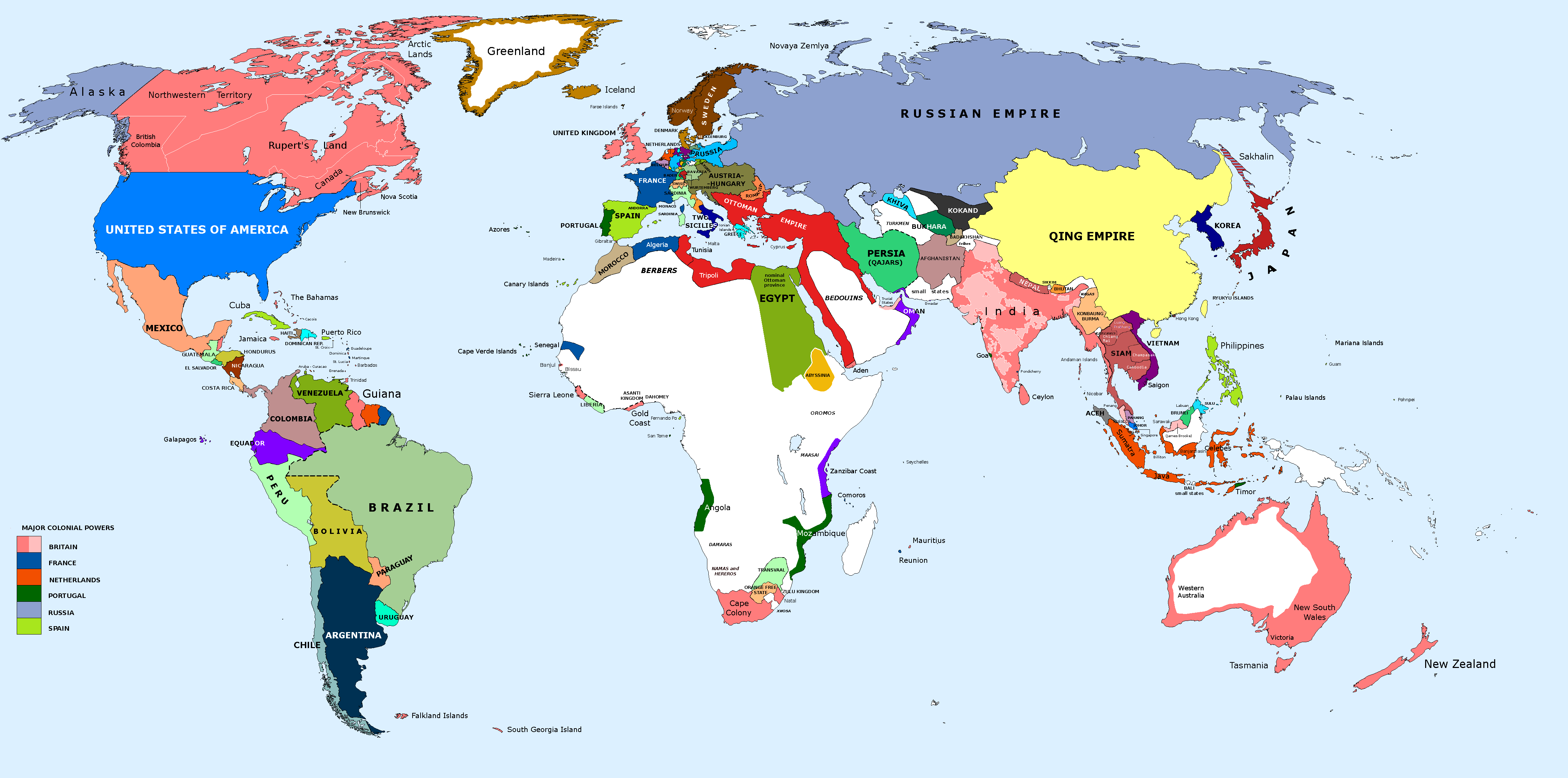
Political map of the world in 1860. Note: the polities of Africa are inaccurate.

Following the First Opium War, Western powers sought to expand their commercial and diplomatic privileges in China through a series of treaties. Dissatisfied with the Qing government's implementation of existing agreements, Britain launched the Second Opium War (1856–1860), forcing China to sign the Treaties of Tianjin in 1858. Under the treaties, additional ports were opened to foreign trade, foreigners gained access to China's interior, diplomats were permitted to reside in Beijing, then known as Peking, and import tariffs were reduced. The most-favoured-nation clause ensured that concessions obtained by one power were extended to others, allowing France, Russia, and the United States to secure similar privileges.

Chinese resistance to the treaties led to further conflict, culminating in the capture of Beijing by British and French forces in 1860 and the destruction of the Summer Palace. China subsequently ratified the agreements through the Convention of Beijing. Collectively known as the "Unequal Treaties," these agreements weakened Chinese sovereignty through extraterritorial rights and foreign economic influence, while replacing the traditional Chinese tribute system with Western diplomatic norms. The treaties facilitated foreign trade and presence in China but also fuelled widespread resentment towards Western imperialism and contributed to the growth of Chinese nationalism.

==== Manchuria ====
Manchuria came under influence of Russia with the building of the Chinese Eastern Railway through Harbin to Vladivostok. The Empire of Japan replaced Russian influence in the region as a result of the Russo-Japanese War in 1904–1905, and Japan laid the South Manchuria Railway in 1906 to Port Arthur. During the Warlord Era in China, Zhang Zuolin established himself in Northeast China, but was murdered by the Japanese for being too independent. The former Chinese emperor, Puyi, was then placed on the throne to lead a Japanese puppet state of Manchukuo. In August 1945, the Soviet Union invaded the region. From 1945 to 1948, Northeast China was a base area for Mao Zedong's People's Liberation Army in the Chinese Civil War. With the encouragement of the Kremlin, the area was used as a staging ground during the Civil War for the Chinese Communists, who were victorious in 1949 and have controlled ever since.

=== Joseon ===
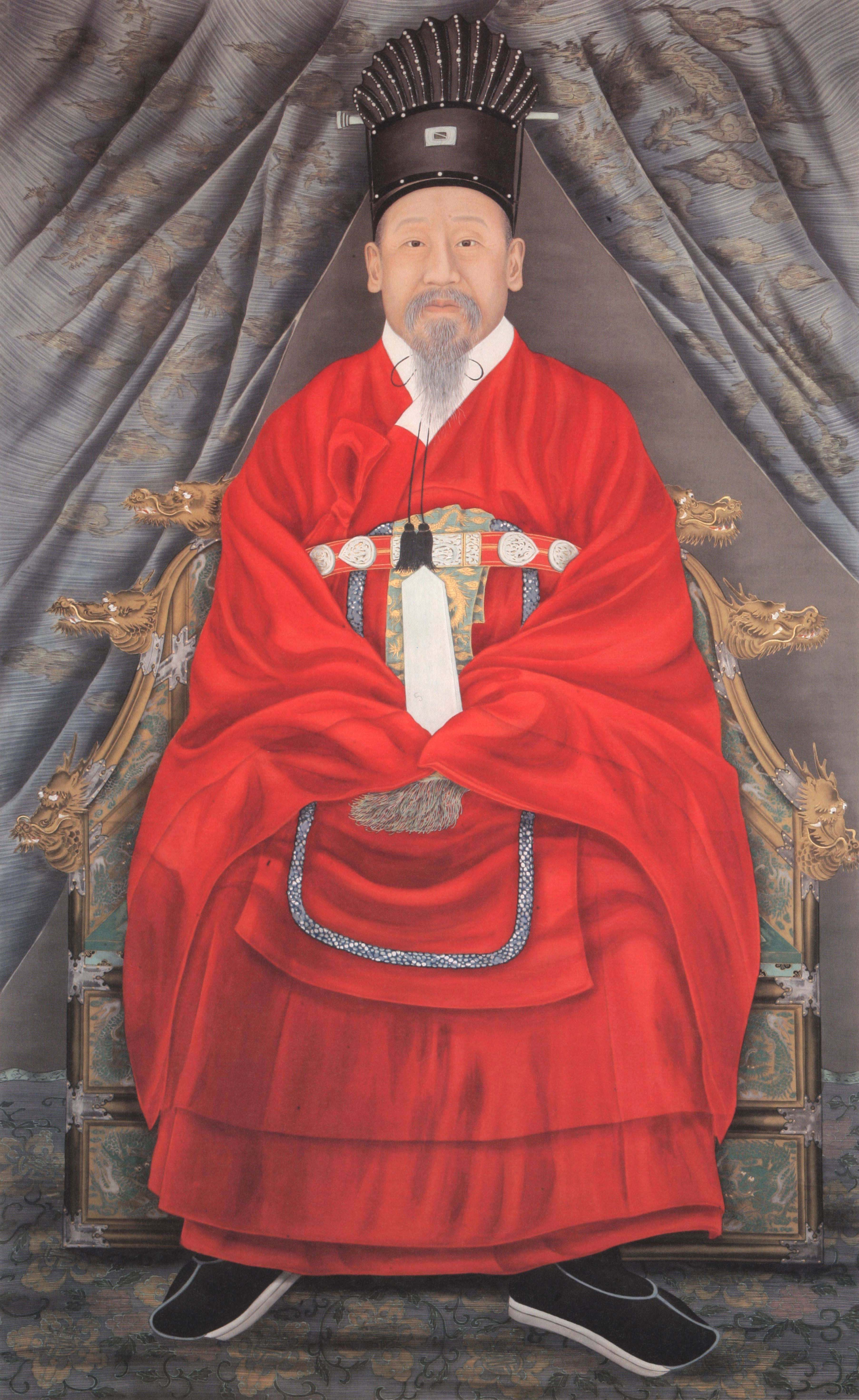
Gojong (1852–1919), the 26th king of Joseon dynasty and the first emperor of Korean Empire.

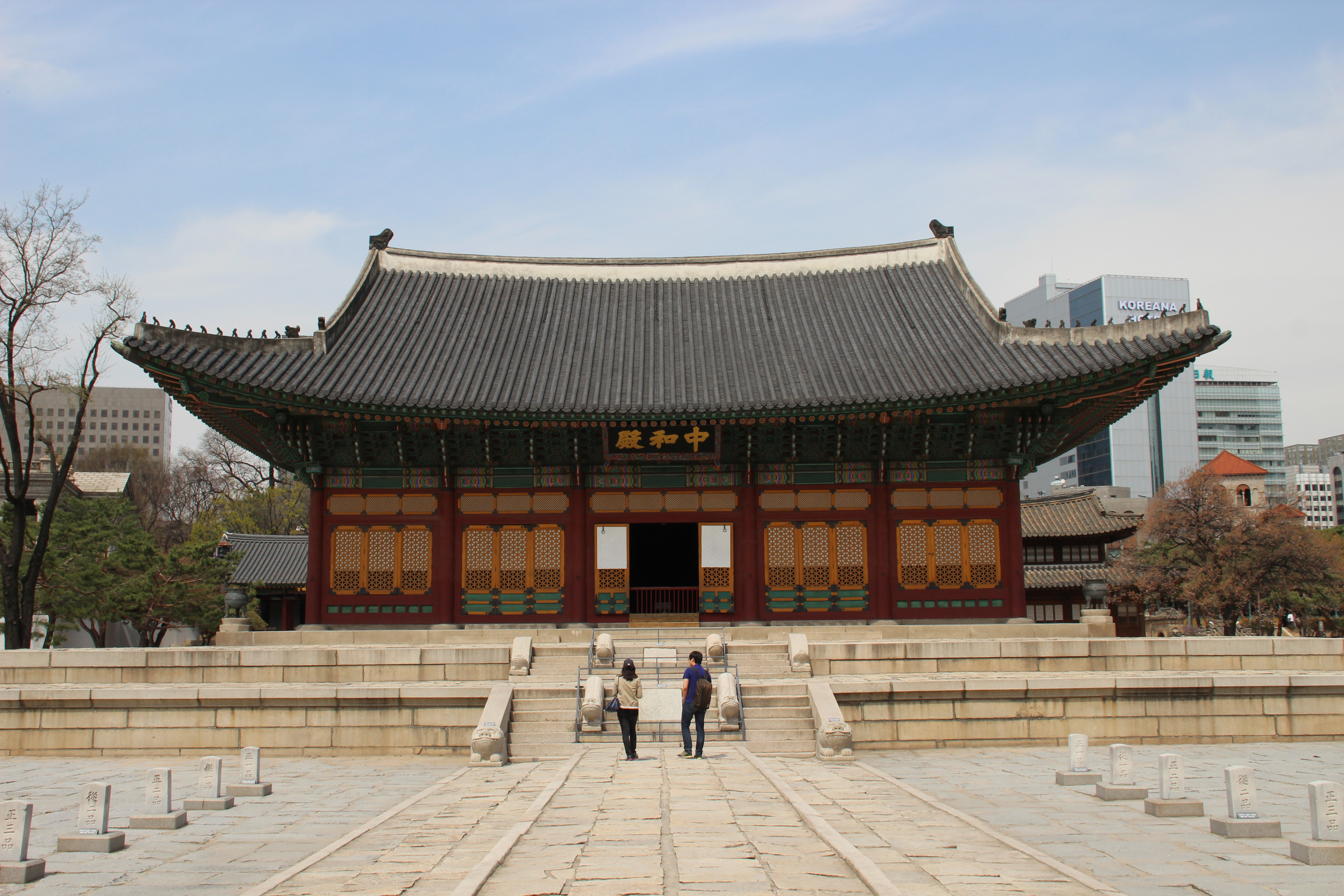
Deoksugung, the palace where Emperor Gojong established the Korean Empire.

In the 19th century, the king of Joseon was powerless as the noble family of the king's wife got the power and ruled the country by their way. The 26th king of Joseon dynasty, Gojong's father, Heungseon Daewongun wanted the king to be powerful again. Even he wasn't the king. As the father of a young king, he destroyed noble families and corrupt organizations, making the royal family powerful again. He wanted to rebuild Gyeongbokgung in order to display royal power but was criticized by the people because he spent enormous money and inflation occurred because of that. So his son, the real king Gojong got power.

=== Korean Empire ===
By Article 1 of the Treaty of Shimonoseki, which concluded the First Sino-Japanese War, China recognized Korea's complete independence and autonomy, ending the tributary relationship. The 26th king of Joseon, Gojong changed the nation's name to Daehan Jeguk (Korean Empire), and promoted himself as an emperor. The new empire accepted more western technology and strengthened military power, while pursuing a policy of neutrality. In the Russo-Japanese War, Japan ignored Korea's neutrality, and eventually Japan won against Russian Empire, and annexed the Korean peninsula. Japan first stole the right of diplomacy from Korean Empire illegally. But every western country ignored this invasion because they knew Japan became a strong country as they defeated Russian Empire. So emperor Gojong sent diplomats to a Dutch city known as The Hague to let everyone know that Japan stole the Empire's right illegally. But it was failed. Because the diplomats couldn't go into the conference room. Japan kicked Gojong off on the grounds that this reason. 3 years after, In 1910, Korean Empire became a part of Empire of Japan. It was the first time ever after invasion of Han dynasty in 108 BC.

== Contemporary ==
The European powers had control of other parts of Asia by the early 20th century, such as British India, French Indochina, Spanish East Indies, and Portuguese Macau and Goa. The Great Game between Russia and Britain was the struggle for power in the Central Asian region in the nineteenth century. The Trans-Siberian Railway, crossing Asia by train, was complete by 1916. Parts of Asia remained free from European control, although not influence, such as Qajar Iran, Thailand and majority of China. In the 20th century, the Empire of Japan expanded into China and Southeast Asia during the Second Sino-Japanese War and World War II. After the war, many Asian countries became independent from European powers. During the Cold War, the northern parts of Asia were communist controlled with the Soviet Union and People's Republic of China, while western allies formed pacts such as CENTO and SEATO. Conflicts such as the Korean War, Vietnam War and Soviet invasion of Afghanistan were fought between communists and anti-communists. In the decades after the Second World War, a massive restructuring plan drove Japan to become the world's second-largest economy, a phenomenon known as the Japanese post-war economic miracle. The Arab–Israeli conflict has dominated much of the recent history of West Asia. After the Soviet Union's collapse in 1991, there were many new independent nations in Central Asia and Eastern Europe.

=== China ===
Prior to World War II, China faced a civil war between Mao Zedong's Communist party and Chiang Kai-shek's nationalist party; the nationalists appeared to be in the lead. However, once the Japanese invaded in 1937, the two parties were forced to form a temporary ceasefire in order to defend China. The nationalists faced many military failures that caused them to lose territory and subsequently, respect from the Chinese masses. In contrast, the communists' use of guerilla warfare (led by Lin Biao) proved effective against the Japanese's conventional methods and put the Communist Party on top by 1945. They also gained popularity for the reforms they were already applying in controlled areas, including land redistribution, education reforms, and widespread health care. For the next four years, the nationalists would be forced to retreat to the small island east of Fujian province, known as Taiwan (formerly known as Formosa), where they remain today. In mainland China, People's Republic of China was established by the Communist Party, with Mao Zedong as its state chairman.

The communist government in China was defined by the party cadres. These hard-line officers controlled the People's Liberation Army, which itself controlled large amounts of the bureaucracy. This system was further controlled by the Central Committee, which additionally supported the state chairman who was considered the head of the government. The People's Republic's foreign policies included the repressing of secession attempts in Mongolia and Tibet and supporting of North Korea and North Vietnam in the Korean War and Vietnam War, respectively. By 1960 China and the USSR became adversaries, battling worldwide for control of local communist movements.

In modern times, China plays important roles in world economics and politics. China today is the world's second largest economy and the second fastest growing economy.

=== South Asia ===
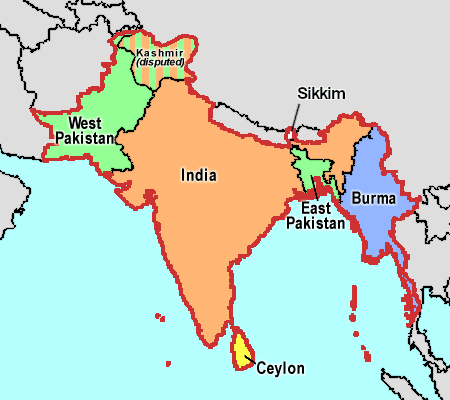
Britain's holdings on the Indian subcontinent were granted independence in 1947 and 1948, becoming five new independent states: India, Burma, Ceylon, Sikkim, and Pakistan (including East Bengal, from 1971 Bangladesh).

From the mid-18th century to the mid-19th century, large regions of India were gradually annexed by the East India Company, a chartered company acting as a sovereign power on behalf of the British government. Dissatisfaction with company rule in India led to the Indian Rebellion of 1857, which rocked parts of north and central India, and led to the dissolution of the company. India was afterwards ruled directly by the British Crown, in the British Raj. After World War I, a nationwide struggle for independence was launched by the Indian National Congress, led by Mahatma Gandhi, and noted for nonviolence. Later, the All-India Muslim League would advocate for a separate Muslim-majority nation state.

In August 1947, the British Indian Empire was partitioned into the Dominion of India and Dominion of Pakistan. In particular, the partition of Punjab and Bengal led to rioting between Hindus, Muslims, and Sikhs in these provinces and spread to other nearby regions, leaving some 500,000 dead. The police and army units were largely ineffective. The British officers were gone, and the units were beginning to tolerate if not actually indulge in violence against their religious enemies. Also, this period saw one of the largest mass migrations anywhere in modern history, with a total of 12 million Hindus, Sikhs, and Muslims moving between the newly created nations of India and Pakistan (which gained independence on 15 and 14 August 1947 respectively). In 1971, Bangladesh, formerly East Pakistan and East Bengal, seceded from Pakistan through an armed conflict sparked by the rise of the Bengali nationalist and self-determination movement.

=== Korea ===
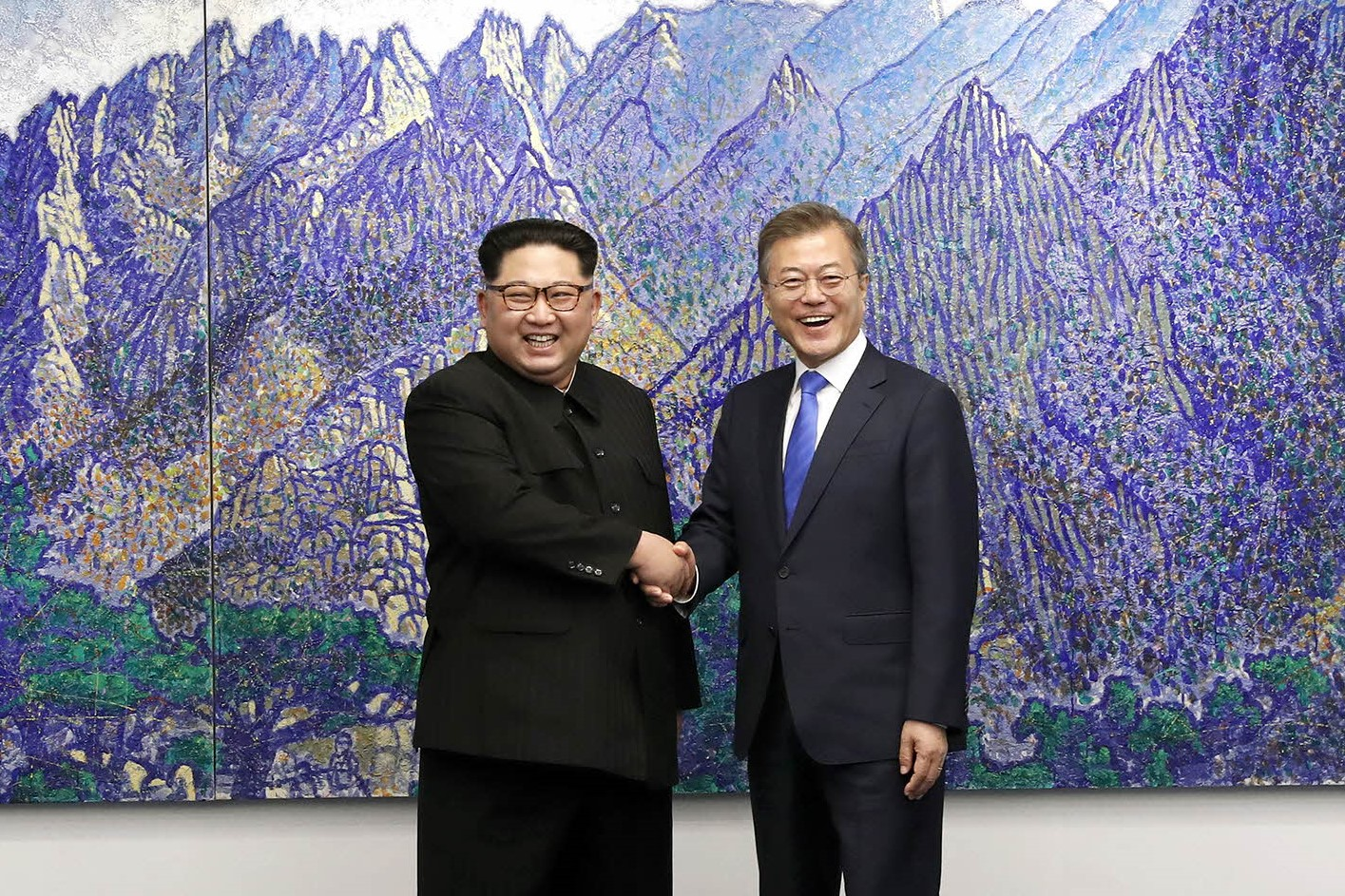
The third Inter-Korean Summit, which was held in 2018, between South Korean president Moon Jae-in and North Korean supreme leader Kim Jong Un. It was a historical event that symbolized the peace of Asia.

During the period when the Korean War occurred, Korea divided into North and South. Syngman Rhee became the first president of South Korea, and Kim Il Sung became the supreme leader of North Korea. After the war, the president of South Korea, Syngman Rhee attempts to become a dictator. The April Revolution occurred, and eventually Syngman Rhee was exiled from his country. In 1963, Park Chung Hee was empowered with a military coup d'état. He dispatched Republic of Korea Army to Vietnam War. And during this age, the economy of South Korea outran that of North Korea.

Although Park Chung Hee improved the nation's economy, he was a dictator, so people didn't like him. Eventually, he was murdered by Kim Jae-gyu. In 1979, Chun Doo-hwan was empowered by another coup d’état by military. He oppressed the resistances in the city of Gwangju, named the Gwangju Uprising. Despite the Gwangju Uprising, Chun Doo-hwan became the president. But the people resisted again in 1987, starting the June Struggle. As a result of Gwangju Uprising and June Struggle, South Korea finally became a democratic republic in 1987.

Roh Tae-woo (1988–93), Kim Young-sam (1993–98), Kim Dae-jung (1998–2003), Roh Moo-hyun (2003–2008), Lee Myung-bak (2008–2013), Park Geun-hye (2013–2017), Moon Jae-in (2017–2022), Yoon Suk Yeol (2022–2025) and Lee Jae Myung, (2025–) were elected as a president in order after 1987. In 1960, North Korea was far wealthier than South Korea. But in 1970, South Korea begins to outrun the North Korean economy. In 2018, South Korea is ranked #10 in world GDP ranking.

== See also ==
- Ancient Asian history
- List of history journals § Asia

== Bibliography ==
- Bose, Sugata; Jalal, Ayesha (2003), Modern South Asia: History, Culture, Political Economy (2nd ed.), Routledge, ISBN 0-415-30787-2
- Bowman, John S. (2000), Columbia Chronologies of Asian History and Culture, New York City: Columbia University Press, ISBN 978-0-231-50004-3
- Brown, Judith Margaret (1994). Modern India: The Origins of an Asian Democracy. Oxford University Press. ISBN 978-0-19-873112-2.
- Cotterell, Arthur. Asia: A Concise History (2011)
- Cotterell, Arthur. Western Power in Asia: Its Slow Rise and Swift Fall, 1415 - 1999 (2009) popular history; excerpt
- Curtin, Philip D. The World and the West: The European Challenge and the Overseas Response in the Age of Empire (2002)
- Embree, Ainslie T., and Carol Gluck, eds. Asia in Western and World History: A Guide for Teaching (M.E. Sharpe, 1997).
- Embree, Ainslie T., ed. Encyclopedia of Asian history (1988)
  - vol. 1 online; vol 2 online; vol 3 online; vol 4 online
- Fairbank, John K., Edwin O. Reischauer. A History of East Asian Civilization: Volume One : East Asia the Great Tradition and A History of East Asian Civilization: Volume Two : East Asia the Modern transformation (1966) Online free to borrow
- Metcalf, Barbara Daly; Metcalf, Thomas R. (2006). A Concise History of Modern India. Cambridge University Press. ISBN 978-0-521-86362-9.
- Moffett, Samuel Hugh. A History of Christianity in Asia, Vol. II: 1500–1900 (2003) excerpt
- Murphey, Rhoads. A History of Asia (8th ed, 2019) excerpt also Online
- Paine, S. C. M. The Wars for Asia, 1911–1949 (2014) excerpt
- Peers, Douglas M. (2006). India under Colonial Rule: 1700–1885. Pearson Education. ISBN 978-0-582-31738-3.
- Stearns, Peter N.; Michael Adas; Stuart B. Schwartz; Marc Jason Gilbert (2011), World Civilizations: The Global Experience (Textbook) (6th ed.), Upper Saddle River, NJ: Longman, ISBN 978-0-13-136020-4
- Stearns, Peter N., and William L. Langer. The Encyclopedia of World History: Ancient, Medieval, and Modern (2001)

=== Regions ===
- Adshead, Samuel Adrian Miles. Central Asia in world history (Springer, 2016).
- Best, Antony (2010). The International History of East Asia, 1900–1968: Trade, Ideology and the Quest for Order. London: Routledge. Archived from the original on August 21, 2019 – via Questia.
- Catchpole, Brian. A map history of modern China (1976), new maps & diagrams
- Clyde, Paul Herbert. International-Rivalries-In-Manchuria-1689-1928 (2nd ed. 1928) online free
- Clyde, Paul H, and Burton H. Beers. The Far East, a history of the Western impact and the Eastern response, 1830–1975 (6th ed. 1975) 575pp
  - Clyde, Paul Hibbert. The Far East: A History of the Impact of the West on Eastern Asia (3rd ed. 1948) online free; 836pp
- Ebrey, Patricia Buckley, Anne Walthall and James Palais. East Asia: A Cultural, Social, and Political History (2006); 639pp; also in 2-vol edition split at 1600.
- Fenby, Jonatham The Penguin History of Modern China: The Fall and Rise of a Great Power 1850 to the Present (3rd ed. 2019) popular history.
- Gilbert, Marc Jason. South Asia in World History (Oxford UP, 2017)
- Golden, Peter B. Central Asia in World History (Oxford UP, 2011)
- Holcombe, Charles. A History of East Asia: From the Origins of Civilization to the Twenty-First Century (2010).
- Huffman, James L. Japan in World History (Oxford, 2010)
- Jansen, Marius B. Japan and China: From War to Peace, 1894–1972 (1975)
- Karl, Rebecca E. "Creating Asia: China in the world at the beginning of the twentieth century." American Historical Review 103.4 (1998): 1096–1118. online
- Lockard, Craig. Southeast Asia in world history (Oxford UP, 2009).
- Ludden, David. India and South Asia: A Short History (2013).
- Mansfield, Peter, and Nicolas Pelham, A History of the Middle East (4th ed, 2013).
- Park, Hye Jeong. "East Asian Odyssey Towards One Region: The Problem of East Asia as a Historiographical Category." History Compass 12.12 (2014): 889–900. online
- Ropp, Paul S. China in World History (Oxford UP, 2010)

=== Economic history ===
- Allen, G.C. A Short Economic History Of Modern Japan 1867–1937 (1945) online; also 1981 edition free to borrow
- Cowan, C.D. ed. The economic development of China and Japan: studies in economic history and political economy (1964) online free to borrow
- Hansen, Valerie. The Silk Road: A New History (Oxford University Press, 2012).
- Jones, Eric. The European miracle: environments, economies and geopolitics in the history of Europe and Asia. (Cambridge UP, 2003).
- Lockwood, William W. The economic development of Japan; growth and structural change (1970) online free to borrow
- Pomeranz, Kenneth. The Great Divergence: China, Europe, and the Making of the Modern World Economy. (2001)
- Schulz-Forberg, Hagen, ed. A Global Conceptual History of Asia, 1860–1940 (2015)
- Smith, Alan K. Creating a World Economy: Merchant Capital, Colonialism, and World Trade, 1400–1825 (Routledge, 2019).
- Von Glahn, Richard. The Economic History of China (2016)

=== Relations with Europe ===
- Belk, Russell. "China’s global trade history: A western perspective." Journal of China Marketing 6.1 (2016): 1–22 [1 online].
- Hoffman, Philip T. Why Did Europe Conquer the World? (Princeton UP, 2017).\
- Ji, Fengyuan. "The West and China: discourses, agendas and change." Critical Discourse Studies 14.4 (2017): 325–340.
- Lach, Donald F. Asia in the Making of Europe (3 vol. U of Chicago Press, 1994).
- Lach, Donald F. Southeast Asia in the eyes of Europe: the sixteenth century (U of Chicago Press, 1968).
- Lach, Donald F., and Edwin J. Van Kley. "Asia in the eyes of Europe: the seventeenth century." The Seventeenth Century 5.1 (1990): 93–109.
- Lach, Donald F. China in the eyes of Europe: the Sixteenth Century (U of Chicago Press, 1968).
- Lee, Christina H., ed. Western visions of the Far East in a Transpacific Age, 1522–1657 (Routledge, 2016).
- Nayar, Pramod K. "Marvelous excesses: English travel writing and India, 1608–1727." Journal of British Studies 44.2 (2005): 213–238.
- Pettigrew, William A., and Mahesh Gopalan, eds. The East India Company, 1600–1857: Essays on Anglo-Indian Connection (Routledge, 2016).
- Smith, Alan K. Creating a World Economy: Merchant Capital, Colonialism, and World Trade, 1400–1825 (Routledge, 2019).
- Steensgaard, Niels. "European shipping to Asia 1497–1700." Scandinavian Economic History Review 18.1 (1970): 1–11.
