= Hoffman =

Hoffman is a surname of German origin. The original meaning in medieval times was "steward", i.e. one who manages the property of another. In English and other European languages, including Yiddish and Dutch, the name can also be spelled Hoffmann, Hofmann, Hofman, Huffman, and Hofmans.

== People with the surname ==
=== A ===
- Aaron Hoffman (1880–1944), American writer, director and comedian
- Abbie Hoffman (1936–1989), American social activist of prominence in the 1960s and 1970s
- Abraham Hoffman (1938–2015), Israeli basketball player
- Adolph Hoffmann (1858–1930), German politician and Prussian Minister for Science, Culture and Education
- Al Hoffman (1902–1960), Russian-born American songwriter
- Alan Hoffman (born 1982), American entrepreneur
- Albert Hofmann (1906–2008), Swiss chemist and discoverer of LSD
- Alex Hoffman-Ellis (born 1989), American football player
- Alice Hoffman (born 1952), American author
- Alice M. Hoffman (engineer) (born 1960), American engineer
- Alice M. Hoffman (historian), American historian
- Anthony Hoffman (1739–1790), New York politician
- Arthur Sullivant Hoffman (1876–1966), American magazine editor
- August Wilhelm von Hofmann (1818–1892) German organic chemist

=== B ===
- Barbara Hoffman (born 1931), All-American Girls Professional Baseball League player
- Beate Hofmann (born 1963), German Lutheran bishop
- Ben Hoffman (born 1974), American comedian and writer
- Ben Hoffman (triathlete) (born 1983), American triathlete
- Benjamin Hoffman (1864–1922), American lawyer, politician, and judge
- Benzion Hoffman best known by the pen name Zivion, Yiddish writer, journalist, and political activist
- Bern Hoffman (1913–1979), American film and television actor
- Bernard Hoffman (1913–1979), American photographer
- Biff Hoffman (1904–1954), American football player
- Bill Hoffman (disambiguation), several people
- Brock Hoffman (born 1998), American football player
- Bryce G. Hoffman (born 1969), American author

=== C ===
- Calvin Hoffman (died 1987), American theater press agent and writer
- Camille Hoffman (born 1987), American artist
- Carl von Hoffman (1889–1982), Russian adventurer
- Carl Henry Hoffman (1896–1980), Pennsylvania politician
- Charles Hoffman (1911–1972), American screenwriter and film producer
- Charles E. Hoffman (born 1949), American business executive and college dean
- Charles Fenno Hoffman (1806–1884), American author, poet and editor
- Charlotta Hoffman (1807–1877) Swedish actress
- Christopher Hoffman (born 1981), Zimbabwean actor and voice artist
- Clara Cleghorn Hoffman (1831–1908), American educator and temperance reformer
- Clare Hoffman (1875–1967), American politician
- Clarence Hoffman (1933–2025), American politician in Iowa

=== D ===
- Daniel Hoffman (1923–2013), American poet, essayist, and academic
- Danny Hoffman (1880–1922), American baseball player
- Darleane C. Hoffman (1926–2025), American nuclear chemist
- David Hoffman (disambiguation), several people
- Donald D. Hoffman (born 1955), American cognitive psychologist and popular science author
- Dorothea Hoffman (died 1710), Swedish hat maker
- Dorothy Hoffman (1915–1996), American engineer
- Doug Hoffman (born 1953), politician, congressional candidate
- Dustin Hoffman (born 1937), American actor and film director
- Dutch Hoffman (1904–1962), American baseball player

=== E ===
- E. T. A. Hoffmann (1776–1822), Ernst Theodor Amadeus Hoffmann, German Romantic author of fantasy and Gothic horror
- Edward George Hoffman (1877–1931), American politician
- Edward J. Hoffman (1942–2004), American professor, co-inventor of the PET scanner
- Elaine Hoffman Watts (1932–2017), American klezmer drummer
- Elisha Hoffman (1839–1929), American hymn composer
- Elmer J. Hoffman (1899–1976), American politician
- Emily Hoffman (1876–1927), American socialite
- Ernst Reinhold von Hofmann (1801–1871), Russian geologist and mineralogist
- Eugene Augustus Hoffman (1829–1902), American clergyman
- Eva Hoffman (born 1945), Polish-American writer

=== F ===
- F. Burrall Hoffman (1882–1980), American architect
- Fabian Hoffman (1917–1980), American football player
- François-Benoît Hoffman (1760–1828), French playwright and critic
- Frederick Ludwig Hoffman (1865–1946), American statistician

=== G ===
- Gene L. Hoffman (1932–2007), American educator and politician
- George H. Hoffman (1838–1922), South Dakota politician
- Glenn Hoffman (born 1958), American baseball player, coach, and manager
- Grace Hoffman (1921–2008), American operatic mezzo-soprano and academic teacher
- Gregory Hofmann (born 1992), Swiss ice hockey player

=== H ===
- H. Lawrence Hoffman (1911–1977), American illustrator
- Harold G. Hoffman (1896–1954), American politician and governor of New Jersey
- Heinrich Hoffman (1836–1894), American Civil War Corporal in the Union Army
- Henry William Hoffman (1825–1895), American politician
- Herman H. Hoffman (1844–1931), American farmer and politician
- Herman S. Hoffman (1841–1912), American Reformed Episcopalian bishop

=== I ===
- Irwin Hoffman (1924–2018), North American and Latin American conductor
- Irwin F. Hoffman (1927–2003), American politician from Maryland
- Izzy Hoffman (1875–1942), American baseball player

=== J ===
- Jack Hoffman (2005—2025), American pediatric cancer patient
- Jack Hoffman (American football) (1930–2001), American football player
- Jackie Hoffman (born 1960), American actress and stand-up comedian
- Jacob Hoffman (1881–1956), Hungarian rabbi
- Jacob Hoffman (musician) (died 1974), American xylophone player
- Jan Hoffmann (born 1955), German figure skater
- Janice Hoffman, birth name of Janice H. Levin (1913–2001), philanthropist and art collector from New York City
- Jason Hoffman (born 1989), Australian football (soccer) player
- Jay Hoffman (rugby league) (born 1958), Australian rugby league footballer
- Jean Hoffman (water polo) (1893–?), Belgian water polo player
- Jeff Hoffman (born 1993), American baseball player
- Jeffrey A. Hoffman (born 1944), American astronaut
- Jerzy Hoffman (born 1932), Polish film director and screenwriter
- Jessie Hoffman Jr. (1978–2025), American convicted murderer executed in Louisiana
- Joanna Hoffman (born 1953), Polish-born American computer executive
- John Hoffman (filmmaker) (1904–1980), Hungarian-American filmmaker
- John T. Hoffman (1828–1888), governor of New York state and mayor of New York City
- Josef Hofmann (1876–1954), Polish-American pianist, composer, music teacher, and inventor
- Josef Anton Hofmann (1924–2010), London-born American audio engineer, son of Josef Hofmann
- Josh Hoffman (born 1988), Australian Rugby League player
- Josiah Ogden Hoffman (1766–1837), New York State Attorney General 1795–1802
- Josias Philip Hoffman (1807–1879), Boer politician and first President of the Orange Free State
- Jules Hoffman, American children's musician
- Julius Hoffman (1895–1983), presiding judge in the Chicago Eight trial

=== K ===
- Karla Hoffman, American operations researcher
- Katherine B. Hoffman (1914–2020), American chemist and academic administrator
- Klaus H. Hofmann (1911–1995), American chemist
- Klementyna Hoffmanowa (1798–1845), Polish writer and translator

=== L ===
- Larry Hoffman (1878–1948), American baseball player
- Lauren Hoffman (born 1977), American singer
- Lyman Hoffman (born 1950), member of the Alaska Senate

=== M ===
- Malvina Hoffman (1887–1966), American sculptor and author
- Mani Hoffman (born 1975), French singer and songwriter
- Manny Hoffman (1937–2013), American politician and businessman
- Marc Hoffman (born 1961), American composer
- Mark González Hoffman (born 1984), Chilean footballer
- Mat Hoffman (born 1972), American BMX rider
- Matthew Hoffman (murderer) (born 1980), American triple murderer
- Max Hoffman (1904–1981), Austrian-born importer of European automobiles into the United States
- Melchior Hoffman (c. 1490 – 1543), 16th-century German religious leader
- Michael Hoffman (director) (born 1956), American movie director
- Michael A. Hoffman (1944–1990), American archaeologist
- Michael A. Hoffman II (born 1954), American Holocaust denier
- Michelle Hofmann, Australian politician
- Mike Hoffman (born 1989), Canadian ice hockey player
- Monty Hoffman (1952–2013), American actor and writer, known for Comedy's Dirtiest Dozen
- Myer Hoffman (1902–1959), English-born Irish cricketer
- Myn M. Hoffman (1883–1951), American military nurse

=== N ===
- Nadine Hoffman, All-American Girls Professional Baseball League player
- Nanna Hoffman (1846–1920), Swedish entrepreneur
- Nicholas von Hoffman (1929–2018), American journalist
- Neil Hoffman (c. 1939), American academic administrator, college president, educator
- Nina Kiriki Hoffman (born 1955), American fantasy author
- Noah Hoffman (born 1989), American Olympic skier
- Nolan Hoffman (born 1985), South African track cyclist
- Nolan Hoffman (baseball) (born 1997), American baseball player

=== O ===
- Ogden Hoffman (1794–1856), New York State Attorney General 1854–1855
- Ogden Hoffman Jr. (1822–1891), American federal judge
- Otto Hoffman (1879–1944), American film actor

=== P ===
- Paul Hoffman (basketball) (1925–1998), American basketball player
- Paul G. Hoffman (1891–1974), American automobile company executive
- Philip Hoffman (disambiguation), several people

=== R ===
- Rachel Hoffman (1984–2008), American student, murder victim in botched drug sting
- Reid Hoffman (born 1967), American entrepreneur
- Remington Hoffman (born 1988), American actor and director
- Richard Hoffman (disambiguation), several people
- Rick Hoffman, American actor
- Robby Hoffman (born 1989), American-Canadian comedian, writer, and talk show host
- Robert Hoffman (disambiguation), several people

=== S ===
- Samuel Hoffman (1903–1967), American thereminist
- Sarada Hoffman (1929–2025), Indian dancer and choreographer
- Steve Hoffman (disambiguation), several people

=== T ===
- Tex Hoffman (1893–1947), American baseball player
- Thom Hoffman (born 1957), Dutch actor and photographer
- Toni Hoffman, Australian nurse and whistleblower
- Trevor Hoffman (born 1967), Major League Baseball pitcher
- Tristan Hoffman (born 1970), Dutch road racing cyclist

=== V ===
- Victor Ernest Hoffman (1946–2004), Canadian mass murderer

=== W ===
- William Hoffman (disambiguation), several people
