= Philip Hoffman =

Philip, Phillip, or Phil Hoffman may refer to:

== Arts and entertainment ==
- Philip Hoffman (filmmaker) (born 1955), Canadian filmmaker
- Philip Seymour Hoffman (1967–2014), American actor
- Philipp Hofmann (photographer), German photographer
- Phil Hoffman (Neighbours), Australian soap opera character

== Law and politics ==
- Philip Hoffman (British politician) (1878–1959), British trade unionist and politician
- Phillip Hoffman (Ontario politician) (1901–1980), Canadian politician
- Philip E. Hoffman (1908–1993), American lawyer and diplomat
- Philip Hoffmann (German politician) (born 1988)

== Sports ==
- Philip Hoffman (surfing) (1930–2010), American surfer
- Philipp Hoffmann (footballer) (born 1992), German footballer
- Philipp Hofmann (born 1993), German footballer
- Philip Hoffmann (alpine skier) (born 2002), Austrian alpine skier

== Others ==
- Philipp Hoffmann (architect) (1806–1889), German architect and builder
- Philip B. Hofmann (1909–1986), American businessman
- Philip Guthrie Hoffman (1915–2008), American university president
- Philip T. Hoffman, American economic historian

== Other uses ==
- Phil Hoffman House, American historic place in Oskaloosa, Iowa

== See also ==
- Hoffman Philip (1872–1951), American diplomat
- Hoffman
