= Hofmann (surname) =

Hofmann is a German surname. Notable people with the surname include:

- Albert Hofmann (1906–2008), Swiss chemist, "father" of LSD
- Andreas Hofmann (athlete) (born 1991), German athlete
- Andreas Joseph Hofmann (1752–1849), German philosopher and revolutionary
- Armin Hofmann (1920–2020), Swiss designer
- August Wilhelm von Hofmann (1818–1892), German chemist
- Beate Hofmann (born 1963), German Lutheran bishop
- Charles Hofmann (1763–1823), Dutch musician and composer
- Daniel Hofmann (born 1996), Swiss natural luger
- Eduard von Hofmann (1837–1897), Austrian physician and forensic pathologist
- Elise Hofmann (1889–1955), Austrian paleobotanist
- Ernst Hofmann (1880–1945), German film actor
- Fred Hofmann (1894–1964), American baseball player and coach
- Fritz Hofmann (chemist) (1866–1956), German chemist
- Fritz Hofmann (athlete) (1871–1927), German athlete
- Gert Hofmann (1931–1993), German writer
- Gunther O. Hofmann (born 1957), a German surgeon, physicist and university teacher
- Hans Hofmann (1880–1966), German-born American painter
- Hans Georg Hofmann (1873–1942), German politician
- Hans J. Hofmann (1936–2010), German-born Canadian paleontologist
- Harald Hofmann (born 1973), Austrian rower
- Heinrich Hofmann (painter) (1824–1911), German painter
- Heinrich Hofmann (composer) (1842–1902), German composer and pianist
- Henner Hofmann (1950–2026), Mexican cinematographer, producer and screenwriter
- Hofmann von Hofmannsthal
- Augustin Emil Hofmann von Hofmannsthal (1815–1881), Austrian industrialist
- Hugo Hofmann von Hofmannsthal (1874–1929), Austrian novelist, librettist, poet, dramatist, narrator, and essayist
- Horst Hofmann (1919–1978), German U-boat officer
- Isaak Löw Hofmann, Edler von Hofmannsthal (1759–1849), Austrian merchant
- Johann Jacob Hofmann (1635–1706), a Swiss theologian, historian and compiler of the Lexicon Universale
- John Beck Hofmann (born 1969), Hollywood screenwriter and director
- Jonas Hofmann (born 1992), German footballer
- Josef Hofmann (1876–1957), Polish-American pianist, composer and inventor
- Joseph Ehrenfried Hofmann (1900–1973), German historian of mathematics
- Karl Andreas Hofmann (1870–1940), German inorganic chemist
- Karl-Wilhelm Hofmann (1921–1945), German Luftwaffe ace
- Klaus Hofmann (born 1939), German musicologist
- Klaus H. Hofmann (1911–1995), Swiss/American biochemist
- Leopold Hofmann (1738–1793), Austrian classical composer
- Leopold Hofmann (footballer) (1905–1976), Austrian footballer
- Ludwig Hofmann (footballer) (1900–1935), German footballer
- Ludwig von Hofmann (1861–1945), German painter
- Mark Hofmann (born 1954), U.S. murderer and forger, antagonistic former LDS
- Markus Hofmann (born 1975), German memory trainer, keynote speaker and author
- Max Hofmann (born 1974), German journalist and moderator
- Maximilian Hofmann (born 1993), Austrian footballer
- Michael Hofmann (disambiguation), several people
  - Michael Hofmann (born 1957), German poet and translator
- Michel-Rostislav Hofmann (1915–1975), Franco-Russian translator, writer and musicologist
- Murad Wilfried Hofmann (1931–2020), Muslim German diplomat and author
- Nico Hofmann (born 1959), German film director and film producer
- Olivia Hofmann (born 1992), Austrian sport shooter
- Ottmar Hofmann (1835–1900), German entomologist
- Otto Hofmann (1896–1982), Nazi SS general and convicted war criminal
- Pavel Hofmann (born 1938), Czech rower
- Peter Hofmann (1944–2010), German tenor
- Richard Hofmann (composer) (1844–1918), German composer
- Richie Hofmann (born 1987), American poet
- Roald Hoffman, Polish-American chemist
- Rudolf Hofmann (1895–1970), German General of World War II
- Steffen Hofmann (born 1980), German footballer
- Thomas Hofmann (born 1968), German food chemist and academic administrator
- Vlastimil Hofmann (1881–1970), birth name of Polish artist Wlastimil Hofman
- William Hofmann (1824–1902), American Union Army officer during the American Civil War
