= Elise Hofmann =

Austrian paleobotanist and geologist

Elise Hofmann (5 February 1889 – 14 March 1955) was an Austrian teacher, paleobotanist, and geologist. She studied the fossils found in Austrian lignite, publishing over 120 works, including the 1934 book Palaeohistologie der Pflanze (Paleohistology of the Plant). She was made a correspondent of the Geological Survey of Austria in 1931 and the Landesmuseum Niederösterreich in 1933. She was appointed professor emerita of the University of Vienna.

== Life ==
Hofmann was born on 5 February 1889 in Vienna. Her father Emil Hofmann was a school inspector, writer and, honorary curator at the Museum Carnuntinum. She worked as a middle school teacher, but after gaining her high school diploma, she attended university. She graduated from the University of Vienna with a doctorate in 1920, having specialized in plant anatomy. She studied under Richard Wettstein, H. Möller, and Othenio Abel. After Abel was dismissed from his position as dean at the university in 1934, Hofmann was supported by Fritz Knoll, professor of botany. She continued working as a middle school teacher while setting up a private laboratory to pursue her research. In 1943, after joining the National Socialist Party, she gained a paid, part-time extraordinary university professorship, which allowed her to reduce her teaching workload.

Hofmann was primarily a paleobotanist and geologist; however, she also studied cave plants, the plankton of Lake Hallstatt, the anatomy of various tropical plants, and the ecology of plants in the Mödling region. She was the only woman to participate in the state-funded excavation of the Drachenhöhle cave, the monograph of which was one of the founding documents of the field of speleology. She produced over 120 articles, including her 1934 book Palaeohistologie der Pflanze (Paleohistology of the Plant), which formed the basis of her habilitation degree, awarded in 1935. Her paleontological work included research on phosphatized wood remains from Prambachkirchen. She developed her own cutting and grinding techniques to expose the histological features of samples for identification.

Hofmann was made a correspondent of the Geological Survey of Austria in 1931 and of the Landesmuseum Niederösterreich in 1933. In 1950, she was appointed professor emerita at the University of Vienna. She was a long-standing member of the Vienna Zoological-Botanical Society.

Hofmann died on 14 March 1955 after a brief illness.

The standard author abbreviation E.Hofm. is used to indicate this person as the author when citing a botanical name.
