= Eduard Hoffmann =

Eduard Hoffmann can be:

- Ede Reményi (1828-1898), born Eduard Hoffmann, an Austrian-Hungarian violonist;
- Eduard Hoffmann (1892-1980), a Swiss typographer most notably know for the Helvetica font;
- Eduard Hoffmann-Krayer (1864-1936), a Swiss folklorist.

== See also ==
- Edward Hoffman
