= Hofman =

Hofman is a Dutch toponymic or occupational surname. In the Netherlands, exactly 10,000 people carried the name in 2007, while in Belgium, 1707 people were named Hofman in 1998.

Elsewhere, the surname could be derived from the German equivalents Hoffman or Hoffmann.

- Adam Hofman (b. 1980), Polish politician
- Anna Hofman-Uddgren (1868–1947), Swedish actress, cabaret singer and film director
- Bobby Hofman (1925–1994), American baseball player
- Branko Hofman (1929–1991), Slovene poet
- Corinne Hofman (b. 1959), Dutch archaeologist
- David Hofman (1908–2003), member of the Universal House of Justice
- Ethel G. Hofman (b. 1939), Jewish American culinary author
- Florentijn Hofman (b. 1977), Dutch artist
- Jan-Baptist Hofman (1758–1835), Flemish poet and playwright
- Jan Cornelis Hofman (1889–1966), Dutch art painter
- Joanna Hofman (b. 1967), Polish actress, diplomat
- Ota Hofman (1928–1989), Czech children's author
- Pieter Hofman (1640–1692), Flemish Baroque painter
- René Hofman (b. 1961), Dutch footballer
- Robin Hofman (b. 1986), Dutch footballer
- Rogier Hofman (b. 1986), Dutch field hockey player
- Silvia Hofman (b. 1981), Dutch handball player
- Solly Hofman (1882–1956), American baseball player
- Vlastislav Hofman (1884–1964), Czech artist and architect
- Wlastimil Hofman (1881–1970), Polish painter
- Wim Hofman (b. 1941), Dutch author

== See also ==
- Hofmans
- Hofmann (surname)
- Hoffman
