= Bärenschützklamm =

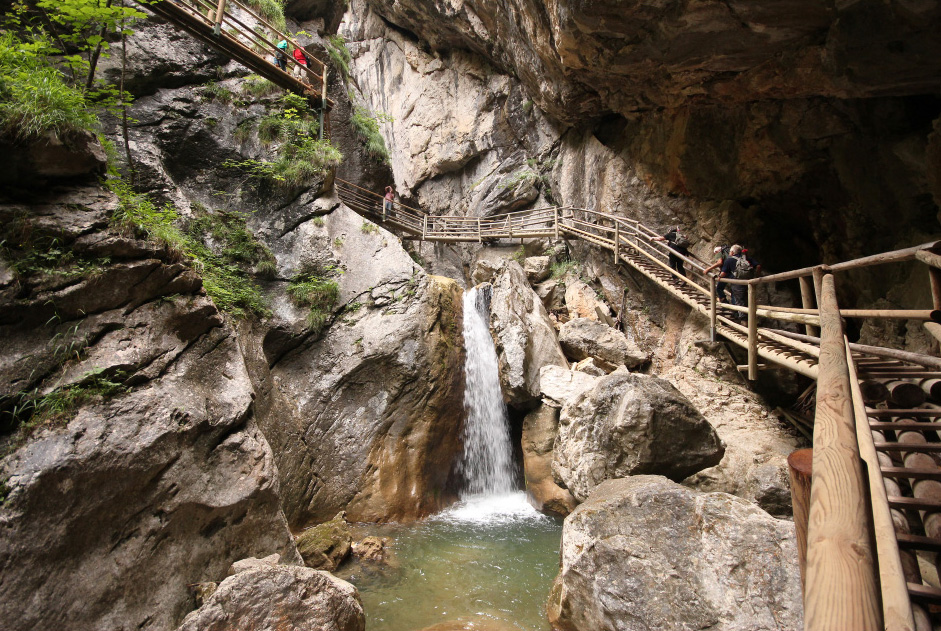
- Walkways across a waterfall

- Location within Austria
- Floor elevation: 750 m (2,460 ft)
- Depth: 300 m (980 ft)

Geology
- Age: 400 Myr

Geography
- Country: Austria
- State: Styria
- District: Pernegg an der Mur
- Coordinates: 47°20′31″N 15°23′41″E
- River: Mixnitzbach ("Mixnitz Creek")

Location
- Natural monument Bärenschützklamm is adjacent to the Mur Valley.

The Bärenschützklamm ("Bärenschütz Gorge") is a narrow valley in the Graz Highlands in the Austrian Central Alps. It was carved out of limestone by the Mixnitzbach ("Mixnitz Creek") and is a popular tourist destination.

After a deadly rockfall in July 2020 it was closed until September 2024.

== Name ==
Bären-Schütz-Klamm literally translates to "bear protection gorge" or "bear marksman gorge". The name is derived from the Slavic *pršica, meaning "gushing stream".

== Location and Geography ==
The Bärenschützklamm lies roughly 1 kilometre (0.62 mi) east of the village of Mixnitz, part of the municipality of Pernegg an der Mur, Styria.

It was carved by the Mixnitzbach ("Mixnitz Creek"), which originates at 1,416 metres (4,646 ft) above the Adriatic, passes through a small lake at the Teichalm ("Pond Alm") and then passes through the gorge as a series of waterfalls. It then joins the river Mur, which eventually joins the Danube via the Drava.

It was declared a natural monument in 1978 and today is part of the IUCN recognized protected landscape "Almenland".

== Tourism ==
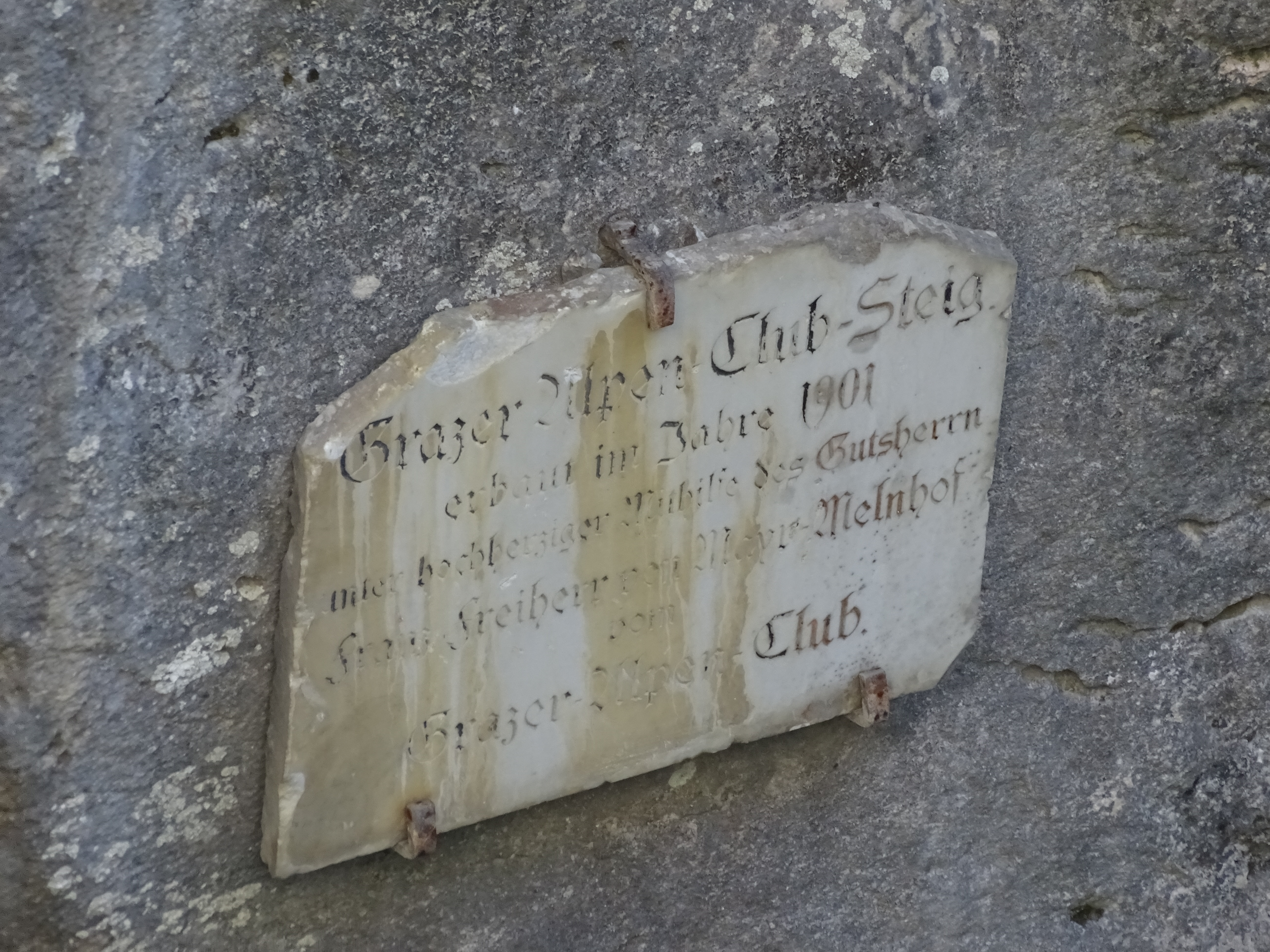
Plaque commemorating the construction of the first walkway in 1901.

The first route through the gorge was constructed in 1901 by the Grazer Alpen Club ("Graz Alpine Club").

Today, it is traversed by a 1.3-kilometre (0.81 mi) trail using numerous mostly wooden bridges and 164 ladders. Gaining a total 350 metres (1,150 ft) of elevation, the hike takes roughly 1.5 hours. Having reached the top, hikers either return via a hiking path ("Prügelweg"), proceed to Hochlantsch mountain or visit one of the two restaurants.

The infrastructure within the canyon is maintained by the local chapter of the Austrian Alpine Club, who in turn charges a fee for entering the gorge.

Before its closure it received about 40,000 visitors annually. Concerns about overcrowding had been raised in 2019. During the reconstruction phase after 2020 rockfalls, a new parking lot was constructed. Located next to the highway, a 30 minute hike from the gorge, it is supposed to lessen the number of cars in the village. The existing parking lot adjacent to the gorge will remain in place, although at a higher price point.

== 2020 Rockfall and Reconstruction ==
At noon on 8 July 2020, several large pieces of rock fell onto a walkway and wooden ladders below, killing three and injuring nine others. Four helicopters and 70 – 100 personnel of mountain rescue services, the Austrian Red Cross, police, fire brigade and military were involved in emergency operations. Initially believed to have caused only two fatalities, a third victim was found two days later in a deep pool, after being reported missing by his flatmates. The gorge was closed to the public immediately.

In November 2020, the public prosecutor terminated investigations and declared the rockfall an "unforeseeable act of nature". One of the injured hikers filed a civil suit against the Austrian Alpine Club, seeking damages.

In February 2023, a new safety concept was approved by local authorities after having rejected a previous one on environmental concerns. It is planned to place ten steel nets above sections of the route, and to inspect all walkways and ladders and replace them as needed. The expected costs rose several times from an initial 650,000 to 1.5 million euros by October 2023. The increase was attributed to one third of walkways being in need of replacement and necessary replanning of some sections.

It was reopened to the public in September 2024.

== See also ==
- Drachenhöhle
