= Othenio Abel =

Austrian paleontologist and biologist (1875-1946)

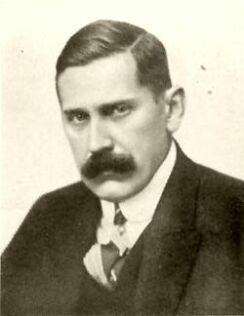
- Born: 20 June 1875; Vienna
- Died: 4 July 1946 (aged 71); Mondsee
- Awards: Bigsby Medal (1911); Daniel Giraud Elliot Medal (1920)
- Scientific career
- Fields: Paleontology

Othenio Lothar Franz Anton Louis Abel (20 June 1875 – 4 July 1946) was an Austrian paleontologist and evolutionary biologist. Together with Louis Dollo, he was the founder of "paleobiology" and studied the life and environment of fossilized organisms.

== Life ==
Abel was born in Vienna, the son of the architect Lothar Abel. Abel earned a PhD, after studying both law and science, from the University of Vienna. He remained there as an assistant to Alpine geologist Eduard Suess, before being appointed a professor of paleontology. Three years later, he finished his habilitation thesis as a paleontologist at the University of Vienna. From 1900 to 1907, he worked at the Geologische Reichsanstalt.

In 1907, Abel became an extraordinary professor in Vienna, and from 1917 to 1934 he was a regular professor of paleontology in Vienna. As such, he led several expeditions that gave him broad recognition, such as the Pikermi-expedition to Greece in 1912, an American expedition (1925) and one to South Africa (1929). Abel became a member of the Leopoldina academy in 1935. From 1935 to 1940, he was a professor at Göttingen University, after which he was retired, age 61.

In 1942, he was appointed an honorary member of the Paläontologische Gesellschaft; this honor was revoked in 2024 due to his associations with National Socialism.

== Scientific activity ==
Abel mainly studied fossil vertebrates. He was a supporter of Neo-Lamarckist evolution. His main contribution to the field, however, was the formulation, together with Louis Dollo, of paleobiology, which combines the methods and findings of the life science and earth science to reconstruct the biology of fossil organisms. From 1928 onwards, Othenio Abel was the publisher of a journal dedicated to paleobiology, Paläobiologica.

In 1914, Abel proposed that fossil dwarf elephants inspired the myth of giant Cyclopes, because the center nasal opening was thought to be a cyclopic eye socket. In 1920 he was awarded the Daniel Giraud Elliot Medal from the National Academy of Sciences. He also showed great interest in cave bear remains at the so-called "Dragon's Cave" near Mixnitz.

Abel was an advocate of orthogenesis, he believed that there were trends in evolution that were internally programmed.

== Political attitude and National Socialism ==
Already as a student, Abel took part in antisemitic riots at the University of Vienna, during the Badeni-crisis of 1897. After the First World War, now a professor, he gave voice to his fear of a power takeover by "Communists, Social Democrats and Jews and more Jews tied to both". As the journalist Klaus Taschwer publicized in 2012, Abel was responsible for the founding of a secret group of 18 professors that sought to frustrate the research and careers of left-wing and Jewish scientists. The rise in violence of National Socialist student groups towards Jewish students in 1934 were met with sympathy by Abel. When such attacks began to be directed at Catholic and international students as well, Abel, now the university rector, was forced into early retirement by the Austrofascist board. This caused him to emigrate to Germany and accept the post in Göttingen.

He visited Vienna again in 1939, after the Anschluss with Nazi Germany. After seeing how the Nazi flag was shown at the university building, he pronounced this the "Happiest moment of his life". The new regime honored him with the newly created post of "Honorary Senator" of the university - an honour that was rescinded after the Second World War, in 1945. A letter of recommendation for the Goethe Prize points out how Abel had always "fought in the first line" against the "Judaification" of the university. After the war, he was once again forced into retirement along with other prominent Nazi professors and spent his last days in Mondsee, then known as something of a "Nazi colony".

== Selected writings ==
- Einige Monstrositäten bei Orchideenblüthen (1897)
- Ueber einige Ophrydeen (1898)
- Les dauphins longirostres du boldérien (miocène supérieur) des environs d'Anvers. Brussels 1901 - 1931 doi:10.5962/bhl.title.16053
- Les odontocètes du Boldérien (miocène supérieur) d'Anvers. Brüssel 1905 doi:10.5962/bhl.title.15923
- Fossile Flugfische (1906)
- "Neuere Anschauungen über den Bau und die Lebensweise der Dinosaurier." Berichte der Sektion für Paläozoologie 16. Dezemb (1908): 117–22.
- Die Morphologie der Hüftbeinrudimente der Cetaceen. Vienna 1907 doi:10.5962/bhl.title.16064
- "Die Rekonstruktion des Diplodocus." Abhandlungen der K.K. Zoologisch-botanischen Gesellschaft in Wien 5 (1910).
- "Über die allgemeinen Prinzipien der paläontologischen Rekonstruktion." 'Verhandlungen der zoologisch-botanische Gesellschaft zu Wien LX (1910): 141–46.
- "Die Vorfahren der Vögel und ihre Lebensweise." Verhandlungen der zoologisch-botanische Gesellschaft zu Wien LXI (1911): 144–91.
- Grundzüge der Paläobiologie der Wirbeltiere. Stuttgart 1912 doi:10.5962/bhl.title.61833
- Vorzeitliche Säugetiere. Jena 1914
- Die Tiere Der Vorwelt. Leipzig & Berlin 1914.
- Die Paläontologie in Forschung und Lehre. Naturwissenschaften 3 (1915), 413-19
- Paläobiologie der Cephalopoden aus der Gruppe der Dibranchiaten Jena 1916. doi:10.5962/bhl.title.46089
- Die Stämme der Wirbeltiere. Berlin, Leipzig, 1919 doi:10.5962/bhl.title.2114
- Lehrbuch der Paläozoologie. Jena 1920
- Lebensbilder aus der Tierwelt der Vorzeit. Jena 1921 doi:10.5962/bhl.title.61701
- Geschichte und Methode der Rekonstruktion vorzeitlicher Wirbeltiere. Jena 1925
- Paläobiologie und Stammesgeschichte. Jena 1929
- Die Stellung des Menschen im Rahmen der Wirbeltiere. 1931
- Vorzeitliche Lebensspuren. Jena 1935
- Die Tiere der Vorzeit in ihrem Lebensraum. Jena 1939
- Vorzeitliche Tierreste im Deutschen Mythus, Brauchtum und Volksglauben. Jena 1939
