= Prostiboř =

- Municipality
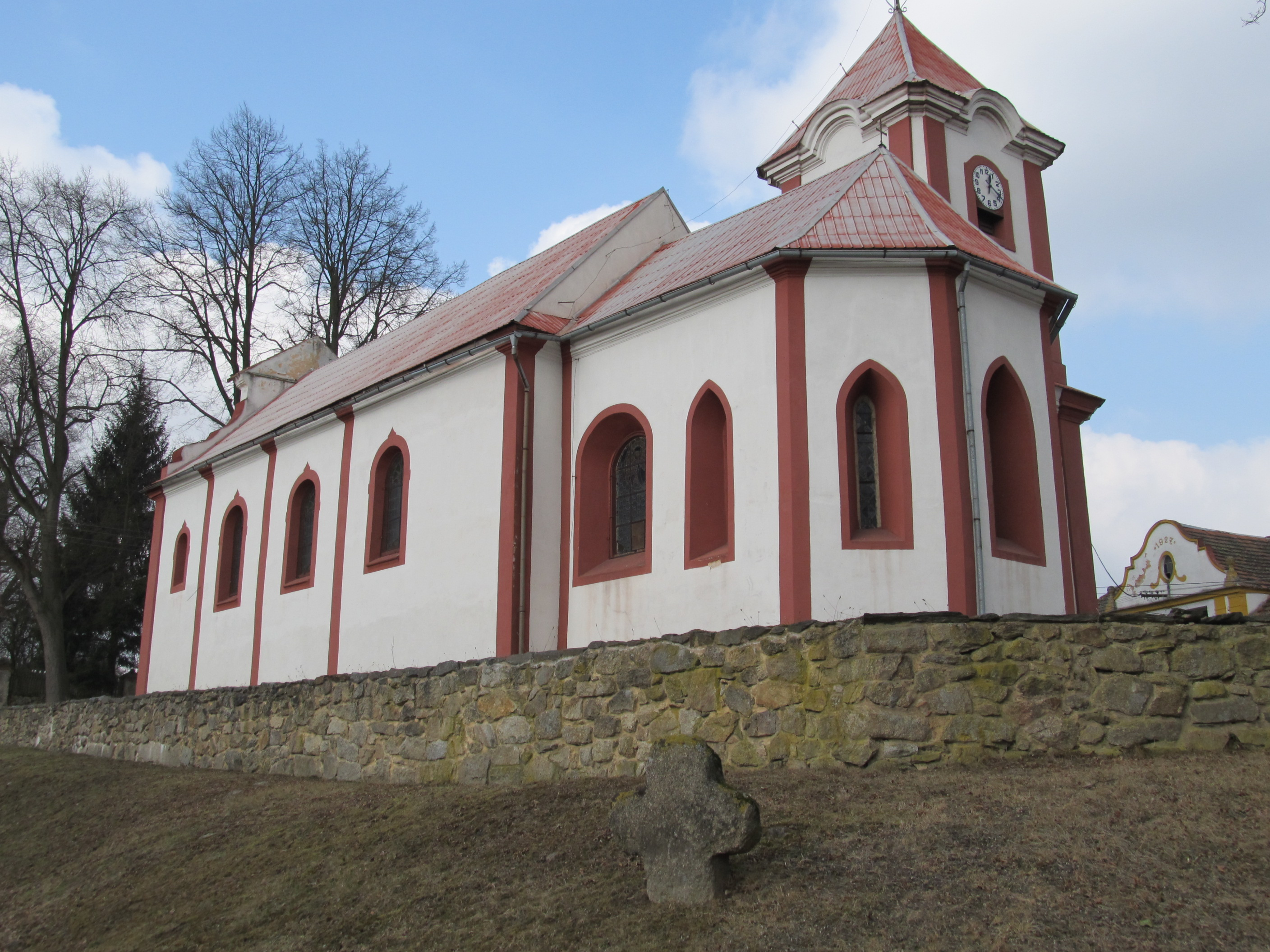
- Church of Saint Nicholas

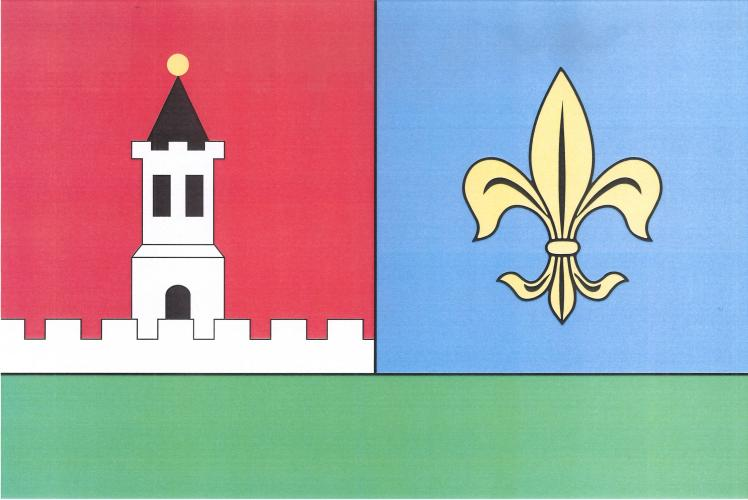
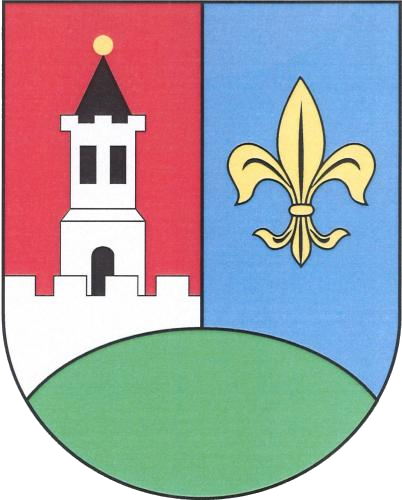
- Flag Coat of arms

- Location in the Czech Republic
- Coordinates: 49°39′14″N 12°53′56″E
- Country: Czech Republic
- Region: Plzeň
- District: Tachov
- First mentioned: 1115

Area
  - Total: 10.35 km^{2} (4.00 sq mi)
- Elevation: 430 m (1,410 ft)

Population (2026-01-01)
  - Total: 249
  - Density: 24.1/km^{2} (62.3/sq mi)
- Time zone: UTC+1 (CET)
  - Summer (DST): UTC+2 (CEST)
- Postal code: 349 01
- Website: www.obecprostibor.cz

Prostiboř is a municipality and village in Tachov District in the Plzeň Region of the Czech Republic. It has about 200 inhabitants.

Prostiboř lies approximately 26 kilometres (16 mi) south-east of Tachov, 36 km (22 mi) west of Plzeň, and 119 km (74 mi) south-west of Prague.

== Administrative division ==
Prostiboř consists of three municipal parts (in brackets population according to the 2021 census):

- Prostiboř (105)
- Kopec (4)
- Telice (45)

== Demographics ==
Historical population
Year	Pop.	±%
1869	772	—
1880	741	−4.0%
1890	722	−2.6%
1900	664	−8.0%
1910	673	+1.4%
1921	668	−0.7%
1930	577	−13.6%
1950	246	−57.4%
1961	264	+7.3%
1970	203	−23.1%
1980	188	−7.4%
1991	155	−17.6%
2001	153	−1.3%
2011	139	−9.2%
2021	154	+10.8%
Source: Censuses

== Notable people ==
- Isaak Löw Hofmann, Edler von Hofmannsthal (1759–1849), Austrian merchant
