= Edward Hoffman =

Edward or Ed Hoffman may refer to:

- Edward J. Hoffman (1942–2004), American inventor
- Tex Hoffman (Edward Adolph Hoffman, 1893–1947), Major League Baseball 3rd baseman
- Edward George Hoffman (1877–1931), Democratic National Committee member from Indiana
- Edward L. Hoffman, United States Army Air Service pilot who helped develop the parachute
- Ed Hoffman (died 2014), American football coach

== See also ==
- Ede Reményi (Eduard Hoffmann, 1828–1898), Hungarian violinist
