= Why Did Europe Conquer the World =

2015 book by Philip T. Hoffman

Why Did Europe Conquer the World?
- Cover of the 2015 Princeton University Press edition
- Author: Philip T. Hoffman
- Language: English
- Series: The Princeton Economic History of the Western World
- Subject: Military history, economic history, Great Divergence
- Genre: Non-fiction
- Set in: Eurasia, c. 1400–1914
- Publisher: Princeton University Press
- Publication date: 30 June 2015
- Media type: Print (hardcover and paperback), e-book
- Pages: 272
- ISBN: 978-0-691-13970-8 (hardcover)
- Dewey Decimal: 355.02094
- LC Class: D208 .H64 2015

Why Did Europe Conquer the World? is a 2015 book by the American economic historian Philip T. Hoffman, published by Princeton University Press. (Note: The work is part of the Princeton Economic History of the Western World series.) Hoffman tries to explain why Western Europeans, rather than the Chinese, Japanese, Ottomans, or South Asians, came to rule most of the world. His answer is that European politics pushed rulers to develop gunpowder weapons further than anyone else in Eurasia. By his estimates, territory that Europeans controlled or had once controlled came to some 35 percent of the world's land surface in 1800 and 84 percent in 1914. Because so much of it was taken before industrialization, he dates the decisive military advantage to the early modern period. The book was listed among the Bloomberg Businessweek's Best Books of 2015.

== Background and origins ==
Hoffman's earlier books were on early modern France: Growth in a Traditional Society (1996), on the countryside between 1450 and 1815, and, with Gilles Postel-Vinay and Jean-Laurent Rosenthal, Priceless Markets (2000), on credit in Paris before the arrival of banks, and Surviving Large Losses (2007), on financial crises and the development of capital markets. In a Q&A piece published by Princeton University Press, Hoffman said that historians, social scientists and biologists had all sought to explain why major powers arise, "so far without success", and that the question mattered because its answer "determined who had colonies, who ran the slave trade, and who grew rich or remained mired in poverty". His own conclusions, he said, came from using "a simple economic model of political costs and technological change" to find the point at which the guns, ships, tactics and fortifications of the gunpowder technology would be improved.

== Summary ==
Hoffman finds the standard explanations insufficient. Disease cannot account for conquests in Asia, where populations shared the Europeans' immunities, and crediting superior gunpowder weapons only restates the puzzle, since firearms were invented in China and were available across Eurasia. He also disputes the argument of Paul Kennedy and Jared Diamond that constant war and political fragmentation were sufficient on their own: eighteenth-century India was at war almost continuously and fought with gunpowder weapons, yet succession disputes devalued the spoils, its rulers could not pry money loose from local elites, and its innovations came from the West. His own model considers early modern warfare as a repeated tournament. Rulers spend resources to win a prize that cannot be shared, such as glory, territory, trade advantages, rights of succession, or victory over enemies of the faith, and the fighting improves their weapons through learning by doing. Four conditions must hold together for the technology to advance: evenly matched rulers must fight often; a valuable prize and politically cheap taxes and recruits must lead them to spend heavily; they must rely on gunpowder rather than on older technologies; and they must be able to copy innovations freely, including their enemies'. Only in Western Europe, Hoffman argues, did all four hold without interruption between about 1400 and 1800. In the 1780s France was devoting more than 7 percent of GDP to war and Britain 12 percent, well over twice the Chinese level; the rate of fire of French infantry rose tenfold between 1600 and 1750, and weapons grew cheaper relative to other manufactured goods.

A unified China was large enough to deter rival states. Its emperors fought as often as European monarchs, but usually against nomads, and in those wars mounted archers remained more effective than firearms. Japanese warlords took up firearms quickly during the civil wars of the sixteenth century and devised new siege and infantry tactics, but unification under the Tokugawa shogunate removed the competition that had driven them. The Ottoman Empire divided its resources among cavalry, galleys, and gunpowder weapons, and because the janissaries spared its sultans any need to bargain with local elites, the Ottoman state never obtained the permanent taxes that such bargaining eventually gave European kings. Russia, whose Tsars could conscript serfs, joined the ranks of the great powers as the Ottomans left them. Falling behind in this one technology, Hoffman reminds, did not make these societies poorer or otherwise inferior. He traces the divergence to political history, which shaped each region through the short-run "political learning" of individual rulers and through slower cultural evolution, and to Western Christianity, whose independent papacy helped keep any one ruler from reuniting Europe. He rejects geographical explanations, and cites terrain data showing China to be the more mountainous, and finds no support for the idea that Europe's intermarried dynasties spared defeated monarchs, since rulers elsewhere in Eurasia fared no worse.

Hoffman also asks why so much of the early conquest was carried out by private adventurers rather than by royal armies. European entrepreneurs could buy guns, hire veterans, and raise money through the joint-stock company, while their counterparts abroad met bans on foreign travel and trade in China and Japan, restrictions on private firearms in China and the Ottoman Empire, and an Islamic commercial law under which a partnership dissolved on a partner's death. In the nineteenth century glory and trade monopolies lost their hold and disputed prizes became easier to divide, leaving Europe in an armed peace. Even so, fiscal reform, conscription, and a growing stock of useful knowledge carried weapons development forward faster than before, now through research as much as through fighting. Conquest, according to Hoffman, brought ordinary Europeans little benefit, reminding readers how the British Empire ran at a loss between 1880 and 1912. He opposes the view that war and empire caused the British Industrial Revolution, crediting human capital and political institutions instead. The outcome was not inevitable: had Charlemagne's empire survived, or the Mongols never conquered China, world history might have run very differently.

== Awards or honors ==
- Listed among the Bloomberg Businessweek's Best Books of 2015

== Reviews ==
John Darwin called the book "an exceptionally stimulating intervention" in the debate over the great divergence and "a major contribution to the still pioneering field of comparative global history". The tournament model, he thought, escaped the tautology of explaining Europe's success by Europe's success, since it yielded a test that could be applied to China, the Ottoman Empire, Mughal India and Japan on the same terms. He was less persuaded that the appetite of European rulers for glory and commercial gain was the main source of their aggression. The recurring pursuit of hegemony, and the need to resist it, seemed to him a better explanation of Europe's wars. Nor, he argued, did the tournament or Europe's political history explain why the private ventures that carried out much of the overseas conquest were undertaken at all. Apart from some inland parts of Central and South America, he added, the scope of European conquest before 1750 was strikingly narrow.

Walter Scheidel admired the book's comparative range and its documentation of gains in weapons productivity that far outpaced economic growth: "Europe's breakthrough was as narrow as it was lethal." He was less convinced by the account of how Europe came to have the peculiarities that made this possible. Hoffman was right, in his view, to reject the old claim that rugged terrain and irregular coastlines had produced Europe's political diversity, but went too far in setting geography and ecology aside in favour of purely cultural explanation. Scheidel called western Europe's distance from the Eurasian steppe and its mobile warrior confederations "a simple function of geography", one that made the region less likely to be conquered, or to develop the empires and specialised tactics needed to fend the steppe peoples off, and so allowed competitive polycentrism to survive there. The objection was a quibble, he added; he described the book as "a milestone in the perennial debate about the reasons for the 'rise of the West'".

Jari Eloranta placed Hoffman among the grand theorists of development, alongside Jared Diamond, Charles Tilly and David Landes, and found the comparative revenue figures and the account of Chinese stagnation convincing, though the data for China and other non-European states struck him as necessarily patchy. The model seemed to him less all-encompassing than Hoffman claimed, complementing rather than displacing explanations that rest on geography and climate. The proposed link between military productivity and the Industrial Revolution he found harder to verify, since crowding-out effects could not be ignored, and he thought Hoffman said too little about how wars were paid for: borrowing cheaply from domestic merchants and markets had, in his view, given the Dutch and the British a huge advantage once Europe entered the era of total war at the end of the eighteenth century. Raw materials were discounted too, among them the coal whose distance from China's growing cities Kenneth Pomeranz had made a major hindrance to Chinese industrialisation. These were small reservations, he wrote, beside a book he called "a classic of economic history" and thought should be required reading.

Guillaume Daudin found the formal model borrowed from labour economics "more of a distraction than a support to the argument", useful perhaps for clarifying Hoffman's own thinking and rightly confined to appendices. Violent, glory-hungry elites make unlikely utility-maximising agents weighing the costs and benefits of war, he wrote, and the model's premise that Ottoman and European rulers contended for the same prize was hard to square with Hoffman's own narrative, in which glory was worth more to European monarchs than to their rivals. His objection was to the rhetoric rather than the substance: he called the book a masterful treatment of its question, welcomed the room it left for contingency, and said he had learned a great deal from the comparative chapters.

Joseph McQuade credited Hoffman with refuting many of the older explanations resting on geography, epidemic disease or the sheer frequency of war, and with showing that what mattered was the character of western European warfare rather than how often it occurred; on this reading European dominance was the product of historical accident rather than innate advantage. He welcomed the confinement of the denser modelling to appendices that a general reader could skip. He suspected that some historians would find Hoffman's method (i.e. an economic historian's reliance on secondary sources and formal models) unfamiliar. His main complaint was that the modern period was treated hurriedly, only the final chapter covering the nineteenth century. Hoffman does adapt the tournament model to the "armed peace" of the long nineteenth century, but on his own figures European and former European territories grew from 35 to 84 per cent of the globe between 1800 and 1914.

Peter Turchin began his review in The Historian sceptical, given how much had already been written on the rise of the West, and ended it judging Hoffman's answer "the best argued and empirically supported of the current crop". What persuaded him was the method: mathematical theory paired with empirical tests of its assumptions and predictions, and an engagement with cultural evolution that he thought rare among economists. He did not accept that European rulers glorified war more than rulers elsewhere, asking whether Chinggis Khan, Timur or Toyotomi Hideyoshi had glorified it any less than Louis XIV or Frederick the Great. He was confident that a comparative study using sources in non-European languages would show that glory had not been a peculiarly European motive for war.

=== In French ===
In a French review, Jeremy Hayhoe wrote that the divergence at issue is military rather than economic or industrial, and that Hoffman refuses to make the tournament the main cause of industrialisation: war was the spark of the technical progress that led to the Industrial Revolution, but human capital, political institutions and the fiscal and judicial systems supplied the fuel that set English growth going. The comparative material was for Hayhoe one of the book's strengths. In none of the three cases he focused on did rulers have much reason to develop gunpowder technology: China's wars were mostly fought against nomads, and even its victories with gunpowder weapons came against enemies so outmatched that no innovation was called for. the Ottomans skirmished with Persians and Tatars on their frontiers. And the prizes available to India's warring leaders were too small to justify the cost. The importance of Europe's division into states of comparable strength was not itself a new observation, he wrote, citing Jean-Laurent Rosenthal and R. Bin Wong, and Joel Mokyr's account of a tournament of ideas driving scientific progress. What made the book indispensable, in his view, was that it tied that observation to military history, to Europe's political peculiarities and to econometric measurement.
