= Huffman (surname) =

Huffman is a Bohemian American surname likely derived from the German surname "Hoffman".

Notable people with the surname include:

- Alaina Huffman (born 1980), Canadian actress
- Benjamine Huffman, American government official
- Berl Huffman (1907–1990), American college sports coach
- Booker Huffman (born 1965), American professional wrestler better known as Booker T
- Cady Huffman (born 1965), American actress
- Dave Huffman, former NFL player
- David Huffman, American actor
- David Huffman (artist), contemporary American artist
- David A. Huffman, creator of Huffman coding
- Donald Huffman, American physicist
- Felicity Huffman (born 1962), American actress
- George Huffman (1862–1897), American businessman
- James W. Huffman, United States Senator from Ohio (1945–1946)
- Jared Huffman, United States Representative from California (2013–present)
- Jason Huffman, American politician
- Jim Huffman, law professor and candidate for United States Senate from Oregon
- John W. Huffman, professor emeritus of organic chemistry at Clemson University who first synthesised many novel cannabinoids
- Kathy Rae Huffman, art curator for video art, new media art, online and interactive art, based in California, USA.
- Kurt Huffman, American politician
- Lash Huffman (born 1960), American professional wrestler better known as Stevie Ray; brother of Booker T
- Laton Alton Huffman (1854–1931) was an American photographer of Frontier and Native American life
- Maven Huffman (born 1976), American professional wrestler often known by his first name only
- Nate Huffman (1975–2015), American basketball player, 2001 Israeli Basketball Premier League MVP
- Robert Huffman (born 1968), former American stock car racing driver
- Robert E. Huffman, American scientist and author
- Rosanna Huffman (1938–2016), American actress
- Scott Huffman (born 1964), American pole-vaulting champion
- Shirley Huffman (1928–2018), American politician
- Steve Huffman (born 1983/1984), American web developer and entrepreneur
