= Evangelical Church of Hessen Electorate-Waldeck =

Church in Germany

Evangelical Church of Hesse Electorate-Waldeck
- Evangelische Kirche von Kurhessen-Waldeck
- Abbreviation: EKKW
- Type: Landeskirche, member of the Evangelical Church in Germany
- Classification: Protestant
- Orientation: United Protestant (Lutheran & Reformed)
- Leader: Bishop Beate Hofmann
- Associations: Union Evangelischer Kirchen, Reformed Alliance
- Region: ~ 10.000 km² in northern and eastern Hesse, Schmalkalden in Thuringia
- Headquarters: Kassel, Germany
- Origin: 1934
- Merger of: Evangelical Churches of Hesse-Kassel and Waldeck
- Members: 666.489 (2025); 36,5% of total population
- Official website: https://www.ekkw.de/

The Evangelical Church of Hesse Electorate-Waldeck (German: Evangelische Kirche von Kurhessen-Waldeck; EKKW) is a United Protestant church body in former Hesse-Cassel and the Waldeck part of the former Free State of Waldeck-Pyrmont.

== Constitution ==
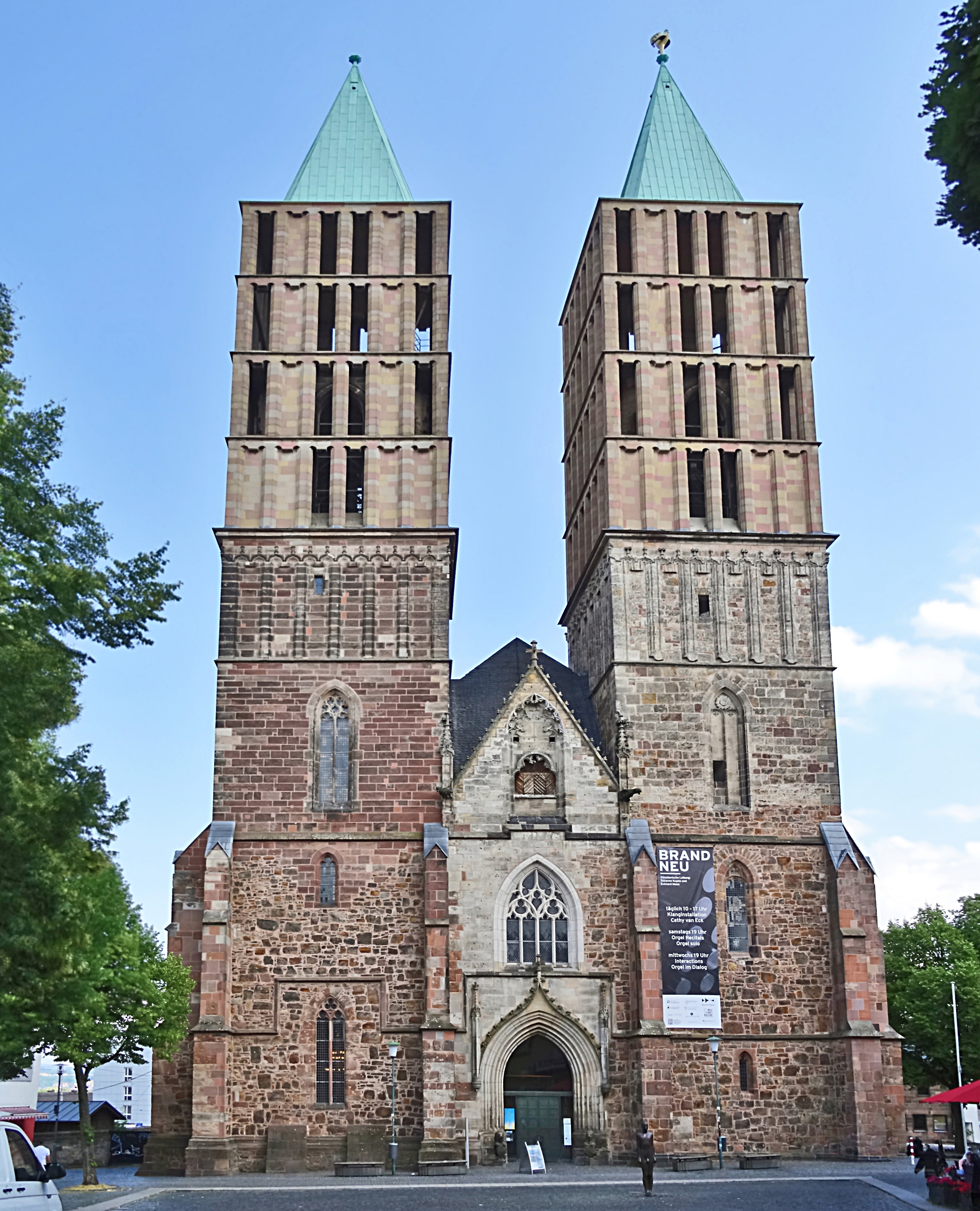
St. Martin's Church in Kassel

The EKKW is a full member of the Evangelical Church in Germany (EKD) and the Reformed Alliance, and is based on the teachings presented by Martin Luther during the Reformation. Since October 1, 2019, the bishop is Beate Hofmann. The bishop's preaching venue is St. Martin's Church in Kassel. It's a Protestant church united in administration, comprising Lutheran, Reformed (Calvinist), and Protestant union congregations upholding Calvinist (Reformed) and Lutheran traditions. The Evangelical Church of Hesse Electorate-Waldeck is one of 20 churches within the EKD.

== Bishops ==
- 1924–1934: Heinrich Möller
- June–December 1934: Karl Theys
- 1935–1945: Friedrich Happich,
- 1945–1963: Adolf Wüstemann
- 1963–1978: Erich Vellmer
- 1978–1991: Hans-Gernot Jung
- 1991–1992: Erhard Giesler
- 1992–2000: Christian Zippert
- 2000–2019: Martin Hein
- 2019–: Beate Hofmann

== History ==
The Evangelical Church of Hesse Electorate-Waldeck was founded in 1934 through a merger of two other formerly independent churches: the Evangelical Church of Hesse-Kassel and the Evangelical State Church of Waldeck and Pyrmont (Waldeck part).

== Practices ==
Ordination of women and blessing of same-sex marriages were allowed.

== Sources ==
- Michael Hederich: Um die Freiheit der Kirche. Geschichte der Evangelischen Kirche von Kurhessen-Waldeck. Evangelischer Presseverband Kurhessen-Waldeck, Kassel 1972 (Monographia Hassiae 1, ISSN 0720-4671).
- Sebastian Parker: Die Marburger Konferenz. Fusionspläne und Zusammenarbeit hessischer evangelischer Landeskirchen im 20. Jahrhundert. Verlag der Hessische Kirchengeschichtlichen Vereinigung, Darmstadt u. a. 2008, ISBN 978-3-931849-28-3 (Quellen und Studien zur hessischen Kirchengeschichte 16), (Zugleich: Darmstadt, Techn. Hochsch., Magisterarbeit, 2004).
- Karl Schilling: Der Zusammenschluss der Landeskirchen Waldeck und Hessen-Kassel. In: Waldeckischer Landeskalender. 2009 (2008), ZDB-ID 513652–0, S. 80–92.
- Dieter Waßmann: Waldeck. Geschichte einer Landeskirche. Evangelischer Presseverband Kurhessen-Waldeck, Kassel 1984, ISBN 3-920310-40-3 (Monographia Hassiae 10).
