= Ingrid Kaiserfeld =

Austrian operatic soprano

Ingrid Kaiserfeld (born 16 January 1961) is an Austrian operatic soprano. She is best known as a Mozart interpreter, especially for her "Queen of the Night" (The Magic Flute), which she sang over 80 times.

== Life ==
=== Youth ===
Born in Pernegg an der Mur, Kaiserfeld completed her studies at the Graz Musikhochschule. Initially active as a concert singer, she switched to the opera stage in Graz after a few years. There, after her debut as "Lisa" (The Land of Smiles), she sang "Nedda" (Pagliacci), "Lucia" (Lucia di Lammermoor) and "Irene" (Belisario), among others. In Graz, she achieved her first career highlights as "Gilda (Rigoletto) and "Donna Anna" (Don Giovanni), which were received with great praise by the press and the public. From 1998 onwards, she was an ensemble member of the Vienna State Opera, where she sang, among others, the "1st Lady" (the Magic Flute), "Musetta" (La Bohème) and "Rosalinde" (Die Fledermaus). Since 2002, she has been a freelance artist. In the 2012/13 academic year, Kaiserfeld took on a singing professorship at the Hochschule für Musik und Theater in Munich.

=== International performances ===
In 2001, her first "Queen of the Night" (The Magic Flute) took place in Basel. The critic of the NZZ wrote: '... the fairy tale characters suddenly become human beings. This applies... to the Queen of the Night, who fights as much for her daughter as for her power. Ingrid Kaiserfeld has the vocal range for both, lyrical warmth and coloratura brilliance." She subsequently sang this role also in Frankfurt, at the Mozart Festival La Coruna (May 2003), at the Deutsche Oper Berlin, in Toulouse and the Vienna State Opera, in Lyon and Opera Bastille (both in 2004) and finally in 2005 in a new production under Claudio Abbado in Italy and Germany (Festspielhaus Baden-Baden) and at the Teatro Regio di Torino (2006). This brought Kaiserfeld the attention she needed to establish herself primarily as a Mozart interpreter. This was followed by roles such as "Donna Anna" (Don Giovanni) at the Glyndebourne Opera Festival under Louis Langree and in the Konwitschny production at the Komische Oper Berlin. Quote: "Ingrid Kaiserfeld as 'Donna Anna', a coloratura soprano full of radiant beauty ...a delight to listen to.". This was followed by "Fauno" (Ascanio in Alba) in Bologna in 2005 and "Vitellia" (La clemenza di Tito) in Caen in 2006, "Konstanze" in (Die Entführung aus dem Serail) at the Maggio Musicale Fiorentino under Zubin Mehta, at the Mozart Festival La Coruna under Jesús López Cobos, at the Frankfurt Opera under J. Jones, at the Bayerische Staatsoper Munich under Daniel Harding, at the Finnish National Opera and Ballet under Ralf Weikert and at the Staatsoper Unter den Linden Berlin under the conduct of Sebastian Weigle. In 2007, she sang her first "Elettra" (Idomeneo) at the Theater an der Wien.

Apart from her Mozart repertoire, her debut came in 2004 in Der Rosenkavalier at the Salzburg Festival. In August 2007, she received an invitation to the International Festival of Sacred Music in Riga for the Verdi Requiem conducted by Giorgio Morandi. This was followed in November 2007 by "Rosalinde" in a new production of Die Fledermaus by J. Strauss directed by Christian Boesch in the Teatro Municipal of Santiago de Chile.

In 2008, she recorded a CD - Missa Solemnis by Beethoven - with Gustav Kuhn.
