= Jacob Hoffman (musician) =

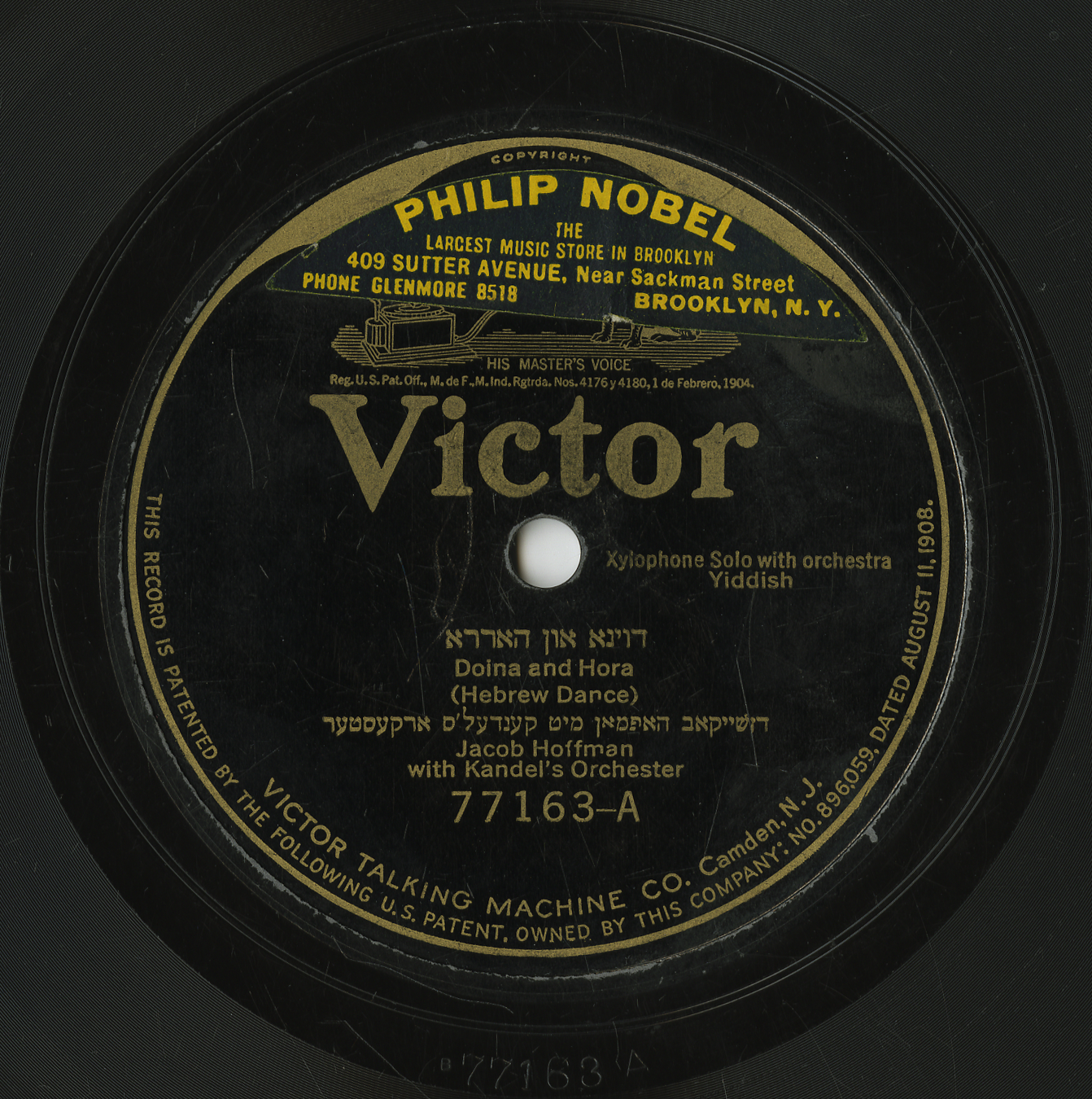
Jacob Hoffman "Doina and Hora" 1924

Jacob "Jakie" Hoffman (Yiddish: יעקב האָפמאַן, c. 1897–1974) was a Russian-born American Klezmer and orchestral musician, recording artist, and Xylophone player. He played and recorded with Harry Kandel, Philadelphia klezmer bandleaders of the interwar era, and was the father of Klezmer percussionist Elaine Hoffman Watts and grandfather of Trumpet player Susan Watts.

== Biography ==
Hoffman was born in the late 1890s in Bohopil (Bogopol), Podolia Governorate, Russian Empire (today Pervomaisk, Mykolaiv Oblast, Ukraine). His father, Joseph Hoffman, was also a musician, and his mother was named Rebecca (née Kaplin). Jacob learned a broad klezmer and Hasidic music repertoire from his father, as did his brothers. The family emigrated to the United States in June 1904, settling in Philadelphia.

During World War I he worked as a musician at the Arch Street Theatre; he also played xylophone on the Keith Vaudeville Circuit. His first solo recording was made for Victor in 1917, where he recorded klezmer music on xylophone accompanied by a small orchestra. The following year he also recorded a xylophone solo in a larger medley by Harry Kandel's orchestra. He soon became a popular Klezmer musician in the Philadelphia Jewish wedding world.

In June 1922 Hoffman married Bessie Marks. In 1923 he made another klezmer disc for Victor Records. After that his recording career seems to have ended, but he continued on as a popular musician in Philadelphia and on tour around the United States for the following decades.

In the 1950 season Hoffman joined the Philadelphia Orchestra as a percussionist. He stayed for two seasons, leaving in 1952. Other orchestras he performed and toured with in the 1950s included the Fiedler Orchestra, the Ballet Russe de Monte-Carlo, and the D'Oyly Carte Opera Company.

Hoffman died in Philadelphia of a heart attack on March 20, 1974. He was buried in the Mount Sharon Cemetery in Springfield Township.

His daughter Elaine Hoffman Watts, a drummer, became an important figure of the Klezmer revival, as did her daughter Trumpet player Susan Watts.
