= Nadine Hoffman =

Teams
- Peoria Redwings (1946)

Career highlights and awards
- Women in Baseball – AAGPBL Permanent Display at the Baseball Hall of Fame and Museum (unveiled in 1988)

Nadine Hoffman was an All-American Girls Professional Baseball League player.

Nadine Hoffman played in two games for the Peoria Redwings club in the 1946 season. She went hitless in four at bats. Additional information is incomplete because there are no records available at the time of the request.

The All-American Girls Professional Baseball League folded in 1954, but there is a permanent display at the Baseball Hall of Fame and Museum at Cooperstown, New York, since 1988 that honors the entire league rather than any individual figure. She holds bachelor's degree from Gettysburg College and a master's degree in journalism from Emerson College.
