= Pernegg an der Mur =

- Municipality
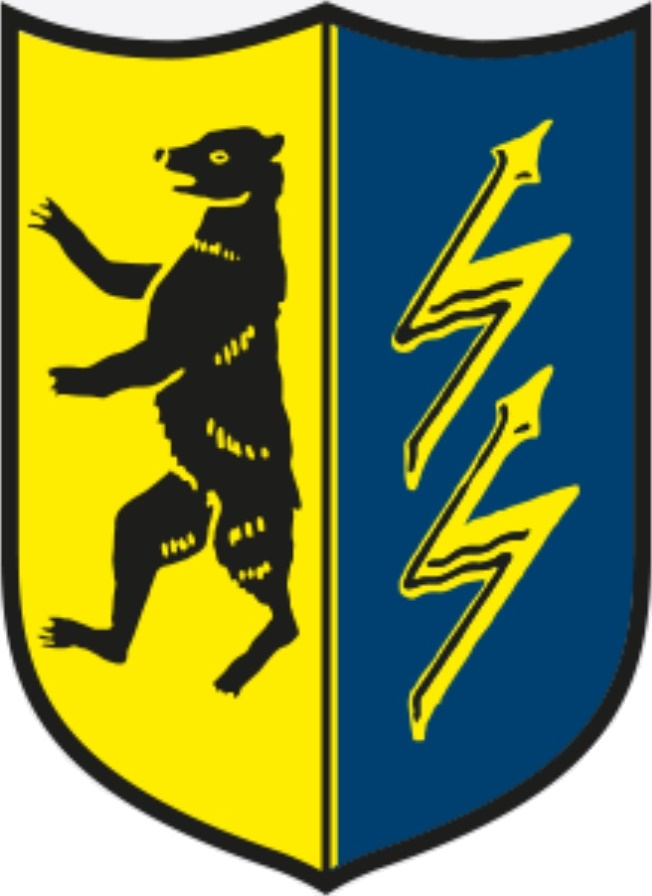
- Coat of arms

- Location within Austria
- Coordinates: 47°22′00″N 15°21′00″E
- Country: Austria
- State: Styria
- District: Bruck-Mürzzuschlag

Government
  - Mayor: Eva Schmidinger (ÖVP)

Area
  - Total: 86.07 km^{2} (33.23 sq mi)
- Elevation: 464–1,683 m (1,522–5,522 ft)

Population (2018-01-01)
  - Total: 2,356
  - Density: 27.37/km^{2} (70.90/sq mi)
- Time zone: UTC+1 (CET)
  - Summer (DST): UTC+2 (CEST)
- Postal code: 8132
- Area code: 03867
- Vehicle registration: BM
- Website: www.pernegg.at

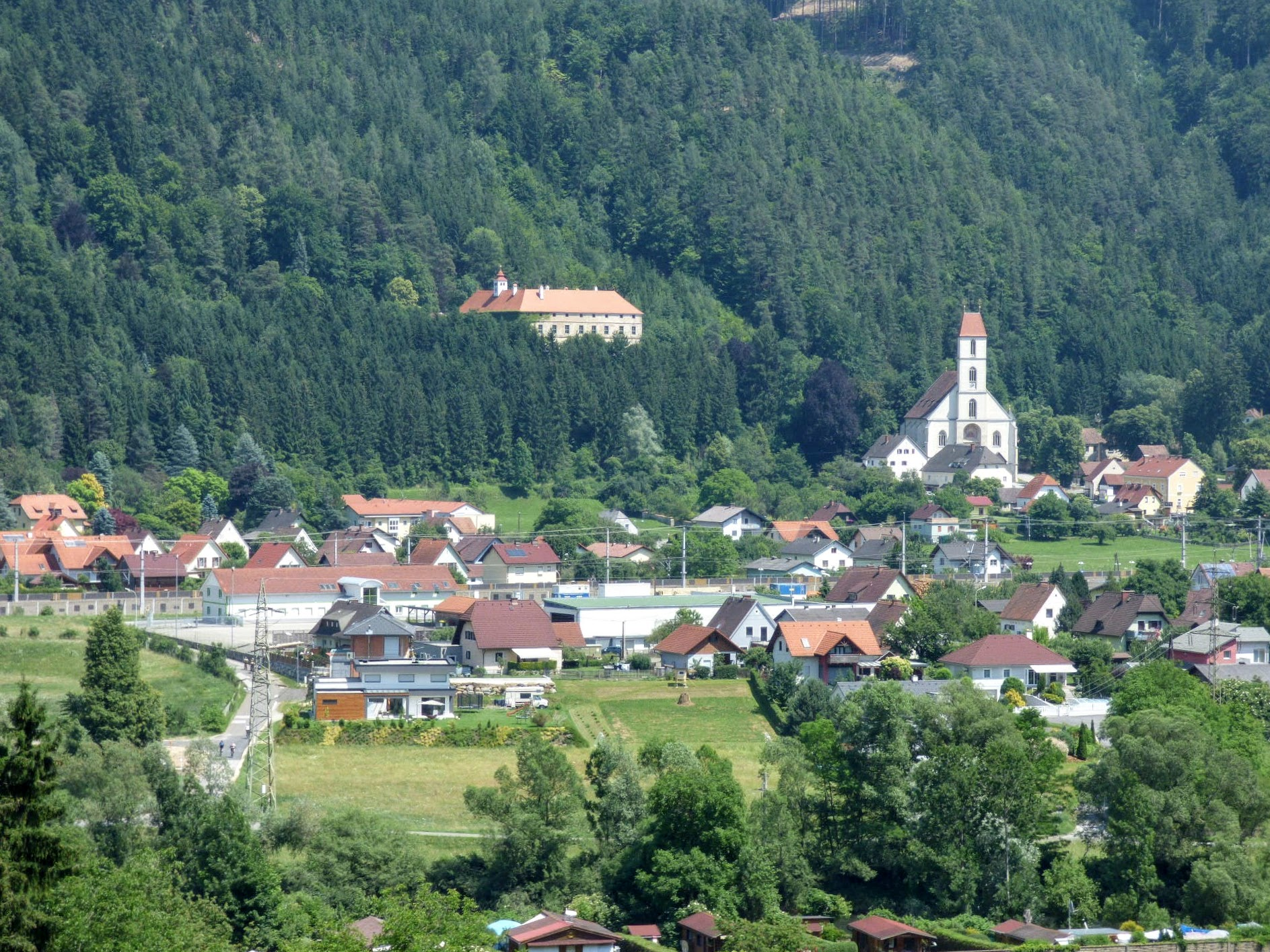
Pernegg an der Mur

Pernegg an der Mur is a municipality in the district of Bruck-Mürzzuschlag in Styria, Austria. It is home to the famous Drachenhöhle cave and Bärenschützklamm gorge.

The operatic soprano Ingrid Kaiserfeld was born in the municipality.
