= Augustin Emil Hofmann von Hofmannsthal =

Austrian businessman

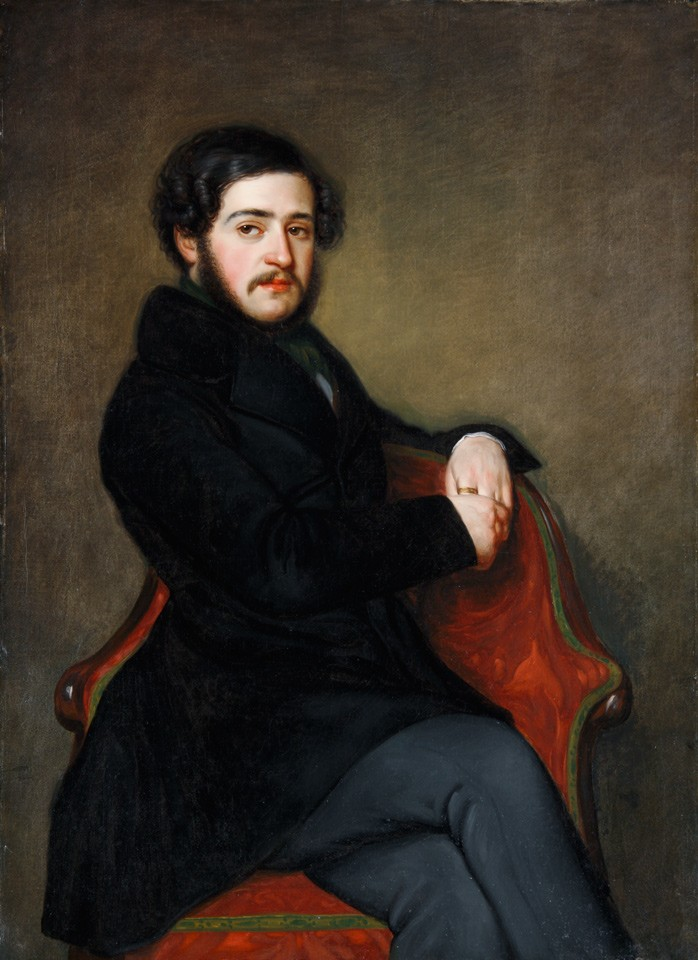
August Hofmann Edler von Hofmannsthal

Augustin Emil Hofmann von Hofmannsthal (26 January 1815 – 31 August 1881) was an Austrian industrialist.

== Early life ==
Hofmann was born in Vienna, Austria on 26 January 1815. He was a younger son of Therese (née Schefteles) von Hofmannsthal and Isaak Löw Hofmann, Edler von Hofmannsthal. Among his siblings was Elise von Hofmannsthal (whose sister-in-law, Adelheid Herz, married Carl Mayer von Rothschild).

His father was a Jewish tobacco farmer who was made a member of the hereditary nobility, as "Edler von Hofmannsthal," by the Emperor of Austria in 1835. (Note: Edler was, until 1919, the lowest rank of nobility in Austria-Hungary and Germany, just beneath a Ritter (hereditary knight), but above untitled nobles, who used only the nobiliary particle von before their surnames.)

== Career ==
He was a silk breeder, factory owner, and the head of his father's subsidiary business-house in Milan. He was a recipient of the Cross of Merit of Austria-Hungary.

== Personal life ==
He converted to Catholicism and, on 5 May 1839, married Petronilla Antonia Cäcilia (née von Rhò) Ordioni (1815–1898) in Milan. The marriage was later found to be invalid due to a legal defect when it was conducted, so they married again Vienna on 8 April 1850. (Note: As their eldest son, Hugo, was born in 1841, he was later legitimized per matrimonium subregnem. He, therefore, used the surname von Rhò from birth, but beginning in 1850, he used the surname von Hofmannsthal.) Petronilla, a daughter of Anton Maria von Rhò and widow of Pietro Ordioni (who died in 1835), was from an aristocratic Italian family. Together, they were the parents of:

- Hugo August Peter von Hofmannsthal (1841–1915), a director of the Boden-Credit-Anstalt who married Anna Maria Josefa Fohleutner, a daughter of Laurentz Fohleutner (whose family came to Vienna from the Sudetenland via Bavaria).
- Sylvius Silvio Arvinius Leo von Hofmannsthal (1852–1921), an engineer who married Emerica Albertina "Emma" Burián von Rajecz, a member of an ancient Hungarian noble family.
- Guido von Hofmannsthal (1854-1925), (Note: Beginning in 1901, he used the surname von Rhò as Guido von Rhò.) an art collector and banker with Wiener Bankverein who married Franziska "Fanny" Opatalek-Treis in Bad Ischl in 1885.

Hofmannsthal died on 31 August 1881 at Krems in Lower Austria.

=== Descendants ===
Through his son Hugo, he was a grandfather of Hugo von Hofmannsthal (1874–1929), an Austrian novelist, librettist, and dramatist, and great-grandfather of writer Raimund von Hofmannsthal (1906–1974).
