= William Hoffman =

William Hoffman may refer to:

- William Hoffman (author) (1925–2009), American novelist
- William Hoffman (painter) (1924–1995), American painter
- William Hoffman (United States Army) (1807–1884), American military officer, led the Colorado River Expedition of 1858–1859 against the Mohave
- William Hofmann (1824–1902), American Union Army officer during the American Civil War
- Sonny Hoffman (William A. Hoffman, 1853–?), baseball player
- William F. Hoffmann (scientist), physicist at the University of Arizona who was awarded the status of Fellow from the American Physical Society
- William M. Hoffman (1939–2017), American playwright
- Bill Hoffman (American football) (1902–1994), American football player
- Bill Hoffman (bowling) (born 1971), ten-pin bowler
- Bill Hoffman (baseball) (1918–2004), American baseball player
- Billy Hoffman, American country music artist
- Bill Hoffman, one of the original developers of CMake and vice president of Kitware
- Bill Hoffman, candidate in the United States House of Representatives elections in Washington, 2010
