= Philipp Hofmann (photographer) =

German photographer (born 1976)

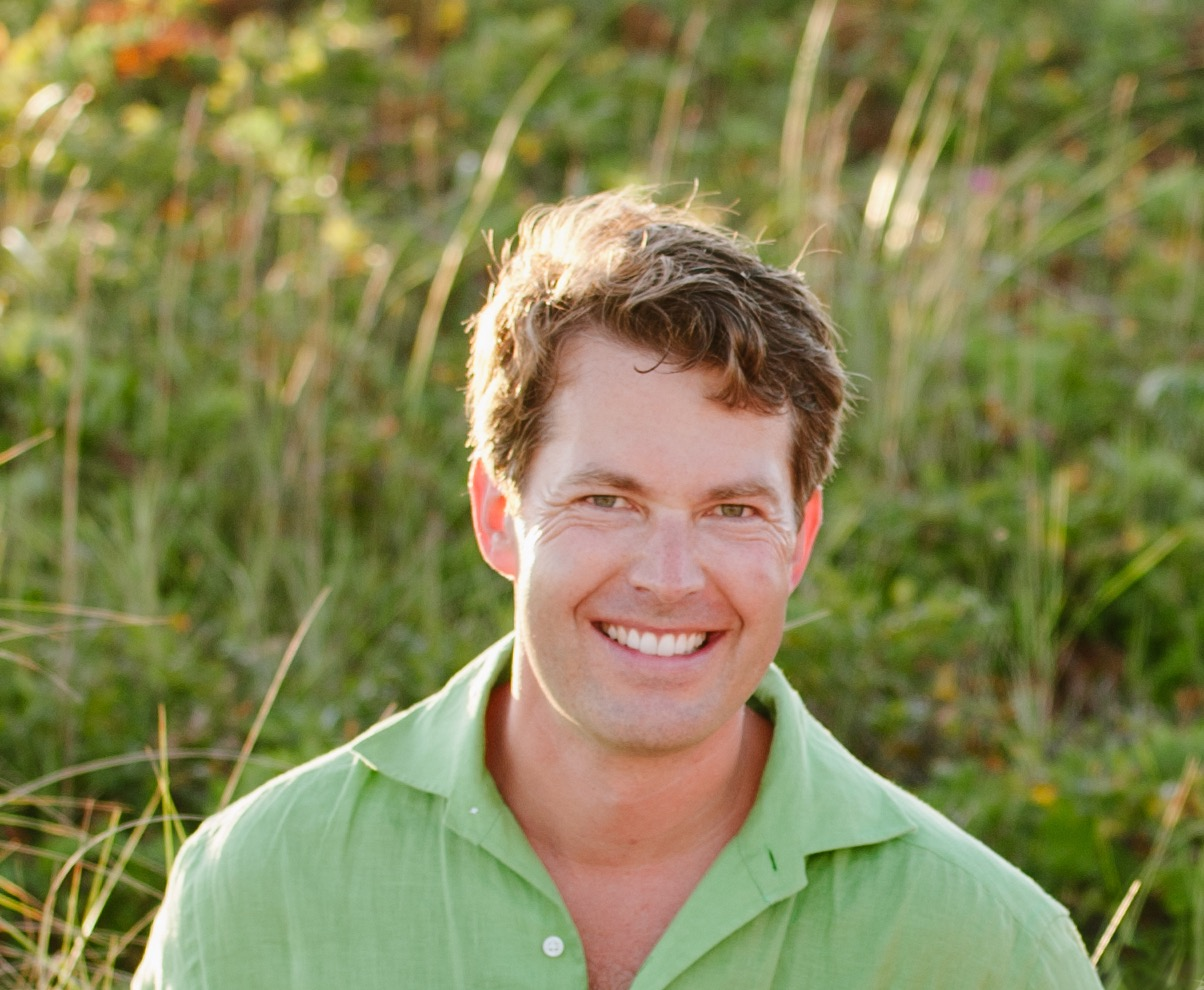
- Born: Philipp Hofmann; Munich, Germany
- Education: Technische Universität Berlin, Harvard Business School
- Occupations: Photographer, Digitaloil Artist
- Notable credit(s): The record price for a Philipp Hofmann photograph is the “Felix on a Sunday”, which was sold for $15,000 at Art Miami 2012 by De Buck Gallery
- Website: http://www.philipphofmann.com

Philipp Hofmann is a German photographer. He has shot his pictures internationally and has been shown at many famous art fairs such as Art Miami as well as private exhibitions such as the Durst Organization in New York.

== Early life and education ==
Hofmann is from Munich, Germany. He is an alumnus of the Technische Universität Berlin and Harvard Business School, Cambridge.

== Books ==
Hofmann's first monograph, Digitaloil Edition One, was published in 2010. Famous collectors of Hofmann's work include politicians and business magnates. Hofmann has subsequently released another book entitled Digitaloil Edition Two – Bon Voyage in 2015 which was published by Galerie Barbara von Stechow, Frankfurt in celebration of his solo show “Bon Voyage”.

== Notable exhibitions and art shows ==
Hofmann has been associated with some well-known galleries around the world, including Galerie Barbara von Stechow Frankfurt; DeBuck Gallery New York/ Antwerp/ St.Paul de Vence; Galerie von Braunbehrens Stuttgart; Hamburg Kennedy Photographs New York who showcase his work at exhibitions and art fairs worldwide.

== Bibliography ==
- Digitaloil Edition One, 2010 ISBN 978-3-00-032376-8
- Digitaloil Edition Two, 2015 ISBN 978-3-00-049784-1
