= Elaine Hoffman Watts =

American klezmer drummer

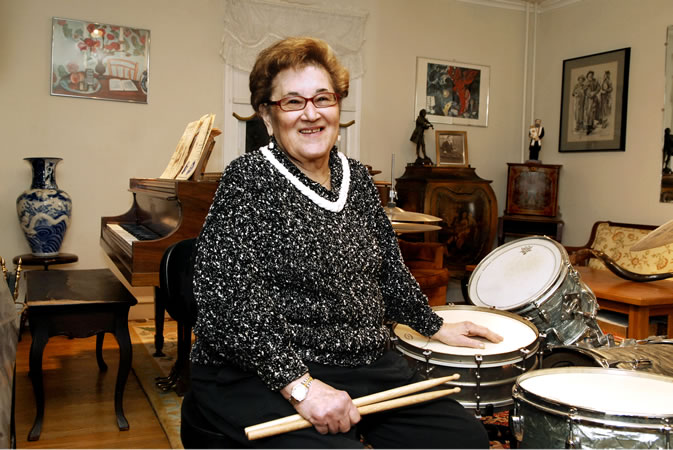
- Watts in 2007

Background information
- Birth name: Elaine Hoffman
- Born: May 25, 1932
- Died: September 25, 2017 (aged 85)
- Genres: Klezmer
- Occupation(s): Musician, educator
- Instrument(s): Drums, percussion

Elaine Hoffman Watts (May 25, 1932 – September 25, 2017) was a klezmer drummer from Philadelphia, Pennsylvania, United States.

== Biography ==
Watts came from a line of klezmer musicians from what is now Ukraine and was the daughter of Jacob Hoffman, a klezmer xylophone player and bandleader from the 1920s who also played with the Philadelphia Orchestra and Ballets Russes Orchestra. Her daughter Susan Watts is a klezmer trumpet player and an important figure in the klezmer revival. She was raised in Southwest Philadelphia and learned how to play the drums in the basement of her house. Her father would put sticks in her hands and tell her to play while he played xylophone, and she didn't have formal music lessons until she was 12 years old.

In 1954, Elaine Hoffman Watts was the first woman percussionist to be accepted and graduate from the Curtis Institute of Music in Philadelphia. After graduation she was hired as a timpanist in the New Orleans Symphony, and over the years played in other orchestras and jazz groups, including sitting in for Duke Ellington and Count Basie.

Beginning in 1998, she was a percussion teacher at KlezKamp, and she taught percussion in the Philadelphia area beginning in the mid-1960s. She was awarded a Pew Fellowship in the Arts in 2000 and was a recipient of a 2007 National Heritage Fellowship awarded by the National Endowment for the Arts, which is the United States' highest honor in the folk and traditional arts.
