= Jacob Hoffman (rabbi) =

Rabbi Jacob Hoffman

Chief Rabbi of Radauti
- In office 1912–1923

Rabbi of the Jewish community in Frankfurt am Main
- In office 1923–1937

Rabbi of Congregation Ohab Zedek, Manhattan
- In office 1938–1956
- Title: Chief Rabbi

Personal life
- Born: 1881 Pápa, Hungary
- Died: 1956 (aged 74–75)
- Education: University of Vienna
- Occupation: Rabbi, Talmudic scholar

Religious life
- Religion: Judaism
- Denomination: Orthodox Judaism

Jacob Hoffman (Hebrew: יעקב הופמן) (1881-1956) was a rabbi born in Pápa, Hungary.
