= Richard Hoffman =

Richard Hof(f)man(n) may refer to:

- Richard Hoffman (composer) (1831–1909), English-born American pianist and composer
- Richard Hofmann (composer) (1844–1918), German composer and pedagogue who worked in Leipzig
- Richard H. Hoffmann (1887–1967), American psychiatrist
- Richard W. Hoffman (1893–1975), U.S. Representative from Illinois
- Richard Hofmann (1906–1983), German footballer
- Richard Hoffmann (composer) (1925–2021), Austrian-born American composer
- Richard L. Hoffman (1927–2012), American zoologist, specializing in millipedes
- Rick Hoffman (born 1970), American actor
- Richárd Hoffmann (born 1978), Hungarian footballer
