= Hofmans =

Hofmans is a Dutch-language surname and a variant of Hofman. It may refer to:

- David Hofmans (born 1943), American horse-trainer
- Greet Hofmans (1894–1968), Dutch faith-healer
- Gunther Hofmans (born 1967), Belgian footballer
