= Steve Hoffman =

Steve or Steven Hoffman may refer to:

- Steve Hoffman (American football) (born 1958), American football player and coach
- Steve Hoffman (audio engineer) (born 1951), audio and mastering engineer
- Steve Hoffman (rugby union), South African international rugby union player
- Steven Hoffman (Australian footballer) (born 1951), former Australian rules footballer
- Steven Hoffman (South African soccer) (born 1994), South African football goalkeeper

== See also ==
- Steve Hoffmann (born 1955), American physician
- Steve Huffman (born 1983/84), CEO of Reddit
