= Philip T. Hoffman =

Economic historian

- Awards: Guggenheim Fellowship (2001); Cliometric Society Fellow (2013); Fellow, Economic History Association (2019); Gyorgy Ranki Prize (1997, 2001, 2021)

Academic background
- Education: Harvard University (BA); University of California, Berkeley (MA); Yale University (PhD)

Academic work
- Discipline: Economic history
- Sub-discipline: Early modern France, financial history, military history
- Institutions: California Institute of Technology
- Notable works: Why Did Europe Conquer the World? (2015); Growth in a Traditional Society (1996); Dark Matter Credit (2019)
- Website: hoffman.caltech.edu

Philip T. Hoffman is an American economic historian who is the Rea A. and Lela G. Axline Professor of Business Economics and History, emeritus, at the California Institute of Technology. His work combines economic theory with historical evidence to explain long-run economic growth, the development of financial and political institutions, and the rise of the West, most prominently in Why Did Europe Conquer the World? (2015) and in three books on French credit markets written with Gilles Postel-Vinay and Jean-Laurent Rosenthal. He served as president of the Economic History Association in 2013–2014 and of the Social Science History Association in 2019–2020, and edited The Journal of Economic History from 2006 to 2010.

== Education ==
Hoffman received a B.A. with honors in mathematics from Harvard University in 1969 and an M.A. in mathematics from the University of California, Berkeley, in 1971. He then turned from mathematics to history, earning an M.Phil. in 1976 and a Ph.D. in history in 1979 from Yale University, with dissertation research at the Université de Lyon II in France in 1976–77. His dissertation received Yale's John Addison Porter Prize in 1980. After joining the Caltech faculty he completed additional graduate work in economics there from 1980 to 1982.

== Career ==
Hoffman spent his teaching career at the California Institute of Technology. Appointed lecturer in history in 1980, he became assistant professor in 1982, associate professor of history and social science in 1984, and professor in 1995. He held the Richard and Barbara Rosenberg chair in History and Social Science from 2003 to 2008 and the Rea A. and Lela G. Axline chair in Business Economics and History from 2008 to 2023, when he became professor emeritus. He also served as Caltech's Executive Officer for the Humanities from 1995 to 2000.

Hoffman edited The Journal of Economic History from 2006 to 2010. He was president of the Economic History Association in 2013–2014 and president of the Social Science History Association in 2019–2020. In 2013, he became a Fellow of the Cliometric Society, (Note: The Cliometric Society is an academic organization devoted to the use of economic theory and statistical techniques to study economic history.) a fellowship that honors economic historians. In 2019 Hoffman became a fellow of the Economic History Association, whose Society of Distinguished Fellows was created that year with an inaugural class made up of the association's living former presidents.

Hoffman has held visiting appointments at the École des hautes études en sciences sociales (2011), the Paris School of Economics (2011, 2014), and the Hong Kong University of Science and Technology (2013), and was a member of the board of directors of the National Bureau of Economic Research from 2018 to 2021.

== Research and writings ==
Hoffman's first book, Church and Community in the Diocese of Lyon, 1500–1789 (Yale University Press, 1984), began as his dissertation on the social history of the Counter-Reformation around Lyon. It won the American Catholic Historical Association's John Gilmary Shea Prize in 1984.

His second book, Growth in a Traditional Society: The French Countryside, 1450–1815 (Princeton University Press, 1996), argued against the standard view that French agriculture stagnated for the three and a half centuries before the Revolution, held back by inefficient small farms and villages hostile to innovation. From data on prices, wages, and rents, some of it taken from leases on farms owned by the Cathedral of Notre Dame in Paris, Hoffman calculated total factor productivity for about twenty communities. The Paris Basin, he found, saw sustained productivity growth from the sixteenth century to the late eighteenth, at rates comparable to England's, while other regions stagnated; he put the difference down to recurrent war and taxation rather than peasant conservatism. Jonathan Liebowitz, reviewing the book for H-France, praised its "meticulous and imaginative research" and called it "a truly interdisciplinary book." In 1997 the book won the Economic History Association's Gyorgy Ranki Prize and the Social Science History Association's Allan Sharlin Prize; an article from the same research, "Land Rents and Agricultural Productivity: The Paris Basin, 1450–1789," had already won the Economic History Association's Arthur H. Cole Prize in 1992.

With Gilles Postel-Vinay and Jean-Laurent Rosenthal, Hoffman wrote three books on the history of credit in France. The first, Priceless Markets: The Political Economy of Credit in Paris, 1660–1870 (University of Chicago Press, 2000), won the Ranki Prize in 2001. Surviving Large Losses: Financial Crises, the Middle Class, and the Development of Capital Markets (Belknap Press of Harvard University Press, 2007) argued that financial crises drive institutional change, and that what reform follows a crisis depends on the middle class, financial intermediaries, and government. The economist Howard Bodenhorn called this "an original and provocative hypothesis" but found the book's account of how financial institutions emerge incomplete. The third book, Dark Matter Credit: The Development of Peer-to-Peer Lending and Banking in France (Princeton University Press, 2019), drew on records of some 250,000 loans to reconstruct the lending that French notaries arranged before and alongside banks, debt the authors put at 16 percent of GDP in 1740 and, at its peak in 1840, 27 percent. The historian Francesca Trivellato called the book "superb," writing that it joins "the economist's thirst for systematic data with the historian's desire to tap a wide variety of quantitative and qualitative sources." Dark Matter Credit shared the Ranki Prize in 2021.

In Why Did Europe Conquer the World? (Princeton University Press, 2015), Hoffman asked how Europeans came to control 84 percent of the globe by 1914. The usual explanations, disease, geography, and industrialization, fall short, he argued; the difference lay in the pressures that drove European rulers to wage and pay for war. Taxes went overwhelmingly to the military, small rival states learned quickly from one another about gunpowder weapons, and private entrepreneurs were free to mount armed expeditions of their own. None of these conditions held, in his account, under a durable hegemonic empire like China's. The economic historian Jari Eloranta found the book "impressive and persuasive" and predicted it would become "a classic of economic history, which should be required reading by scholars everywhere," though he thought it gave short shrift to war finance and to the part natural resources such as coal played in industrialization. It has been translated into Spanish, Korean, Chinese, German, and Turkish.

His book, Why Europe? The Great Divergence and the West's Rise to Global Predominance was published by Cambridge University Press in 2026.

== Awards and honors ==
- 1984 – John Gilmary Shea Prize, American Catholic Historical Association, for Church and Community in the Diocese of Lyon, 1500–1789
- 1987 – Graves Award for Achievement in the Humanities
- 1992 – Arthur H. Cole Prize, Economic History Association, for "Land Rents and Agricultural Productivity: The Paris Basin, 1450–1789"
- 1992 – Nancy Lyman Roelker Prize, Sixteenth Century Studies Conference, for the same article
- 1997 – Gyorgy Ranki Prize, Economic History Association, for Growth in a Traditional Society
- 1997 – Allan Sharlin Prize, Social Science History Association, for Growth in a Traditional Society
- 2001 – Gyorgy Ranki Prize, Economic History Association, for Priceless Markets
- 2001 – Guggenheim Fellowship, in economic history
- 2013 – Cliometric Society Fellow
- 2019 – Fellow, Economic History Association
- 2021 – Gyorgy Ranki Prize, Economic History Association, for Dark Matter Credit

== Selected works ==
=== Books ===
- Church and Community in the Diocese of Lyon, 1500–1789. New Haven: Yale University Press, 1984.
- Growth in a Traditional Society: The French Countryside, 1450–1815. Princeton: Princeton University Press, 1996.
- with Gilles Postel-Vinay and Jean-Laurent Rosenthal. Priceless Markets: The Political Economy of Credit in Paris, 1660–1870. Chicago: University of Chicago Press, 2000.
- with Gilles Postel-Vinay and Jean-Laurent Rosenthal. Surviving Large Losses: Financial Crises, the Middle Class, and the Development of Capital Markets. Cambridge, MA: Belknap Press of Harvard University Press, 2007.
- Why Did Europe Conquer the World? Princeton: Princeton University Press, 2015.
- with Gilles Postel-Vinay and Jean-Laurent Rosenthal. Dark Matter Credit: The Development of Peer-to-Peer Lending and Banking in France. Princeton: Princeton University Press, 2019.
- ed., with Kathryn Norberg. Fiscal Crises, Liberty, and Representative Government, 1450–1789. Stanford: Stanford University Press, 1994.
- ed., with Stanley Engerman, Jean-Laurent Rosenthal, and Kenneth Sokoloff. Finance, Intermediaries, and Economic Development. Cambridge: Cambridge University Press, 2003.

=== Articles ===
- Hoffman, Philip T. "The economic theory of sharecropping in early modern France." The Journal of Economic History 44, no. 2 (1984): 309-319.
- Hoffman, Philip T. "Taxes and agrarian life in early modern France: land sales, 1550–1730." The Journal of Economic History 46, no. 1 (1986): 37-55.
- Hoffman, Philip T. "Institutions and agriculture in old regime France." Politics & Society 16, no. 2-3 (1988): 241-264.
- Hoffman, Philip T. "Land rents and agricultural productivity: the Paris basin, 1450–1789." The Journal of Economic History 51, no. 4 (1991): 771-805.
- Hoffman, P.T., Postel-Vinay, G. and Rosenthal, J.L., 1992. Private credit markets in Paris, 1690–1840. The journal of economic history, 52(2), pp. 293–306.
- Hoffman, Philip T., Gilles Postel-Vinay, and Jean-Laurent Rosenthal. "Redistribution and long-term private debt in Paris, 1660–1726." The Journal of Economic History 55, no. 2 (1995): 256-284.
- Hoffman, Philip T., Gilles Postel-Vinay, and Jean-Laurent Rosenthal. "What do notaries do? Overcoming asymmetric information in financial markets: The case of Paris, 1751." Journal of Institutional and Theoretical Economics (JITE)/Zeitschrift für die gesamte Staatswissenschaft (1998): 499-530.
- Hoffman, Philip T., Gilles Postel-Vinay, and Jean-Laurent Rosenthal. "Information and economic history: How the credit market in old regime Paris forces us to rethink the transition to capitalism." The American Historical Review 104, no. 1 (1999): 69-94.
- Hoffman, Philip T., David S. Jacks, Patricia A. Levin, and Peter H. Lindert. "Real inequality in Europe since 1500." The Journal of Economic History 62, no. 2 (2002): 322-355.
- Hoffman, P.T., 2011. Prices, the military revolution, and Western Europe's comparative advantage in violence. The Economic History Review, 64, pp. 39–59.
- Hoffman, Philip T. "Why was it Europeans who conquered the world?." The Journal of Economic History 72, no. 3 (2012): 601-633.
- Hoffman, Philip T., Gilles Postel-Vinay, and Jean-Laurent Rosenthal. "Entry, information, and financial development: A century of competition between French banks and notaries." Explorations in Economic History 55 (2015): 39-57.
- Hoffman, Philip T. "What do states do? Politics and economic history." The Journal of Economic History 75, no. 2 (2015): 303-332.
