= Nanna Hoffman =

Swedish entrepreneur (1843–1920)

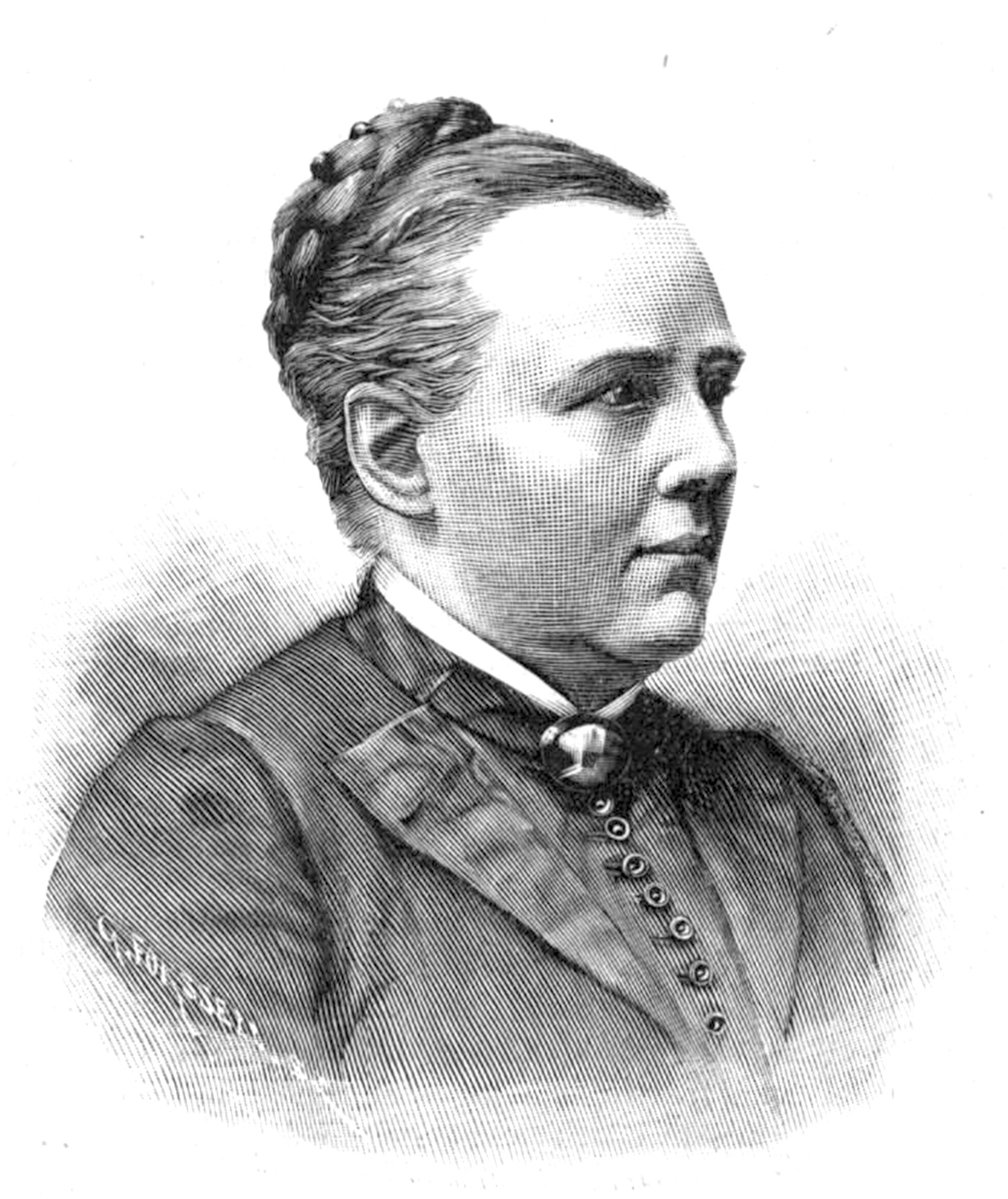
- Nanna Hoffman, Idun 1893, no. 23
- Born: 23 May 1843; Södertälje, Sweden
- Died: 21 June 1920 (aged 77); Stockholm, Sweden
- Occupations: Entrepreneur and piano manufacturer
- Spouse: August Hoffmann

Nanna Hoffman (23 May 1843 – 21 June 1920) was a Swedish entrepreneur and piano manufacturer.

== Biography ==
Nanna Oscara Maria Nicolina Westin was born in Södertälje, Sweden. She was the daughter of landowner Carl Oscar Westin (d. 1850), who owned the Hjortsberga estate, and Thora Johanna Arvidsson. Her father died bankrupt, and both she and her mother made a living as governesses until their marriages. In 1864 she married August Hoffmann, owner of a piano factory.

She became the owner and managing director of August Hoffmanns pianofabrik ('August Hoffman Piano Factory') in Stockholm after the death of her husband in 1884. Her time as director was a period of great success for the company. When her husband died, the company suffered a loss because until then it had been producing square pianos, which in the 1870s were outcompeted by a new model of piano; the pianino, a small upright piano. On his deathbed, August Hoffman advised Nanna to give up factory production and sell other pianos instead. From 1889, however, she managed to reorganize production and adapt it to the new model of piano through a partnership with the American piano manufacturer William Steinway. She was his agent in Sweden, and in 1889 she persuaded him to allow her to replicate his instruments for the production of Hoffman pianos in Sweden, with the help of his branch in Hamburg. She then made several study trips to update her piano manufacturing techniques.

In 1893, she herself stated that she had achieved a high profit and a high quality of her goods that year, and that this had raised the standard of the piano industry throughout Sweden, which had been very low and close to extinction. She also cites the increased duty on foreign musical instruments as a reason.

She was interviewed in the magazine Idun in 1893, during which she described her difficulties taking over the company:

"How I worked to learn the profession, which was now to become mine, and how many times I prayed to God that I should succeed! And when my workers, my capable, skillful workers now and then complained about my pickiness, I only replied: "Just thank God that I am thorough, because the existence of both me and you depends on it!" I also had a great help in the fact that I was musical, and was able to understand for myself if an instrument was good or not."

She was given a Royal warrant of appointment in 1912 as the first of her trade in Sweden, stating herself that she had been a purveyor to the royal court of Sweden informally since 1892. She was given the Illis quorum for her contribution to Swedish industry.

Hoffman died 21 June 1920 in Stockholm.
