= Isaak Löw Hofmann, Edler von Hofmannsthal =

Austrian merchant

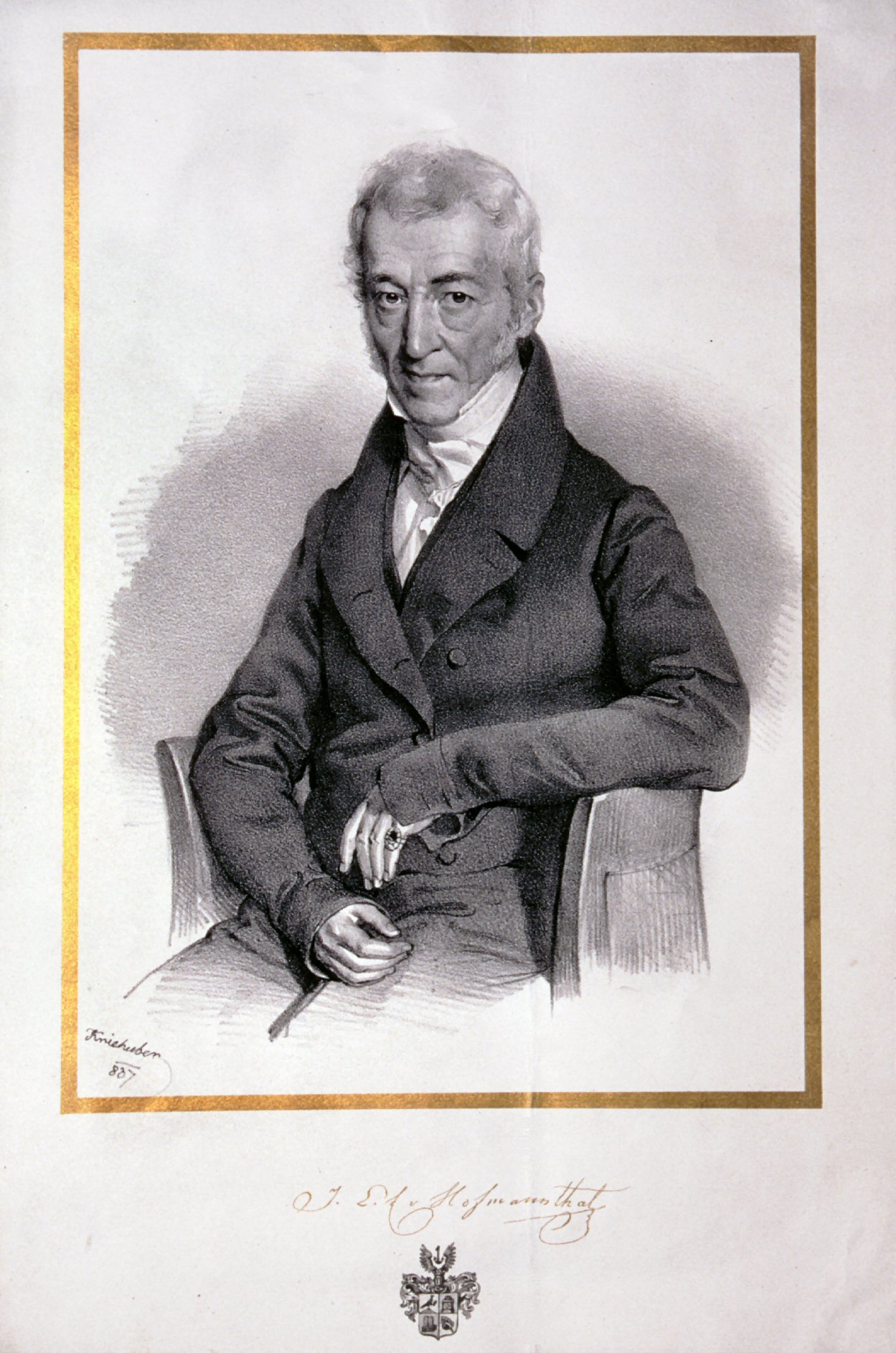
Isaak Löw Hofmann von Hofmannsthal, 1837

Isaak Löw Hofmann, Edler von Hofmannsthal (10 June 1759 – 12 December 1849) was an Austrian merchant.

== Early life ==
Hofmann was born on 10 June 1759 in Prostiboř, Bohemia (today the Czech Republic).

During the famine in Ansbach in the middle of the 18th century, Hofmann's parents had emigrated from Pretzendorf (now Himmelkron), near Bayreuth, to Bohemia, where they lived in very poor circumstances. His early training he received at home, and from his thirteenth year he studied at Prague as a "bachur" (Talmudic scholar) under Rabbi Abraham Plohn.

== Career ==
After completing his studies he entered as teacher the house of Joel Baruch, a tobacco farmer for the Austrian government. Besides giving instruction to the children, Hofmann took charge of the books of his employer. When in 1788 Baruch moved to Vienna and opened a wholesale house there, Hofmann was appointed manager of the entire business. Having received the same year a permit from the Austrian government to do business in Vienna, he chose the name "Isaak Löw Hofmann". On the death of Baruch he was made a partner and, in 1794, became sole member of the firm which bore the name "Hofmann und Löwinger". Becoming interested in 1796 in the manufacture of silk, he was one of the first to farm the silk monopoly from the Hungarian government (1802), a privilege which his house retained for nearly half a century. At his instigation, his son Emanuel wrote a pamphlet, "Einleitung zur Seidenzucht", of which more than 16,000 copies were distributed. Hofmann was very active in business, and succeeded in making his firm one of the leading houses of Austria-Hungary.

Hofmann took great interest in the Jewish community of Vienna, being president in 1806 and representative in 1812, which latter office he held until his death. In 1822 he founded the institution for the poor ("Armenanstalt"), which is still flourishing. He received many honours, and was made, in 1835, a member of the hereditary nobility by the Ferdinand I, Emperor of Austria as Edler von Hofmannsthal.

== Personal life ==
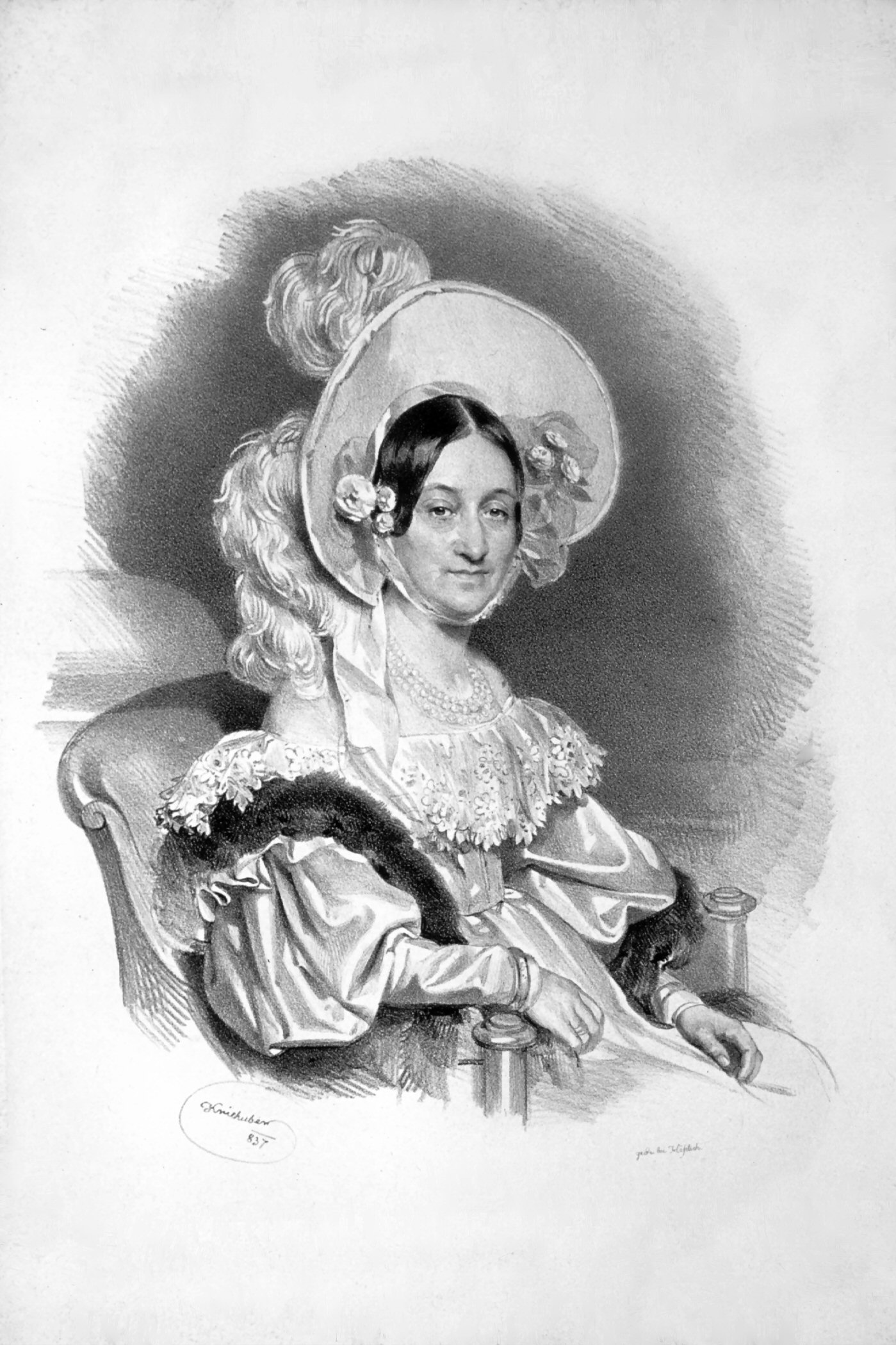
Lithograph of Therese von Hofmannsthal (née Schefteles) by Josef Kriehuber, 1837

Hofmann was married to Therese Schefteles (1773–1850), a daughter of Wolf Beer Schefteles. Together, they were the parents of:

- Henriette Hofmann (1791–1830)
- Regine Babette Hofmann (1792–1812)
- Josephine Pepi Hofmann (1795–1819)
- Emanuel Hofmann von Hofmannsthal (1800–1883)
- Josef Edler von Hofmannsthal (1802–1872)
- Sigmund Edler von Hofmannsthal (1805–1883)
- Ignaz Hofmann von Hofmannsthal (1807–1876)
- Elise von Hofmannsthal (1807–1876)
- Augustin Emil Hofmann von Hofmannsthal (1815–1881)
- Ernestine von Hofmannsthal (died 1870)
- Bernhard von Hofmannsthal, a banker

Hofmann von Hofmannsthal died on 12 December 1849 in Vienna.

=== Descendants ===
He was the great-grandfather of the Austrian novelist, librettist, and dramatist Hugo von Hofmannsthal (1874–1929).
