= Camille Hoffman =

American painter and installation artist

Camille Hoffman is a painter and mixed-media installation artist, living and working in New York, NY. Hoffman's practice re-threads misplaced histories, materials, and ancestral geographies, including those of the Philippines and the Americas, by resculpting artificial, mass-produced vinyl landscapes through handwork — collage, sewing, and painterly gesture. Through this tactile transformation, she builds sacred in-between spaces that evoke the sensory experience of moving between multiple places and identities at once. Informed by historical research, community-oriented conversations, and dreams, these spaces intend to be activated by the land they live on, the architecture that houses them, and the people who visit.

== Early life and education ==
Camille Hoffman was born in Chicago, IL in 1987. She earned her BFA in Community Arts and Painting from the California College of the Arts in 2009. She received her MFA in Painting and Printmaking from the Yale School of Art in 2015, during which she received the Carol Schlosberg Memorial Prize for excellence in painting and a Benjamin A. Gilman International Scholarship for research in Spain.

== Art ==
Camille Hoffman's work examines colonial histories, consumerism, and play. Her paintings and installations layer traditional art materials with textures and objects from the everyday.

Hoffman's landscape works are a mixed-media meditation on Manifest Destiny and its representation in the romantic American landscape. She reflects on the enclosed meanings found in light, nature, the frontier, borders, race, gender and power in the 19th century American landscape paintings. Taking inspiration from her ancestors' Philippine weaving techniques and Jewish folk traditions, with the addition of traditional landscape painting techniques from her academic training, Hoffman integrates refuse into the image, to reveal trans-cultural contradictions. These works incorporate holiday-themed tablecloths, discarded medical records, nature calendars, plastic bags, paint, and other materials to make imaginary landscapes grounded in accumulation, personal narrative and history.

Hoffman has been the recipient of numerous honors, including a National Endowment for the Arts Award and the Van Lier Fellowship from the Museum of Arts and Design.

== Exhibits ==
Hoffman has exhibited her work throughout the United States and in Europe.

=== Solo exhibitions ===
2005. Subway, Art One Gallery, Scottsdale, AZ

2009. Summer Spectacular, Art One Gallery, Scottsdale, AZ

2009. About Face: Deconstructing Diversity in the Institution, Center Gallery, Oakland, CA

2014. Music & Conversation, Indo-Pacific Gallery, Yale University Art Gallery, New Haven, CT

2015. Service, Marquand Chapel, Yale Divinity School, New Haven, CT

2015. 2,015 But Who's Counting: Yale MFA Thesis Exhibition, Yale School of Art, New Haven, CT

2018. Excelsior: Ever Upward, Ever Afloat, Queens Museum, Queens, NY (through August 26, 2019)

2018. Rockabye My Bedrock Bones, False Flag Projects, Long Island City, NY

2018. Pieceable Kingdom, Fellow Focus, Museum of Arts and Design, New York, NY

2021. Camille Hoffman at NADA House 2021, False Flag

2022. Motherlands, Zane Bennett Contemporary Art

=== Group exhibitions ===
2007. A Class Act, Joyce Gordon Gallery, Oakland, CA

2007. Rest in Peace, Rise in Peace, South Gallery, Oakland, CA

2007. Dialects of the Heart, Corazon Del Pueblo Gallery, Oakland, CA

2008. MASIVAMENTE, Espai Cultural Biblioteca Azorín, Valencia, Spain

2008. The Future of Culture, North/South Gallery, Oakland, CA

2011. Road to the Hidden Green Village, 3rdeye(sol)ation Gallery, Brooklyn, NY

2012. Intensive Exhibition, LeRoy Neiman Gallery, Columbia University, New York, NY

2013. Splendor in the Grass, Green Hall Gallery, Yale School of Art, New Haven, CT

2015. Jew as the Other, Abrazo Interno Gallery Clemente Center, New York, NY

2015. Arresting Patterns, Artspace, New Haven, CT

2015. Yale Painting and Printmaking Graduates 2015, Garis & Hahn Gallery, New York, NY

2015. SEEN, Yale institute of Sacred Music, New Haven, CT

2016. New Genealogies, Yale School of Art, New Haven, CT

2017. LifeWtr Open Gallery, Lincoln Center Plaza, New York, NY

2017. Art By a Woman, LifeWtr digital exhibition, Times Square and Oculus at World Trade Center, New York, NY

2018. Volumes: Queens International 2018, Queens Museum, Queens, NY

2018. Art, Artists & You, Children's Museum of Manhattan, New York, NY

2018. Home: Making Space for Radical Love and Struggle, Tecoah Bruce Gallery, California College of the Arts, Oakland, CA

2018. People I Love Who Are Far Away, E.TAY Gallery, New York, NY

2019. Ineffable Manifestations, Yale Institute of Sacred Music

2019. Here We Land, Wave Hill Public Garden and Cultural Center, Bronx, NY (forthcoming)

2019. But My Heart Was Awake, GOLESTANI

2022. Tempus Fugit, LatchKey Gallery

== Awards ==
- 2007 Benjamin A. Gilman International Scholarship, Study in Valencia, Spain
- 2008 Community Student Fellow, California College of the Arts
- 2009 National Endowment for the Arts Scholarship
- 2014 Schickle-Collingwood Prize, Yale University School of Art
- 2015 Carol Schlosberg Memorial Prize for Excellence in Painting
- 2015 Yale University John A. Carrafiell Scholarship
- 2015 Yale University School of Art Editor's Choice
- 2015 New American Paintings, No. 116, Northeast Issue
- 2016 Nomination for Joan Mitchell Emerging Artist Grant
- 2017 Van Lier Fellowship, Museum of Arts and Design, New York, NY
