= Philip Hoffmann (alpine skier) =

Austria olympic alpine skier (born 2002)

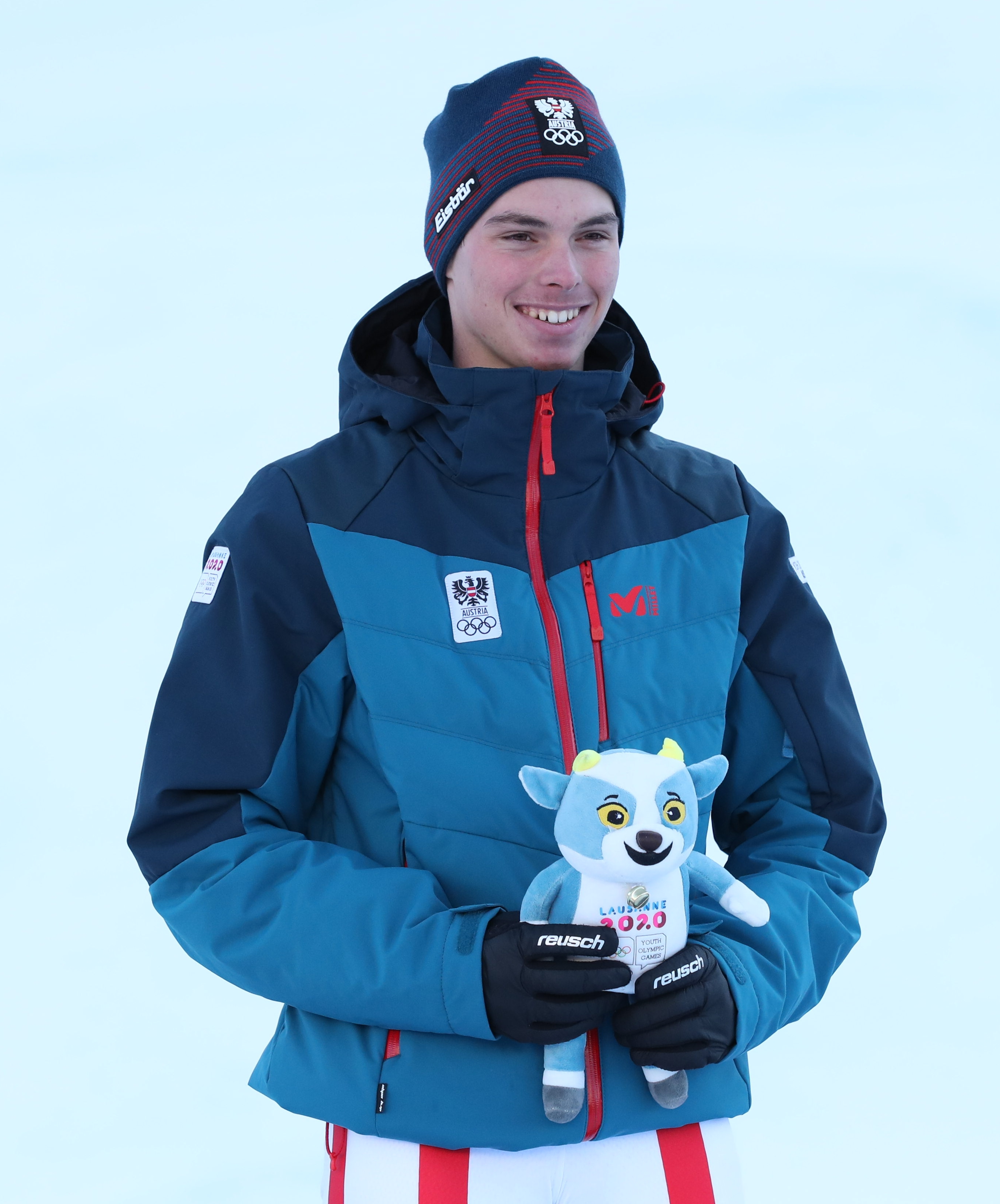
- Hoffmann in 2020

Personal information
- Born: 2002 (age 23–24)

Sport
- Country: Austria
- Sport: Alpine skiing
Medal record
Representing Austria
Youth Olympic Games
Alpine skiing
Gold medal – first place	2020 Lausanne	Boys' giant slalom
Bronze medal – third place	2020 Lausanne	Parallel mixed team

Philip Hoffman (born 2002) is an Austrian Olympic alpine skier. He participated at the 2020 Winter Youth Olympics in the alpine skiing competition, being awarded the gold medal in the boys' giant slalom event. Hoffman also participated in the parallel mixed team event, being awarded the bronze medal with his teammate, Amanda Salzgeber.
