= Robert Hoffman =

Robert or Bob Hoffman may refer to:

- Robert Hoffman (actor) (born 1980), American actor
- Bob Hoffman (basketball) (born 1957), American basketball coach
- Robert Hoffman (businessman) (1947–2006), American businessman
- Robert R. Hoffman (born 1950), American cognitive psychologist,
- Bob Hoffman (American football) (1917–2005), American football player
- Bob Hoffman (sports promoter) (1898–1985), American promoter and entrepreneur of physical culture
- Bobby Hoffman (born 1966), martial arts fighter
- Robert Hoffman (Jericho)
- Robert Hoffmann (1939–2022), Austrian actor and model
- Robert A. Hoffmann, United States Air Force general
- Robert S. Hoffmann (1929–2010), American mammalogist
- Bobby Hofman (1925–1994), American baseball player and coach
