= Edward George Hoffman =

American politician (1877–1931)

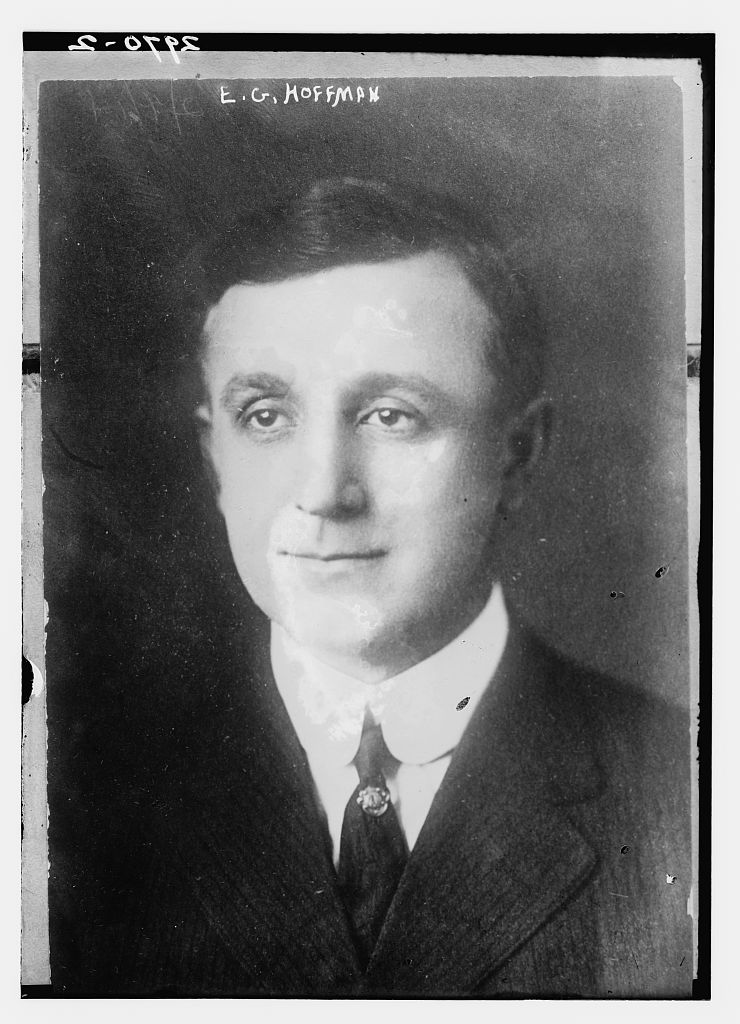

Edward George Hoffman (October 1, 1877 – February 11, 1931) was a Democratic National Committee member from Indiana from 1916 to 1920.

== Biography ==
He died on February 11, 1931, when he fell from his horse.
