= Drachenhöhle =

Cave and archaeological site in Austria

- Mixnitzer Kogellucken
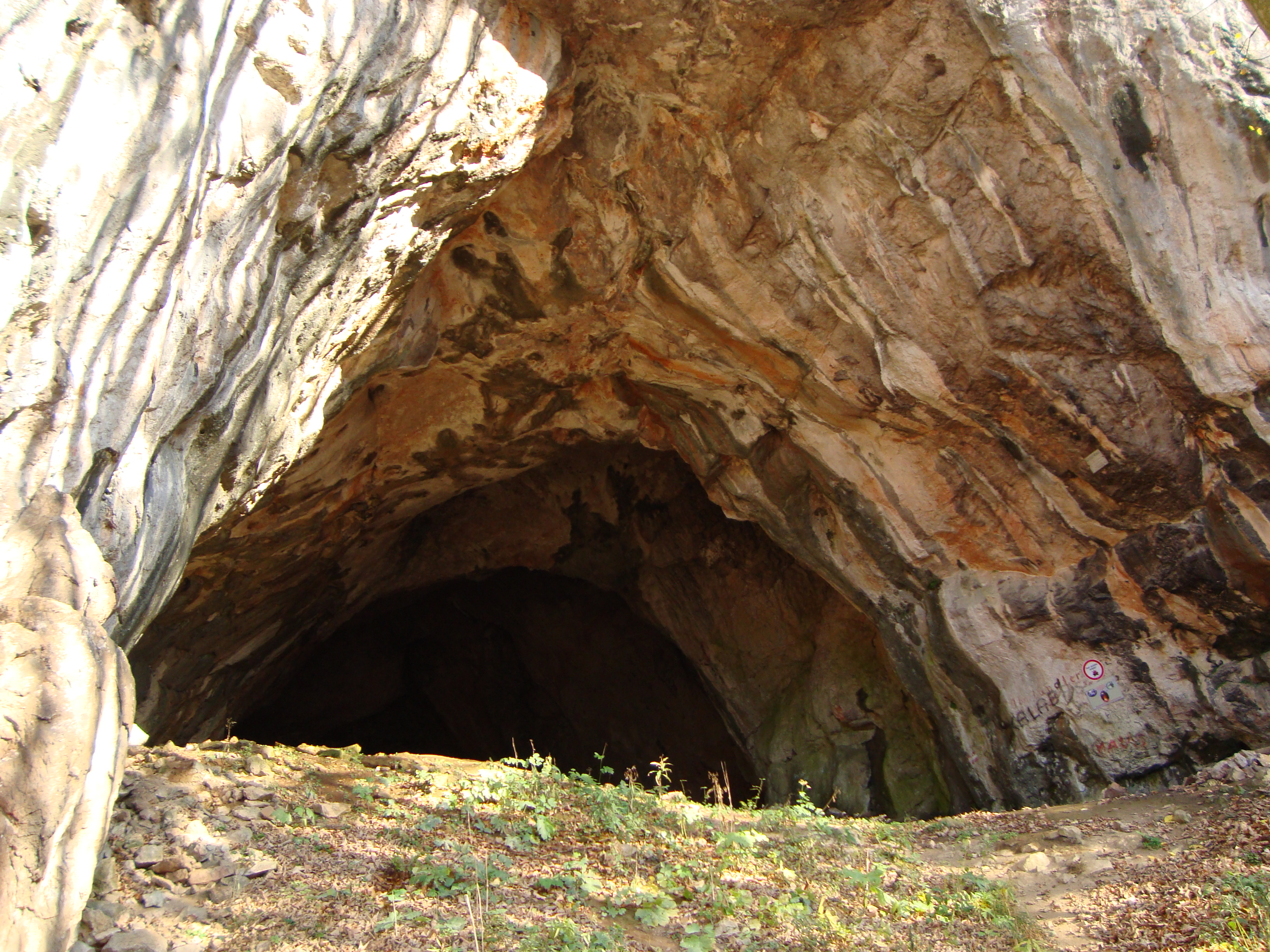
- Cave entrance

- Location in Austria
- 47°19′33″N 15°22′46″E
- Periods: Palaeolithic
- Cultures: Aurignacian
- Location: near Mixnitz
- Region: Styria, Austria

Site notes
- Length: 542 m (1,778 ft)

Drachenhöhle or Drachenhöhle Mixnitz (literally Dragon's Cave of Mixnitz) is a 542 m (1,778 ft) long cave with a 20 m (66 ft) wide and 12 m (39 ft) high entrance near Mixnitz, Styria, Austria, south-east of Bruck an der Mur located at an elevation of 950 m (3,120 ft) above sea level. Cave bear of the species (Ursus ingressus) and other bone fossils that people found during the Middle Ages were deemed to be the bones of dragons, a belief that culminated in the saga of the "Dragon slayer of Mixnitz". The cave is one of the largest caves in the Alps where bears occupied an area that stretched over a length of way over 500 m (1,600 ft), by an average width of up to 40 m (130 ft) and a height of 10 to 15 m (33 to 49 ft).

Due to a shortage of fertilizers during and after World War I the 8 to 10 m (26 to 33 ft) high sediments inside the cave were intensively mined between 1918 and 1923 of which around 2,500 tons of phosphoric acid were extracted. During the fertilizer mining, several geologists and paleontologists were present, who only documented the most valuable discoveries. Nonetheless, a rich cache of cave bear, Eurasian cave lion (Panthera leo spelaea), Gray wolf (Canis lupus), Alpine ibex (Capra ibex) and Alpine marmot (Marmota marmota) fossils, remains of open hearths and Paleolithic stone tools of the Aurignacian culture dated to 65,000 to 31,000 BCE were unearthed. Dated to between 65,000 and 31,000 BCE, these rank among the oldest traces of human presence in Austria.

== Excavations ==
Records of archaeological work were published in a monograph in 1931, that was re-edited by Othenio Abel and G. Kyrie. Excavations took place at two locations inside the cave. The around 150,000 years old sediment's strata were divided into several layers, that among those named "Prehistoric layer" and "Paleolithic fireplace" also yielded a "Neanderthal layer".

To this day the bones of more than 30,000 cave bear fossils were excavated. The site was protected in 1928 and declared a natural monument in 1949.
