= Beate Hofmann =

German Lutheran bishop

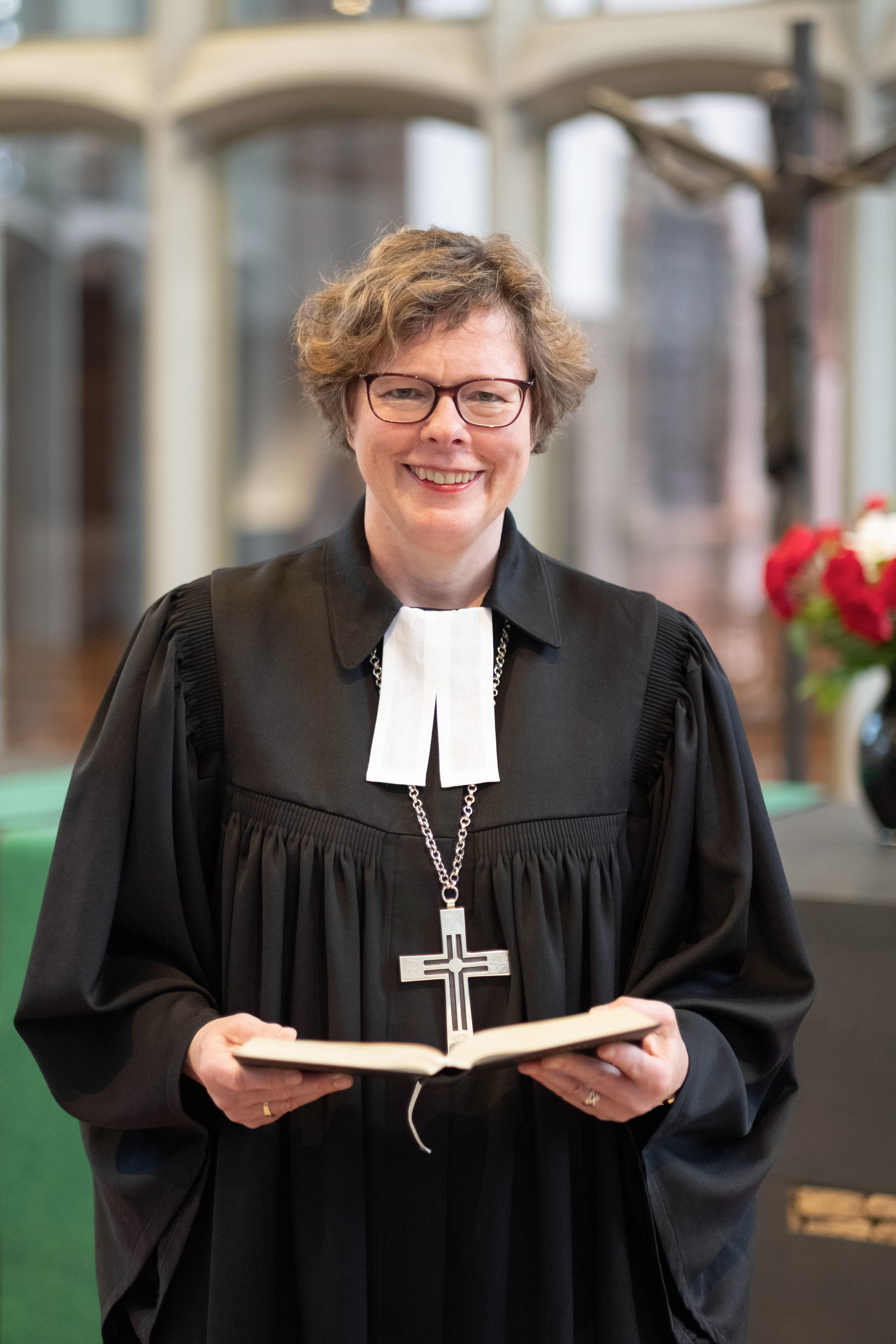
- Born: October 15, 1963 (age 62); Bad Tölz
- Occupation: Clergyman

Beate Hofmann (born October 15, 1963 in Bad Tölz) is a German Lutheran bishop.

== Life ==
Hofmann studied Lutheran theology at Kirchliche Hochschule Bethel (now part of Bielefeld University), Heidelberg University, Northwestern University, University of Hamburg, and LMU Munich. On October 31, 1993, she was ordained pastor in the Evangelical Lutheran Church in Bavaria. Until 1996 she was a pastor at Reformations-Gedächtnis-Kirche in München-Großhadern.

In 1999, she was awarded a Ph.D. in practical theology by LMU Munich. From 1998 to 2003 she was the theological director of studies at Diakonie Neuendettelsau, and from 2003 to 2013 a professor at Lutheran University in Nuremberg (now Lutheran University of Applied Sciences Nuremberg). In 2012, she completed her habilitation at Augustana Divinity School Neuendettelsau with an empirical study on religious education for adults, and was appointed professor for diaconal science and diaconal management at the Kirchliche Hochschule Wuppertal/Bethel in 2013, where she became the director of the Institut für Diakoniewissenschaft und Diakoniemanagement (Institute for Diaconal Studies and Diaconal Management) in 2017.

Hofmann was elected bishop of Evangelical Church of Hesse Electorate-Waldeck in 2019.

== Works by Hofmann ==
- Gute Mütter – starke Frauen: Geschichte und Arbeitsweise des Bayerischen Mütterdienstes. Kohlhammer Verlag, Munich 2000. ISBN 978-3-17-016190-0 [Zugleich Dissertation, 1999].
- Sich im Glauben bilden: der Beitrag von Glaubenskursen zur religiösen Bildung und Sprachfähigkeit Erwachsener. Evangelische Verlagsanstalt, Leipzig 2013. ISBN 978-3-374-03176-4
- Diakonische Unternehmenskultur. Ein Handbuch für Führungskräfte, together with Cornelia Coenen-Marx, Otto Haussecker, Dörte Rasch and Beate Baberske Krohs, Kohlhammer Stuttgart 2008, Second edition 2010, (Reihe Diakonie: Bildung – Gestaltung – Organisation Bd. 2). ISBN 978-3-17-021502-3.
- Together with Martin Büscher: Diakonische Unternehmen multirational führen: Grundlagen – Kontroversen – Potentiale. Nomos, Baden-Baden 2017. ISBN 978-3-8452-8662-4.
- Together with Cornelia Coenen-Marx: Symphonie, Drama, Powerplay - Zum Zusammenspiel von Haupt- und Ehrenamt in der Kirche. Kohlhammer Stuttgart 2017. ISBN 978-3-17-032216-5.
- Together with Barbara Montag: Theologie für Diakonie-Unternehmen. Funktionen – Rollen – Positionen, Kohlhammer Stuttgart 2018. ISBN 978-3-17-034588-1.
