= Heinrich Zimmer =

German Indologist and linguist (1890–1943)

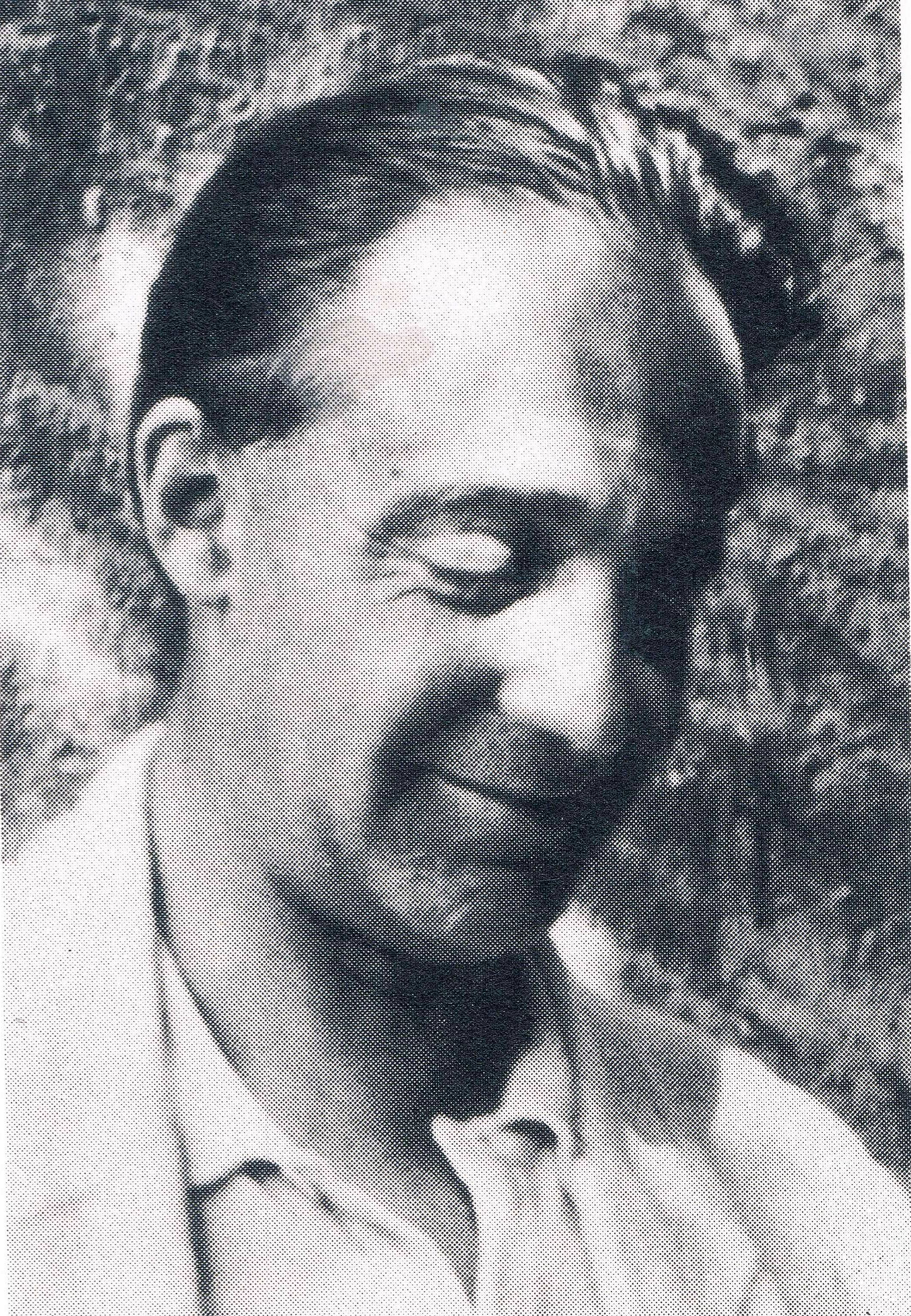
- Heinrich Zimmer (1933)
- Born: 6 December 1890; Greifswald, German Empire
- Died: 20 March 1943 (age 52); New Rochelle, New York, US
- Education: University of Berlin
- Occupations: Academic, Indologist, linguist, and historian of South Asian art
- Spouse: Christiane von Hofmannsthal (m. 1929)

Heinrich Robert Zimmer (6 December 1890 – 20 March 1943) was a German Indologist and linguist, as well as a historian of South Asian art, most known for his works, Myths and Symbols in Indian Art and Civilization and Philosophies of India. He was the most important German scholar in Indian philology after Max Müller (1823–1900).

== Early life and education ==
He was born in Greifswald, Germany. Zimmer began studying Sanskrit and linguistics at the University of Berlin in 1909. He earned his doctorate in 1914 with a thesis entitled Studien zur Geschichte der Gotras and directed by Heinrich Lüders.

He completed his Ph.D. in philology and comparative linguistics in 1914 at the University of Berlin.

== Career ==
Between 1920 and 1924, he lectured at the University of Greifswald, moving to Heidelberg University to fill the Chair of Indian Philology (1924–1938).

In 1938, he was dismissed by the Nazis based on the fact that his Christian wife was the great-great-granddaughter of a Jewish Austrian, and he emigrated to England, where between 1939 and 1940 he taught at Balliol College, Oxford. In 1940 he moved to New Rochelle, New York, where he eventually accepted a visiting lecturer position in philosophy at Columbia University. Here, Joseph Campbell, who was then working on his first book, A Skeleton Key to Finnegans Wake (1944) attended his lectures. The two men became good friends.

Zimmer died unexpectedly of pneumonia in 1943, two years after his arrival in the United States. According to Joseph Campbell, "Zimmer was at the opening of what would have been the most productive period of his career. . . hardly had he begun to find his stride, however, when, suddenly stricken, he passed from full career to his death within seven days." After Zimmer's death, Campbell was given the task of editing and posthumously publishing Zimmer's papers, which he did over the next 12 years, turning Zimmer's lecture notes into four books, in the Bollingen Series: Myths and Symbols in Indian Art and Civilization, Philosophies of India, The Art of Indian Asia, and The King and the Corpse, which in turn became Zimmer's lasting legacy.

=== Work ===
"On all levels there are rituals capable of transforming man. But it is everywhere the tradition and trend to rank the spiritual, sublime practices above the sensual and magical ones, since the general course of cultural development has favored the spiritual element over the material and feminine. This development has taken place under the predominance of the male principle. But with the cult of the Great Goddess in late Hinduism, the archaic heritage of sensual earth-bound rites rises once again overwhelmingly to the zenith."

— Zimmer, The Indian World Mother, (1938)

Zimmer's method was to examine religious images using their sacred significance as a key to their psychic transformation. His use of (Indian) philosophy and religious history to interpret art was at odds with traditional scholarship. His vast knowledge of Hindu mythology and philosophy (particularly Puranic and Tantric works) gave him insights into the art, insights that were appreciated by Joseph Campbell among others. Campbell edited many of Zimmer's writings after his death. In the foreword to Zimmer's book, Artistic Form and Yoga in the Sacred Images of India, Campbell makes reference to a memorial to Heinrich Zimmer, which was read at the New York Oriental Club meeting in the spring of 1949: "Dr. Zimmer stood alone, forming a class by himself, not only for the wide range of subjects he was proficient in, but also for his unique genius of interpretation. . . Zimmer strove to understand both Eastern and Western ideas from Universal conceptions lying at the root of spiritual and psychological developments everywhere." The psychiatrist Carl Jung also developed a long-standing relationship with Zimmer, and incidentally edited a volume of Zimmer's entitled Der Weg zum Selbst (The Way to the Self). The two men first met in 1932, after which Zimmer, along with Richard Wilhelm, became one of the few male friends of Jung.

Zimmer is credited by many for the popularizing of Hindu art in the West, as he was the first to identify the radical difference between Western classical and Indian art.

== Personal life ==
In 1929 he married Christiane von Hofmannsthal (1902–1987), daughter of Austrian novelist Hugo von Hofmannsthal and Gertrud (née Schlesinger) von Hofmannsthal. Her younger brother, Raimund von Hofmannsthal, was twice married, first to American heiress Ava Alice Muriel Astor (whose daughter from a later marriage eventually married Zimmer's son) and Lady Elizabeth Paget (a daughter of Charles Paget, 6th Marquess of Anglesey). Together, they were the parents of:

- Andreas "Andrew" Peter Zimmer (1930–2003), who married Joyce Hylton.
- Clement Zimmer (c. 1932–1955), who died while a student at Wadham College, Oxford.
- Michael Johannes der Baptist Karl Maximilian Heinrich Hugo Zimmer (1934–2008), who married, and later divorced, Emily Sophia Harding, a daughter of Ava Alice Muriel Astor (the former wife of Christiane's brother, Raimund) and English journalist Philip John Ryves Harding in 1963. His longtime companion was Vera Graaf and his second wife was Véronique Sari.

Zimmer died of pneumonia in New Rochelle, New York, on March 20, 1943.

=== Schloss Prielau ===
In 1932, his wife's widowed mother, Gerty von Hofmannsthal bought Schloss Prielau in Zell am See and began restoring the castle. To avoid expropriation by the Nazis due to the family's Jewish heritage, she wanted to give the castle away to Christiane and Heinrich Zimmer, who could then have sold the property to Gustav Kapsreiter, a friend of the family, but the sale, which was initially approved, was ultimately prohibited and the family property was expropriated. Kapsreiter's attempts to acquire the property were unsuccessful, instead the sculptor Josef Thorak was able to acquire the property for ℛℳ 60,000, which at the time was described as a "small fifteenth-century residence, beautifully furnished and immaculately maintained". In 1947, however, Schloss Prielau was restituted to the von Hofmannsthal family.

== Heinrich Zimmer Chair for Philosophy and Intellectual History ==
A chair has been named after Heinrich Zimmer since 2010. The Heinrich Zimmer Chair for Indian Philosophy and Intellectual History is awarded by the Indian Council for Cultural Relations (ICCR) in New Delhi and is based both at the Cluster of Excellence "Asia and Europe in a Global Context" and at the South Asia Institute at Heidelberg University. The first holder of this new endowed chair in Indian philosophy and intellectual history was the Indian historian of science Dhruv Raina. Heeraman Tiwari, 2011–2012 the second holder of the Heinrich Zimmer Chair, was followed by Prof. Amiya Prosad Sen.

== Works ==
- Kunstform und Yoga im Indischen Kultbild (Artistic Form and Yoga in the Sacred Images of India [1926];Translated and edited by Gerald Chapple, James B. Lawson and J. Michael McKnight [1984])
- Maya: Der Indische Mythos. (1936)
- Der Weg zum Selbst (The Way to the Self) (1944)
- Myths and Symbols in Indian Art and Civilization. Edited by Joseph Campbell. (1946)
- Hindu Medicine.Edited by Ludwig Edelstein.(1948)
- The King and the Corpse: Tales of the Soul's Conquest of Evil. Edited by Joseph Campbell. (1948)
- Philosophies of India. Edited by Joseph Campbell. (1953). ISBN 0-691-01758-1.
- The Art of Indian Asia, its Mythology and Transformations. Completed and edited by Joseph Campbell. (1955)
- Heinrich Zimmer: Coming Into His Own. Edited by Margaret H Case. (1994)
