= Ivan Sergeyevich Obolensky =

American businessman (1925–2019)

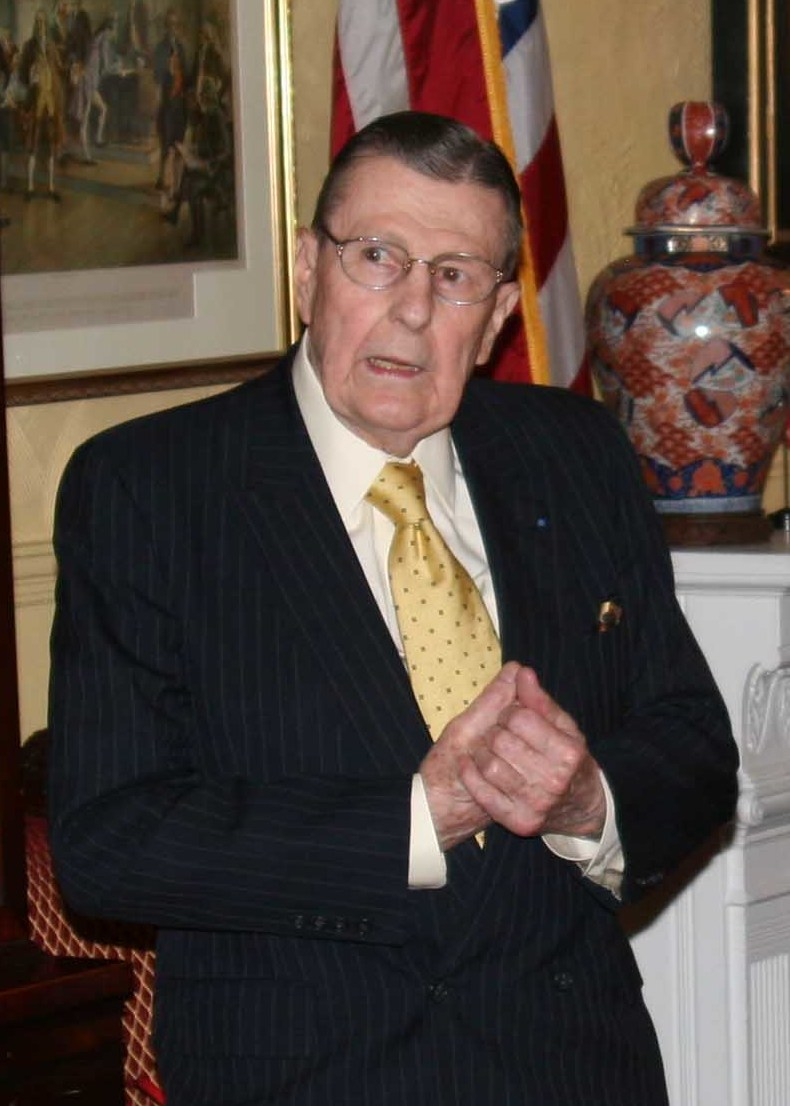
- Ivan Obolensky addresses the Soldiers', Sailors', Marines', Coast Guard and Airmen's Club, 2005
- Born: May 15, 1925; London, England
- Died: January 29, 2019 (aged 93); Manhattan, New York, U.S.
- Education: St. George's School
- Alma mater: Yale College
- Spouses: Claire Elizabeth McGinnis (m. 1949; div. 1956) Mary Elizabeth Morris (m. 1959; died 2006)
- Children: 4
- Parent(s): Sergei Platonovich Obolensky; Ava Alice Muriel Astor
- Relatives: Astor family Obolensky family

Ivan Sergeyevich Obolensky (May 15, 1925 – January 29, 2019) was an American financial analyst and corporate officer. He was previously commissioned in the United States Navy, serving as a Flight Lieutenant, and had also been a publisher.

== Early life ==
Ivan Sergeyevich Obolensky-Neledinsky-Meletzky was born in London, England, on May 15, 1925, to Prince Sergei Platonovich "Serge" Obolensky and Ava Alice Muriel Astor. Paternally, he belonged to the Obolensky family of Russian princes who trace their lineage to the Rurikid rulers of Kievan Rus who preceded the Romanov emperors. His mother was the only daughter of John Jacob Astor IV, who died on the RMS Titanic, and is thus a member of the Astor family.

Obolensky was educated at St. George's School in Middletown, Rhode Island, and graduated from Yale College in New Haven, Connecticut, in 1947. While at Yale, he was a member of St. Elmo, a senior secret society.

== Career ==
After Yale, Obolensky became a writer working for Telavid Inc. Imports, and went on to serve with the United States Navy as a pilot. In 1957, he formed a publishing firm McDowell, Obolensky Inc. alongside David McDowell. The firm published James Agee's Pulitzer Prize-winning novel A Death in the Family (1957), Little Blue and Little Yellow by Leo Lionni (1959), Joan Didion's debut novel Run, River (1963), and was the U.S. publisher for Chinua Achebe's Things Fall Apart (1959). It was dissolved in 1960. Obolensky then formed a second publishing house, Ivan Obolensky, Inc. This firm continued through 1965, when he joined the investment banking firm of A. T. Brod & Company as a partner. The publishing house continued until 1968 under the name Astor-Honor.

Throughout his main career on Wall Street as a financial analyst, Obolensky covered many prestigious accounts. He was Vice President of Moseley, Hallgarten, Estabrook & Weeden Inc., Stock brokers and Vice President of Shields & Company. Obolensky was an active member of the philanthropic community in New York. He was, for many years, an active supporter of the Soldiers', Sailors', Marines', Coast Guard and Airmen's Club, and New York's International Debutante Ball, which benefits the club. He was also Treasurer of the Russian Nobility Association in America, Inc., and the US Prior of the Orthodox Order of St. John.

== Personal life ==
Obolensky first married in New York City on October 10, 1949, to Claire Elizabeth McGinnis (1929–2015). Claire was educated at the Convent of the Sacred Heart and at Miss Burke's School, both in San Francisco, and at Finch College in Manhattan. She was the daughter of Felix Signoret McGinnis (1883–1945), vice-president of the Southern Pacific Company, and Clara (née Leonhardt) McGinnis (1887–1984). Before their divorce in 1956, Ivan and Claire were the parents of one daughter and two sons:

- Marina "Maria" Ivanovna Obolensky (b. 1951), who married N. Carlton. She later married William D. Folwick (1932–2017).
- Ivan Ivanovich Obolensky (b. 1952), who married Mary Jo Smith without issue.
- David Ivanovich Obolensky (b. 1953), who married Mary Catherine Hicks (b. 1952) on March 21, 1981; they are the parents of two daughters.

After their divorce, Claire married designer and art advisor Garrick C. Stephenson (1927–2007). On October 22, 1959, Obolensky married for the second time to Mary Elizabeth Morris (1934–2006). Together, they were the parents of one son:

- Sergei Ivanovich Obolensky (b. 1960), who married Cecelia Chapman Justice (b. 1956) in 1986; they are the parents of two sons.

== Death ==
Ivan Obolensky died on January 29, 2019. His funeral was held at the Church of the Incarnation in New York City.

== See also ==
- Burke's Peerage & Baronetage
