= Schloss Prielau =

Coordinates: 47°20′33″N 12°48′21″E

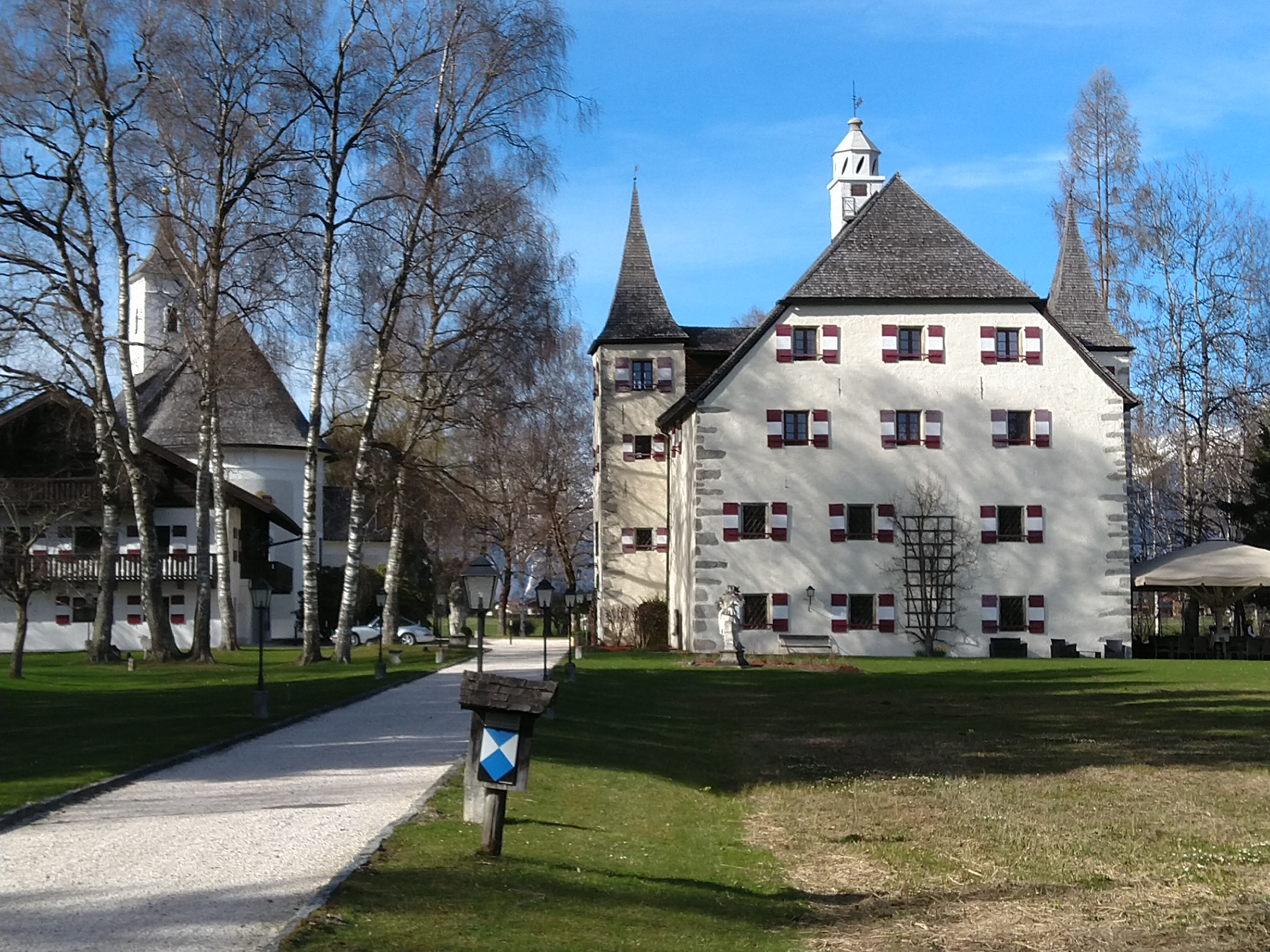
Schloss Prielau, 2022

Schloss Prielau or Prielau Castle (also called Prilla or Prüel) is a former prince-bishop's hunting lodge on the shore of Lake Zell in the municipality of Maishofen in the district of Zell am See in Salzburg, Austria. The castle, which is used as a hotel, is under German Foundation for Monument Conservation.

== History ==
Schloss Prielau was first mentioned in 1425 under Christian Glaser zu Prielau. In 1466, Polycarp von Hunt owned the farm. The building was rebuilt between 1560 and 1565 by Hans Christoph Perner von Rettenwörth into the general structure you see today. In 1577, Caspar Panicher owned Wolckersdorff and included it in his name. At that time, Panicher was a provost in the Fusch and a judge in Zell am See. He was succeeded by his daughter Anna, who married to Christoph von Hirschau. In 1590, the property passed into the possession of Dietrich Kuen-Belasy, Freiherr von Chiemsee, and remained in Kuen-Belasy's possession until 1722 when the Diocese of Chiemsee acquired the property. In 1803, the diocese was secularized. The last prince-bishop to use the palace was Sigmund Christoph von Waldburg-Zeil-Trauchburg (whose coat of arms can still be seen on the castle gate). In 1811, the castle was auctioned off to the sacristan Anton Neumayer.

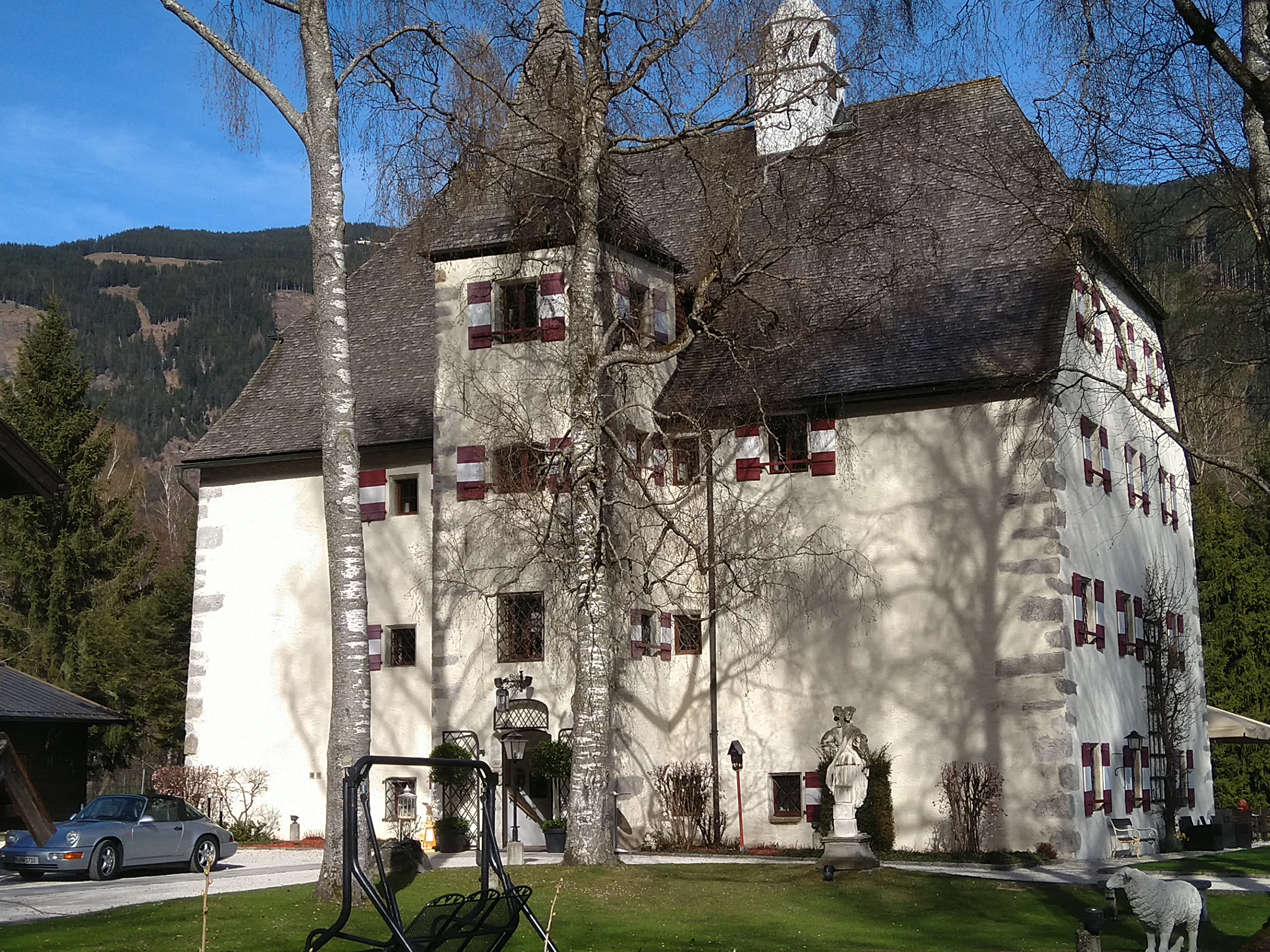
Schloss Prielau, 2022

In 1932, Gerty von Hofmannsthal, the widow of the Austrian novelist, librettist, and dramatist Hugo von Hofmannsthal, bought the property and began restoring the castle. She lived there with her son Raimund and his wife Lady Elizabeth von Hofmannsthal (née Paget) (the second daughter of Charles Paget, 6th Marquess of Anglesey). To avoid expropriation by the Nazis due to the family's Jewish heritage, she wanted to give the castle away to her daughter Christiane (née von Hofmannsthal) Zimmer and her husband German indologist Heinrich Zimmer, soon after buying it. Christiane could then have sold the property to Gustav Kapsreiter, who was a friend of the family, but the donation, which was initially approved, was ultimately not approved and the family was expropriated. Kapsreiter's attempts to acquire the property were unsuccessful, instead the sculptor Josef Thorak was able to acquire the property for ℛℳ 60,000, which at the time was described as a "small fifteenth-century residence, beautifully furnished and immaculately maintained". Otto Wächter occupied the property next door. In 1947 Schloss Prielau was restituted to the von Hofmannsthal family.

=== Hotel ===
In 1987, the Porsche family bought the property and converted it into a hotel with several guest rooms and suites. It has a park, a red deer farm, a private beach on the northern shore of the lake, a golf course, a helicopter landing and a wellness area with sauna, steam bath and massage services. There is a baroque chapel on the site where 30 to 40 marriages are held each year.
