= Raimund von Hofmannsthal =

Austrian-born author and businessman

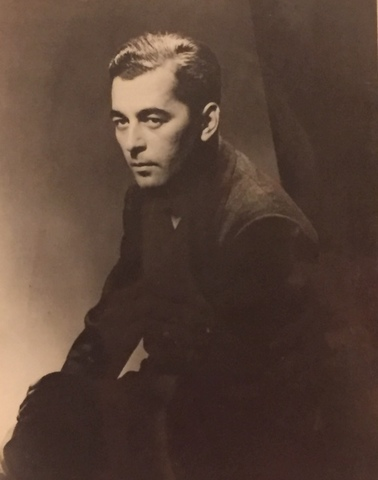
- Born: 26 May 1906; Vienna, Austria-Hungary
- Died: 20 March 1974 (aged 67); Marylebone, London, England
- Occupations: Writer, businessman
- Spouses: Ava Alice Muriel Astor (m. 1933; div. 1939) Lady Elizabeth Paget (m. 1939)
- Children: 4, including Sylvia
- Father: Hugo von Hofmannsthal

Raimund von Hofmannsthal (26 May 1906 – 20 March 1974) was an Austrian-born author and representative of an American newsreel firm in London.

== Early life ==
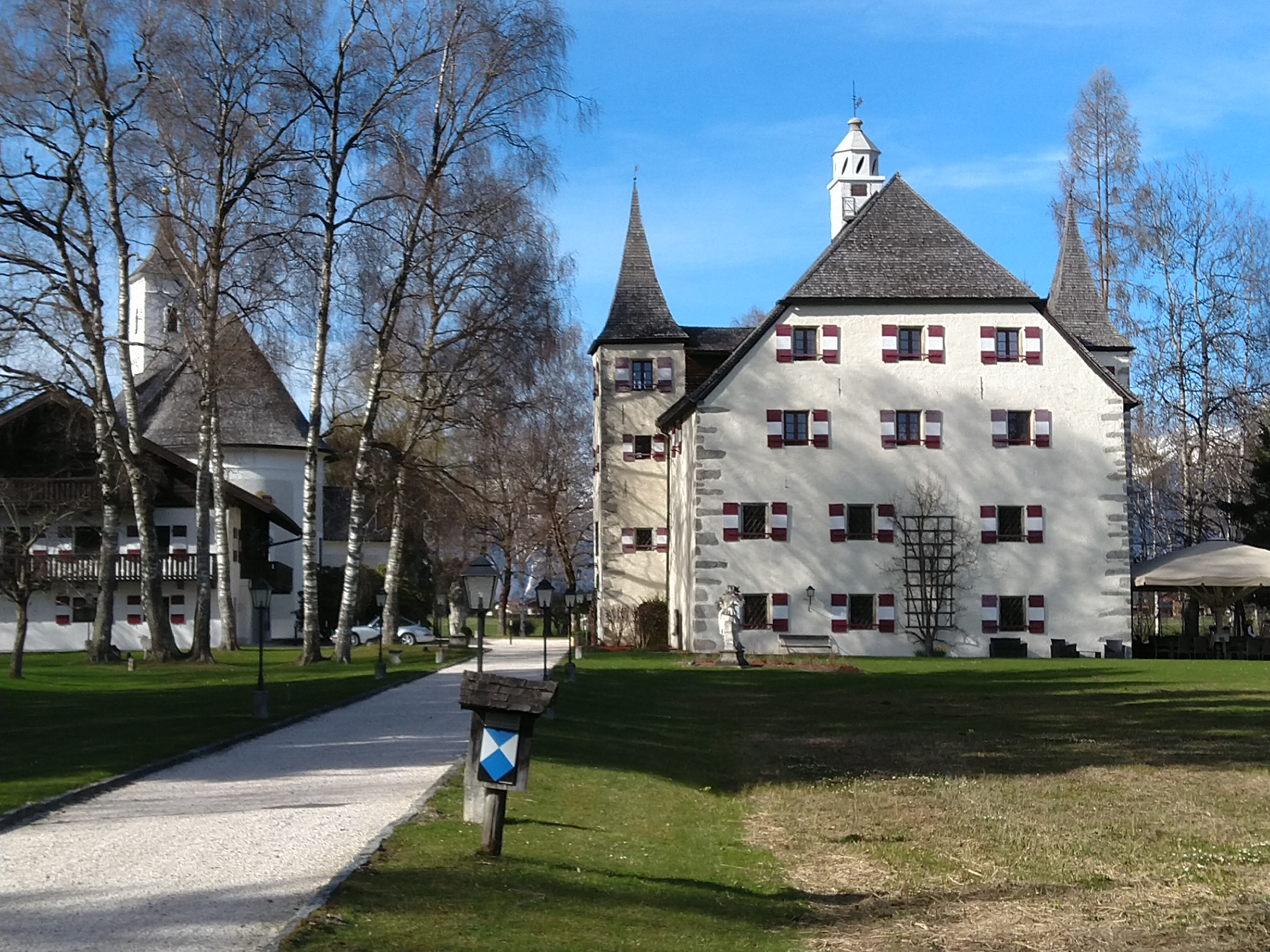
Schloss Prielau, the Hofmannsthal family castle on the shores of the lake at Zell am See

Hofmannsthal was born 26 May 1906 in Vienna, into the ennobled Hofmannsthal family. He was the youngest child of Gertrud "Gerty" Schlesinger, and Hugo von Hofmannsthal, an Austrian novelist, librettist, and dramatist, who settled in Hofmannsthal-Schlössl, Rodaun (now part of Liesing, Vienna), once owned by Countess Maria Karolina von Fuches-Mollard, the governess of Empress Maria Theresa. His sister, Christiane, married German indologist Heinrich Zimmer and they moved to New Rochelle, when he became a visiting lecturer at Columbia University. His father died of a heart attack in Vienna on 15 July 1929 as he was dressing for the funeral of Raimund's elder brother, Franz, who committed suicide at age 25 two days' prior. His mother died in London thirty years later in November 1959.

His paternal grandparents were the former Anna Maria Josefa Fohleutner, an upper-class Christian Austrian, and Hugo August Peter Hofmann, Edler von Hofmannsthal, a Christian Austrian–Italian bank manager. His great-great-grandfather, Isaak Löw Hofmann, Edler von Hofmannsthal, from whom his family inherited the noble title "Edler von Hofmannsthal", was a Jewish tobacco farmer who was made a member of the hereditary nobility by the Emperor of Austria in 1835. (Note: Edler was, until 1919, the lowest rank of nobility in Austria-Hungary and Germany, just beneath a Ritter (hereditary knight), but above untitled nobles, who used only the nobiliary particle von before their surnames.) His mother, who converted to Christianity before their marriage, was the daughter of a Viennese Jewish banker.

== Career ==
Hofmannsthal was an author who had written several magazine articles. In 1930, he was in Hollywood where he was associated with the United Artists and Paramount Studios and was one of the promoters of an enterprise in which Max Reinhardt and other well-known Continental artists and producers were active. By the late 1930s, he was a representative of an American newsreel firm in London. He belonged to the small, highly successful band of Austrians who made their name in Britain and in the United States—with his friend Sir George Weidenfeld probably the best known of all."

In 1937, Hofmannsthal hosted the Duke of Windsor (formerly King Edward VIII) and his wife, Wallis Simpson, the Duchess of Windsor, in the Austrian Tyrol, at their estate, Schloss Kammer on Lake Attersee near Salzburg. His family owned Schloss Prielau, a 17th-century chateau on the shores of the lake at Zell am See, which had been seized by the Nazis because of their Jewish ancestry, but was restituted in 1947.

== Personal life ==
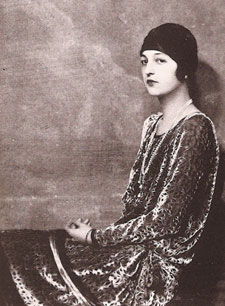
Photograph of his first wife, Ava Astor, c. 1920

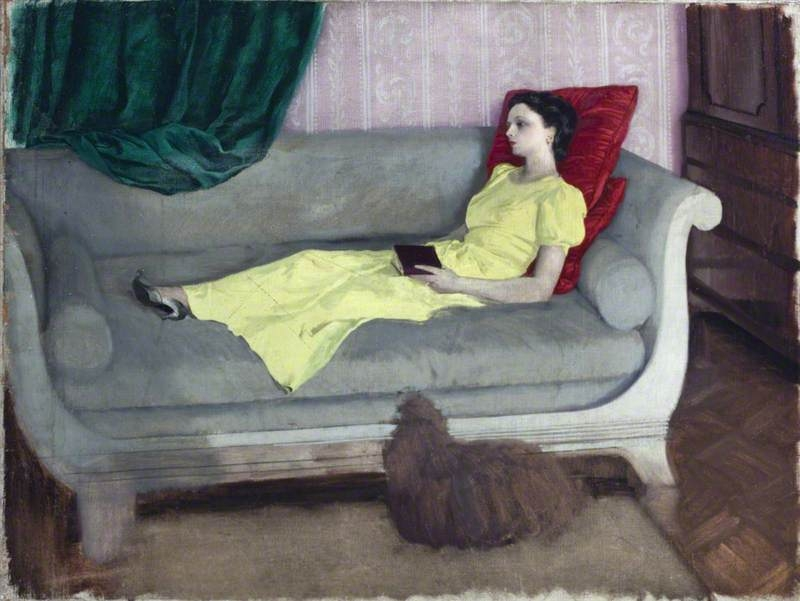
"A Girl in a Yellow Dress on a Sofa with a Dog", a portrait of his second wife, Lady Elizabeth Paget, by Rex Whistler, 1938

On 21 January 1933, von Hofmannsthal married Princess Obolensky, the former Ava Alice Muriel Astor (1902–1956), in the city court of Newark, New Jersey. Ava was the daughter of Col. John Jacob Astor IV (the wealthiest passenger to die in the sinking of the RMS Titanic) and, his first wife, Ava Lowle Willing (who married Thomas Lister, 4th Baron Ribblesdale in 1919). Although she was still married to her first husband, Prince Serge Obolensky (from whom she was divorced in December 1932), Hofmannsthal was said to be the father of their youngest child, Princess Sylvia Obolensky, who was born in May 1931. Before their divorce in 1939, they were the parents of another daughter:

- Romana von Hofmannsthal (1935–2014), who married Roderick McEwen, a son of Sir John McEwen, 1st Baronet, in 1958.

After his divorce, (Note: After their divorce, Ava Alice Muriel Astor married twice more, first to English journalist Philip John Ryves Harding (cousin to Maxwell Eley and Sir Geoffrey Eley) in 1940 (they divorced in 1945), and then to David Pleydell-Bouverie (a grandson of William Pleydell-Bouverie, 5th Earl of Radnor) in 1946 (they divorced in 1952) before her death in 1956. From her marriage to Harding, she was the mother of Emily Sophia Harding (1941–2019), who married Michael Zimmer (Raimund's nephew through his sister Christiane (née von Hofmannsthal) Zimmer), in 1963.) Hofmannsthal married Lady Elizabeth Hester Mary Paget (1916–1980) on 7 June 1939 at Chelsea, London. Lady Elizabeth was the second daughter of Charles Paget, 6th Marquess of Anglesey and Marjorie Paget, Marchioness of Anglesey (herself the eldest daughter of Henry Manners, 8th Duke of Rutland). Together, they were the parents of two children:

- Sarah Arabella Marjorie von Hofmannsthal (b. 1942), who married Baron Piers von Westenholz, son of Baron Henry von Westenholz and Marguerite Gordon Ness, in 1964. They divorced in 1969 and she married Michael FitzGerald Heathcoat-Amory, son of Maj. Edgar Heathcoat-Amory (a son of Ludovic Heathcoat-Amory and grandson of Sir John Heathcoat-Amory, 1st Baronet) and Sonia Myrtle Denison, in 1975. Michael's sister Amanda is the wife of Simon Cairns, 6th Earl Cairns. (Note: Michael FitzGerald Heathcoat-Amory (1941–2016) served as High Sheriff of Devon in 1985.)
- Octavian Charles Hugo von Hofmannsthal (b. 1946), who married Annabel Lea in 1977.

Hofmannsthal died in London on 20 March 1974. His funeral took place in Vienna.
