= Josef Thorak =

Austrian-German sculptor

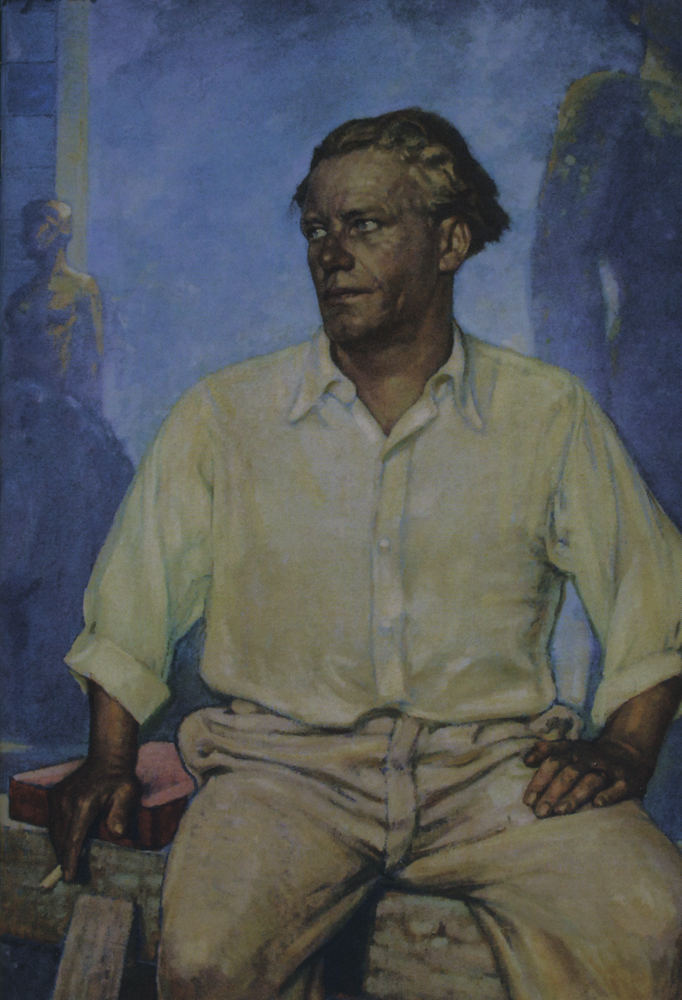
Josef Thorak by Fritz Erler, 1939

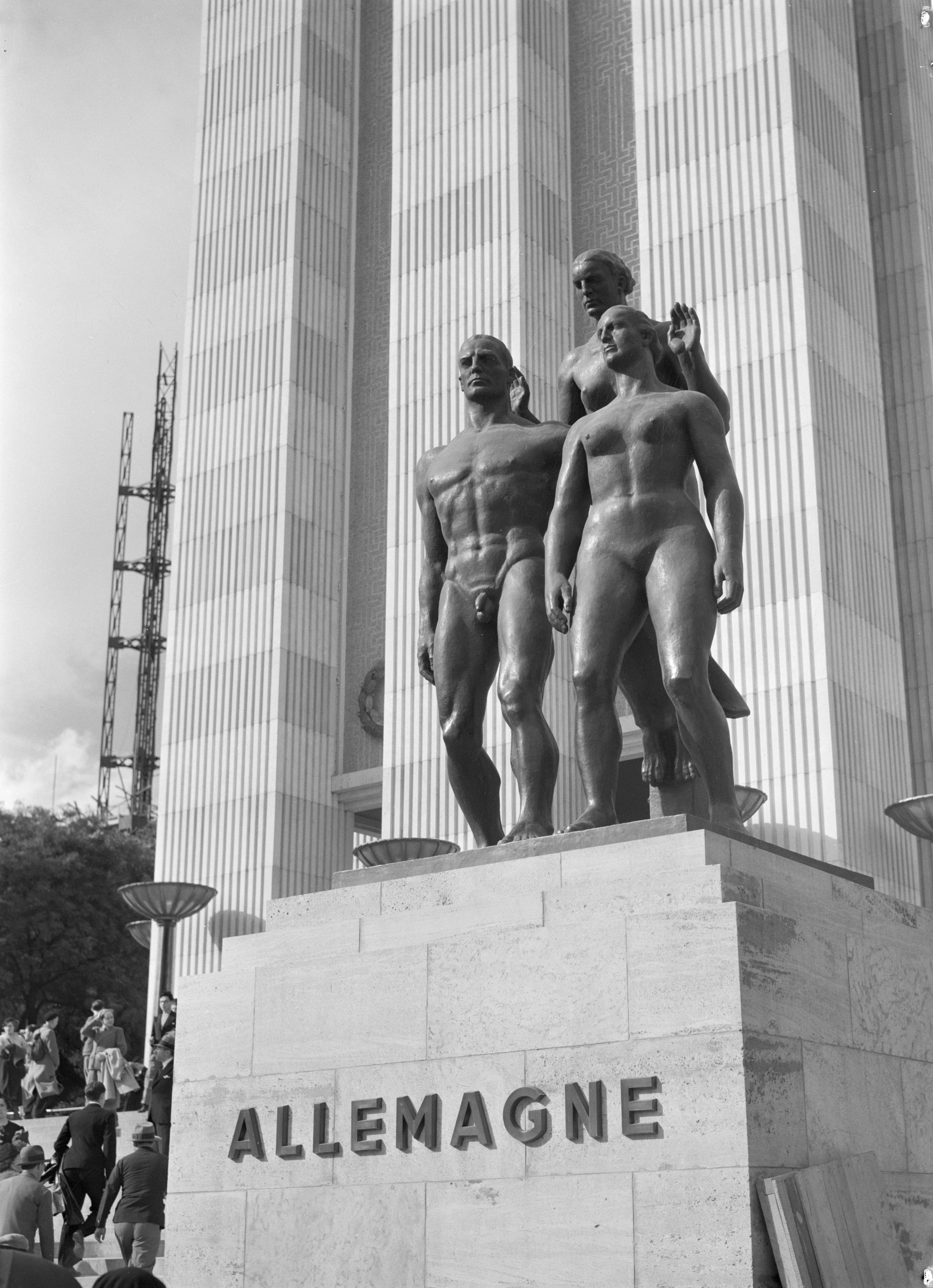
Familie (The Family), German Pavilion, 1937 Paris World's Fair

Josef Thorak (7 February 1889 – 25 February 1952) was an Austrian-German sculptor. He became known for oversize monumental sculptures, particularly of male figures, and was one of the most prominent sculptors of the Third Reich.

== Early life and education ==
Thorak was born out of wedlock in Vienna, Austria. His father, also Josef Thorak, was from East Prussia; his mother was from Salzburg, where she returned soon after his birth and the couple married in 1896. That year he was placed in a religious boarding school for neglected children, but his schooling ended after he set fire to his bed in late 1898 and was injured by a nun disciplining him, which led to a dispute in the press and the courts. In 1903 he began an apprenticeship as a potter in Slovakia; after completion of this and of journeyman years in Austria and Germany, he started work at a factory in Vienna and took classes from the sculptor Anton Hanak. From 1911 to 1915 he studied sculpture at the Academy of Fine Arts, interrupted by two periods of service in the First World War and a study trip to the Balkans. Julius von Schlosser, Director of the Kunsthistorisches Museum, recommended him and he secured a studio under Ludwig Manzel at the Prussian Academy of Arts in Berlin; he joined the Berlin Secession in 1917. Some expressionist influences can be noticed in his generally neoclassical style.

== Career ==
In Berlin in the 1920s, Thorak lived mainly on commissions to design cemetery monuments for soldiers, also assisting wealthy friends, many of them Jewish, with design work. He was helped by friendships with Hjalmar Schacht, President of the Reichsbank, and above all with the art museum director Wilhelm von Bode, who wrote a monograph on Thorak in 1929, said to have been his only book on a living artist. He won a state prize in 1928. To promote himself, he began calling himself "professor". His commissions were reduced by the German economic crisis of the 1920s and the Great Depression; eventually in 1932 he received a commission to design fittings for a church in Tegel, and he entered work in the sculpture event in the art competition at the 1932 Summer Olympics.

After the Nazis came to power in 1933, Thorak took advantage of friendships with many prominent members of the Party. Through the film maker Luis Trenker, he was engaged after Hanak's death in 1934 to complete the Emniyet monument (Security Monument; now the Güven (Trust) Monument) in Ankara, Turkey, and he sculpted busts of Joseph Goebbels and Ernst Hanfstaengl in addition to Mustafa Kemal Atatürk and Józef Piłsudski. After the death of Paul von Hindenburg in August 1934, Thorak sculpted his death mask; his bust of Mussolini was given as an official gift by Hitler in 1940. For a bust of Hitler, he stayed for several days in 1936 at Hitler's Obersalzberg compound. Alfred Rosenberg arranged a solo exhibition for him in 1935. He became wealthy and in 1937 or 1938 bought Schloss Hartmannsberg near the Chiemsee in Bavaria; in 1943 he also acquired Schloss Prielau, which had been seized from the family of Hugo von Hofmannsthal because of their Jewish ancestry. At Schloss Hartmannsberg he had a collection of medieval carvings and antique furnishings, some of which was obtained from the prominent Nazi art dealers Kajetan and Josef Mühlmann.

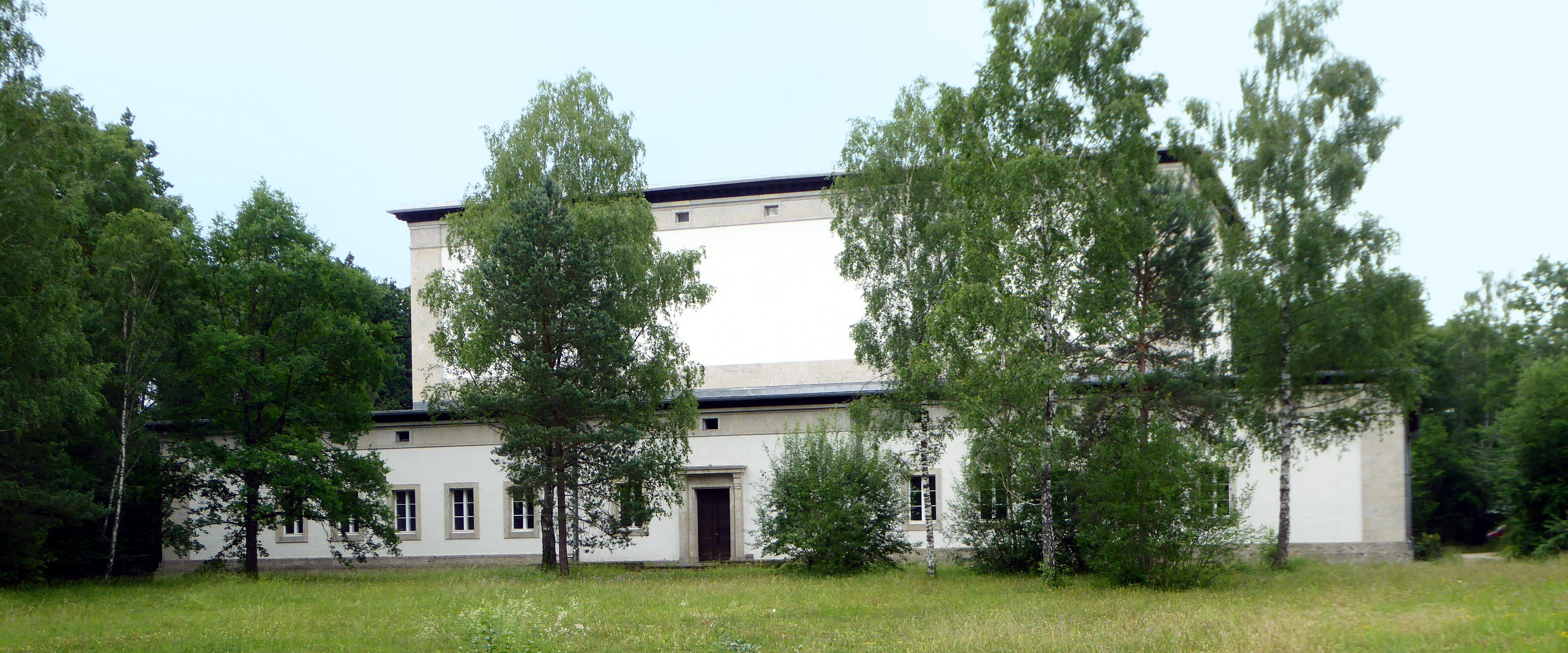
Thorak's studio in Baldham, near Munich, designed by Albert Speer in 1939

With Arno Breker, he became one of the two "official sculptors" of the Third Reich. In 1937, he was named professor of sculpture at the Munich Academy of Fine Arts; in 1939, Hitler decreed that a studio should be built for him in Baldham to Albert Speer's design. Although he did not join the Nazi Party until 1941, Hitler ordered his membership backdated to 1933 for appearance's sake. After a visit with Hitler to Thorak's studio in 1937, Goebbels described him in his diary as "our greatest sculptural talent. He needs to be given commissions." In his Spandau Diaries written in prison after the war, Speer referred to Thorak as "more or less my sculptor, who frequently designed statues and reliefs for my buildings". Well known for his "grandiose monuments", Thorak was nicknamed "Professor Thorax" because of his preference for muscular neo-classical nude sculpture, typically "gazing fervently into the distance". In the late 1930s, he became less popular with the Nazi leadership than Breker, because of his less voluptuous female nudes; he returned to favour during the war years after producing female statues expressing pathos.

== Later life and death ==
After the Second World War, Thorak at first produced decorative ceramics, and then focussed on religious sculpture. He was pronounced legally denazified in 1948 and, after two challenges, in July 1950 and finally in 1951, he was permitted to hold a final exhibition at the Mirabell Palace in Salzburg, which was well attended but poorly reviewed. His Austrian citizenship was restored in 1951. In February 1952, he died in Bad Endorf, Bavaria, and was buried with his mother in St. Peter's cemetery, Salzburg.

== Personal life ==
Thorak married three times. In 1918, he married Hertha Kroll; they had two sons, the older born before their marriage, in January 1917. The couple divorced in 1926 but continued to live together until her death in 1928. The following year he married Hilda Lubowski, with whom he had a third son, but after the Nazis came to power in 1933, the couple agreed to divorce because of her Jewish ancestry. She emigrated in 1939 to France and subsequently to England. In 1946, Thorak married Erna Hoenig, an American who had been living at Schloss Hartmannsberg since 1944; their son was born in 1949.

== Works ==
- 1922: Der sterbende Krieger (The Dying Warrior), World War I memorial in Stolpmünde, now Ustka, Poland
- 1928: Heim (Home) and Arbeit (Work), Charlottenburg
- 1936: Boxer, modelled on Max Schmeling, one of many sculptures commissioned for the grounds of the Olympic Stadium in Berlin.
- 1937: Familie (The Family) and Kameradschaft (Comradeship): 23-foot-tall figural groups outside the German pavilion at the Paris World's Fair, the latter consisting of two nude males clasping hands and standing defiantly side by side in a pose of racial camaraderie.
- 1937–43: Goddess of Victory sculptural group for the Nazi party rally grounds at Nuremberg, unfinished
- 1940: Der königliche Reiter (The Royal Rider), model for an equestrian monument to Frederick the Great in Linz, exhibited in 1943
- 1941: Couple
- 1942: Letzter Flug (Last Flight), wartime sculpture of a woman holding a dead soldier
- The Judgement of Paris, for a fountain.
- 1943: Paracelsus, commissioned for Salzburg
- 1943: Copernicus, also in Salzburg
- Denkmal der Arbeit (Monument to Work), for the Reichsautobahn: model exhibited in 1938–39, work unfinished. A group of workers (variously described as three, four, or five), 17 metres (56 ft) high, straining to move a boulder.
- 1949: Pietà, St. Peter's Cemetery, Salzburg, now over his grave

=== Reich Chancellery striding horses ===
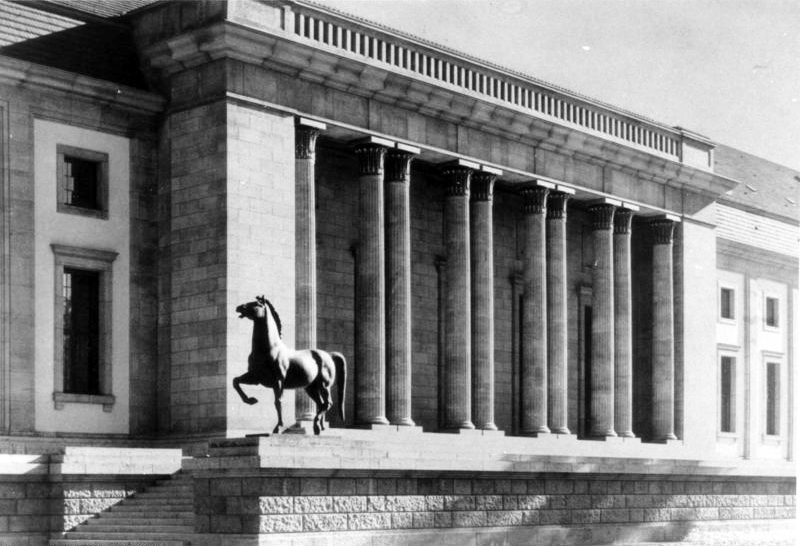
Neue Reichskanzlei, 1939

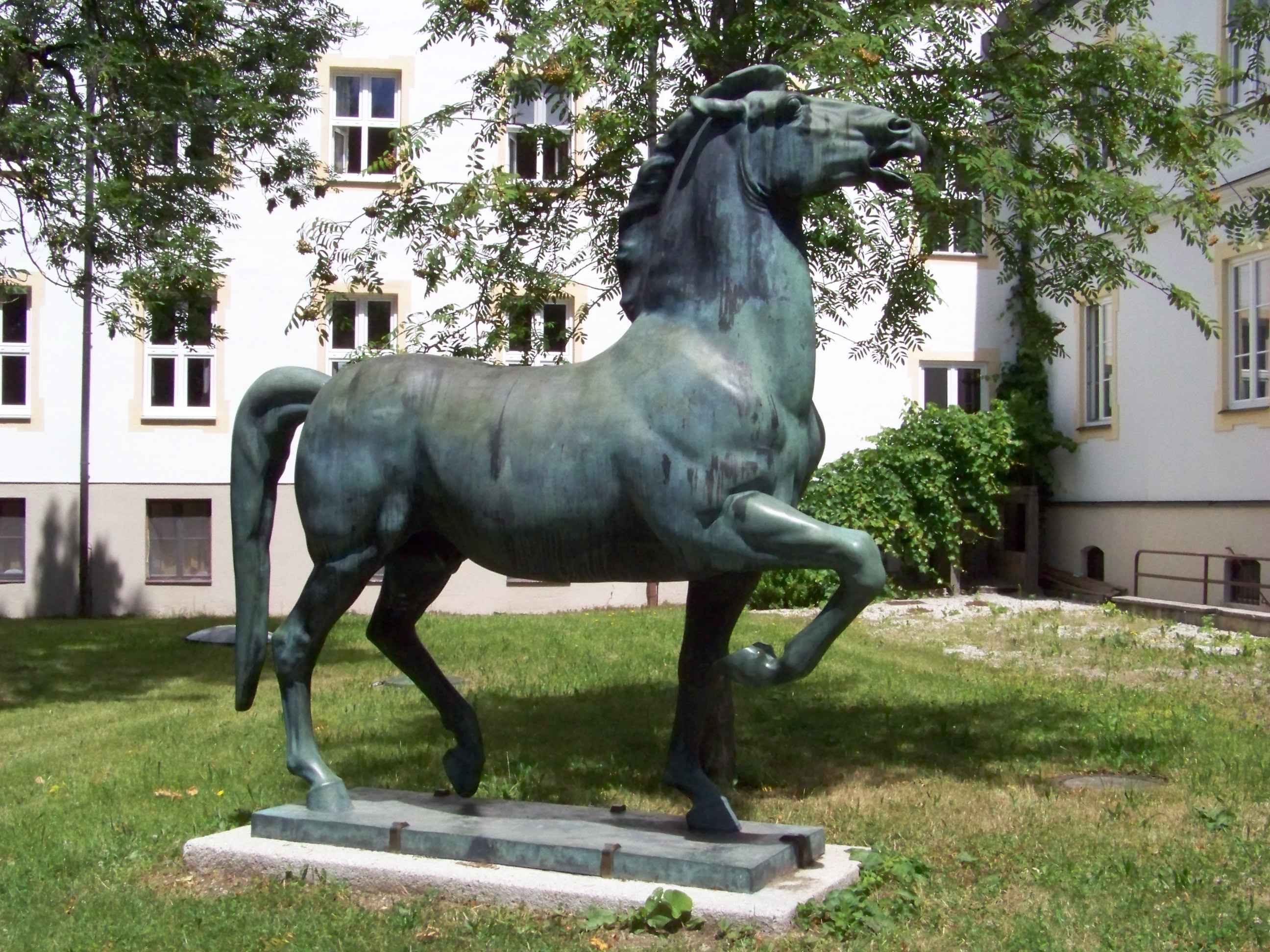
Bronze Striding Horse at Schloss Ising

In 1939, Thorak sculpted three oversize horses (3 metres (9.8 ft) high) for the Nuremberg rally grounds. Two of these, which had been placed in 1939 outside the Reich Chancellery built by Albert Speer, were discovered along with other Nazi art in a police raid on a storehouse in Bad Dürkheim, Rhineland-Palatinate, in May 2015. The two horses had been removed in 1989 from a barracks ground in Eberswalde, northeast of Berlin, at the time in East Germany, where they had sat since sometime after the Second World War. The third Thorak horse was displayed in the Haus der Deutschen Kunst in Munich as part of the Große Deutsche Kunstausstellung (Great German Art Exhibition) in 1939, then stood outside Thorak's studio. In August 2015, it was rediscovered on the grounds of a boarding school in Ising, Bavaria, Landschulheim Schloss Ising, having been donated to the school by Thorak's widow in 1961 in lieu of tuition fees for her son.

== Honours ==
Thorak received the grand prize of the Prussian Academy of Arts in 1928 and a golden Papal medal in 1934 for his contribution to the Exhibition for International Christian Art. He was nominated in 1937 for the first German National Prize for Art and Science. A street was named for him in Salzburg in 1963.

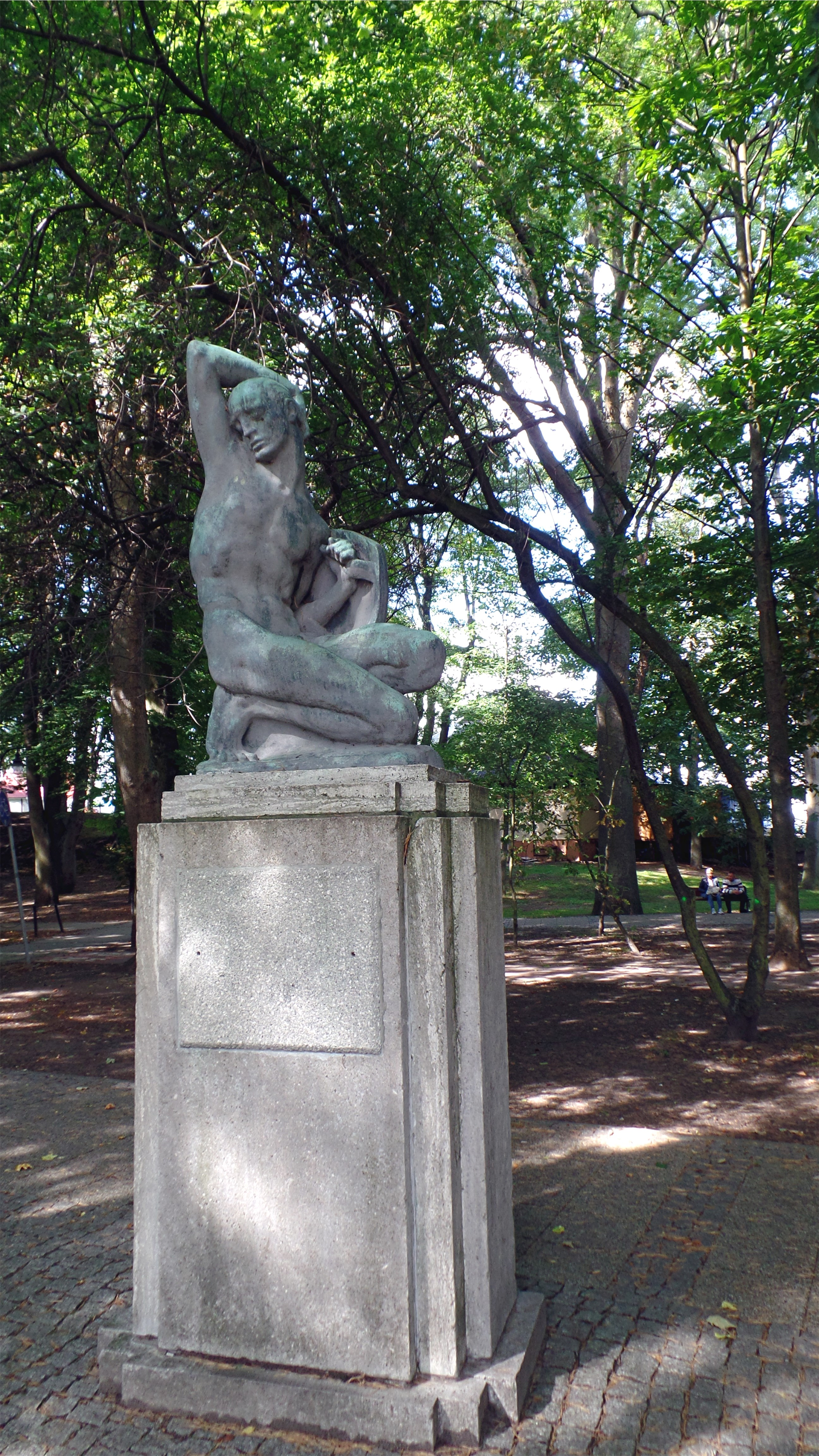
Dying Warrior (1922) Ustka

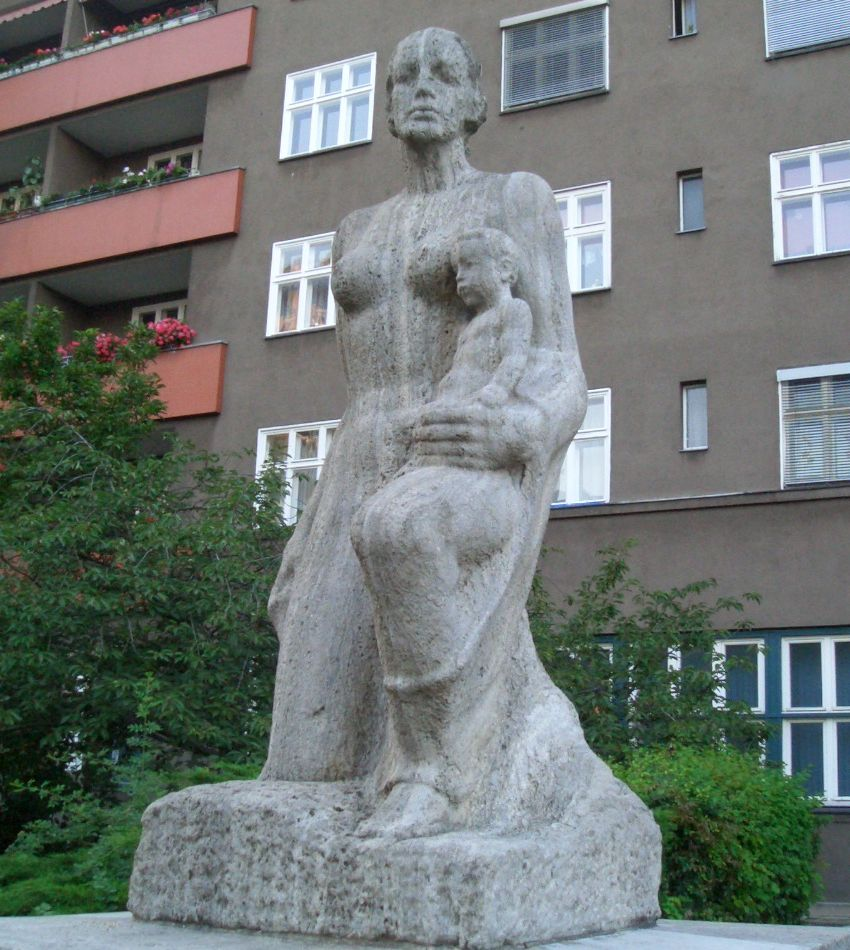
Home (1928) Charlottenburg

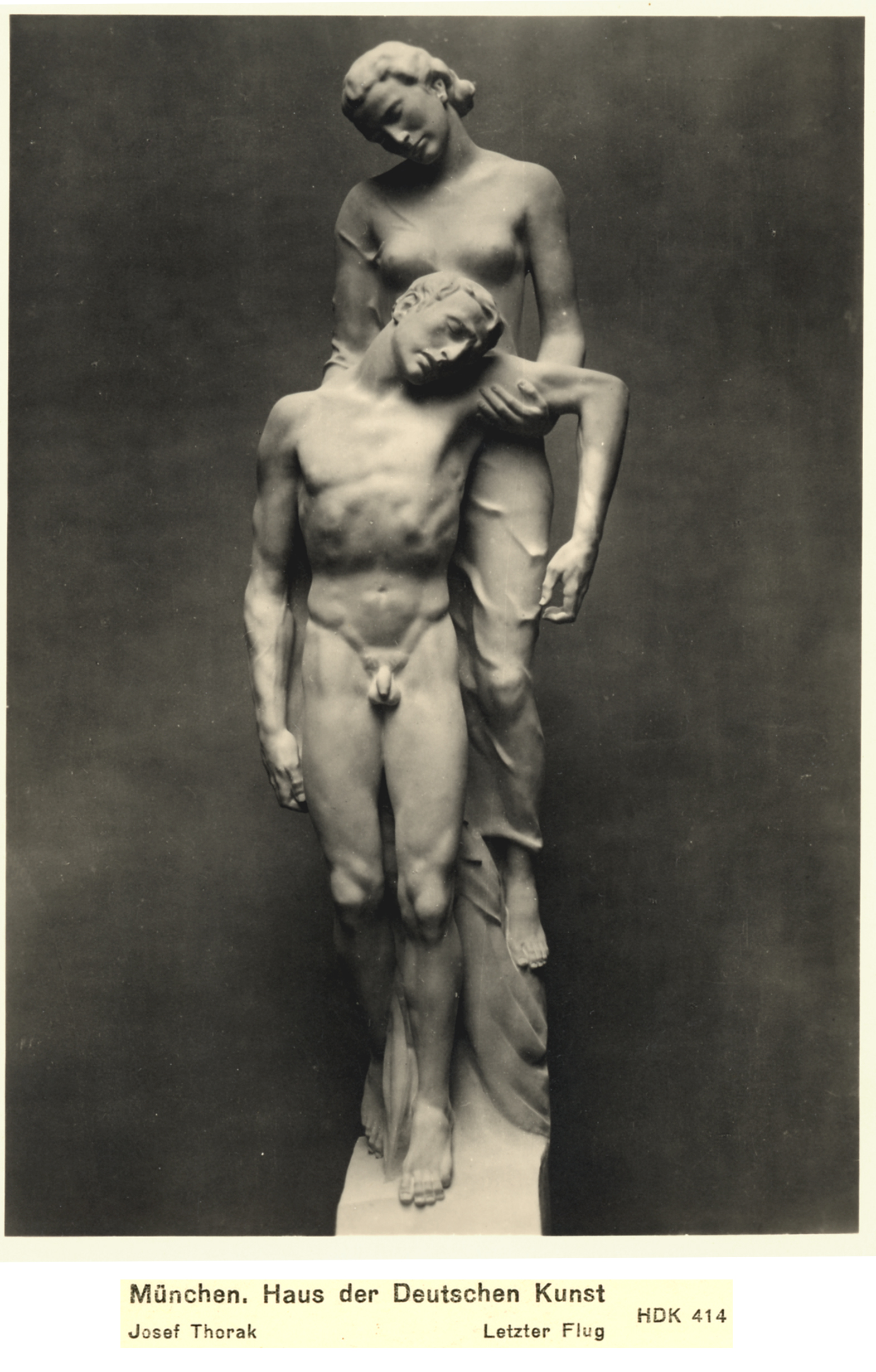
Last Flight (1942), exhibition postcard

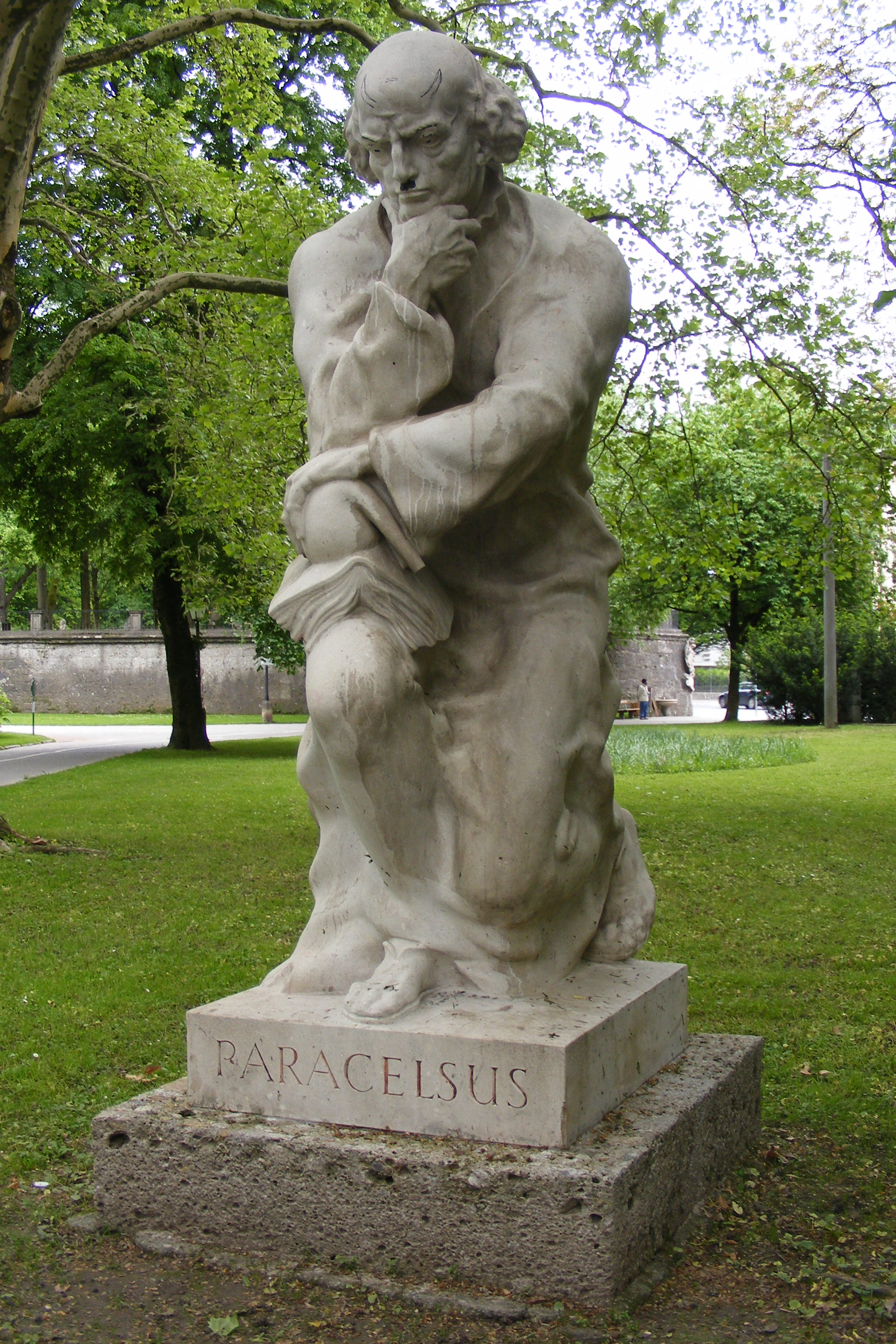
Paracelsus (1943) Salzburg

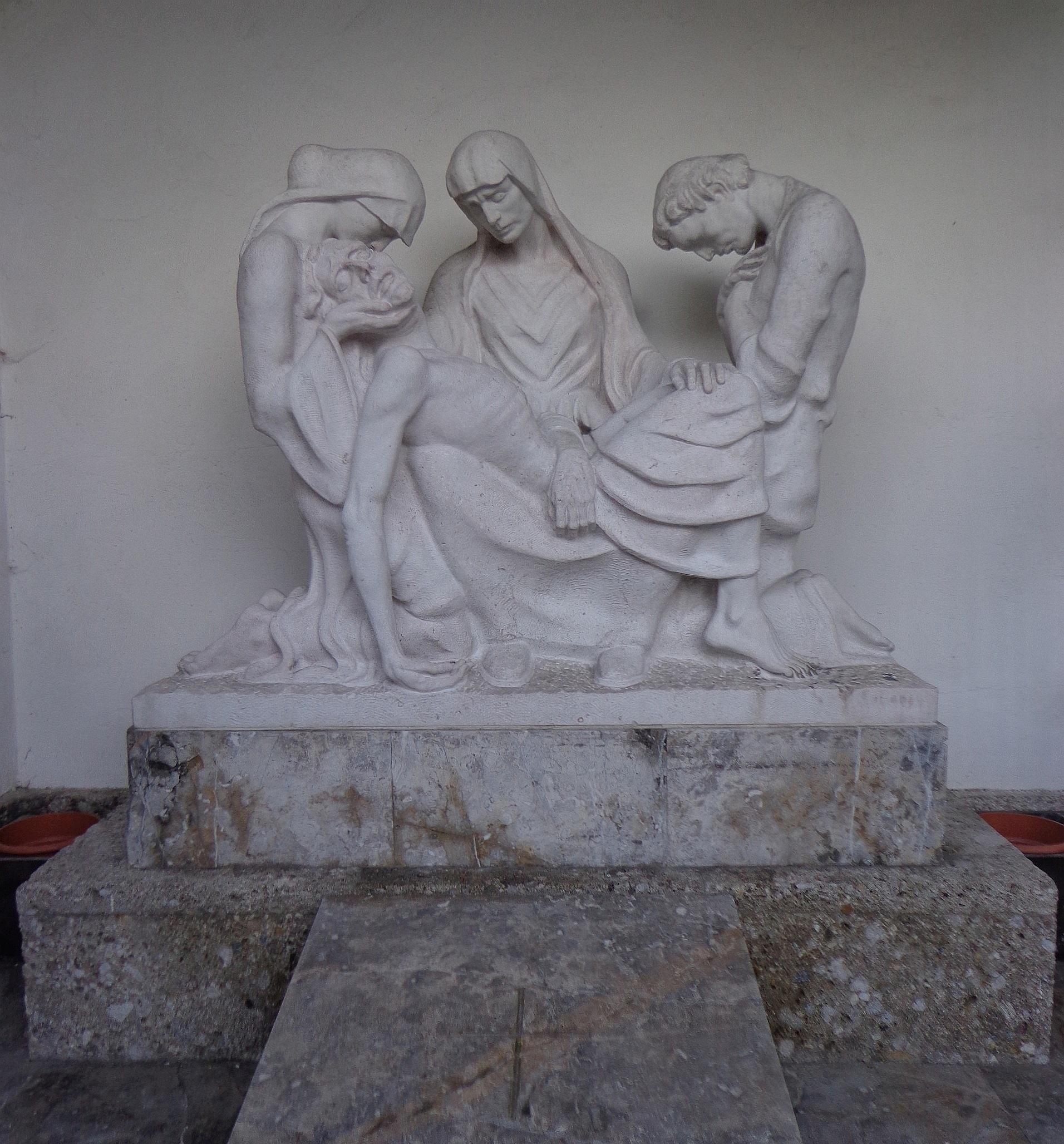
Pietà (1949) and grave, Salzburg

== See also ==
- Nazi architecture
