= Hofmannsthal =

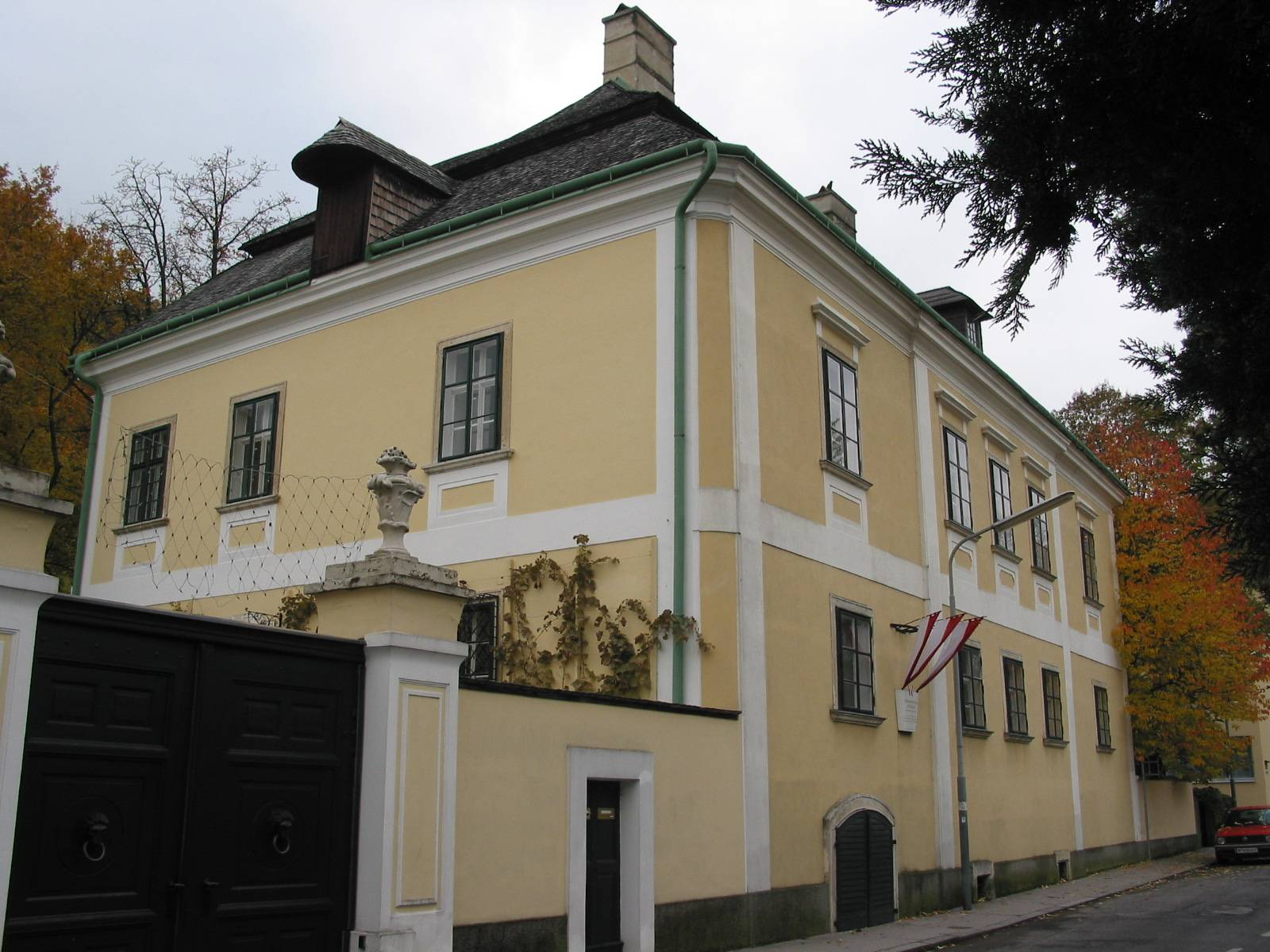
Schloss Hofmannsthal, family residence in Liesing, Vienna

The von Hofmannsthal is an Austrian noble family of Jewish origin. In 1835, the family was raised to the status of hereditary nobility in Austria by Emperor Ferdinand I and were since known as Edler von Hofmannsthal. Edler was a rank of nobility in Austria-Hungary and Germany, just beneath a Ritter (hereditary knight), but above untitled nobles. Members of the Hofmannsthal family distinguished themselves as merchants, industrialists, writers and librettists.

== Notable members ==
- Isaak Löw Hofmann, Edler von Hofmannsthal (1759–1849), Austrian merchant
- Augustin Emil Hofmann von Hofmannsthal (1815–1881), industrialist
- Hugo von Hofmannsthal (1874–1929), Austrian prodigy, writer, and librettist, married Gertrude Schlesinger (1880-1939)
  - Christiane von Hofmannsthal (1902–1987), married Heinrich Zimmer in 1929
  - Franz von Hofmannsthal (1903–1929), committed suicide
  - Raimund von Hofmannsthal (1906–1974), married 1) Ava Alice Muriel Astor (1902-1956) in 1933 2) Lady Elizabeth Hester Mary Paget (1916-1980)
    - Romana von Hofmannsthal (born c. 1935), married Rory McEwen in 1958
    - Sarah Arabella Marjorie von Hofmannsthal (b. 1946), married 1) Frederick Patrick Piers von Westenholz 2) Michael FitzGerald Heathcoat-Amory
    - Octavian Charles Hugo von Hofmannsthal (b. 1946), married Annabel Lea
      - Rodolphe von Hofmannsthal (b. 1980), married Lady Frances Armstrong-Jones (b. 1979), younger daughter of the 1st Earl of Snowdon in 2006

== See also ==
- Hoffman, a surname (including a list of people with that name)
- Hoffmann, a surname (including a list of people with that name)
- Hofman, a surname (including a list of people with that name)
