= Serge Obolensky =

Russian-American prince and businessman (1890–1978)

Prince Serge Obolensky
- Obolensky c. 1943
- Born: Sergei Platonovich Obolensky; October 3, 1890; Tsarskoye Selo, Saint Petersburg, Russian Empire
- Died: September 29, 1978 (aged 87); Grosse Pointe Farms, Michigan, U.S.
- Education: Oxford University
- Spouses: Catherine Yurievskaya (m. 1916; div. 1923) Ava Alice Muriel Astor (m. 1924; div. 1932) Marilyn Wall (m. 1971)
- Children: Ivan Sergeyevich Obolensky

Prince Sergei Platonovich Obolensky Neledinsky-Meletzky (November 3, 1890 – September 29, 1978), known as Serge Obolensky, was a Russian-born aristocrat then American citizen, U.S. Army colonel, socialite and publicist. He served as vice chairman of the board of directors of the Hilton Hotels Corporation.

== Early life ==
Obolensky's parents were Prince Platon Sergeyevich Obolensky-Neledinsky-Meletzky (1850–1913) and Maria Konstantinovna Naryshkina (1861–1929). He had a younger brother, Vladimir (1896–1968), who died unmarried and childless.

He was an enthusiastic polo player and played for his University Team at Oxford in 1914.

== Career ==
Obolensky was a soldier in two World Wars and in the Russian Civil War and fled his native country after battling Bolsheviks as a guerrilla fighter. He was a lieutenant colonel in the U.S. paratroopers and a member of the Office of Strategic Services (OSS), forerunner of the CIA, and made his first five jumps in 1943 at the age of 53.

After his second marriage, he settled in the U.S., working with his new brother-in-law, the real estate entrepreneur Vincent Astor. He also started a business, Parfums Chevalier Garde, with fellow emigre, Aleksandre Tarsaidze (1901–1978). Tarsaidze was president until 1940 when they were cut off from their French suppliers during World War II. When Obolensky was president of the Sherry-Netherland Hotel, Tarsaidze became his assistant. Tarsaidze later wrote a novel about the parents of Obolensky's first wife, Alexander II and Catherine Dolgorukov.

In 1949, he started his own public relations firm in New York City, Serge Obolensky Associates, Inc., handling accounts like Piper-Heidsieck champagne. "Serge", a friend once remarked, "could be successful selling umbrellas in the middle of the Sahara."

In 1958, Obolensky was made vice chairman of the board of Hilton Hotels Corporation. In the same year, he released his autobiography, One Man In His Time. The Memoirs of Serge Obolensky. He maintained a substantial art collection.

== Personal life ==
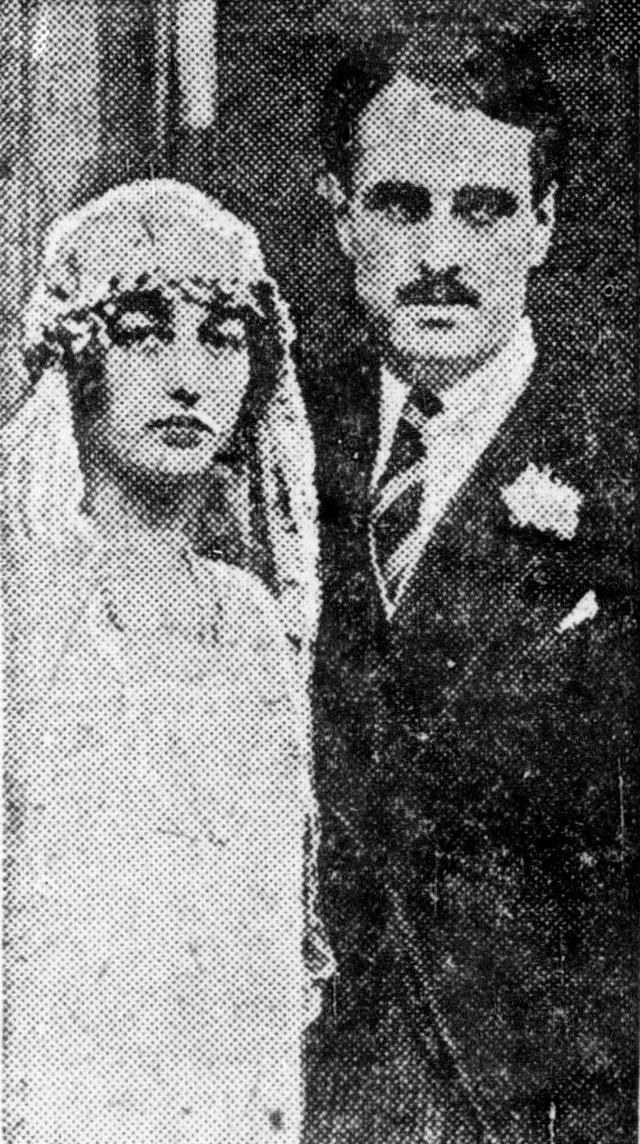
Photograph of Prince Obolensky and, his second wife, Ava Alice Astor, August 1924 The Indianapolis Times

On October 6, 1916, he married Princess Catherine Alexandrovna Yurievskaya (1878–1959) at Yalta. Catherine was the youngest daughter of Russian Emperor Alexander II (1818–1881) and his second, morganatic wife, Princess Catherine Dolgorukova (1847–1922), and was the widow of Prince Alexander Vladimirovich Baryatinsky (1870–1910), with whom she had two children. They divorced in 1924 without issue.

On July 24, 1924, he married Ava Alice Muriel Astor (1902–1956) in London, Middlesex. Ava was the daughter of John Jacob Astor IV (1864–1912) and his first wife Ava Lowle Willing (1868–1958). Before divorcing in 1932, Obolensky had one son with Ava: Prince Ivan Sergeyevich Obolensky (1925–2019), who married (1) Claire Elizabeth McGinnis div. 1956, and (2) Mary Elizabeth Morris.

Princess Sylvia Sergeievna Obolensky (1931–1997), was Ava's daughter with Raimund von Hofmannsthal. Ava and von Hofmannsthal would marry quietly in January 1933 after she and Obolensky divorced in 1932, but at the time of Sylvia's birth Ava was in Austria and still married to Obolensky. Sylvia married Jean-Louis Ganshof van der Meersch (1924–1982) in New York City on November 1, 1950, they divorced in 1957 without issue. She then married Prince Azamat Kadir Giray (1924–2001), at East Hampton, New York on August 11, 1957. He was the son of Kadir Giray, Prince of Crimea (1892–1953) and Vaguide Sheret-Luk, and had issue before divorcing in 1963. Through his father, Giray was a direct male line descendant of Genghis Khan and Börte through Jochi and the Khans of Crimea.

On June 3, 1971, he married for the third and final time to Marilyn Fraser-Wall (1929–2007) of Grosse Pointe Farms, Michigan, with whom he did not have children.

Obolensky died in 1978, and is buried in Holy Sepulchre Cemetery, Southfield, Michigan.

=== Honors ===
The "Serge Obolensky Room", at the back of the first floor at the Soldiers', Sailors', Marines', Coast Guard and Airmen's Club in Manhattan, memorializes his services as a soldier. Portraits and memorabilia festoon the walls.
