= The Lord Chandos Letter =

Literary work by Hugo von Hofmannsthal

A Letter (Ein Brief), usually known as The Letter of Lord Chandos or the Chandos Letter, is a prose work written by Hugo von Hofmannsthal in 1902. It is in the form of a letter dated August 1603 from a writer named Lord Philip Chandos (a fictional character) to Francis Bacon, and describes Chandos's crisis of language.

== Summary ==
The letter begins with a summary of the great literary feats that Chandos once achieved. Then Chandos writes of his current mental state. He has reached a crisis point in his career concerning language and its ability to adequately express the human experience. Chandos has abandoned all future written projects, which he once proposed with exuberance, because of his inability to express himself in a meaningful fashion.

Chandos describes the development of his crisis in stages. First came the loss of the ability to conduct academic discourse on matters of morality or philosophy. Next, he lost the function to make everyday conversation regarding opinions or judgments. Lastly he turned to the classics, works by Cicero and Seneca, in an attempt to cure his literary ailment but could make no sense of them and his condition continued to decline. Chandos describes his state at present as, "… [having] lost completely the ability to think or speak of anything coherently."

Chandos experiences extreme moments of transcendence, where epiphanies on life and the spirit overwhelm him. However, these moments are brief in nature and once they have passed Chandos is incapable of expressing the insight he uncovered moments before. These epiphanies are the highlight of Chandos' existence, and outside of them his life is stagnant and barren. Chandos often feels he is on the brink of recovery as thoughts begin to form in his mind. But like the epiphanies they are soon lost in his inability to write. This failure of language has robbed him of self-confidence and creativity. The result is Chandos as a broken man mourning his lost abilities. Chandos ultimately says he will write no more in any known language.

== Biographical and cultural content ==
The Lord Chandos Letter stands in stark contrast to Hofmannsthal's early works and poetry. He was a poet who had a command over language in his early poetry centered on the "inner self" that had characterized his time as a member of the elite literary circle Young Vienna ("Jung-Wien"). Instead, in his writing The Lord Chandos Letter, Hofmannsthal abandons poetry and his work on aesthetics much to the disappointment of his readers. The Lord Chandos Letter was written during the fin de siècle, a clash between the old social order and a development of new thought and means of expression. Central figures of this era such as Hofmannsthal, Sigmund Freud, Ernst Mach and Ludwig Wittgenstein witnessed the transformation of society but were dismayed by their inability to effect change in a modern society that was "hopelessly pluralistic; lacking in cohesion or direction". In his letter, Hofmannsthal mentions a sickness of the mind which emerged from the inability of language to sufficiently express oneself amidst social and political turmoil. The preoccupation with a crisis of language is most famously recognized in his Lord Chandos Letter.

Hofmannsthal's position on the subject of language closely resembled that of Ludwig Wittgenstein who dominated the discussion of the critique of language for nearly a century in Viennese society. Wittgenstein admired Hofmannsthal's work, especially The Lord Chandos Letter in which Hofmannsthal anticipated Wittgenstein's idea that "language is the limit of our world". The seemingly incompatible relationship between language and experience is a motif of twentieth century European works and manifested itself in art and music from Gustav Klimt and Arnold Schoenberg respectively.

== Critical analysis ==
Erwin Kobel is an example of a critic who uses biographical evidence from Hofmannsthal's life to show the autobiographical links between his life and the Lord Chandos Letter. Thomas Kovach argues that "so many critics viewed The Lord Chandos Letter as an autobiographical document" because of Hofmannsthal's personal literary crisis that stemmed from his own self-doubt. However, he continues to argue that while there are apparent autobiographical elements of the work, most critics agree that The Lord Chandos Letter is in fact a work of fiction. He supports this claim by revealing the anomaly that Hofmannsthal is able to eloquently write about a crisis of language. That this work is fiction is reinforced by the fact that Hofmannsthal had a literary career past the publishing of The Lord Chandos Letter, whereas Lord Chandos promises never to compose again.

Kovach presents another possible interpretation of the work. He writes that the crisis of language should be viewed as deeper than simply a predicament of communication and the limits of language. Since language is used to express thought, he concludes that the crisis examined by Hofmannsthal should be seen as one of cognition in addition to one of language; he asserts that Chandos is unable to write clearly because he is unable to think clearly.

Another opinion on The Lord Chandos Letter is that it is evidence of an existential crisis. This existential crisis is related to the reconstruction of fin-de-siècle Vienna and the ensuing crisis felt by society. With the transition to an industrial society, forms and manners of expression previously deemed effective were no longer capable of articulating the thoughts and ideas of Viennese society.

Michael Morton, another critic, views the crisis reflected in The Lord Chandos Letter as a set of predicaments. He feels Hofmannsthal expresses dilemmas of the self and of language. He argues that Chandos' crisis is a conflict between viewing the self as a subject or as an object. The second conflict he sees in the work is a conflict regarding the functionality and usefulness of language. In terms of the utility of language, Morton presents the tension between ideas being built around language rather than vice versa, language attempting to have more power than it is meant to have, and language trying to explain ideas and truths above its capabilities.

Jacques Le Rider analyzes Hofmannsthal's choice of Francis Bacon as the recipient of the letter. Le Rider recognizes elements of Ernst Mach's works within The Lord Chandos Letter; Francis Bacon can be identified as the individual who laid the foundation for the work of Ernst Mach. Ernst Mach's works discuss the elimination of barriers between "inside and outside, the self and the world".

== Bibliography ==
- Contemporary Authors Online, Gale, 2003
- Dictionary of Literary Biography, Volume 118: Twentieth-Century German Dramatists, 1889–1918, A Bruccoli Clark Layman Book, Edited by Wolfgang D. Elfe, University of South Carolina and James Hardin, University of South Carolina. The Gale Group, 1992. pp. 115–131.
