= Heeraman Tiwari =

Professor at JNU

- Born: 1 November 1961 (age 64); India
- Education: University of Lucknow, University of Delhi, Oxford University
- Occupation: Professor
- Spouse: Anu Khanna

Heeraman Tiwari (born 1 November 1961) is a Professor of Centre for Historical Studies, School of Social Sciences, at the Jawaharlal Nehru University, New Delhi and his core areas of study include Sanskrit Language, Literature, Intellectual History and Philosophy.

== Early life ==
Heeraman Tiwari was born on 1 November 1961. Tiwari attended Lucknow University for his B.A. and M.A. He joined the University of Delhi for his Ph.D. and The University of Oxford for his D.Phil. His 1994 D.Phil thesis at Oxford University was entitled "From Form to Universal: The Evolution of a Theory of Universals in Early Brahmanical Philosophy" under the supervision of Professor Bimal Krishna Matilal, and Professor Richard Gombrich.

== Books ==
- Matilal, Bimal Krishna. (1998). The character of logic in India. Ganeri, Jonardon., Tiwari, Heeraman. Albany: State University of New York Press. ISBN 0-585-05930-6. OCLC 42855334.

== Career ==
1. Heeraman Tiwari worked at the BBC World Service in London as research analyst and broadcaster.
2. Working in Centre for Historical Studies, Jawaharlal Nehru University (JNU), New Delhi and presently working as Professor.
3. Former interim dean of the Atal Bihari Vajpayee School of Management and Entrepreneurship (ABVSME), Jawaharlal Nehru University (JNU), New Delhi from January 2019 to July 2020
4. He was appointed as a National Instructor of ARPIT (Online Refresher Course in History).
5. Heeraman Tiwari was the Heinrich Zimmer (Chaired) Professor of Indian Philosophy and Intellectual History, at Ruprecht-Karls University, Heidelberg, Germany (2011-2012).
6. Heeraman Tiwari served as a Senior (Professorial) Fellow (2014-2015), Israel Institute for Advanced Studies, Hebrew University of Jerusalem.
7. He is a member of the Foundation Committee, Raja Rammohun Roy Library Foundation, Ministry of Culture, Government of India
8. Stand-in Finance Officer (2017-2019), Jawaharlal Nehru University (JNU),

== Personal life ==
He is married to Dr. Anu Khanna, who has done her Ph.D. in immunochemistry from the Oxford University, Oxford, England.
