= Sylvia Guirey =

Heiress, artist and art patron

- 1957 newspaper photo
- Born: Princess Sylvia Sergeyevna Obolensky; 18 May 1931; Vöcklabruck, Austria
- Died: 27 June 1997 (aged 66); Fulham, London, England
- Education: Brearley School; Art Students League
- Occupations: Painter and patron
- Spouses: Jean Louis Ganshof van der Meersch (m. 1950; div. 1957) Prince Azamat Kadir Sultan Guirey (m. 1957; div. 1963)
- Children: 3
- Parent(s): Ava Alice Muriel Astor; Raimund von Hofmannsthal

Sylvia Guirey (née Princess Sylvia Obolensky; 18 May 1931 – 27 June 1997) was an heiress, artist and art patron.

== Early life ==
Guirey was born on 18 May 1931 in Vöcklabruck, Austria. Her mother was Ava Alice Muriel Astor and her father was Raimund von Hofmannsthal. Her parents would marry quietly in January 1933 after her mother divorced in 1932, but at the time of her birth, her mother was in Austria and still married to Prince Serge Obolensky, a former Tsarist officer. During World War II, her mother was in London and she was in New York. She did not see her mother until 1946. She had been educated at home and then went onto the Brearley School.

== Career ==
In the 1950s, she was working with Eugene Berman as she had become interested in stage design. She worked in with Berman on the new production for the Metropolitan Opera of Don Giovanni.

In 1958, her grandmother died and left her a substantial sum that enabled her to take an interest in contemporary art. She began to buy pop-art pieces and at the same time her home at Elm Place became popular with artists and dealers. She also took a studio on her own account and created enough paintings to start exhibiting. Her work was at the Sao Paulo Biennale in 1973, and three years later she was in the Betty Parsons Gallery. She continued to exhibit in the US and the UK at the Hester van Royen Gallery and the Benjamin Rhodes Gallery.

== Personal life ==
On 1 November 1950, she married Belgian financier Jean Louis Ganshof van der Meersch at the Church of the Holy Trinity in New York. In 1957, her husband obtained a divorce based on their separation and her friendship with Prince Guirey.

She married again to Prince Azamat Kadir Sultan Guirey (1924–2001), a son of Vaguide Sheretlock Guirey and Prince Kadir Guirey, a descendant of the Tatar khans who ruled Crimea before the Czars, in 1957. They moved to London and, before their divorce in 1963, they had three children together:

- Prince Kadir Guirey.
- Prince Sagat Adil Temujin Guirey, who married Marina Sarah Peto, daughter of Sir Michael Peto, 4th Baronet, in 2001.
- Princess Selima Sultane Guirey, who married Derek Goddard, a musician who worked with The Clash, The Raincoats, and Neneh Cherry.

Prince Azamat later married Frederica Ann "Bobo" Sigrist, daughter of Fred Sigrist (a Nassau born heiress who was previously married to Kevin McClory, who directed several James Bond films) Guirey died in Fulham in England in 1997. Prince Azamat died in 2001.
