= Aleksandre Tarsaidze =

Aleksandre Tarsaidze

Alexandre Tarsaidze (Georgian: ალექსანდრე ტარსაიძე, Alek'sandre Tarsaidze; Russian: Александр Георгиевич Тарсаидзе, Aleksandr Georgievich Tarsaidze) (1901–1978) was a Georgian-American writer and historian who authored several works on the life in Imperial Russia, the Romanov family, the history of Georgia and the Russian Imperial Naval officers.

He was born on June 22, 1901, in Tbilisi, in the family of Giorgi Tarsaidze, the first Georgian ophthalmologist. His uncle was the famous Georgian writer Rafiel Eristavi. Tarsaidze was a student of the Imperial Naval Academy in Petrograd at the time of the 1917 revolutions. In 1918, he returned to his native Georgia, which declared independence on May 26, 1918, and worked with the Allied High Commissioner, Colonel William N. Haskell in Tiflis until being forced into exile by the Red Army invasion of Georgia. He then worked for the Istanbul-based American Relief Administration and emigrated to the United States in 1923.

He was employed by several cosmetic and jewelry enterprises including the Matchabelli Perfumes run by the émigré Georgian Prince Georges V. Matchabelli. During World War II, he served in the United States Army Military Intelligence. He then was associated with Prince Serge Obolensky in the hotel business in New York and worked as a freelancer and public relations agent until his death in New York in 1978.

Tarsaidze's main works are: Морской корпус за четверть века, 1901-1925 (The Naval Corps for a Quarter of the Century, 1901-1925; NYC, 1944), Czars and Presidents. The Story of a Forgotten Friendship (NYC, 1958), Четыре мифа о Первой мировой (Four Myths about the First World War; NYC, 1969), Katia: Wife before God (NYC, 1977).
