= Soldiers', Sailors', Marines', Coast Guard and Airmen's Club =

Organization in New York City

Coordinates: 40°44′53″N 73°58′42″W

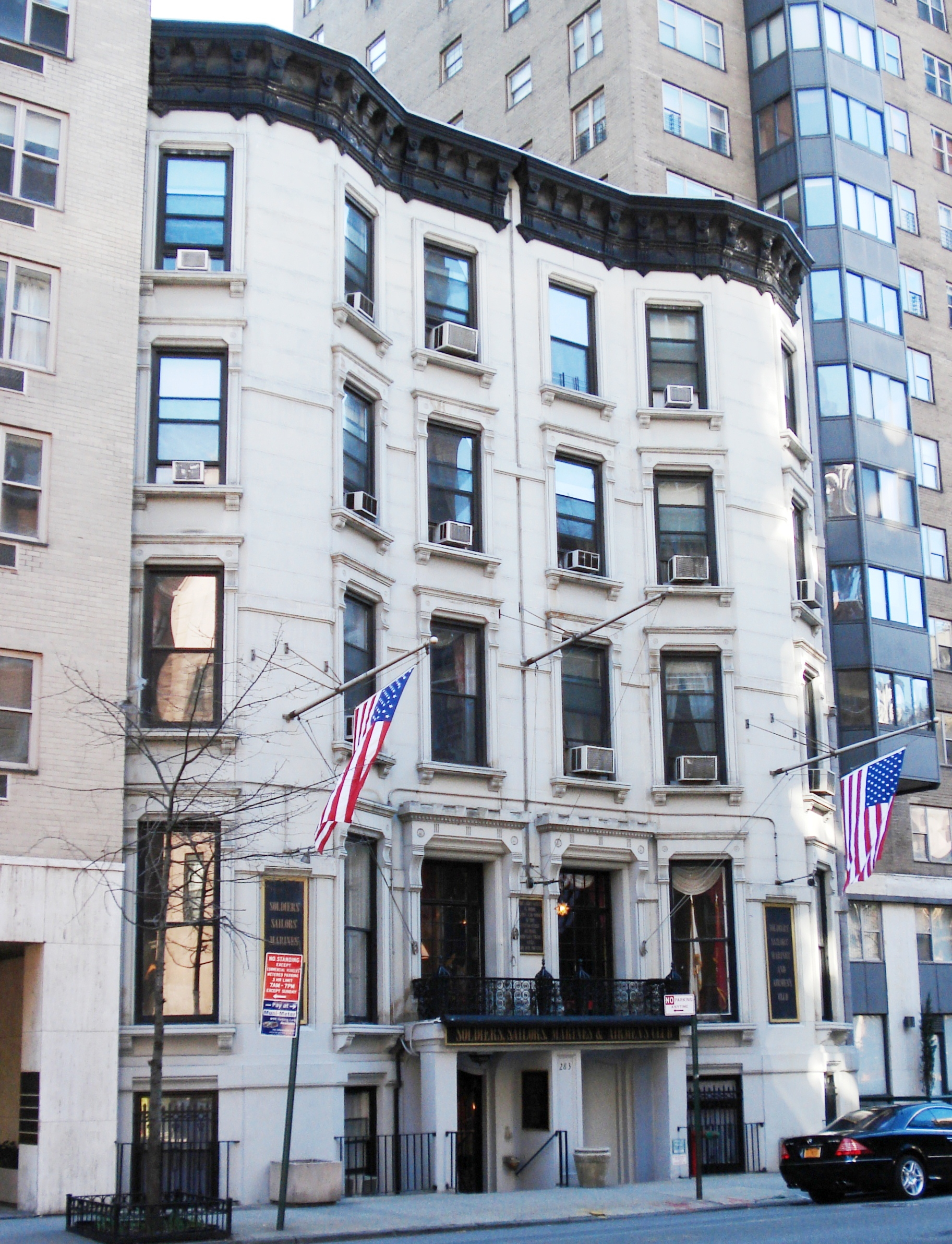
The SSMAC Club

The Soldiers', Sailors', Marines', Coast Guard and Airmen's Club was a private social club founded in 1919 and located at 283 Lexington Avenue between East 36th and 37th Streets in the Murray Hill neighborhood of Midtown Manhattan, New York City. It was the only private organization in the New York area accommodating U.S. servicemen and servicewomen at subsidized rates. It also catered to military retirees and veterans and their families.

== Mission ==
According to the club, its mission was:

"To promote the general welfare of men and women of the Armed Forces of the United States and its Allies, and their families, by maintaining and offering club and lodging rooms"

== History ==
In 1919, Cornelia Barnes Rogers and Eleanor Butler Alexander-Roosevelt, wife of Theodore Roosevelt Jr., along with General John J. Pershing, founded The Soldiers' and Sailors' Club to accommodate servicemen returning from overseas duty in World War I. The Club originally served only active duty enlisted male soldiers and sailors, but later served all ranks (officers and enlisted) and services, active and retired, of the United States and its allies. With no U.S. government funding, supported solely by guest proceeds and the donations of private citizens, it accommodated over 2.5 million men and women of the US military and their families.

Lt. Col. Serge Obolensky was the former President of the Club and he has a room named after him. His son later took on the position of CEO. Obolensky was also the president of the holding company in charge of the Sherry Netherland in 1949.

Another President and CEO was Vietnam Veteran Marine helicopter pilot, Bill McShance.

In its latter years, about 15,000 military personnel, veterans, and family members patronized the facility annually while the club tended to incur an annual deficit of around $350,000.

One of the largest fundraisers for the club was the International Debutante Ball held biannually at the Waldorf-Astoria Hotel in New York City.

The club was closed December 31, 2018. In 2025, the building was sold to the Sisters of Life for $7.5 million.

== Facility ==
Since the early 1920s, the SSMAC Club had occupied two adjacent 19th century townhouses on Lexington Avenue between 36th and 37th Streets. These were built in the 1880s as homes for the upper middle class of that period. It was a 79-bed facility that included a library with two Internet stations, two large event rooms (North Lounge, South Lounge; both on the 1st floor), a television room, and a dining room. The walls of both common areas and private rooms were replete with U.S. military memorabilia, especially relating to World War I and World War II. (Private rooms were dedicated to individual veterans, families and other donors having provided pictures, certificates, etc. A small room at the back of the 1st floor memorialized Lt. Col. (Prince) Serge Obolensky.) There were 29 rooms dedicated to guest as well as club-type facilities, including a canteen where veterans and active-duty members could meet and mingle.

== See also ==
- List of American gentlemen's clubs
- New York Military Affairs Symposium
