= Ava Alice Muriel Astor =

American heiress

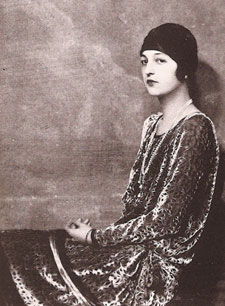
- Astor, c. 1920s
- Born: Ava Alice Muriel Astor; July 7, 1902; New York City, U.S.
- Died: July 19, 1956 (aged 54); New York City, U.S.
- Burial place: Rhinebeck Cemetery, Rhinebeck, New York, U.S.
- Spouses: Prince Sergei Platonovich Obolensky (m. 1924; div. 1932) Raimund von Hofmannsthal (m. 1933; div. 1939) Philip John Ryves Harding (m. 1940; div. 1945) David Pleydell-Bouverie (m. 1946; div. 1952)
- Children: Prince Ivan Sergeyevich Obolensky; Princess Sylvia Sergeyevna Obolensky; Romana von Hofmannsthal; Emily Sophia Harding
- Parent(s): John Jacob Astor IV; Ava Lowle Willing
- Relatives: Astor family

Ava Alice Muriel Astor (July 7, 1902 – July 19, 1956) was an American heiress, socialite, and member of the prominent Astor family.

== Early life ==
Ava Astor was born on July 7, 1902, in Manhattan, New York City. She was the only daughter of Colonel John Jacob "Jack" Astor IV, who died during the sinking of the Titanic, and his first wife, Ava Lowle Willing. She had an older brother, Vincent Astor, and a younger paternal half-brother, John Jacob Astor VI.

Her paternal grandparents were real estate businessman and race horse breeder/owner William Backhouse Astor Jr., and socialite Caroline Schermerhorn Astor. Her maternal grandparents were businessman Edward Shippen Willing and socialite Alice Caroline Barton.

After her parents divorced in 1909, Ava was placed into the custody of her mother while Vincent was placed into the custody of their father. In September 1911, Ava and her mother moved to England. They lived in a townhouse on Grosvenor Square in Mayfair, London from October to April, and at their country estate, Sutton Place in Guildford, Surrey, from May to September. She was educated at Notting Hill High School. In 1920, Ava was one of the few American heiresses presented to Queen Mary.

When she turned 21, Ava received at least $5 million from a trust fund established by her father (equivalent to $162,534,483 in 2024). Due to the immensity of her wealth and rumors that multiple noblemen were seeking her hand in marriage, Ava was called a "dollar princess."

== Personal life ==
On July 4, 1924 the engagement of Ava Astor and Prince Serge Obolensky, a recently divorced Russian aristocrat over ten years her senior, was publicly announced. This was a surprise for many, as her father had been opposed to international marriages and Ava had previously been rumored to be engaged to several different men, including Lord Dalmeny, son of the Earl of Rosebery, and the Marquis of Blandford, elder son of the Duchess of Marlborough. The pair were married in London on July 24, 1924 in three ceremonies: one was a private civil ceremony, one privately took place at Savoy Chapel, and one was a public ceremony at St. Philip's Church. The marriage was considered the event of the season in England that year.

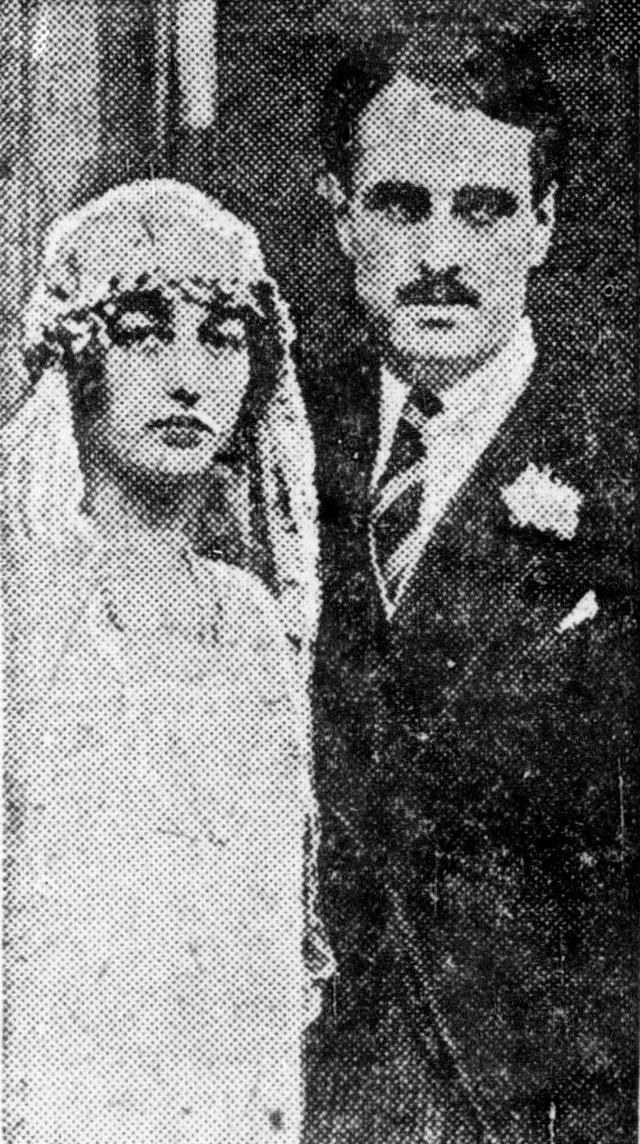
Ava and Serge pictured on the day of their wedding

The couple had two children together: Prince Ivan Sergeyevich Obolensky, born in 1925, and Princess Sylvia Sergeyevna Obolensky, born in 1931. Throughout their marriage, the pair were rumored to be unhappy. In December 1932, Ava moved to Reno, Nevada and filed for divorce.

On January 21, 1933, she remarried Raimund von Hofmannsthal, a member of the noble Hofmannsthal family and son of Hugo von Hofmannsthal and his wife, Gertrud Schlesinger. The couple was married in the city court of Newark, New Jersey. The couple had a daughter, Romana von Hofmannsthal, but Raimund was also rumored to be the father of Sylvia, her daughter from her first marriage. Ava and Raimund eventually divorced in 1939, and he later remarried Lady Elizabeth Paget.

From 1936 to 1937, she had an affair with English choreographer Sir Frederick Ashton, despite the fact that he was gay. After the affair ended, her love for him continued, though she had two subsequent marriages.

On March 27, 1940, she married Philip John Ryves Harding, a journalist, in Faversham, England. At the time of their wedding, Harding, a cousin of Maxwell Eley, was serving with an anti-aircraft battery in the British Army. Before their divorce in 1945, they had one daughter, Emily Sophia Harding, in 1941. Her fourth and final marriage took place on May 12, 1946; she married David Pleydell-Bouverie, the grandson of William Pleydell-Bouverie, 5th Earl of Radnor, in Reading, Vermont. Pleydell-Bouverie was an architect who studied at Charterhouse School in England. They divorced in 1952.

Her brother Vincent gifted her a Palladian Revival stone residence overlooking the Hudson River on his estate near Rhinebeck, New York. The house was on her brother's estate and north of his house "Ferncliff," ("Astor Courts"). Ava named it "Marienruh" and retained it throughout her life.

== Death ==
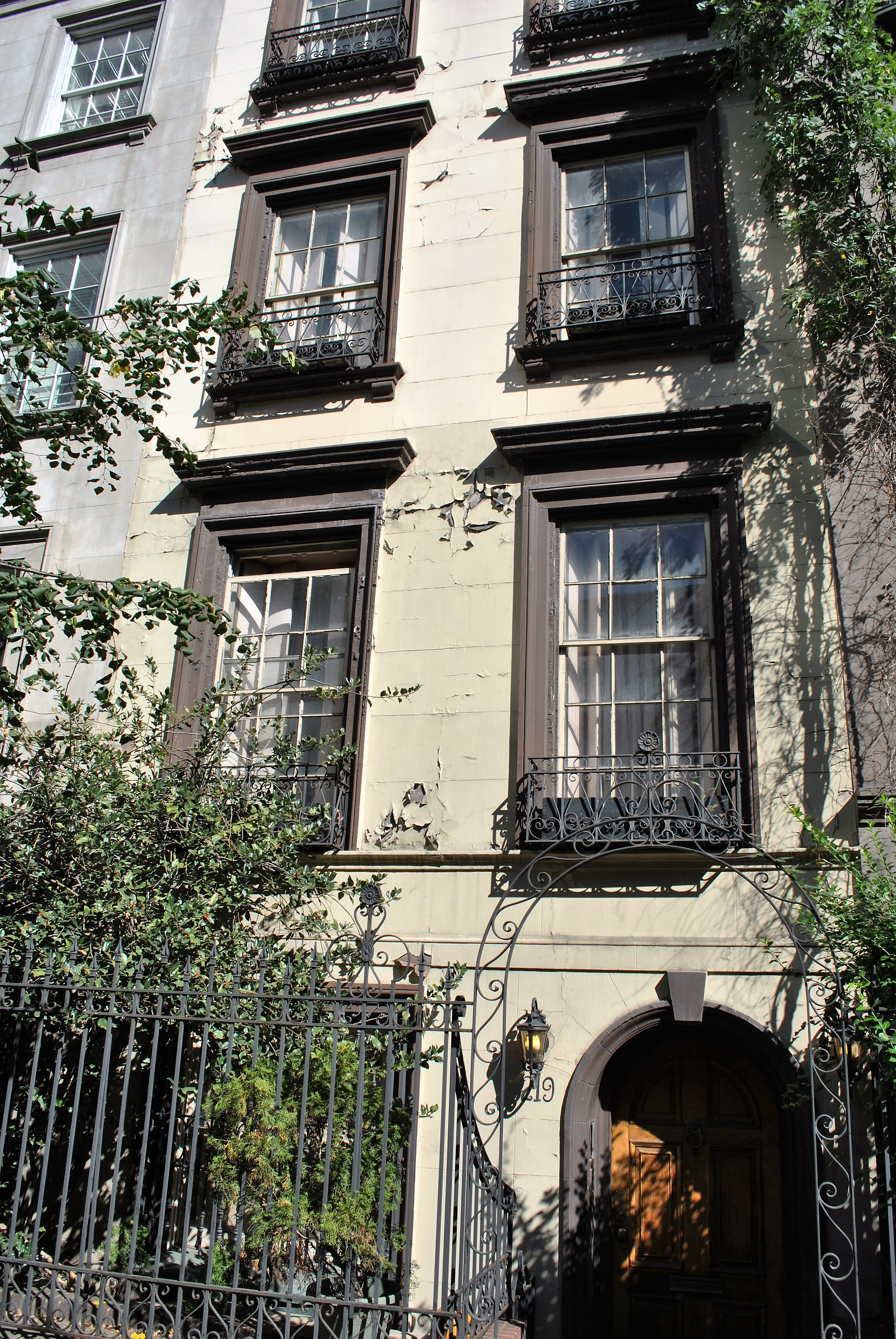
Ava Astor House 219 in East Sixty-first Street, Manhattan

Astor died of a stroke in her 219 East Sixty-first Street apartment, Manhattan, New York City, on July 19, 1956, at age 54. She predeceased her mother by two years. She was a patron of the arts, including the ballet companies of London and New York City.

Her will was admitted to probate on November 5, 1956, in Manhattan Surrogate Court. Her assets, totaling $5,305,000, (equivalent to approximately $62,822,368 in 2025) were divided among her four children. At her mother's death in 1958, her children received an additional $2,500,000 (equivalent to approximately $27,897,924 in 2025).
