= Hugo von Hofmannsthal =

Austrian novelist, librettist, poet, dramatist (1874–1929)

- Hofmannsthal in 1927
- Born: Hugo Laurenz August Hofmann von Hofmannsthal; 1 February 1874; Landstraße, Vienna, Austria-Hungary
- Died: 15 July 1929 (aged 55); Rodaun, Liesing, Austria
- Education: Akademisches Gymnasium; University of Vienna
- Occupations: Novelist; librettist; poet; dramatist; narrator; essayist
- Spouse: Gertrud Schlesinger
- Children: 3, including Raimund
- Writing career
- Language: German
- Movement: Symbolism

Hugo Laurenz August Hofmann von Hofmannsthal (German: [ˈhuːɡo fɔn ˈhoːfmanstaːl]; 1 February 1874 – 15 July 1929) was an Austrian novelist, librettist, poet, dramatist, narrator, and essayist.

== Early life ==
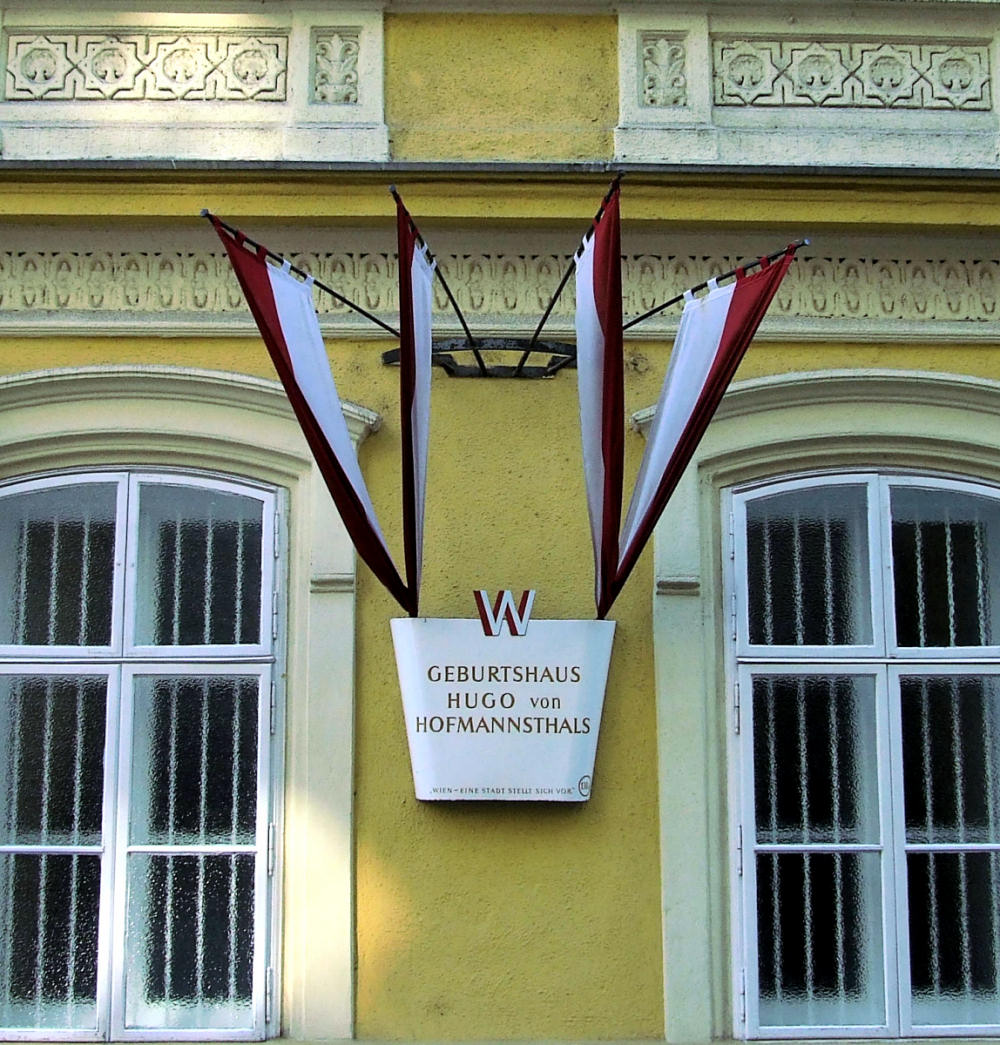
The house where Hofmannsthal was born, at Salesianergasse 12, Landstraße, Vienna 3

Hofmannsthal was born in Landstraße, Vienna, the son of an upper-class Christian Austrian mother, Anna Maria Josefa Fohleutner (1852–1904), and a Christian Austrian–Italian bank manager, Hugo August Peter Hofmann, Edler von Hofmannsthal (1841–1915).

His grandfather was Augustin Emil Hofmann von Hofmannsthal and his great-grandfather Isaak Löw Hofmann, Edler von Hofmannsthal, from whom his family inherited the noble title "Edler von Hofmannsthal", was a Jewish tobacco farmer ennobled by the Austrian emperor.

He was schooled in Vienna at Akademisches Gymnasium, where he studied the works of Ovid, later a major influence on his work. He began to write poems and plays from an early age. Some of his early works were written under pseudonyms, such as Loris Melikow and Theophil Morren, because he was not allowed to publish as a student. He met the German poet Stefan George at the age of seventeen and had several poems published in George's journal, Blätter für die Kunst. He studied law and later philology at the University of Vienna but decided to devote himself to writing upon graduating in 1901. Along with Peter Altenberg and Arthur Schnitzler, he was a member of the avant garde group Young Vienna (Jung-Wien).

== Career ==
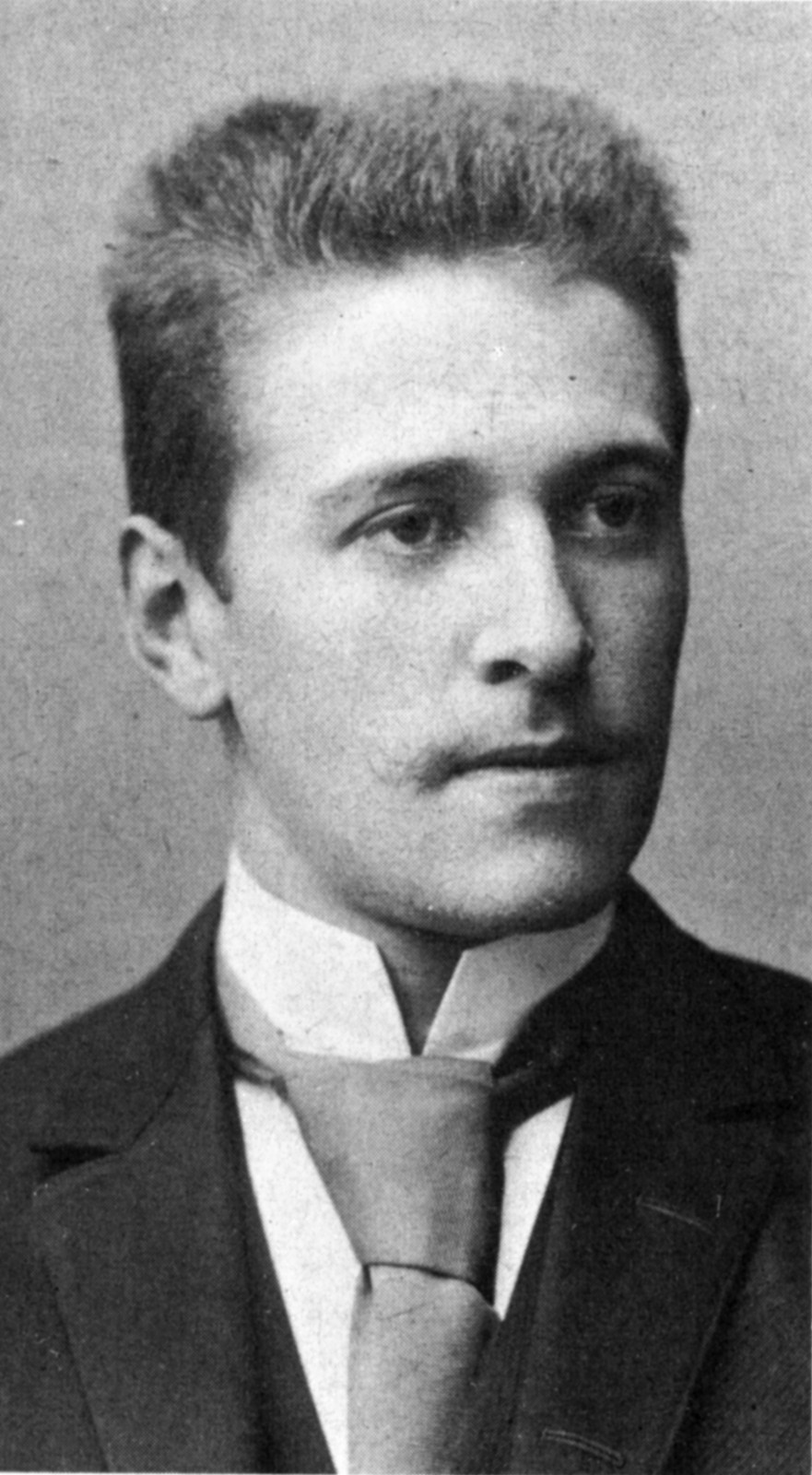
Hofmannsthal, 1893

In 1900 Hofmannsthal met the composer Richard Strauss for the first time. He later wrote libretti for several of his operas, including Elektra (1909), Der Rosenkavalier (1911), the plot of which he developed together with Harry Graf Kessler, Ariadne auf Naxos (1912, rev. 1916), Die Frau ohne Schatten (1919), Die ägyptische Helena (1928), and Arabella (1929, but first performed in 1933).

Between 1891 and 1899 Hofmannsthal wrote a number of short verse plays, influenced by the static dramas of the Belgian writer Maurice Maeterlinck, the dramatic monologues of the English Romantic poet Robert Browning, and the proverbes dramatiques of the French poet Alfred de Musset.

In 1911 he adapted the 15th century English morality play Everyman as Jedermann, and Einar Nilson wrote the music for it. The play later became a staple at the Salzburg Festival.

During World War I Hofmannsthal held a government post. He wrote speeches and articles supporting the war effort, and emphasizing the cultural tradition of Austria-Hungary. The end of the war spelled the end of the Habsburg monarchy in Austria; this was a blow from which the patriotic and conservative-minded Hofmannsthal never fully recovered.

Nevertheless, the years after the war were very productive ones for Hofmannsthal; he continued with his earlier literary projects, almost without a break. He wrote several new libretti for Richard Strauss operas. In 1920, Hofmannsthal, along with Max Reinhardt, founded the Salzburg Festival. His later plays revealed a growing interest in religious, particularly Roman Catholic, themes. Among his writings was a screenplay for a film version of Der Rosenkavalier (1925) directed by Robert Wiene.

=== Thought ===
On 18 October 1902 Hofmannsthal published a fictive letter in the Berlin daily Der Tag (The Day), titled simply "Ein Brief" ("A Letter"). It was purportedly written in 1603 by Philip, Lord Chandos, to Francis Bacon. In this letter Chandos says that he has stopped writing because he has "lost completely the ability to think or to speak of anything coherently"; he has given up on the possibility of language to describe the world. This letter reflects the growing distrust of and dissatisfaction with language that so characterizes the Modern era, and Chandos's dissolving personality is not only individual but societal.

Growing up the son of a wealthy merchant who was well connected with the major artists of the time, Hofmannsthal was raised in what Carl Schorske refers to as "the temple of art". This perfect setting for aesthetic isolation allowed Hofmannsthal the unique perspective of the privileged artist, but also allowed him to see that art had become a flattened documenting of humanity, which took our instincts and desires and framed them for viewing without acquiring any of the living, passionate elements. Because of this realization, Hofmannsthal's idea of the role of the artist began to take shape as someone who created works that would inspire or inflame the instinct, rather than merely preserving it in a creative form. He also began to think that the artist should not be someone isolated and left to his art, but rather a man of the world, immersed in both politics and art.

Hofmannsthal saw in English culture the ideal setting for the artist. This was because the English simultaneously admired Admiral Nelson, a war hero, and John Milton, a poet, while still maintaining a solid national identity. "In [Hofmannsthal's] view, the division between artist (writer) and man of action (politician, explorer, soldier) does not exist in England. Britain provides her subjects with a common base of energy which functions as equilibrium, a force lacking in fragmented Germany" (Weiss). This singular and yet pragmatic identity must have appealed to Hofmannsthal to a certain degree due to the large scale fragmentation of Austria at the time, which was witnessing the birth of radical nationalism and anti-Semitism, a nation in which the progressive artist and the progressive politician were growing more different and hostile to each other by the day.

=== Influence ===
The Austrian author Stefan Zweig wrote in his memoirs The World of Yesterday (1942) on Hofmannsthal's early accomplishments and their influence on Zweig's generation:

The appearance of the young Hofmannsthal is and remains notable as one of the greatest miracles of accomplishment early in life; in world literature, except for Keats and Rimbaud, I know no other youthful example of a similar impeccability in the mastering of language, no such breadth of spiritual buoyancy, nothing more permeated with poetic substance even in the most casual lines, than in this magnificent genius, who already in his sixteenth and seventeenth year had inscribed himself in the eternal annals of the German language with unextinguishable verses and prose which today has still not been surpassed. His sudden beginning and simultaneous completion was a phenomenon that hardly occurs more than once in a generation.

— Stefan Zweig, Die Welt von Gestern, Frankfurt am Main 1986, 63–64

== Personal life ==
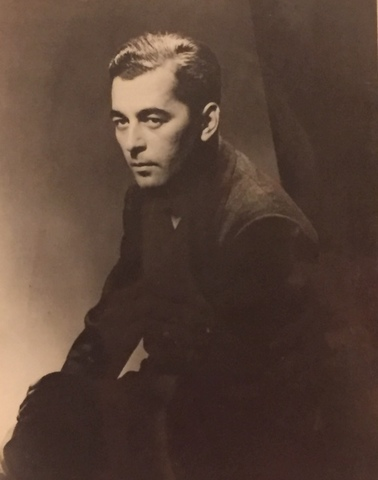
Photograph of his younger son, Raimund

In 1901 he married Gertrud "Gerty" Schlesinger, the daughter of a Viennese Jewish banker. Gerty converted to Christianity before their marriage, and they settled in Rodaun (now part of Liesing), not far from Vienna, and had three children:

- Christiane von Hofmannsthal (1902–1987), who married German indologist Heinrich Zimmer in early 1929. Zimmer taught at University of Greifswald, Heidelberg University, and Balliol College, Oxford. After they moved to New Rochelle, he became a visiting lecturer at Columbia University.
- Franz von Hofmannsthal (1903–1929), who committed suicide on 13 July 1929.
- Raimund von Hofmannsthal (1906–1974), who married Ava Alice Muriel Astor, daughter of John Jacob Astor IV and Ava Lowle Willing in 1933. After divorcing Ava in 1939, Raimund later married Lady Elizabeth Paget, daughter of the 6th Marquess of Anglesey.

Two days after his elder son Franz committed suicide, Hugo himself died of a stroke while dressing for the funeral at Rodaun. He was buried wearing the habit of a Franciscan tertiary, as he had requested. His widow, who acquired Schloss Prielau in 1932, died in London in 1959.

== Bibliography ==
Plays

- Der Tor und der Tod (1893)
- Der Tod des Tizian (1892)
- Elektra (1903)
- Ödipus und die Sphinx (1906)
- Die Frau im Fenster (1909)
- Christinas Heimreise (1910)
- Jedermann (1911)
- Der Schwierige (1921)
- Das Salzburger große Welttheater (1922)
- Der Turm (1925)

Libretti

- Elektra (1909)
- Der Rosenkavalier (1911)
- Ariadne auf Naxos (1912, rev. 1916)
- Die Frau ohne Schatten (1919)
- Die ägyptische Helena (1928)
- Arabella (1933)

Narrations and fictitious conversations

- Das Märchen der 672. Nacht (1895)
- Reitergeschichte (1899)
- Erlebnis des Marschalls von Bassompierre (1900)
- Ein Brief (Brief des Lord Chandos an Francis Bacon) (1902)
- Die Wege und die Begegnungen (1907)
- Die Briefe des Zurückgekehrten (1907–1908)
- Das fremde Mädchen (1911)
- Reise im nördlichen Afrika (1925)

Novel (fragment)

- Andreas oder Die Vereinigten (1907–1927)

Essays, speeches, prose

- Zur Physiologie der modernen Liebe (1891)
- Poesie und Leben (1896)
- Über Gedichte (1904)
- Der Dichter und diese Zeit (1907)
- Appell an die oberen Stände (1914)
- Krieg und Kultur (1915)
- Wir Österreicher und Deutschland (1915)
- Österreich im Spiegel seiner Dichtung (1916)
- Preuße und Österreicher (1917)
- Die Idee Europa (1917)
- Buch der Freunde, Aphorismen (1922)
- Früheste Prosastücke (1926)
- Wert und Ehre deutscher Sprache (1927)
- Das Schrifttum als geistiger Raum der Nation (1927)

Poetry

- Siehst du die Stadt? (1890)
- Spaziergang (1893)
- Ballade des äusseren Lebens (1894)
- Gedichte in Terzinen (1894)
- Traum von großer Magie (1896)
- Gedichte (1922)

== See also ==
- List of Austrian writers
