= Denise Benoît =

French actress and singer (1919–1973)

Denise Benoît (10 September 1919 – 29 May 1973) was a French actress and singer, active across a wide range of genres on the stage, radio and television. Other members of her family were musicians.

== Life and career ==
From a musical family, Benoît was the daughter, grand-daughter and great-grand-daughter of musicians. Her mother (Léontine Benoît-Granier, 1890-1957) was a musician and composer who won prizes at the Paris Conservatoire, while her father Henri Benoît was a notable viola player in Paris, who was a member of the Capet Quartet in the 1920s, participating in several of their recordings during that period, and professor at the École Normale de Musique de Paris. Her brother, Jean-Christophe Benoît (1925-2019) was a popular and much recorded baritone. Born Denise Marie Armande Frédérique Benoît in the 15th arrondissement of Paris, Denise spent the bulk of her career there, and died in the same city while still active.

Denise Benoît began learning the violin at the age of three from her father, later continuing with her mother. As a young woman, she began her professional life playing in Parisian theatre orchestras; while at the Théâtre Marigny a man looked into the pit and asked her whether she would not prefer to be playing on stage rather below it. Through several theatrical contacts she became the student of the actor and director Jean Meyer, spent a year at the Conservatoire and began her acting career in 1942. Her break-through came with an "unforgettable" portrayal of Natalia Stepenovna in A Marriage Proposal by Chekhov. Her first role, in Sixième étage, was as a cleaning lady, and this debut tended to type-cast her for some time as servants, concierges and domestics. On screen she became restricted to being a secretary, a domestic and a waitress, and so began to refuse this type of role.

In 1945 while a student of André Brunot at the Conservatoire d'art dramatique in Paris she took part in a televised play by Courteline; at the time she was only recognized as an actress, with her singing career yet to begin. In the 1950s, living in the Boulevard Malesherbes, Paris, already well-known on disc, she had facilities for recording at her apartment.

Léontine, Jean-Christophe and Denise appeared together on record in some of the 'Chants de France' folksong series on Ducretet-Thomson in the 1950s. The extensive series of records of folk songs from around France was the brain-child of her mother Léontine, so it was natural that the family were at the centre of these recordings.

In the 1950s she began a long association with radio broadcasting, which at the time she expressed a preference for, including ten years on the regular programme of Louis Ducreux. While taking a respite for the birth of her first child in the early 1950s, Joseph Kosma guided her in broadening her song repertoire and wrote a few for her. After this, a career in cabaret began, with appearances at L'Écluse on the Left Bank, and she sang at other venues until the birth of a daughter in 1957.

She remained active on stage, television and radio until her death in Paris, aged 53.

== Theatre ==
- 1941-1942: Les Pipeaux, music-hall show, Alhambra
- 1942: Sixième étage by Alfred Ghéri, Théâtre Hébertot (Madame Escalier)
- 1943: Le Théâtre de Monsieur Séraphin by Pierre-Jean Laspeyres, Théâtre Hébertot
- 1944: Sainte Cécile by Pierre Brasseur, Théâtre de l'Œuvre
- 1944: Une demande en mariage by Anton Tchekhov, Théâtre Pigalle
- 1945: N'importe comment ! by Noël Coward, Théâtre Pigalle (Elena Krassiloff)
- 1945: La Vie est belle by Marcel Achard, Théâtre de la Potinière
- 1946: Auprès de ma blonde by Marcel Achard, Théâtre de la Michodière
- 1952: Tartuffe by Molière, Comédie des Champs-Elysées
- 1952: Labiche et les vaudevillistes français, soirée written by Louis Ducreux, Palais des beaux-arts, Brussels
- 1956: Nouvelles têtes et bonnes manières, Trois Baudets
- 1958: La Vie parisienne by Jacques Offenbach, Théâtre du Palais-Royal (Pauline)
- 1960: Tartuffe by Molière, Comédie des Champs-Élysées
- 1960: Le Songe du critique by Jean Anouilh, Comédie des Champs-Élysées - premiere (the maid)
- 1960: Le Médecin malgré lui opera by Gounod after Molière, Festival d'Aix-en-Provence
- 1961: Les Pupitres by Raymond Devos, Théâtre Fontaine
- 1962: Le Malade imaginaire by Molière, Théâtre du Palais-Royal
- 1964: Les Escargots meurent debout by Francis Blanche, Théâtre Fontaine (Mademoiselle Goutte)
- 1966: Les Cloches de Corneville, opéra-comique by Robert Planquette, Théâtre de la Région Parisienne and tour in Île-de-France
- 1967: La Courte Paille by Jean Meyer, Théâtre de la Potinière (Gilberte) also televised
- 1968: C'est malin ! by Fulbert Janin, Théâtre des Ambassadeurs
- 1968: Brève Rencontre by Noël Coward, Théâtre Saint-Georges
- 1968: La Courte Paille by Meyer, tour in France, Belgium and Tunisia
- 1969: Tchao! by Marc-Gilbert Sauvajon, Théâtre Saint-Georges (Madame Martinay)
- 1973: Tartuffe by Molière, Théâtre des Célestins (Dorine)

== Filmography ==
- 1943: I Am with You (Je suis avec toi)) directed by Henri Decoin (Irma)
- 1944: L'aventure est au coin de la rue by Jacques Daniel-Norman (Jeanne)
- 1945: Seul dans la nuit by Christian Stengel
- 1945: La Part de l'ombre by Jean Delannoy
- 1946: La Foire aux chimères by Pierre Chenal
- 1947: Les Petites annonces matrimoniales (short) by Claude Barma (the wife)
- 1949: The Secret of Mayerling by Jean Delannoy (Anna Vetsera)
- 1951: Journal masculin (short) by Claude Barma
- 1963: L'Honorable Stanislas, agent secret by Jean-Charles Dudrumet (voice only)
- 1964: La Ronde by Roger Vadim (Yvette Guilbert)
- 1966: Le caïd de Champignol by Jean Bastia (Juliette)

== Television ==
- 1945: A play by Courteline, directed by Claude Barma
- 1960: Le Médecin malgré lui by Gounod directed by Claude Loursais (Jacqueline)
- 1960: Les Joies de la vie by Raymond Devos (variety show)
- 1962: Tartuffe (Dorine)
- 1962: Mardi gras - Soirée de têtes (variety show)
- 1963: Les Femmes savantes (Martine)
- 1964: Bayreuthiade, musical gala at Bayreuth
- 1965: Médard et Barnabé (serial) by Raymond Bailly]
- 1966: Kiri le clown (cartoon series) by Jean Image (voice only)
- 1966: Les affaires sont les affaires by Gilbert Pineau (Madame Isidore Lechat)
- 1966: Orion le tueur by Georges Folgoas
- 1968: Le Tribunal de l'impossible: Les rencontres du Trianon ou La dernière rose
- 1969: Au théâtre ce soir: La Courte Paille by Jean Meyer, Théâtre Marigny
- 1969: Les empaillés by Alberto Cavalcanti
- 1969: Café du square (series) by Louis Daquin (Berthe, newspaper seller)
- 1970: L'Oisillon du paradis by Yves Jamiaque
- 1970: Au théâtre ce soir: Jupiter by Robert Boissy, Théâtre Marigny
- 1970: Tête d'horloge by Jean-Paul Sassy
- 1970: Le Fauteuil hanté by Pierre Bureau (Mme Lalouette)
- 1971: Le Cabaret de l'histoire: Versailles, carrefour de l'histoire
- 1973: La Porteuse de pain (mini-series) by Marcel Camus
- 1973: Graine d'ortie (series after the novel by Paul Wagner) (Madame Chanule)
- 1973: La vie rêvée by Vincent Scotto

== Radio ==
- 1950-1951: Le Journal officieux, programme by Louis Ducreux
- 1951: Le Carnaval des chansons, programme by Henri Kubnick
- 1953: Contrepoisons, programme by Louis Ducreux et Frédéric Grendel
- 1953: Musée de la nouveauté, programme by Pierre Lagarde
- 1955: Ariane, chamber opera by Georges Delerue with libretto by Michel Polac (sings Chantal and Marie)
- 1961: Le Piège de Méduse, comédie lyrique by Eric Satie for the programme Mémoires d'un amnésique
- 1962: La Gazette des Français
- 1967: La Petite fonctionnaire, comédie musicale by André Messager (Madame Lebardin)
- 1970: Gosse de Riche , comédie musicale by Maurice Yvain, Henri Falk and Jacques Bousquet
- 1972: J'aime, comédie musicale by Henri Christiné, Albert Willemetz and Saint-Granier

== Awards ==
- 1959: Grand Prix du Disque de l'Académie Charles Cros, for "La Servante du château"
- 1960-1961: Grand Prix National du Disque for "Le Petit poète de Roland Bacri"
- 1967: Grand Prix du Disque for "Denise Benoît chante douze chansons à la (pour les) coq(s) avec sel et poivre"

== Discography ==
=== Opera etc ===
- 1959: La Vie parisienne by Jacques Offenbach (as Pauline), with Suzy Delair, Simone Valère, Madeleine Renaud, Pierre Bertin, Jean Desailly, Jean Parédès, Jean-Pierre Granval, Jean-Louis Barrault, Grand Orchestre Symphonique conducted by André Girard - LP 30 cm 33 t Bel Air 30 PA 7005
- 1967: La Veuve joyeuse by Franz Lehar (as Manon) with Micheline Dax, Michel Dens, Suzanne Lafaye, André Mallabrera, Jean-Christophe Benoît, Christos Grigoriou, Jacques Pruvost, Michel Roux, Orchestre de la Société des Concerts du Conservatoire conducted by Yvon Leenart - 2 LP 30 cm 33 t EMI 7243 5 74094 2 1
- 1969: Le Petit Duc by Charles Lecocq (as Diane de Château-Lansac) with Eliane Thibault, André Jobin, Claude Calès, Jean Giraudeau, Orchestre and chorus conducted by André Grassi - 2 LP 30 cm 33t Accord collection "Opérette en fête" 472 874-2
- 1969: Véronique by André Messager (as Estelle) with Mady Mesplé, Michel Dens, Andréa Guiot, Jean-Christophe Benoît, Michel Dunand, Jacques Pruvost, Anne Tallard, Orchestre de l'Association des Concerts Lamoureux conducted by Jean-Claude Hartemann - 2 LP 30 cm 33 t EMI 7243 5 74073 2 8
- 1971: La Belle Auvergnate by Jean Vaissade with Raymond Souplex, Annette Poivre, Raymond Bussières, Alain Nancey, Catherine Chazel, Mag-Avril, Jean Vaissade, musical direction Pierre Porte (Denise Benoît sings C'est moi Madame Mackintosh, Vieilles et sabots with Alain Nancey, and the ensemble Un poutou deux poutous - LP 30 cm 33 t Nativa NA28.001
- 1973: La Fille de Madame Angot by Charles Lecocq (as Amaranthe) with Mady Mesplé, Christiane Stutzmann, Charles Burles, Bernard Sinclair, Michel Roux, Orchestre du Théâtre National de l'Opéra-Comique conducted by Jean Doussard - 2 LP 30 cm 33 t EMI 7243 5 74083 2 5

=== Song ===
==== Ducretet-Thomson ====
- 1954: Jacques Prévert & Joseph Kosma: Chanson de l'oiseleur, Fable, Page d'écriture, with Hélène Boschi (piano) - (78 rpm) 790V000
- 1954: Montmartre en 1900: Rue Saint-Vincent (Rose Blanche / A. Brunt), Le Doux caboulot (Larmanjat / Francis Carco), Revenez, revenez (Anonyme), La Chanteuse et le conférencier (J. Ferny), Sous les ponts de Paris (Vincent Scotto / J. Rodor), Le Matin au Bois de Boulogne (Paul Delmet / V. Mesy), Madame Arthur (Yvette Guilbert / P. de Kock), De place en place (A. Stanislas / Lucien Boyer), Le Fiacre (Xanrof), La P’tite Lili (chanson vécue) (E. Gavel / F.L. Bénech), Ca fait peur aux oiseaux (P. Bornard / Galope d’Onquaire) - Pierre Petit (piano) - (LP) 260V012
- 1955: Joseph Kosma: La Guitare solaire (J. Kosma / J.-M. Croufer), La Robe (J. Kosma / Georges Neveux), La Petite Chèvre (J. Kosma / J.-M. Croufer), La Belle Jambe (J. Kosma / Louis Aragon), Dialogue (J. Kosma / D. Jallais), L'Art poétique (J. Kosma / Raymond Queneau) – conducted by Robert Valentino – (EP) 460V050
- 1956: Quatre chansons de Mireille et Jean Nohain: Tant pis pour la rime (Mireille / J. Nohain), Les Trois gendarmes (Mireille / J. Nohain), Et pourtant, moi je l’ai vu (Mireille / J. Nohain), Les Petits lutins (Mireille / J. Nohain) - François Rauber (piano) - (EP) 460V214
- 1957: Denise Benoît chante Minou Drouet: Ma maison de Pouliguen (M. Drouet / Pierre Duclos), La Naissance du poussin (M. Drouet / Jean Françaix), Bilou (M. Drouet / Marc Lanjean), La Mer haussait les épaules (M. Drouet / Paul Misraki), Mon cœur est un bateau léger (M. Drouet / B. Boesch) – conducted by Michel Ramos – (EP) 460V245
- 1957: Humour de la Belle Epoque: Le Verligondin (folklore), Le Fiacre (Xanrof), Je m'embrouille (Y. Guilbert / P. de Kock), L'Eloge des vieux (Y. Guilbert / Collé), Madame Arthur (Y. Guilbert / P. de Kock) - François Rauber (piano) – (EP) 460V327
- 1957: Bonjour Monsieur Trenet: La Folle Complainte (Charles Trenet), Une noix (A. Lasry / C. Trenet), Sur le fil (J. Solar / C. Trenet), Berceuse (A. Lasry / C. Trenet) - with François Rauber and his trio - (EP) 460V328
- 1958: Humour et poésie: Mozart avec nous (Boris Vian / Mozart / Alain Goraguer), Le Chat dans la nuit (Ricet Barrier / Lina Pizzuto), La Folle Complainte (C. Trenet), Les Trois Gendarmes (J. Nohain / Mireille), L’Eloge des vieux (Collé / Y. Guilbert), La Demoiselle de Montauban (R. Barrier / Bernard Lelou), La Naissance du poussin (M. Drouet/ J. Françaix), Et pourtant, moi, je l’ai vu (J. Nohain / Mireille), Berceuse (C. Trenet / A Lasry), Le Verligondin (folklore) – with François Rauber and his orchestra - (LP) 260V092
- 1958: Théodore Botrel chanté par Denise Benoît: La Paimpolaise (Th. Botrel / E. Feautrier), Le Mouchoir rouge de Cholet (Botrel), Par le petit doigt (Botrel), Le Grand Lustukru (Botrel) – with François Rauber and his orchestra – (EP) 460V381

==== Fontana ====
- 1958: Denise Benoît chante Ricet Barrier: La Dame de Ris-Orangis (R. Barrier / B. Lelou), Au jardin du Luxembourg (Barrier / F. Mainville), La Servante du château (Barrier / B. Lelou), Les Clochards (Barrier / B. Lelou) – with François Rauber and his orchestra – (EP) 460.596 ME
- 1959: Le Corps de garde (Pierre Louki / P. Lamel), Regrets d’une fille de joie (Ducreux), Le Chat de la voisine (Lagary / Ph. Gérard), Le Carrosse (Mireille / H. Contet) – with François Rauber and his orchestra – (EP) 460.625 ME
- 1959: La Servante du château (R. Barrier / B. Lelou), Le Carrosse (Mireille / H. Contet) – with François Rauber and his orchestra - (SP) 261.120 MF
- 1959: Denise Benoît et Simone Langlois - deux grands prix du disque: La Servante du château (R. Barrier / B. Lelou), Le Chat de la voisine (Lagary / Ph. Gérard) – with François Rauber and his orchestra - (EP) 460.633 ME
- 1959: Denise Benoît chante Pierre Louki: La Flanelle de grand-père (Louki / Jean Lemaire), Quand les gambettes... (Louki / Lemaire), Le Gros Pâtissier (Louki / Lemaire), Les Mots du vocabulaire (Louki / Lemaire) – with François Rauber and his orchestra – (EP) 460.637 ME
- 1960: Chansons du petit poète: Changement d'air, Problème blême, Le Petit somnanbule, Jonas, Idylle de cour, T’en souvient-il ?, Arabesque, J’ai descendu dans mon jardin (all: Roland Bacri / Jean Claudric) – conducted by Jean Claudric – (EP) 460.674 ME
- 1960: Denise Benoît chante Brel: La Dame patronnesse, Les Flamandes, L’Air de la bêtise, Tendresse' (all by Jacques Brel)' – with François Rauber and his orchestra - (EP) 460.682 ME
- 1960: Timoléon le jardinier (Roger Riffard), Madame Desnoix (M. Carré / M. Méry), L’Ane de Saint-Cidoine (Louki / Maurice Vander), Les Imbéciles (L. Chauliac & Jean-Claude Pascal / Bernard Dimey), with François Rauber and his orchestra - EP 17 cm 45 t 460.727 ME
- 1961: A Passy (A. Paté / Pierre Saka), Hurluberlu (S. Lenormand / M. Hamonou), Mozart avec nous (A. Goraguer / B. Vian / W.A. Mozart), Le Petit Tour dans les bois (with Jean-Christophe Benoît) (Marie-Josée Neuville) – with François Rauber and his orchestra - (EP) 460.766 ME

==== Adès ====
- 1963: Denise Benoît dit et chante Brassens: Saturne, Dans l'eau de la claire fontaine, La Marche nuptiale, Les Sabots d'Hélène, Le Nombril des femmes d'agents, Tonton Nestor, Oncle Archibald, Le Vent (all: Georges Brassens) - (EP) P37LA4.032
- 1967: Denise Benoît chante douze chansons à la (pour les) coq(s) avec sel et poivre: Ouvr’ la fenêtre (Mathilde Moutier / Julien Prévost), Le Joli Fusil (Bossuyt de Lylle / Gumery), Les Différences (Lafargue et Robiquet / Raphaël Beretta), Ah ! voui (Marinier / Christiné), La Canne (Léognan), Mon p’tit Wattman (Briolet / Arnoult / Lestac), A cause du bilboquet (Louis Lemarchand / Géo Koger / Maurice Hermite), La P’tite Femme nerveuse (Pierre Forgettes / Ad. Gauwin), Un vieux farceur (Henri Nadot / L. Léon), La P’tite Dame des P.T.T. (Eugène Christien / Christiné), Froufrous d’amour (Christiné / Lelièvre / Paul Lincke), La Femme torpille (P. Lafargue / R. Beretta) – conducted by Jean Lemaire - (LP) 33VS620

=== Theatre ===
- Molière:
  - 1962: Le Bourgeois gentilhomme with Jean Poiret, Michel Serrault, Jacques Fabbri, Robert Vattier, Jean Raymond, Sophie Desmarets, Arletty, Jacques Dacqmine, Louis Velle, Henri Salvador, Françoise Dorléac, Maria Mauban, Les Frères Jacques Orchestre du Collegium Musicum de Paris conducted by Roland Douatte, 2 CDs L'Encyclopédie Sonore Hachette / Auvidis H 7960 (1989)
  - 1964: Le Malade imaginaire with Michel Galabru, Marguerite Cassan, Sophie Daumier, Maria Pacôme, Les Frères Jacques, Lucien Baroux, Orchestre du Collegium Musicum de Paris conducted by Roland Douatte, 2 CD L'Encyclopédie Sonore Hachette / Auvidis H 7963 (1989)
  - 1964: Les Fourberies de Scapin with Jean Parédès, André Roussin, Geneviève Page, Jacques Dufilho, Jean Mercure, Bernard Noël, Aldo Vitale, CD L'Encyclopédie Sonore Hachette / Auvidis H 7965 (1989)
  - 1966: Le Médecin malgré lui with Les Frères Jacques, Rosy Varte, Frédérique Hébrard, Hubert Degex, Orchestre du Collegium Musicum de Paris conducted by Roland Douatte, CD L'Encyclopédie Sonore Hachette / Auvidis H 7969 (1989)
  - 1969: Les Précieuses ridicules (as Magdelon) with Jean-Pierre Leroux, François Nocher, Harry-Max, Evelyne Istria, Danièle Evenou, Jean Parédès, Orchestre conducted by Jean Lapierre - CD L'Encyclopédie Sonore / Hachette / Auvidis H 7970 (1989)
  - 1970: Le Malade imaginaire (as Toinette) with Georges Chamarat, Claudine Coster, Madeleine Clervanne, Jacques Degor, Jean-Michel Audin, Claude Piéplu, Jean-Paul Roussillon, Liliane Berton, Jocelyne Chamonin, Colette Salvetti, André Mallabrera, Rémy Corazza, Bernard Demigny (singers), Chorus of the Jeunesses musicales de France, Orchestre de chambre des Concerts de Paris conducted by Louis Martini - 4 LP Guilde Internationale du Disque SMS 2858
- Victor Hugo:
  - 1966: Ruy Blas (as Casilda) with Jean Deschamps, Michel Bouquet, Marie Versini, Jacques Dacqmine, Henri Virlojeux, Mary Marquet, Georges Lycan, Louis Raymond, 3 LP L'Encyclopérie Sonore 320E859
- Jules Renard:
  - 1967: Poil de carotte (as Annette), with Madeleine Renaud, Georges Wilson, Gérard Lartigau, LP 25 cm Adès ALB 305
- Classic theatre:
  - 1969: Aristophanes: Les oiseaux, L'assemblée des femmes, Les guêpes; Plautus: Le Carthaginois, La marmite, Amphitryon; Terence: Les Adelphes, with Jean-Paul Moulinot, Yves Furet, Jean Rochefort, Jean Parédès, Henri Virlojeux, Nathalie Nerval, Denise Benoît, Elisabeth Hardy, Yves-Marie Maurin, Alexandre Rignault, directed by Georges Hacquard - LP L'Encyclopédie Sonore 320E909
- Françoise Sagan:
  - 1969: Bonjour tristesse (fragments) / Château en Suède (act 4, extracts), with Anna Gaylor, Elisabeth Hardy, Nathalie Nerval, Jean-Louis Jemma, François Maistre, Yves-Marie Maurin - EP 17 cm 33 t L'Encyclopédie Sonore Hachette 190E979
- Jacques Prévert:
  - 1968: Poèmes: En Sortant de L'école - EP 17 cm 33 t L'Encyclopédie Sonore Hachette 190E959
- Louis Ducreux and Frédéric Grendel:
  - 1950: Le Journal Officieux: Denise Benoît, Louis Ducreux - 2 LP Radiodiffusion-Télévision Française RTF SR3 (1962)
- Raymond Devos:
  - 1961: Les Pupitres with Guy Pierrault, Denise Benoît, Léon Noël, Toly Berr, Pierre Doris, Raymond Devos, Willy Zavatta, Achille Zavatta Jr, Lydie Zavatta, Michel Roux, Bernard Dumaine, André Bagheras, Jean-Michel Tierez, Nono Zammit, Daniel Laloux, music by Georges Delerue - LP 33 cm Pathé Marconi FCLP 120
- Roland Bacri:
  - 1960: Le Petit Poète: Le Petit foetus, Les Oeufs de l'amour et du hasard: poems recited by Denise Benoît, Terre d'élection, Concert des nations: recited by Denise Benoît and Raymond Devos - LP 25 cm 33 t Fontana 660.239 MR
- Pierre Amado, Léon-Louis Gratteloup et Fernand Marzelle:
  - 1960: En France comme si vous y étiez: Le taxi (6th episode): Dawn Addams, Denise Benoît, Gérard Darrieu, Amédée, Arièle Coigney, Alain Valade, Anne Wartel, Miwako Yoshioka, music by André Popp - SP 17 cm 45t (promotional record from Sonopresse)

=== Denise Benoît sings for children ===
- Quatre chants pour le Cours Elémentaire (1): L'Ane est tombé dans le fossé (folklore de l'Ouest), Que venez-vous chercher ? (bourrée d'Auvergne), Chanson de l'Aveine (l'Ile-de-France), Michaut veillait (Noël) - LP L'Encyclopédie Sonore Hachette / Ducretet-Thomson 230E007
- Quatre chants pour le Cours Elémentaire (2): V'la l'bon vent, Ah ! dis-moi donc bergère..., Berceuse (Schubert), Les Gorets (ronde), - LP L'Encyclopédie Sonore Hachette / Ducretet-Thomson 230E008
- Quatre chants pour le Cours Préparatoire (1): Il était un avocat, Berceuse de la petite poule grise, Le Petit Roi de Sardaigne, C'était un p'tit bonhomme - LP L'Encyclopédie Sonore Hachette / Ducretet-Thomson 230E009
- Quatre chants pour le Cours Préparatoire (2): Reguingo (chanson burlesque), Berceuse (Languedoc), Le Petit Bossu (chanson naïve), Jean de Nivelle (chanson ancienne) - LP L'Encyclopédie Sonore Hachette / Ducretet-Thomson 230E012
- Quatre chants pour le Cours Moyen (1): Les Scieurs de long, Ma douce amie (complainte bretonne), Le Bouvier, Margoton va-t-à l'eau (lorrain) - LP L'Encyclopédie Sonore Hachette / Ducretet-Thomson 230E010
- Quatre chants pour le Cours Moyen (2): Vireli-virela (air à danser), Nicolas (saynète normande), La Chanson du page, Tambourin (Jean-Philippe Rameau) - LP L'Encyclopédie Sonore Hachette / Ducretet-Thomson 230E014
- Quatre chants pour le Cours Supérieur (1): La Dame de Paris, Fringue sur la rivière, Sancho Pança, Le Hans du Schnökeloch - LP L'Encyclopédie Sonore Hachette / Ducretet-Thomson 230E011
- Quatre chants pour le Cours Supérieur (2): La Bergère aux champs, Les Charpentiers du roi, Combien j'ai douce souvenance ! (Chateaubriand), Les Menteries (chanson populaire de l'Ouest) - LP L'Encyclopédie Sonore Hachette / Ducretet-Thomson 230E015
- Chants pour le Certificat d'Etudes : D'où venez-vous Perrine?, Plantons la vigne, with Odette Pigault (piano) - SP L'Encyclopédie Sonore Hachette 460E857
- Chansons pour la fête des mères: Dans la chambre claire, Si j'étais... - SP L'Encyclopédie Sonore Hachette / Ducretet-Thomson 230E820
- Des fables... Des chansons...: Introduction, La Cigale et la fourmi, Le Corbeau et le renard, Le Renard et la cigogne, Le Meunier son fils et l'âne, Le Lion et le rat, Le Rat des villes et le rat des champs, Le Petit poisson et le pêcheur, L'Ane et le petit chien, Le Chat la belette et le petit Lapin, Sur le pont d'Avignon, Le Bon Roi Dagobert, Il pleut bergère, Malborough, Dame tartine, Compère Guilleri, La Mère Michel, Savez vous planter les choux?; Jean de la Fontaine - Denise Benoît, Pierre Bertin, Pierre Maillard-Verger (piano) - LP Club National du Disque CND1009
- Des fables... Des chansons...: La Laitière et le pot au lait, Le Lièvre et la tortue, Le Chêne et le roseau, Le Coche et la mouche, Le Renard et le bouc, Le Loup et l'agneau, Le Héron, La Grenouille qui veut se faire aussi grosse que le boeuf, Le Chevalier du guet, Il était un petit navire, Biquette, Gentil coquelicot, Nous n'irons plus au bois, Monsieur de Lapalisse, J'ai du bon tabac, La Tour prends garde; Jean de la Fontaine - Denise Benoît, Pierre Bertin, Pierre Maillard-Verger (piano) - LP Club National du Disque CND1010
- Rondes et chansons de France: Il était une bergère, Cadet Rousselle, Meunier tu dors, Frère Jacques, Prom'nons-nous dans les bois, Trempe ton pain Marie, Ah ! mon beau château, Ne pleure pas Jeannette, Au clair de la lune, La Perdriole, Fais dodo Colin, A la volette, Maman les p'tits bateaux, Et moi de m'en courir, Giroflé girofla, Il court il court le furet, Quand j'étais chez mon père (Les Gorets); with Pierre Bertin, - LP Club National du Disque CND1017
- Rondes et chansons de France: Quand Biron voulut danser, Trois jeunes tambours, La Légende de Saint-Nicolas, En passant par la Lorraine, Monsieur d'Charette, Les Filles de la Rochelle, Le trente-et-un du mois d'août, Le Cygne de Montfort, Dans les prisons de Nantes, Sainte-Catherine; Denise and Jean-Christophe Benoît, Olivier Alain (piano) - LP Club National du Disque CND1018
- Oh ! les jolies rondes et chansons (2): Mon père m'a donné un étang, Il pleut bergère, Jean de la lune, Arlequin dans sa boutique, Au jardin de mon père, La Mère Michel, Le Petit Bossu, Polichinelle: with instrumental ensemble under Jean Baïtzouroff - EP Adès ALB 102
- Oh ! les jolies rondes et chansons (5): La Légende de Saint-Nicolas, Il court il court le furet, La Tour prends garde, Meunier tu dors, A la claire fontaine, Fais dodo Colas mon p'tit frère, Ainsi font font font les petites marionnettes, Il y a des roses blanches, with instrumental ensemble under Jean Baïtzouroff - EP Adès ALB 105
- Oh ! les jolies rondes et chansons (6): Mon beau sapin, Maman les p'tits bateaux, Mon père a six cents moutons, Les Rois mages, La Boulangère a des écus, Bon voyage m'sieur Dumollet, J'ai perdu le do de ma clarinette, Nuit étoilée, with instrumental ensemble under Jean Baïtzouroff - EP Adès ALB 106
- Les Jeux du jeudi: Prom'nons-nous dans les bois, Ah ! mon beau château, Le Chevalier du guet, La Tour prends garde; with Pierre Bertin and Pierre Maillard-Verger (piano) - EP Club National du Disque CND4515
- Chansons bilingues (1): Bonjour, Voyez-vous ?, Chanson rythmée, C’est Noël, Il neige, Bonne année !, Je suis…, Deux petits oiseaux, Petites souris, Jeu des animaux, Au revoir, Fais dodo, Mon poisson doré, Le Ballon, Frappe des mains, Je sais compter, Comment allez-vous ?, Nous rentrons chez nous, Les Pigeons, Minet, Les Doigts et les pouces; words and music by A. M. Mealand Naijon, conducted by Robert Lopez - LP L'Encyclopédie Sonore Hachette 160E013
- Chansons bilingues (2): C'est l'automne, J'aime la pluie, Pigeons gris, L'Ecureuil, Le Hibou, La Souris et le champignon, Le Vent d'hiver, La Poupée, Les Ballons, Le Clown, Le Kangourou, Dans la ronde, Nous allons nous promener, L'Oiseau dans les branches, Le Grillon, Les Lutins, Les Fées, Chanson de marins, Chanson de route, words and music by A. M. Mealand Naijon, conducted by Robert Lopez - LP L'Encyclopédie Sonore Hachette 160E014
- Chansons bilingues (3): Le Vent d'automne, Novembre, La Pendule, Pop corn, Le Vent du nord, Rouquin l'écureuil, L'Averse, Le Petit lapin, Les Grenouilles, Au marché, Ma maison, Chez le coiffeur, Le Cirque, Le Géant de bois, Pays lointain, words and music by A. M. Mealand Naijon, conducted by Robert Lopez - LP L'Encyclopédie Sonore Hachette 160E015
- Kiri le clown: Trotte trotte, Le Tambour qui parle, Clip clop hop, Circus parade, Le Plus beau rêve, lyrics by Jean Image, music by Fred Freed - EP Philips 437 256 BE

=== For children ===
- Bonne fête, maman !: La Poupée, La Petite fille, words by Lise Caldaguès, musical accompaniment Daniel White - EP Ducretet-Thomson 460V207
- Il était une fois...: Le Loup qui ne mangeait personne, written by Monique Bermond, music by Jean Boyer - EP L'Encyclopédie Sonore Hachette 190E882
- Chants et poésies pour les enfants de 5 à 10 ans: Le Brouillard (Maurice Carême) - EP L'Encyclopédie Sonore Hachette 190E934
- Chants et poésies pour les enfants de 10 à 14 ans: En sortant de l'école (Jacques Prévert), L'Hiver (Tristan Klingsor), La Laitière et le pot au lait (Jean de la Fontaine) - 3 EP L'Encyclopédie Sonore Hachette 190E937, 190E938 et 190E939
- Chants et récitations (2) - Enfants de 10 à 14 ans: Chaleur (L’ombre des jours) (Comtesse Anna de Noailles née Anna-Elisabeth Bibesco Bassaraba de Brancovan) - SP Fernand Nathan 805
- Les Trois Petits Cochons: read by Denise Benoît, Eric Métayer, Jean Bolo, Jean-Pierre Grandval - SP 17 cm 45 t Récréation Disques – SR 80001
- Le vilain petit canard de Hans Christian Andersen: read by Anne Vernon, Denise Benoît, Linette Lemercier, Gaëtan Jor, Jacqueline Pierre, Jacques Payet - SP Les Enfants Sages ENF 713
- Les aventures du petit roi Dagobert: read by Denise Benoît, Eric Métayer, Jean Bolo, Jean-Pierre Grandval - SP Les Enfants Sages ENF 728
- Peau d'âne de Charles Perrault: read by Simone Valère, Danielle Volle, Denise Benoît, Monique Martial - LP Le Petit Ménestrel – ALB 337
- Les petites filles modèles by Sophie Rostopchine Comtesse de Ségur read by Micheline Presle, Bernadette Lompret, Denise Benoît, Monique Martial, Sylvine Delannoy - LP Le Petit Ménestrel – ALB 381
- Le vilain petit canard de Hans Christian Andersen - SP Disneyland – LLP 340 F
- Une Aventure de Bambi et Pan-Pan - SP Disneyland – LLP 343 F
- Les musiciens de la ville de Brême de Jacob Grimm - SP Disneyland – LLP 345 F

=== Denise Benoît vocal lessons ===
- Leçon de chant (I): L'Ageasse (folklore du Poitou), Jean Ruault (piano) - 78 rpm Ducretet-Thomson Y8667
- Leçon de chant (II): En revenant de noces, Jean Ruault (piano) - 78 rpm Ducretet-Thomson Y8668
- Leçon de chant (III): L'Alouette est sur la branche (danse mimée de la région du Nord), Jean Ruault (piano) - 78 rpm Ducretet-Thomson Y8669
- Histoire de la France par les chansons, vol. 8, le règne de Louis XVI: L'Emigrante noblesse by Denise Benoît, Considérations politiques de MM. les notables de la Halle au Pain with Paul Barré and Bernard Demigny; Monique Rollin (guitar) - EP Le Chant du Monde LDY-4108
- Histoire de la France par les chansons, vol. 9, la révolution en marche: La Guillotine, with Monique Rollin (guitar) - EP 17 cm 33 t Le Chant du Monde LDY-4109
- Louis XV (deuxième partie): Nous n'irons plus au bois (Jeanne-Antoinette Poisson marquise de Pompadour), J'ai du bon tabac (Abbé de Lattaignant), La Belle Bourbonnaise (anonyme) by Denise Benoît; Françoise Petit (harpsichord) - LP L'Histoire Vivante H11
- Les Derniers Valois ou les guerres de religion: Chanson sur la mort de François II (Marie Stuart) with Jean-Pierre Cotte (lute) - LP L'Histoire Vivante H12
- Chansons de courtisanes: Dix filles dans un pré, La Belle Bourdonnaise, L'opinion de ces demoiselles - EP La Guilde Internationale du Disque SMS 629
- La Révolution Française: La Prise de la Bastille (anonyme), Il pleut bergère (Fabre d'Eglantine / Simon Simon) - LP Guilde Internationale du Disque M-2262
- La Grande Guerre (1914-1918): La Mère du combattant (Jouret / Melage), Les Infirmières (A. Gremillet dit Gervy / Pietro Codini) with Jean Lemaire (piano) - LP Guilde Internationale du Disque M 2344
- La Deuxième Guerre Mondiale (1939-1945): Tout va très bien Madame la Marquise (Paul Misraki), La Chamberlaine (Maurice Vandair / Paul Misraki), Quand tu reverras ton village (Charles Trenet), Fleur de Paris (Maurice Vandair / Henri Bourtayre); with Jean Barré, Jean Lemaire (piano), conducted by Jean Claudric - LP Guilde Internationale du Disque M 2398
- Quatre siècles de chansons françaises: Chanson sur la mort de François II (Marie Stuart), La Prise de la Bastille (anonyme), L'Opinion de ces demoiselles (Béranger / anonyme) - with Jean-Pierre Cotte (lute), Jean Lemaire (piano) - LP La Guilde Internationale du Disque SVS 2451
- Le Siècle de Louis XIV; Les Animaux malades de la peste (extraits) (la Fontaine), Chanson sur le procès de Fouquet (anonyme sur l'air de A la venue de Noël), Lettre à Coulanges en date du 15 décembre 1670 (Marquise de Sévigné) - with Françoise Petit (harpsichord) - LP Guilde Internationale du Disque SMS 2523
- Michel-Rostislav Hofmann: Voyage Au Pays Du Chant: De la chanson à l'opéra; with soloists, directed by Pierre Bertin - LP Select SC-13.007

=== Denise Benoît traditional songs ===
- Chansons d'amour et de misère (chants des provinces françaises): La Jeune boulangère (Ile de France), Korantinik et Marivonik (Bretagne), Le Chien dans la crème (Bretagne), Rossignolet console-moi (Dauphiné), La Péronelle (Dauphiné), La Fille matelot (Nivernais), L'Enlèvement dans la forêt (Nivernais), Le Bateau chargé de blé (Gascogne), Mountabo la marmito (bourrée d'Auvergne); Denise and Jean-Christophe Benoît, Louise Benoît-Granier (piano) - EP 17 cm 33 t Ducretet-Thomson LPP 8719
- A travers chants: La Belle Fille de Parthenay, La Mort de Jean Renaud, L'Occasion manquée, La Bergère et le déjeuner, La Femme du marin, Le Garçon du moulin; Denise and Jean-Christophe Benoît, orchestra conducted by Daniel White - EP 17 cm 45 t Ducretet-Thomson 460V145
- Chansons de nos provinces: Savoie: Quand j'ai ma mie, Flandres: J'ai vu le loup, Provence: Le Pichoun, Bourgogne: Les Chèvres de Bouze, Alsace: Hans du Schnokeloch, Bretagne: La Femme du marin, Savoie: Le Garçon chanteur, Flandres: Le Géant de Douai, Provence: Une cigale, Bourgogne: La Perdriole, Alsace: Quitter Strasbourg, Bretagne: Dans les prisons de Nantes, Provence: Sur la montagne; Denise and Jean-Christophe Benoît, conducted by Jean Lemaire - LP 25 cm 33 t Adès ALB 333
- Chants des grands départs: Les Houzards de la garde, Virginie les larmes aux yeux; Denise Benoît with Jean Lemaire (piano), Jean-Pierre Cotte (guitar) - LP 30 cm 33 t Guilde Internationale du Disque V-2392
- Un soir à Bethléem: Un soir que les bergers, Venez bergers, Allez tout doux mes soupirs, O Dieu quel astre nouveau, Joseph est bien marié, Saint-Joseph a fait un nid, Entre le boeuf et l'âne gris, Quoique soyez petit, Les Trois bergerettes, Les Trois rois, Rentrez dans vos chaumines, Pour ne pas languir en chemin; Denise Benoît, Monique Linval-Benoît, Jean-Christophe Benoît, Louise Benoît-Granier (piano) - EP 17 cm 33 t Ducretet-Thomson LPP 8601
- La Veillée de Noël: Un soir que les bergers, Joseph est bien marié, Saint-Joseph a fait un nid, Entre le boeuf et l'âne gris; Denise Benoît, Monique Linval-Benoît, Jean-Christophe Benoît, Louise Benoît-Granier (piano) - EP 17 cm 45 t Ducretet-Thomson 470C070
- Noël et la vie de Jésus dans la chanson populaire française: Pour ne pas languir en chemin (Noël), J'ai un petit voyage à faire (Normandie), Qui frappe à l'hôtellerie (Noël de Normandie), Le Petit Jésus est né (Noël de Normandie), La-v'ou qu'tu cours donc si vite ? (Noël de Bourgogne), Sont trois rois en campagne (Noël de Provence), La Fuite en Egypte, Saint-Joseph avec Marie (Provence), Jésus-Christ va dans le temple, Sur le rivage de la mer, Jésus-Christ s'habille en pauvre (Lyonnais), La Passion de Jésus-Christ (chanson de Pâques), Réveillez-vous amis (Bas-Limousin, chanson de quête), Chrétiens, réveillez-vous (Bas-Limousin, chanson de quête), Tous bons chrétiens (Champagne), Sur le tombeau la Madeleine (Nivernais); Jean-Christophe and Denise Benoît - LP 30 cm 33 t Club National du Disque CND38

=== Other ===
- 1943-1944: Pierre Schaeffer - La Coquille à planètes: Suite fantastique pour une voix et douze monstres: L'Idylle aux machines, with Louis Salou, Jacques Famery, Jean Toscane, Jacqueline Cartier, Jean-Claude Dranoël, Geneviève Touraine, singers - Maria Branèze, Pierre Barthélémy - 4 LP 30 cm 33 t Adès 141922
- 1961: Satie en scène...: Le Piège de Méduse (as Frisette, daughter of Méduse) with Pierre Bertin, Jean Parédès, Jean-Christophe Benoît, René Farabet, orchestra conducted by Henri Sauguet; Benoît also sings La Chanson du chat from La Conférence sur l'intelligence et la musicalité chez les animaux, by Satie - LP 30 cm 33 t Mandala MAN 5034
- 1965-1966: Omajakeno: poems, texts and songs by Raymond Queneau with Caroline Cler, Jacques Degor; Eve Griliquez, Brigitte Sabouraud, Denise Benoît, Bernard Lavalette; LP 30 cm 33 t Le Chant du Monde LDX A 6029
- 1968: Chitty Chitty Bang Bang: Grâce à vous deux, Les Bonbons à musique, Le Bleu pays, Monsieur Bamboo, Chitty chitty bang bang, Truly scrumptious, Chitty chitty bang bang, J'ai rêvé que jamais, Bath, Le Bleu pays, Les Lauriers du succès, Chu-chi fee, La Petite boîte qui chante, Truly scrumptious, Chitty chitty bang bang; French version of film soundtrack by Christian Jollet, conducted by Irwin Kostal with André Viel, Eliane Thibault, Pierre Marret, F. Lefebvre, J.C. Dallemagne, Claude Bertrand - LP United Artists 37708UAY
