= Seduction (disambiguation) =

Seduction generally is the process of enticing in sexual behavior.

Seduction may also refer to:

== Film ==
- Seduction (1973 film), a 1973 Italian film
- Seduction (1981 film), a 1981 Mexican film
- Seduction (2013 film), a 2013 Filipino film
- Seduction: The Cruel Woman, a 1985 German film

== Music ==
- Seduction (band), an American dance music group
- Seduction (The Danse Society album), 1982
- Seduction (Boney James album), 1995
- Seduction (Frank Sinatra album), 2009
- Seduction (Flex album), 2015
- Seduction, a 1980 album by James Last
- "Seduction", a song by Wiley from Chill Out Zone
- "Seduction," a song by Eminem from Recovery
- "Seduction," a song by Usher from Confessions
- "Seduction," a song by E.G. Daily from the film Summer School
- "The Seduction (Love Theme)", an instrumental track by Giorgio Moroder from the soundtrack to the film, American Gigolo

== Theatre ==
- Seduction (Holcroft play), a 1787 play by Thomas Holcroft
- Seduction (Heifner play), a play by Jack Heifner

== Other uses ==
- San Diego Seduction, a Legends Football League team
- Seduction (tort), a civil wrong in common law legal systems
- Seduction (marketing)

== See also ==
- Streethawk: A Seduction, a 2001 album by Destroyer
- "Seducción", a 2005 single by Thália
- "Seduce" (song), a 2021 single by Russ
- The Seduction (disambiguation)
