= Seducción =

Seducción may refer to:

- Seduction (1981 film) (Original title: La seducción), a 1981 Spanish drama film
- Seducción (TV series), 1986
- Seducción (Jennifer Peña album), 2004
- Seducción (Myriam Hernández album), 2011
- "Seducción" (song), a 2006 song by Thalía

== See also ==
- Seduction (disambiguation)
