= Dumaine =

Dumaine and DuMaine are surnames. Notable people with either surname include:

- Bernard Dumaine (born 1953), French artist
- Cyrille Dumaine (1897–1946), Canadian politician
- Frederic C. Dumaine Jr. (1902–1997), American business executive
- Pierre DuMaine (1931–2019), American Roman Catholic bishop

Fictional characters:

- Dumaine, a character in Shakespeare's Love's Labour's Lost

Other uses

- Dumaine Street in the French Quarter of the city of New Orleans, USA.
