= La Ronde (1950 film) =

1950 film by Max Ophüls

- French theatrical release poster
- Directed by: Max Ophüls
- Screenplay by: Jacques Natanson; Max Ophüls
- Based on: La Ronde an 1897 play by Arthur Schnitzler
- Produced by: Ralph Baum; Sacha Gordine
- Starring: Anton Walbrook; Simone Signoret; Serge Reggiani; Simone Simon; Daniel Gélin; Danielle Darrieux; Fernand Gravey; Odette Joyeux; Jean-Louis Barrault; Isa Miranda; Gérard Philipe
- Cinematography: Christian Matras
- Edited by: Léonide Azar
- Music by: Oscar Straus
- Release date: 27 September 1950
- Running time: 95 minutes
- Country: France
- Language: French
- Box office: 1,515,560 admissions (France)

La Ronde is a 1950 French anthology film directed by Max Ophüls and based on the French translation of Arthur Schnitzler's 1897 play Reigen. Set in Vienna in 1900, it shows ten amorous encounters across the social spectrum, from a street prostitute to the nobility, with each scene involving one character from the previous episode. The French term "La Ronde" [la ʁɔ̃d] can mean doing the rounds, a round of drinks, or a circular dance.

The film won the BAFTA award for Best Film and was nominated for two Academy Awards: Best Writing and Best Art Direction.

== Plot ==
The master of ceremonies opens the proceedings by telling the audience that they will see various episodes in the endless waltz of love. Prompted by the MC, a prostitute picks up a soldier, and they go to a private spot under a bridge. The soldier picks up a chambermaid at a dance hall, and they find an empty bench in the park. The chambermaid willingly succumbs to the son of her employers while his parents are away. The young man starts an affair with the young wife of an older businessman. The wife has a discussion in bed with her husband. The husband takes a young woman to a private dining room in a fancy restaurant and gets her drunk. The young woman spends time alone with a poet in his apartment. The poet has a heated discussion with an actress in her dressing room after a performance of his play, in which she is starring, about where they will spend the night. The actress is visited in her bedroom by a count who saw her perform. Although she invites him to visit her again that evening, instead he gets drunk and ends up in the bed of the prostitute, completing the circle.

== Cast ==
- Anton Walbrook as the Master of Ceremonies
- Simone Signoret as Léocadie, the Prostitute
- Serge Reggiani as Franz, the Soldier
- Simone Simon as Marie, the Chambermaid
- Daniel Gélin as Alfred, the Young Man
- Danielle Darrieux as Emma Breitkopf, the Married Woman
- Fernand Gravey as Charles Breitkopf, the Husband
- Odette Joyeux as Anna, the Young Woman
- Jean-Louis Barrault as Robert Kuhlenkampf, the Poet
- Isa Miranda as Charlotte, the Actress
- Gérard Philipe as the Count
- Jean Clarieux as the brigadier on the bench (uncredited)
- Robert Vattier as Professor Schüller, Alfred's tutor (uncredited)
- Marcel Mérovée as the young waiter at the restaurant (uncredited)
- Charles Vissières as the elderly employee at the theater (uncredited)

== Production ==
Arthur Schnitzler died in 1931. Although, at the time the film was made, his son was still abiding by his explicit wish that his play Reigen should never be performed or adapted, Ophuls was able to secure the rights to make a film adaptation in French because Schnitzler had willed the rights to the French translation of the play (titled La Ronde) to his French-language translator, who granted permission.

== Censorship ==
The New York film censors classified the film as "immoral", and therefore unacceptable for public screening. At the end of 1953, the film's producers appealed to the U.S. Supreme Court, and, in 1954, La Ronde was approved for exhibition in New York without any cuts.

== Reception ==
=== Critical response ===
On the review aggregator website Rotten Tomatoes, 95% of on 19 critics' reviews of the film are positive, with an average rating of 8.5/10.

== See also ==
- La Ronde – a 1964 film directed by Roger Vadim based on the same play
