= Alfred Capus =

French journalist and playwright

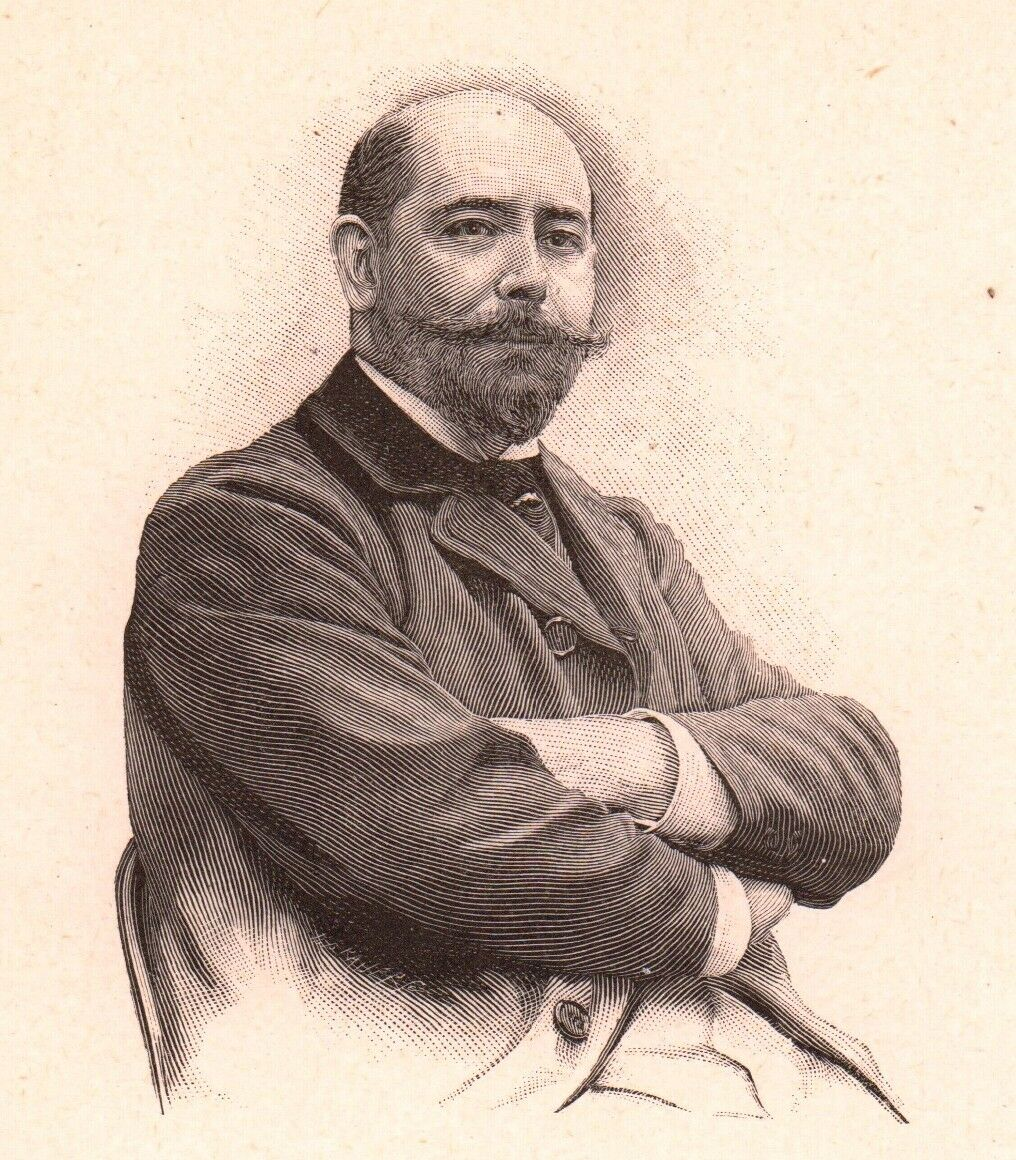

Alfred Capus (25 November 1858 – 1 November 1922) was a French journalist and playwright, who was born in Aix-en-Provence and died in Neuilly-sur-Seine.

== Biography ==
Son of a lawyer from Marseille, Alfred Capus went to university in Toulon. After failing several entrance tests for higher-education schools and working as a draughtsman for a while, he went on to become a journalist.

One of his first articles was an obituary of Darwin. He went on to write humorous pieces for papers such as Gaulois, L'Écho de Paris and L'Illustration. He also wrote for Le Figaro, under the penname of Graindorge. In 1914, he became the editor of Figaro. During the First World War he wrote stridently patriotic pieces.

On 12 February 1914, he became a member of the Académie française.

== Work and themes ==
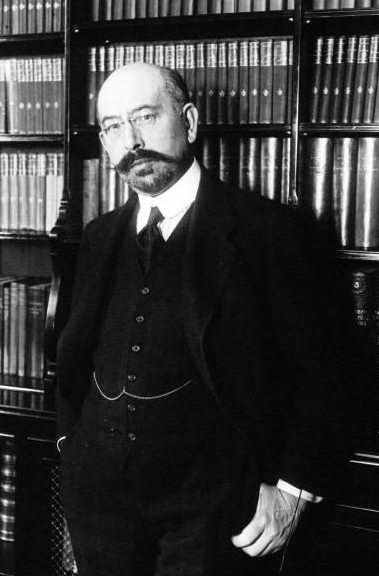
Alfred Capus in 1911

In 1878, in collaboration with L. Vonoven, he published a volume of short stories; the next year the two produced a one-act piece, Le Mari malgre lui, at the Théâtre Cluny.

His novels, Qui perd gagne (1890), Faux Depart (1891), Année des d'aventures (1895), describe the struggles of three young men at the beginning of their career. From the first of these he took his first comedy, Brignol et sa fille (Vaudeville, November 23, 1894).

The German film Leontine's Husbands, released in 1928 and starring Claire Rommer, Georg Alexander, Adele Sandrock and Truus van Aalten, was adapted from Capus' 1900 comedy Les Maris de Leontine.

== Bibliography ==
=== Plays ===
- Innocent (1896), written with Alphonse Allais
- Petites folles (1897)
- Rosine (1897)
- Mariage bourgeois (1898)
- Les Maris de Leontine (1900)
- La Bourse ou la vie (1900)
- La Veine (1901)
- La Petite Fonctionnaire (1901) (the basis of the 1921 comédie musicale La petite fonctionnaire)
- Les Deux Ecoles (1902)
- La Châtelaine (1902)
- L'Adversaire (1903), with Emmanuel Arène, which was produced in London by George Alexander as The Man of the Moment
- Notre Jeunesse (1904), the first of his plays to be performed at the Théâtre Français
- Monsieur Piegois (1905)
- L'Attentat (1906), written with Lucien Descaves

=== Novels ===
- Qui perd gagne (1890)
- Faux départ (1891)
- Robinson (1910)

Cultural offices
Preceded by Henri Poincaré	Seat 24; Académie française 1914–1922	Succeeded by Édouard Estaunié
