= The Seduction =

The Seduction may refer to:

- The Seduction (film), a 1982 thriller film written and directed by David Schmoeller
- The Seduction (album), the first full-length LP by Manchester post-punk group Ludus
- The Visit/The Seduction, a 2002 CD reissue of two records by Ludus
- The Seduction, a 2025 French television series based on Les Liaisons dangereuses

== See also ==
- A Seduction
- Seduction (disambiguation)
