= La Ronde (play) =

1897 play Arthur Schnitzler

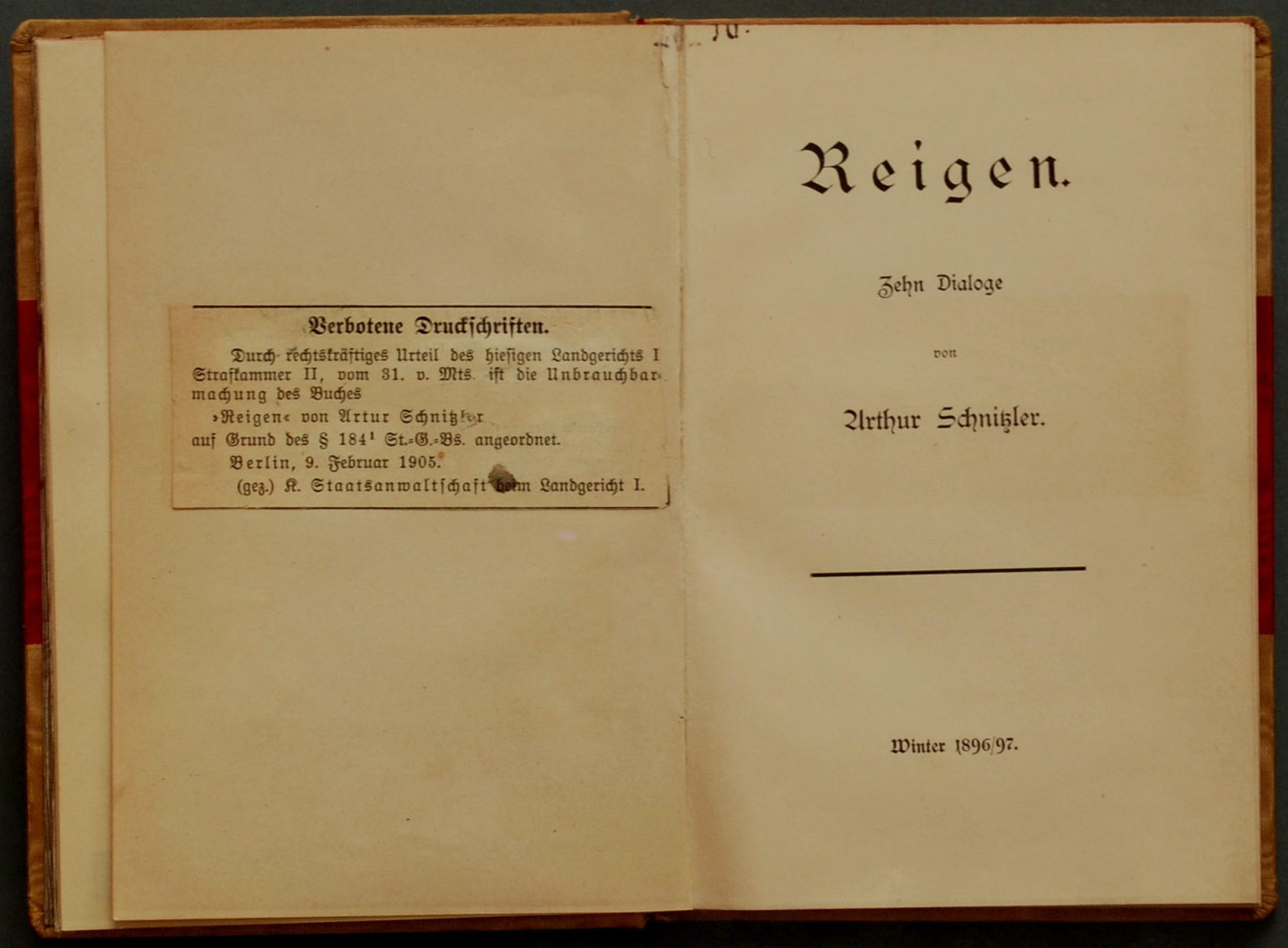
- Title page of the original 1900 private printing
- Original title: Reigen
- Original language: German
- Written by: Arthur Schnitzler
- Setting: Vienna in the 1890s

Premiere
- Date: 1920

La Ronde (also known by its original German title, Reigen) is a play in which ten people form an unwitting interpersonal circle with their secret sexual relationships. It was written by Arthur Schnitzler in 1897 and was controversial at that time. It scrutinizes the sexual morality and class ideology of its day through successive encounters between pairs of characters (before or after a sexual encounter). By choosing characters across all levels of society, the play offers social commentary on how sexual contact transgresses class boundaries. Printed privately in 1900, it was not publicly performed until 1920, when it provoked strong reactions. The play's two titles – in German Reigen and in French La Ronde – refer to a round dance, as portrayed in the English rhyme Ring a Ring o' Roses.

== Publication and reception ==
La Ronde was first printed in 1900 for private circulation amongst friends. In 1903, the first German-language edition was published in Vienna, selling some 40,000 copies, but was banned by the censors a year later. A German editor was found in 1908 to publish the play from Germany. In 1912 it was translated into French, and in 1920 into English and published as Hands Around. In 1917 an English translation written by Marya Mannes was published by Boni & Liveright, inc. A Dutch translation, by Jo van Ammers-Küller, was published in 1923 as Rondedans: tien dialogen.

Schnitzler's play was not publicly performed until 23 December 1920 in Berlin and 1 February 1921 in Vienna. (An unauthorized production was staged earlier in Budapest in 1912.) The play elicited violent critical and popular reactions. Schnitzler suffered moralistic and personal attacks that became virulently antisemitic; he was attacked as a Jewish pornographer and the outcry came to be known as the "Reigen scandal." Despite a 1921 Berlin court verdict that dismissed the charges of immorality, Schnitzler himself withdrew La Ronde from public production in German-speaking countries.

The play remained popular in Russia, Czechoslovakia and especially in France, where it was twice adapted for the cinema, in 1950 and 1964. In 1982, fifty years after Schnitzler's death, his son Heinrich Schnitzler re-released the play for German-language performances.

In 1922, Sigmund Freud wrote to Schnitzler: "You have learned through intuition – though actually as a result of sensitive introspection – everything that I have had to unearth by laborious work on other persons."

== Plot ==
The play is set in the 1890s in Vienna. Its dramatic structure consists of ten interlocking scenes between pairs of lovers. Each of its ten characters appears in two consecutive scenes (with one from the final scene, The Whore, having appeared in the first).

Scenes

1. The Whore and the Soldier
2. The Soldier and the Parlor Maid
3. The Parlor Maid and the Young Gentleman
4. The Young Gentleman and the Young Wife
5. The Young Wife and The Husband
6. The Husband and the Little Miss
7. The Little Miss and the Poet
8. The Poet and the Actress
9. The Actress and the Count
10. The Count and the Whore

== Adaptations ==
=== Theatrical adaptations ===
In 1981 the theatrical rights to Schnitzler's play fell temporarily out of copyright and several stage adaptations were crafted and performed.

In 1982 the play had its British premiere at the Royal Exchange, Manchester directed by Casper Wrede with William Hope as The Young Man, Cindy O'Callaghan as The Nursemaid and Gabrielle Drake as The Young Married Woman.

In 1989, Mihály Kornis re-located its action to communist-era Hungary, rendering the Young Gentleman and the Husband as communist politicians. Michael John LaChiusa's musical adaptation Hello Again was produced off-Broadway in 1994. David Hare's The Blue Room re-located its action to contemporary London, where it was first staged at the Donmar Warehouse in 1998. A group-written version, set on an Australian Federal election night and Sydney Mardi Gras, and presented as a part of the Sydney Festival in January 2002, 360 Positions in a One Night Stand, by Ben Ellis, Veronica Gleeson, Nick Marchand, Tommy Murphy, and Emma Vuletic, and directed by Chris Mead. There have been four notable gay versions of the story: Eric Bentley's Round 2 (1986) is set in New York in the 1970s; Jack Heifner's Seduction and Michael Kearns's pro-safe-sex piece Complications (2004) (Complications was remade as Dean Howell's film Nine Lives); and Joe DiPietro's Fucking Men (2008) (which is set in contemporary New York).

An adaptation of the play, titled The Blue Room premiered in 1998 on Broadway in New York City, starring Nicole Kidman.

Suzanne Bachner created an adaptation examining 21st-century mores, including, straight, gay, and bisexual characters entitled Circle. Circle opened its five-month off-Broadway run at The Kraine Theater on February 15, 2002, Horse Trade Theater Group presenting The John Montgomery Theatre Company production.

A musical gay version, written by Peter Scott-Presland with music by David Harrod, ran at the Rosemary Branch Theatre in London in March–April 2011.

Dood Paard, the Amsterdam-based avant-garde theater collective, presented Reigen ad lib at the Peter B. Lewis Theater of the Guggenheim Museum in New York in April 2011.

A translation, translated by Lukas Raphael, directed by Joel Cottrell and designed by Amber Dernulc set in 1953, opened at The White Bear in London in August 2011.

An adaptation by American playwright Steven Dietz, was called "American la Ronde". This version hews to the Schnitzler structure but updates the roles to more modern archetypes. It also leaves the gender of all roles at the discretion of the producing theatre. "American la Ronde" is published by Dramatists Play Service, New York. This adaptation, under its previous title 360 (round dance), was given a workshop production at the University of Texas at Austin in 2011.

Since the 1990s, the dramatic structure of the play has been utilized by longform improvisational theater ensembles. A series of two-person improvised scenes are interwoven in the same way as Schnitzler's characters are. The form was first used by Craig Cackowski in Chicago in the mid-1990s.

In February 2017, an adaptation written and directed by Max Gill was first staged at The Bunker Theatre, London. The cast featured Alexander Vlahos, Lauren Samuels, Amanda Wilkin and Leemore Marrett Jr. In Gill's new version, a gender-fluid text meant that any part could be played by any actor, regardless of gender. The roles were assigned each night in between scenes by a 'La Ronde' or Wheel of Fortune. There were over 3000 possible realisations of the play. The text is published by Oberon Books.

In 2026, an immersive silent disco-style dance theatre adaptation entitled The Circuit was produced by New York Theatre Company in Dumbo, Brooklyn. It was co-directed by Josh Zacher and John Kroft, with choreography by Zacher. The script, by Connor Wentworth, is based upon Eric Bentley's 1982 translation of La Ronde.

=== Operatic adaptation ===
Reigen, a 1993 German-language operatic adaptation by Philippe Boesmans, premiered at La Monnaie, Brussels in 1993, and subsequently recorded.

=== Television adaptations ===
In 1982, Kenneth Ives directed a TV adaptation for the BBC. The cast included Michael Gambon, Dorothy Tutin, Simon Callow, Anthony Andrews and Leslie Ash.

In his autobiography, Never Have Your Dog Stuffed: and Other Things I've Learned, Alan Alda says that for the first story he wrote for M*A*S*H (an episode titled "The Longjohn Flap"), he borrowed the structure from La Ronde. "In my version, the object that's passed from couple to couple is a pair of long johns during a cold spell in the Korean winter."

=== Cinematic adaptations ===
These films are based upon La Ronde (1897), some without crediting the play or the playwright:

- The Merry-Go-Round (Richard Oswald, 1920)
- La Ronde (Max Ophüls, 1950)
- Invitation to the Dance (Gene Kelly, 1956)
- La Ronde (Roger Vadim, 1964)
- Hot Circuit (Richard Lerner, 1971)
- Merry-Go-Round (Otto Schenk, 1973)
- New York Nights (Simon Nuchtern, 1983)
- Choose Me (Alan Rudolph, 1984)
- La ronde de l'amour (Gérard Kikoïne, 1985)*
- Chain of Desire (Temístocles López, 1992)
- Eclipse (Jeremy Podeswa, 1994)
- Karrusel (Claus Bjerre, 1998)
- Love in the Time of Money (Peter Mattei, 2002)
- Nine Lives (Dean Howell, 2004)
- Sexual Life (Ken Kwapis, 2005)
- Deseo (Antonio Zavala Kugler, 2010)
- 360 (written by Peter Morgan and directed by Fernando Meirelles, 2011)
- 30 Beats (Alexis Lloyd, 2012)
- Hello Again, based on the musical of the same name (2017)

== Sources ==
- Banham, Martin, ed. (1998). The Cambridge Guide to Theatre. Cambridge: Cambridge UP. ISBN 0-521-43437-8.
