= La petite fonctionnaire =

Comédie musicale in three acts

- Opera by André Messager
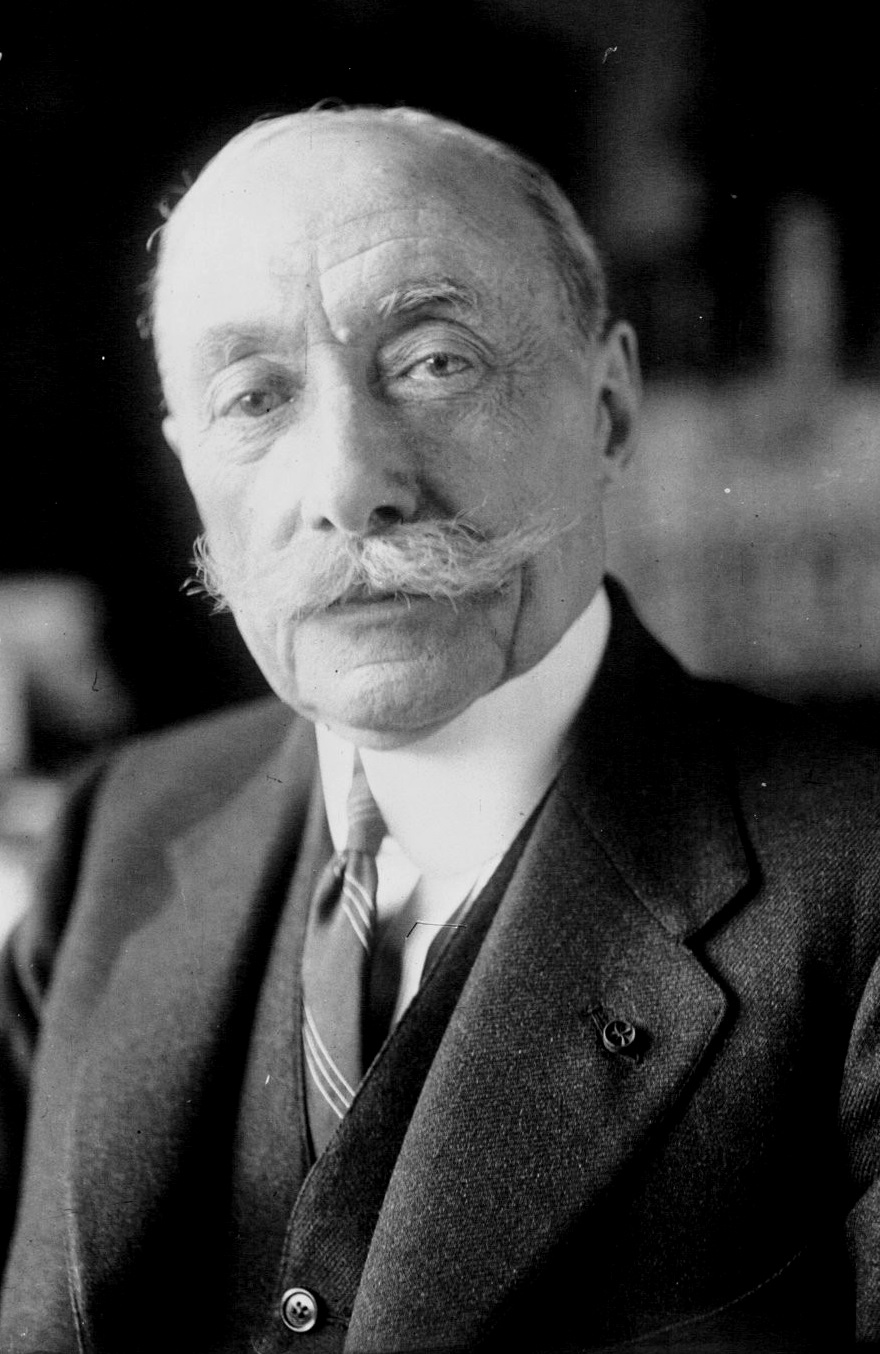
- André Messager in 1921
- Librettist: Alfred Capus; Xavier Roux
- Language: French
- Based on: Play by Capus
- Premiere: 14 May 1921; Théâtre Mogador, Paris

La petite fonctionnaire is a 1921 comédie musicale in three acts, with music by André Messager and a French libretto by Alfred Capus and Xavier Roux, based on a play by Capus.

== Background ==
The play, of the same name, was first performed at the Théâtre des Nouveautés on 25 December 1901. The comédie musicale was first performed at the Théâtre Mogador in Paris on 14 May 1921. A contemporary writer noted the charm, distinction, good humour throughout the score, with tenderness without banality, and gave particular praise for the orchestration.

The score was published by Choudens in 1921. A radio broadcast was made by the ORTF on 17 October 1967 and re-broadcast on France Musique on 7 November 2007, with Claudine Collart, Denise Benoît, Aimé Doniat and Gaston Rey among the cast.

== Roles ==
| Role | Voice type | Premiere Cast, Paris, 14 May 1921 (Conductor: Paul Letombe) |
|---|---|---|
| Suzanne | soprano | Edmée Favart |
| Riri | soprano | Yanne Exiane |
| Madame Lebardin | mezzo-soprano | Louise Marquet |
| Madame Pagenel | soprano | Rachel Launay |
| Le Vicomte | tenor | Henry Defreyn |
| Monsieur Lebardin | tenor | Louis Maurel |
| Monsieur Pagenel | baritone | Félix Barré |
| Auguste (Travesti) | | Renée Cléden |
| Invitées | | Kervan, Marguerite de Busson, Grandi |

== Synopsis ==
=== Act 1 ===
It is 1921; in Pressigny-sur-Loire, in a typical pretty French village, a dinner ends in the garden by the Loire of Monsieur and Madam Lebardin – a middle-aged couple, whose guests are the Pagenel family. The two men reminisce over student japes and the time Lebardin fell for a young blonde shop-girl called Louisette. The women talk about going to the latest exhibition in town. The local viscount, Edgard de Samblan – a 30-year-old bachelor who is rumoured to be marrying a young widow – enters, and mentions that the village post-mistress has been replaced by a young 25-year-old Parisienne.

The new post-mistress – Suzanne Borel – now arrives and asks for Madame Lebardin. She is invited in and Monsieur Lebardin is amazed to see the portrait of the Louisette he once knew – only more beautiful. Suzanne asks that a complaint against the previous post-mistress be withdrawn, and offers improvements in the postal service (a second newspaper delivery, telegrams dispatched later) in return for such a letter. While Lebardin goes to write the letter, Suzanne keeps the viscount in his place when he gets too forward. Now Lebardin returns, spruced up, with a new jacket on, and the viscount goes to get Pagenel to sign the letter. When Pagenel comes in Lebardin admits to him that although he has been faithful to his wife throughout their marriage, he has fallen in love. He asks Suzanne to accompany him as he goes out on the pretext of sending a telegram to an old friend.

=== Act 2 ===
At the Bureau de Postes Suzanne and her friend Henriette ('Riri') are at work; the viscomte and Pagenel are in the post office, the viscount to post a letter to his sister about his forthcoming marriage. Henriette, who has accompanied Suzanne to Pressigny confesses that she was happier in their previous place in the rue Lafayette in Paris, although Suzanne reminds her friend that in Paris the post office was always full of Riri's admirers.

Pagenel suggests to Lebardin that the best way of releasing him from his infatuation with Suzanne would be a weekend on the town in Paris; it is clear when Madame Lebardin enters the office that she has her suspicions about her husband's behaviour. Lebardin resolves to send Suzanne a telegram – which Suzanne then reads in disgust - while Riri, who has heard everything, says to Suzanne's horror that she would have accepted the offer of his gifts and an apartment in Paris.

The telegram boy enters and it is clear that he is having an affair with Riri. They are discovered kissing by Suzanne who accuses them of dishonouring the administration of the post. After further admonition, Riri retorts that Suzanne will also act with abandon when she falls in love.

The viscount arrives to collect his package and is greeted by a tender smile from Suzanne, until he tells her that the package is related to his forthcoming marriage. Suzanne is visibly upset by his words and admits her affection for him. Suzanne decides to leave Pressigny rather live in a dream, and when Lebardin re-enters she tells him that she has decided to let him become her protector provided he does all the things for her he had promised.

=== Act 3 ===
A week later Suzanne is in Paris, lavished upon by Lebardin as she had asked for. Lebardin arrives in town and takes her to a grand music hall. The first person they meet is Pagenel who comes to have fun every week. But Pagenel is not the only man from Pressigny there for pleasure – the viscount, only married for one week, is also around.

Suzanne admits to missing life in Pressigny, but Pagenel arrives to announce that many of the Pressigny residents are in the hall. Lebardin’s wife declares that she knows all and demands that her husband return to Pressigny. He denies that he is having a liaison with Suzanne. After they have left the hall, the viscount and Suzanne arrive in conversation, him trying to get her to be his, but she says she is no longer in love. However she changes her mind when Lebardin renounces his oath to provide for her, and agrees with the viscount to move back with him to the peaceful country.
