= Circle of Love (film) =

1964 film by Roger Vadim

- Theatrical release poster
- French: La ronde
- Directed by: Roger Vadim
- Written by: Jean Anouilh
- Based on: La Ronde; 1897 play by Arthur Schnitzler
- Produced by: Raymond Hakim; Robert Hakim
- Starring: Jane Fonda; Anna Karina; Jean-Claude Brialy; Maurice Ronet
- Cinematography: Henri Decaë
- Music by: Michel Magne
- Distributed by: Continental Distributing Inc. Walter Reader-Sterling Inc (US)
- Release date: 16 October 1964 (France)
- Running time: 110 minutes
- Country: France
- Language: French
- Box office: 1,078,415 admissions (France)

Circle of Love (French: La ronde) is a 1964 French drama film directed by Roger Vadim and based on Arthur Schnitzler's 1897 play Reigen. The film generated minor controversy because of Jane Fonda's nude scene, the first by a major American actress in a foreign film.

== Synopsis ==
In 1913, a sentimental Parisian prostitute offers herself freely to Georges, a handsome soldier, because he resembles her true love. Seeking to take advantage of all opportunities for sex, the soldier seduces Rose, a lonely housemaid, and then goes off to make other conquests.

Returning home, Rose allows her employer's son Alfred to have sex with her. Encouraged by the experience, the young gentleman next makes love to Sophie, a married woman. Refreshed by the encounter, Sophie makes bold overtures to her stuffy husband Henri. Later, Henri takes a mistress who forsakes him for an author whom she hopes will write a play for her. Instead, he pursues Maximilienne de Poussy, an established actress with whom he had had an affair years before. He has little success, however, for the actress finds satisfaction only with young men, and she has a brief affair with the count, a young officer.

Following their encounter, the count embarks on a night of wild revelry. In the morning, he is in the sentimental prostitute's apartment, who this time collects a fee for her services, and the cycle of love is complete.

== Cast ==
- Marie Dubois as La fille / Die Dirne – the prostitute
- Claude Giraud as Georges / Der Soldat – the soldier
- Anna Karina as Rose / Das Stubenmädchen – the maid
- Jean-Claude Brialy as Alfred / Der 'Junge Herr' – the young man
- Jane Fonda as Sophie / Die 'Junge Frau' – the wife
- Maurice Ronet as Henri / Der Ehemann – the husband
- Catherine Spaak as La midinette / Das 'Süße Mädel' – the midinette
- Bernard Noël (fr) as L'auteur / Der Dichter – the author
- Francine Bergé as Maximilienne de Poussy / Die Schauspielerin – the actress
- Jean Sorel as Le comte / Der Graf – the young officer
- Denise Benoît as Yvette Guilbert

== Production ==
After having recently directed the box-office hit Les liaisons dangereuses, Vadim took on another adaptation of a classic erotic text that became La ronde. As Vadim later said:

When I make a picture about relations between people, something erotic comes through; I can't help it! But sex has been an inspiration, the greatest inspiration, since art exists. I don't mean pornography. But when I do something I like to go to the end with what I express. It is very difficult in France to talk about anything but sex! Politics, the army, the police, Catholicism - in that order. There is the influence of priests in censorship; no rule forbids you to discuss the church but they will stop you somehow.

During filming, Jane Fonda began a romantic relationship with Vadim that continued for several years, and married.

Catherine Spaak later claimed that Vadim was so focused on Fonda during the making of the film that "everyone suffered."

== Reception ==
The film was released in the United States as a dubbed version that Vadim loathed; this inspired him to make his next film, The Game Is Over, in both English and French versions.

One French reviewer said that Jane Fonda had a "French accent a la Laurel et Hardy."

The Guardian praised the film's color and production values but added "there is a vulgarity about Vadim's frequent fleshy close ups which compares sadly... with Ophuls' elegant chiaroscuro. Anouilh and Vadim stick closely to Arthur Schnitzler's original but the film is obviously embroidered with imagery of Vadim's creation - a visual superfluity."

Writing in The Observer, Kenneth Tynan called the film "a masterpiece of colour photography" and "the nearest approach to an organised work of art that M. Vadim has yet directed."

The movie was advertised in New York with an eight-story billboard in Times Square that displayed a nude Fonda. She subsequently sued the producers for $3 million. Fonda said:

"To me it was a great big opportunity to do a beautiful comedy and my first costume picture," recalled Fonda. "They ruined it here [in the US]. That awful dubbed English. And that big poster of me, nude! Vadim resented it too."

New York Times reviewer Eugene Archer called the film "a total debacle... a dull, pointless, ineptly acted vulgarization of a distinguished play, with nothing to recommend it beyond some attractive color photography."

== Awards ==
The film was nominated for the Golden Globe Award for Best Foreign Language Film.

== Censorship ==
In 1967, Vadim and five of the film's stars were charged with obscenity in Italy for the film's content.

== See also ==
- La Ronde (1950 film) (The Round-Dance), a film directed by Max Ophüls, based on the same play
- Merry-Go-Round, a 1973 film directed by Otto Schenk, also based on the play
