= Le Piège de Méduse =

Play with incidental music and text by Erik Satie

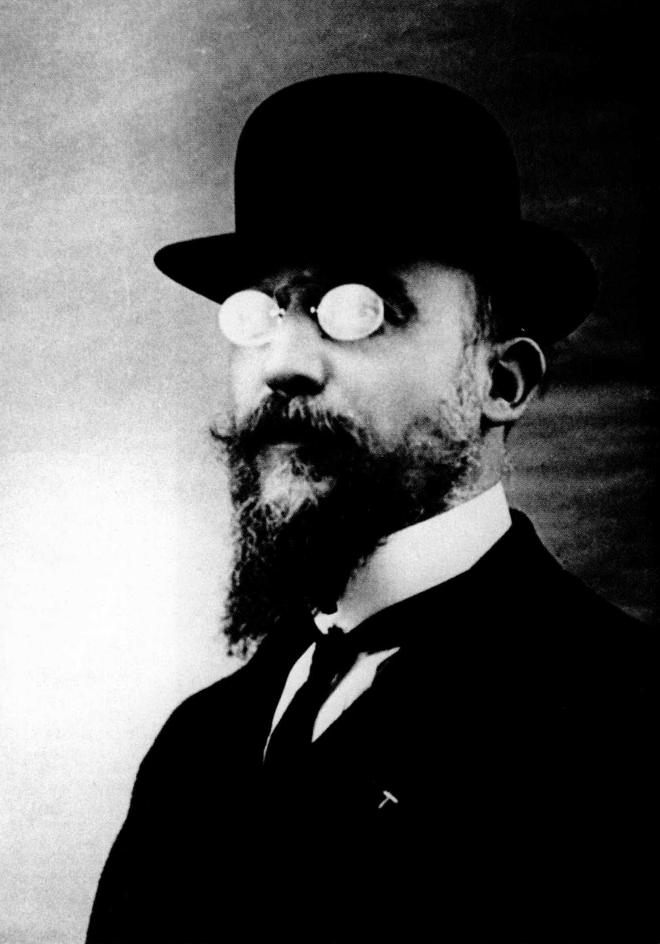
Erik Satie

Le Piège de Méduse ("The Ruse of Medusa") is a short play of which Erik Satie wrote both the text and the incidental music.

The text of the play was written as a comédie lyrique in one act, February–March 1913. In June of the same year Satie added the music, a set of seven little dances, originally composed for piano.

The first printed edition of the text of the play in 1921 contained 3 cubist woodcut engravings by Georges Braque. The piano version of the music was first published in 1929, a few years after the composer's death. The orchestral score was not published until 40 years later.

== The play ==
The comically surrealist plot involves the elderly (and very confused) Baron Méduse (his name means Medusa in French), his daughter Frisette (to whom the Baron actually refers as his fille de lait, which would imply that the Baron was Frisette's wet-nurse), Frisette's young suitor Astolpho, and the Baron's recalcitrant valet Polycarpe. There is also a mechanical monkey, named Jonas, dancing to the intermittent music.

The nine scenes of the play develop as a funny succession of non sequiturs and misunderstandings, ending in an amicable hug of the protagonists.

The play was privately staged a few months after its completion, in the salons of the parents of Roland-Manuel, who played Baron Méduse's role. Later live performances of the play would become rare, although a notable one, in an English translation by M. C. Richards, took place in the summer of 1948 at Black Mountain College in North Carolina: John Cage suggested the project and played the music; Buckminster Fuller played the role of the Baron Medusa; Merce Cunningham danced the part of the mechanical monkey; Willem de Kooning designed the set and Elaine de Kooning played Frisette; and the play was directed by Arthur Penn. In 2005, a production using this English translation was presented in Asheville, North Carolina, in a collaboration between the Black Mountain College Museum and Arts Center and North Carolina Stage Company.

A German-language adaption by Berlin State Opera artistic director Jürgen Flimm premiered on the workshop stage of the Schiller Theater in Berlin in 2011 under the title "Wissen Sie, wie man Töne reinigt? Satiesfactionen."

Several recordings, generally in French and including the music, were published. English translations are available in print.

Several 20th-century recordings of the play feature Pierre Bertin in Méduse's role. When this actor rehearsed the 1921 first public performance of the play, Satie was upset, as he disapproved of Bertin's rendering of the play's main character with Satie's mannerisms and voice (Orledge 1995, p124).

== The music ==
The musical score is a series of very short dances in popular modes (quadrille, waltz, mazurka, polka, etc.), written in Satie's most humorously straight-faced manner, and reminiscent of some of Satie's other works – the waltz, for example, is a slightly more "mechanical" version of the music reappearing a year later in his Trois Valses distinguées du précieux dégoûté.

At the private premiere of the Piège, Satie, performing the music, had slid sheets of paper between the strings of the piano for a more mechanical sound. This was supposedly the first appearance of a prepared piano in the history of music.

At the 1921 public premiere, Darius Milhaud conducted an orchestra composed of a small string section, some wind instruments and percussion, performing Satie's orchestral version of the music. Satie never had an easy relation towards orchestral music (at least according to his contemporaries), consequently also this orchestration was criticised for showing Satie's limitations in this medium. Satie, however, had probably the limited sound of mechanical music in mind for the seven toutes petites dances of the Piège.

== The surrealism ==
Satie wrote his absurdist play some 15 years after Jarry's first Ubu play had been premiered in Paris. Ubu Roi was later to become the most cherished and first example of surrealism in theatre (which would develop into the Theatre of the Absurd).

Apart from the Piège, Satie had contributed to that emergence of absurdist theatre by publishing a text regarding his theatrical vision as one of his Mémoires d'un amnésique in January 1913, in the Revue musicale SIM. The article was entitled Choses de théâtre.
