= Michel-Rostislav Hofmann =

Michel-Rostislav Hofmann (28 August 1915 – 19 March 1975 in Paris) was a Franco-Russian writer, musicologist and translator.

A translator of Russian into French, notably from Alexander Pushkin, Ivan Turgenev and Leo Tolstoy. He was also a musicologist and connoisseur of Russian music.

His name is often distorted in bibliographic sources : « M. et R. Hofman », « Borislav Hoffman » etc.

== Works ==
- 1946: Un siècle d'opéra russe : de Glinka à Stravinsky.
- 1953: Petite histoire de la musique russe.
- 1953: Serge Lifar et son ballet.
- 1957: La Musique en Russie : des origines à nos jours.
- 1958: Rimski-Korsakov : sa vie, son œuvre.
- 1959: Histoire de la musique des origines à nos jours
- 1959: Tchaïkovski, Éditions du Seuil (Solfèges series, No. 11)
- 1962: Sur le sentier de la musique.
- 1963: Dimitri Chostakovitch, l'homme et son œuvre.
- 1964: Serge Prokofiev, l'homme et son œuvre.
- 1964: La Vie de Moussorgski
- 1965: La Vie de Schubert
- 1965: Les Grandes Figures slaves de Russie.
- 1965: La Vie des grands musiciens russes.
- 1966: Musique mon amie.
- 1967: Les Grands romanciers russes.
- 1968: Histoire de la musique russe: des origines à nos jours (Éditions Buchet/Chastel)
- 1973: Petite histoire de la musique russe : des origines à Stravinsky,
