= Pierre Maillard-Verger =

French classical pianist and composer (1910–1968)

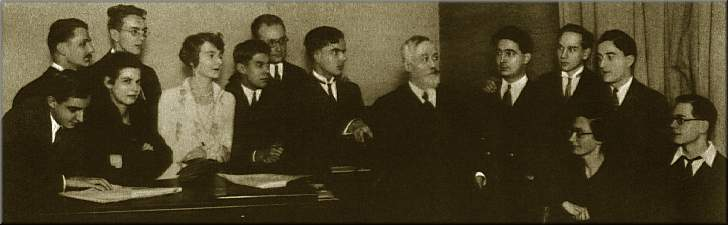
Paul Dukas' class. Pierre Maillard-Verger is in the first row on the left

Pierre Maillard-Verger (5 December 1910 – 30 April 1968) was a French classical pianist and composer.

Born in Paris, Maillard-Verger was a student in Paul Dukas's composition class at the Conservatoire de Paris. In 1939, he won the 1st Grand Prix de Rome for composition with his cantata La farce du Mari fondu.

Maillard-Verger died at the Hôtel-Dieu de Paris in 1968.

== Works ==
- 1939: Cantate du prix de Rome: La farce du Mari fondu
- Music accompanying the reading by Jean Deschamps of La Chanson de Roland (trio of baritones and lute), and that of Antigone by Sophocles
- Caprice, Etude en quartes, Petite Suite (7 easy pieces: Rêverie, Jeux, Polka, Echo, Valse, Plainte, Tarentelle) for piano
- Christmas for choir
- Film scores

== Discography as interpreter ==
- Mélodies by Fauré, with Camille Maurane
- Mélodies by Fauré, with Pierre Mollet
- Mélodies by Mozart, Schumann, Moussorgski, with Estel Sussman
- Works of the Renaissance with the vocal sextet of France
- Pieces by Beethoven, Mozart, Rameau as pianist
