= Seduction (Frank Sinatra album) =

Frank Sinatra compilation album

Seduction: Sinatra Sings of Love is an album released in February 2009, featuring love songs by Frank Sinatra, from his own recording company, Reprise. It was rated 3.5 stars by AllMusic.

== Track listing ==
1. "Prisoner of Love" (3:54)
2. "I've Got You Under My Skin" (3:32)
3. "My Funny Valentine" (2:31)
4. "Witchcraft" (2:37)
5. "All the Way" (3:32)
6. "It Had to be You" (3:53)
7. "Young at Heart" (2:56)
8. "Love Is a Many-Splendored Thing" (3:54)
9. "Some Enchanted Evening" (3:27)
10. "How Little It Matters" (2:23)
11. "I Get a Kick Out of You" (3:13)
12. "The Second Time Around" (3:09)
13. "At Long Last Love" (2:41)
14. "I Concentrate on You" (2:39)
15. "Then Suddenly Love" (2:23)
16. "They Can't Take That Away from Me" (2:42)
17. "A Fine Romance" (2:13)
18. "More" (3:04)
19. "This Happy Madness" (3:02)
20. "Teach Me Tonight" (3:48)
21. "All the Way Home" (3:55)
22. "That's All" (3:23)

== Re-recordings ==
Several of the songs on this album were re-recorded by Sinatra from his Capitol Records recordings:

- "They Can't Take That Away from Me"
- "I Get a Kick out of You"
- "Young at Heart"
- "All the Way"
- "I've Got You Under My Skin"
