= Seduction (Heifner play) =

Seduction is a 2004 one-act play by Jack Heifner. It is an all-male, gay adaptation of the 1897 play La Ronde (or Reigen) by Arthur Schnitzler.

== Structure ==
The encounters closely follow those of Schnitzler's play, albeit with some changes to the characters' archetypes. The encounters are as follows:

1. The Sex Worker and the Sailor
2. The Sailor and the Gardner (the Parlor Maid, originally the third partner in La Ronde, has her day off)
3. The Gardner and the Young Gentleman
4. The Young Gentleman and the Professor
5. The Professor and His Partner
6. The Partner and the Dim-Witted Teen
7. The Dim-Witted Teen and the Playwright
8. The Playwright and the Actor
9. The Actor and the Movie Producer
10. The Movie Producer and the Sex Worker

== Production history ==
Seduction had its world premiere in San Francisco at the New Conservatory Theatre on January 31, 2004, directed by Christopher Jenkins. The play had its European premiere that same year, with Tim McArthur directing the production. It opened at the Baron's Court Theatre in London on November 9, 2004.

It was revived in London in 2011 by Above The Stag Theatre, with Peter Bull directing and Lee Proud choreographing.
