= Seduction (marketing) =

Marketing strategy

Seduction within marketing is seen as the relationship between the marketer and the customer that converts an initial resistance into compliance and willingness. The marketer seduces the consumer to change from one set of social agreements into another, often opposite, set of social agreements leading to satisfaction of at least one of the pair. Information is given, so as to have a desirable and predictable impact on a consumer's decision process. Seduction differs from enlightenment, in that with enlightenment the information is given in order to allow the consumer to enable better decision making. The terms of the exchange are unambiguous.

There is debate as to how common seduction is used within marketing, with utility theory denying it would exist at all. Others believe in a sovereign customer, who is free to make their own decisions without being influenced by an outside agent. Seduction can be split into two separate forms, confidence games (con-game) and play depending on the nature of the relationship developed between marketer and customer. In a confidence game, the unsustainable nature of the exchange is hidden from the consumer because their rewards of the exchange will not be what the consumer is expecting or desiring. The seducer defrauds the consumer by first gaining their confidence and exploiting certain characteristics. With play, the unsustainability of the exchange is not hidden from the consumer, the consumer plays along simply for the reward of playing, for instance an older child may still play along with believing in Santa Claus for the rewards. Within marketing, playing along with the seducer is seen as fundamental to the seduction of the consumer, with the consumer playing a role in the exchange. This is what makes seduction different from fraud, where the relationship is coercive in nature and the consumer has not shown any complicity.

== Typology of ways to induce consumers to transact ==
Deighton and Grayson created a flowchart which asked five questions to determine the type of transaction.

1. "Are the terms of the transaction unambiguous?" If unambiguous and coercive, this leads the transaction to be either "theft by force" or "theft by stealth". If unambiguous, yet fair, then that is "trade with mutual gain". If the terms are ambiguous, question 2 applies.
2. "Does the consumer enter a new social consensus?" If not, then this transaction is known as "persuasion". If the consumer does, then this leads to question 3. Transactions applying to question 2 on-wards are considered to be forms of marketing.
3. "How broad-based is the new consensus?" If wide, the transaction is "socialization". If narrow, then question 4 applies.
4. "Does the consumer collaborate in building the consensus?" If the consumer does not collaborate and gains are lost if the consensus fails, then this is known as "fraud". If the consumer does not collaborate and the gains are sustained if the consensus fails, then that is "entertainment". If the consumer does collaborate then this leads to question 5.
5. "Are gains lost if the consensus fails?" If yes, then this is a "con game", if no, this is known as "play". Both con games and play are considered forms of seduction. Therefore, as long as the other questions are followed with the appropriate answer, it does not matter whether the gains are lost or not if the consensus fails as to whether the transaction is considered seduction.
