= Charles Delevingne =

English property developer (born 1949)

- Born: Charles Hamar Delevingne; 25 June 1949 (age 77); London, Middlesex, England, UK
- Education: Embley Park School
- Occupation: Property developer
- Spouse: Pandora Anne Stevens (m. 1983)
- Children: 4, including Poppy and Cara
- Parents: Edward Dudley Delevingne (1906 - 1974) (father); Angela Delevingne, daughter of Hamar Greenwood, 1st Viscount Greenwood (mother)
- Relatives: Doris Delevingne (aunt)
- Family: Delevingne

Charles Hamar Delevingne (born 25 June 1949) is an English property developer. He is the father of the models Poppy Delevingne and Cara Delevingne.

== Early life ==
Charles Delevingne was born on 25 June 1949, in Wandsworth, London, to Edward Dudley Delevingne, a stockbroker and ex-husband of Countess Felicia Gizycki. His paternal aunt was the courtesan Doris Delevingne, who was the first wife of Valentine, Viscount Castlerosse.

His father's family has been described as being of ‘lowly origins and place’ by Doris's biographer: his paternal grandfather owned a haberdashery shop which also sold French goods. Doris Delevingne lied that she was descended from a noble Flemish family.

His mother was socialite Angela Margo Hamar Greenwood, who was the daughter of Hamar Greenwood, 1st Viscount Greenwood, and Margery Spencer.

He was educated at Embley Park School. He was described as a "deb's delight" in his youth.

== Career ==
Delevingne is a property developer in Brompton Cross and South Kensington. He is the chairman of the Property Investment Company.

== Marriage and issue ==
Delevingne is married to Pandora Anne Stevens, who is the daughter of publisher Sir Jocelyn Edward Greville Stevens and his wife Jane Armyne Sheffield, who was a grandchild of the Sheffield baronets. Pandora was a personal shopper at Selfridges and friend of Sarah Ferguson. Pandora was a heroin addict who also used crystal meth and crack cocaine and had bipolar disorder.

They have three daughters, Chloe, Poppy and Cara. He also has an elder son, Alexander, from a previous relationship.
