= Delevingne =

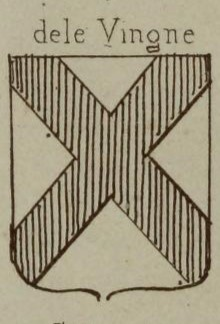
Coat of arms of dele Vingne from Armorial de Tournai et du Tournaisis

Delevingne is a surname of Old French origin. De le vigne was the surname of an 11th-century noble family from Tournai, Belgium, where they possessed the right of minting by the year 1156.

The courtesan Doris Delevingne, whose father Edward Charles Delevingne owned a haberdashery shop which also sold French goods, lied that she was descended from the noble Flemish family: but in reality she had ‘lowly origins and place’. She was the grand-aunt of models Poppy Delevingne and Cara Delevingne.

== Coat of arms ==
The coat of arms of the Belgian family features a silver shield with a red diagonal cross. Above the shield is a crowned helmet, and the crest on top is a pair of silver wings.

"ARMES: D'argent au sautoir de gueules. Heaume couronné. Cimier: un vol d'argent." - p.272. Annuaire de la noblesse de Belgique, Volume 22

== Notable people ==
Notable people with the surname include:

- Sir Malcolm Delevingne (1868–1950), British civil servant
- Doris Castlerosse (née Delevingne) (1900–1942), British courtesan
- Angela Delevingne (later Greenwood) (1912–2014), British aristocrat and socialite
- Lionel Delevingne, French-American photojournalist
- Charles Delevingne (born 1949), British property developer, father of models Cara and Poppy
- Poppy Delevingne (born 1986), British model and actress
- Cara Delevingne (born 1992), British model, actress, and musician

== See also ==
- de le Vingne
- Delavigne
- Lavine
