= James Alexander Gordon (disambiguation) =

James Alexander Gordon may refer to:

- James Alexander Gordon (1936–2014), Scottish radio broadcaster
- James Alexander Gordon (physician) (1793–1872), English physician
- Sir James Alexander Gordon (1782–1869), British Royal Navy officer
