= Poppy Delevingne =

English model (born 1986)

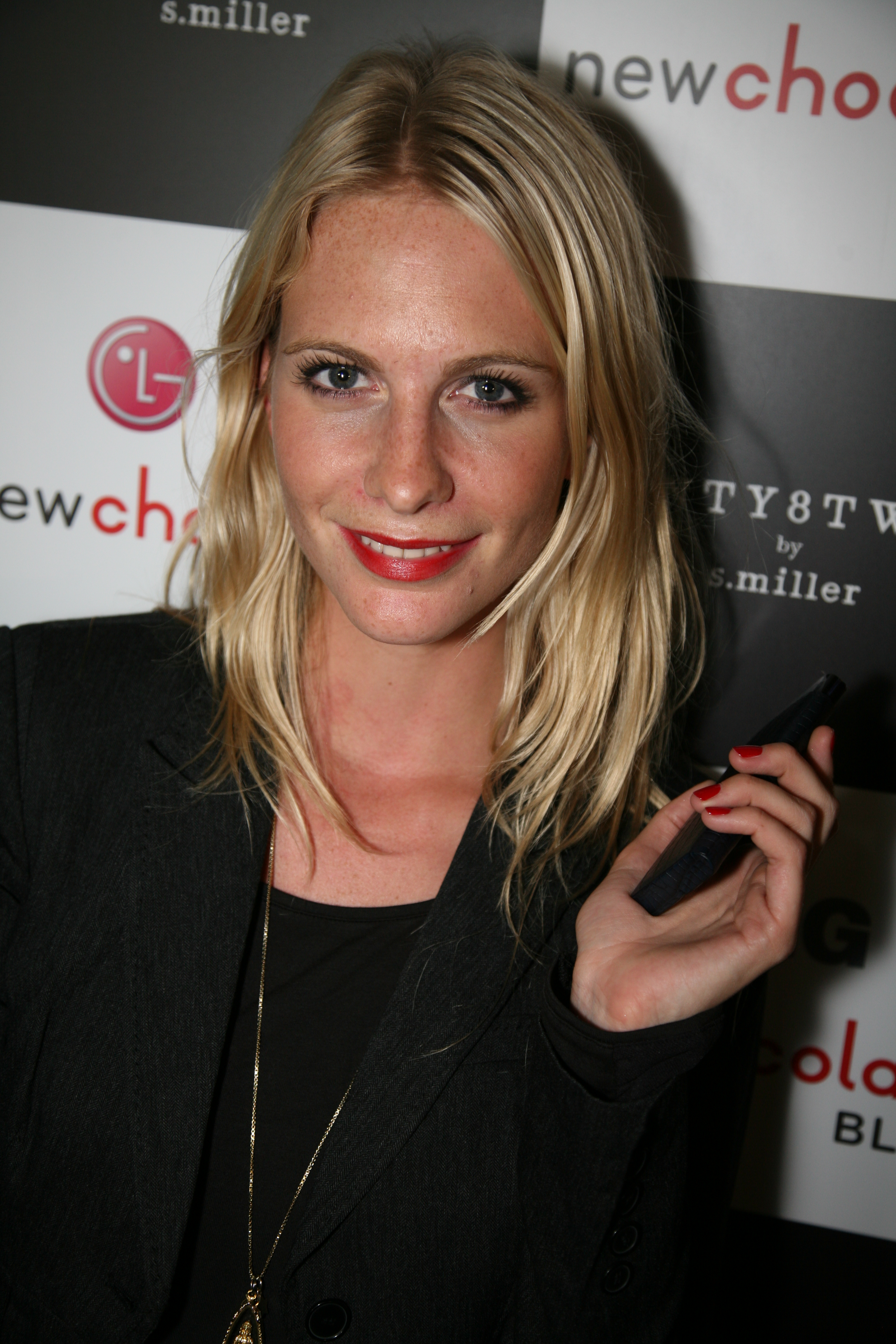
- Delevingne in 2009
- Born: Poppy Angela Delevingne; 3 May 1986 (age 40); London, England
- Other name: Poppy Cook
- Occupations: Socialite; model; actress
- Years active: 2004–present
- Spouse: James Cook (m. 2014; sep. 2022)
- Children: 1
- Parent: Charles Delevingne (father)
- Relatives: Cara Delevingne (sister); Jocelyn Stevens (maternal grandfather)
- Family: Delevingne
- Modelling information
- Height: 5 ft 10 in (1.78 m)
- Hair colour: Blonde
- Eye colour: Blue
- Agency: IMG Models (New York, Paris, Milan, London)

Poppy Angela Delevingne (born 3 May 1986) is an English socialite, actress and model.

== Early and personal life ==
Delevingne was born on 3 May 1986, in London, one of three daughters of property developer Charles Hamar Delevingne and Pandora Anne Delevingne (née Stevens). She grew up in Belgravia and attended the independent Bedales School. She is the elder sister of model and actress Cara Delevingne.

Delevingne's maternal grandfather was publishing executive and English Heritage chairman Sir Jocelyn Stevens. Her paternal grandmother was the socialite The Hon. Angela Margo Hamar Greenwood. Her paternal grandaunt was the courtesan Doris Delevingne.

Delevingne is a muse and friend of fashion designer Matthew Williamson, and previously shared a New York apartment with actress Sienna Miller.

In October 2012, Delevingne became engaged to James Cook, a former model, who works for his family's aerospace company. They were married in May 2014. In March 2023, it was announced that Delevingne was dating Prince Constantine Alexios of Greece and Denmark, creating speculation that Delevingne and Cook have separated permanently.

On January 18, 2025, it was announced that Delevingne and her new boyfriend Archie Keswick were expecting their first child. On July 4, 2025, Delevingne announced that she gave birth to their daughter, born on May 20, 2025.

== Career ==
In 2004, Delevingne was featured on the music video "Sunday Morning" by Maroon 5, as the karaoke singer in Japan.

Delevingne was spotted by Storm Management founder Sarah Doukas in 2008.

She has modelled for brands such as Shiatzy Chen, Laura Ashley, Anya Hindmarch, Alberta Ferretti, and Burberry, has walked the runway for brands including Julien Macdonald and Giles Deacon, and has worked with photographers such as Terry Richardson. Having caught the eye of designer Marc Jacobs, she became the face of the Louis Vuitton summer 2012 collection. Delevingne has graced the covers of Vogue (Turkey), Harper's Bazaar (Korea), Elle (Mexico, Ukraine, Korea, Norway) and Love.

Delevingne is a Young Ambassador for the British Fashion Council, a Chanel brand ambassador, and serves as a spokesperson representing Jo Malone London.

In 2017, Delevingne played the role of Clara Von Gluckfberg in Kingsman: The Golden Circle, and the role of Adrianna Colonna in The Aspern Papers directed by Julien Landais.

In 2020, Delevingne and her sisters (the older Chloe and the younger Cara) launched Della Vite, a range of Prosecco wines marketed as sustainably produced and vegan. The brand was named after the phrase "of the vine" (Della Vite in Italian and Delevingne in French).

In 2023, it was announced that Delevingne will appear in Rohit Karn Batra's drama The Gun on Second Street. Her role has yet to be announced.

== Filmography ==
=== Film ===
Year	Title	Role	Notes
2009	The Boat That Rocked	Model	
2009	Perfect	Liberty	Short film
2014	She's Funny That Way	Macy's Greeter	
2016	Absolutely Fabulous: The Movie	Fashion Show / Huki Muki Attendee	
2016	Elvis & Nixon	Stewardess #4	
2017	King Arthur: Legend of the Sword	Igraine	
2017	Kingsman: The Golden Circle	Clara Von Gluckfberg	
2018	The Aspern Papers	Signora Colonna	
2019	Bittersweet Symphony	Abigail	
2020	Spy Intervention	Pam Grayson	
2022	Assailant	Zoe	

=== Television ===
Year	Title	Role	Notes
2012	Britain and Ireland's Next Top Model	Herself / Guest Judge	Series 8, Episode: "Episode 10"
2015	I Live with Models	Sophie	Episode: "The Suit"
2015	The Royals	Tiara	Episode: "We Are Pictures, or Mere Beasts"
2018	Genius	Marie-Thérèse Walter	Recurring role (season 2)
2019–2020	Riviera	Daphne Eltham	Main cast (series 2–3)

=== Music videos ===
Year	Title	Artist(s)	Role	Ref.
2004	"Sunday Morning"	Maroon 5	Karaoke Singer	
2017	"Sing Out"	Herself and Karen Elson	Store Owner	

== Ancestry ==
Ancestors of Poppy Delevingne

8. Edward Charles Delevingne
4. Edward Dudley Delevingne
2. Charles Delevingne
10. Hamar Greenwood, 1st Viscount Greenwood
5. The Hon. Angela Margo Greenwood
11. Margery Spencer
1. Poppy Delevingne
12. Maj. Charles Greville Bartlett Stewart-Stevens
6. Sir Jocelyn Stevens
26. Sir Edward Hulton, 1st Baronet
13. Betty Hulton
27. Fanny Elizabeth Warriss, aka. Millie Lindon
3. Pandora Anne Stevens
28. Sir Berkeley Sheffield, 6th Baronet
14. John Vincent Sheffield
29. Baroness Julia de Tuyll van Serooskerken
7. Jane Armyne Sheffield
30. Sir Lionel Lawson Faudel-Phillips, 3rd Baronet
15. Charlotte Churchill Hubbard
31. Armyne Evelyn Gordon (granddaughter of Charles Gordon, 10th Marquess of Huntly)
