= Angela Delevingne =

English socialite (1912–2014)

The Honourable Angela Delevingne
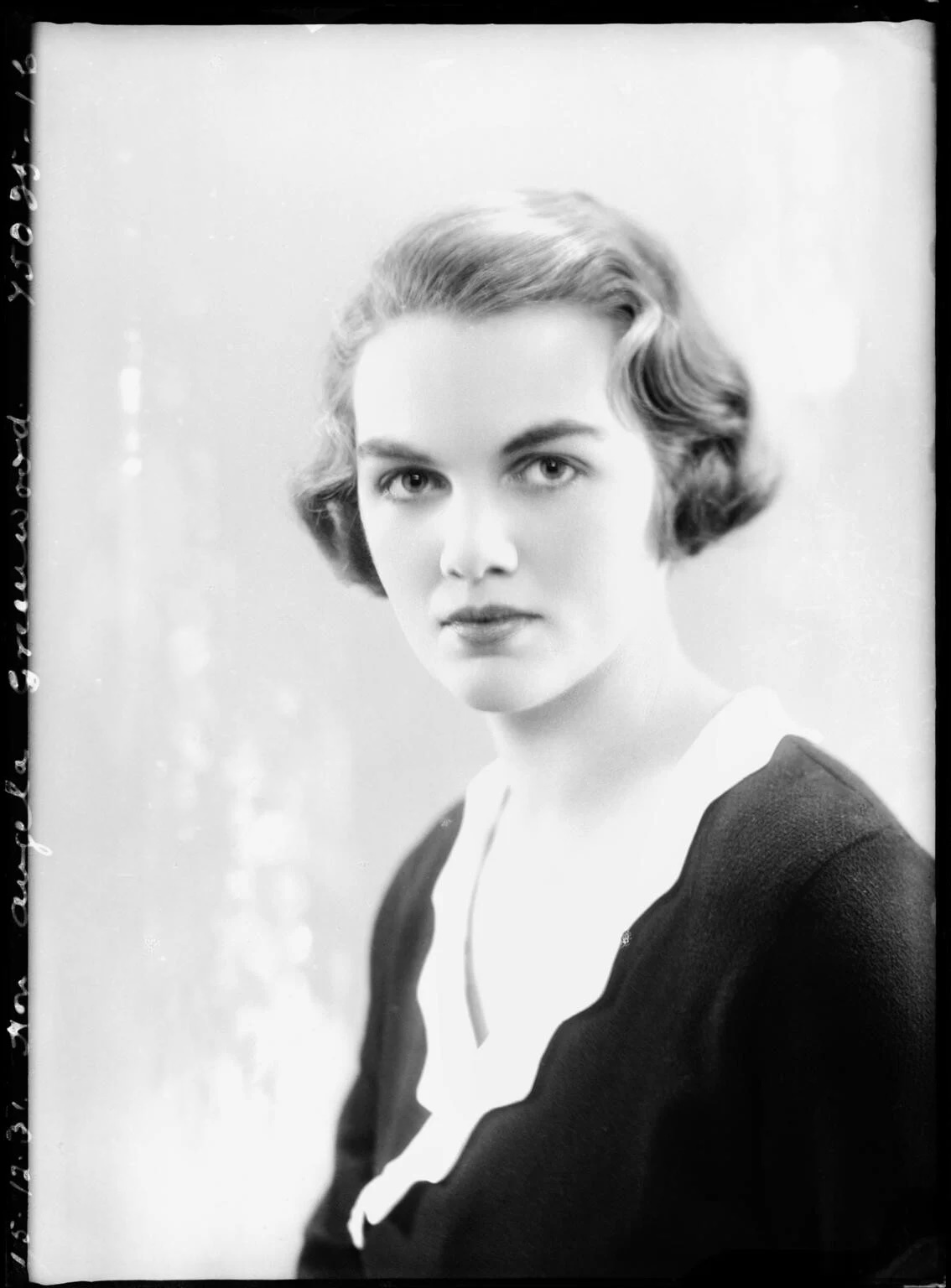
- Delevingne in 1931
- Born: Angela Margo Hamar Greenwood; 8 July 1912; South Kensington, London, England
- Died: 30 December 2014 (aged 102)
- Education: Queen's Gate School; St. Monica's, Walton Heath; Slade School of Fine Art
- Occupation: socialite
- Spouse: Edward Dudley Delevingne
- Children: 4, including Charles Delevingne
- Parent(s): Hamar Greenwood, 1st Viscount Greenwood; Margery Spencer
- Relatives: Poppy Delevingne (granddaughter); Cara Delevingne (granddaughter); Doris Browne, Viscountess Castlerosse (sister-in-law)

Angela Margo Hamar Delevingne (née Greenwood; 8 July 1912 – 30 December 2014) was an English aristocrat and socialite. The daughter of Hamar Greenwood, 1st Viscount Greenwood, she was a debutante in the late 1920s and was presented at court in 1930. Somewhat rebellious in nature, she was pulled out from Slade School of Fine Art, where she had been studying to be a painter, by her mother due to her making "unconventional" life choices. As a teenager, she took a job at Foyles to prove her independence, to which the Evening Standard reported a story with the headline Peer's Daughter Works For A Living. As a member of the London social scene, she was courted by Francis Yeats-Brown before marrying Edward Dudley Delevingne, a divorcé and friend of Edward, Prince of Wales, much to the dismay of Lady Greenwood.

As a married woman, Delevingne spent time in Venice as part of her sister-in-law Viscountess Castlerosse's entourage, where she was introduced to Prince Philip of Greece and Denmark. Her aunt, Lady Mount Temple, was Prince Philip's grandaunt. She and her husband were also frequent guests of Hollywood stars including Clark Gable, Paulette Goddard, and Charlie Chaplin. A centenarian, she credited her long life to drinking whiskey and doing crossword puzzles. Her grandchildren include Poppy Delevingne and Cara Delevingne.

== Early life and family ==
Delevingne was born Angela Margo Hamar Greenwood on 8 July 1912 in London to Hamar Greenwood, a Canadian-born British politician and lawyer, and Margery Spencer, an officer of the Most Venerable Order of the Hospital of St. John of Jerusalem, Chairwoman of the Women's Section of the Comrades of the Great War, and descendant of Robert Spear Hudson. At the time of her birth, her father was a Member of Parliament representing York. Her mother was the daughter of Rev. Walter Spencer of Fownhope Court in Herefordshire. She was a niece of Muriel Emily Spencer Ashley, Lady Mount Temple and of Leo Amery. Delevigne had two brothers, David Henry Hamar Greenwood, 2nd Viscount Greenwood and Michael George Hamar Greenwood, 3rd Viscount Greenwood, and a younger sister, Deborah Hamar Greenwood.

On 8 February 1915, her father was created a baronet, of Onslow Gardens in the Royal Borough of Kensington in the Baronetage of the United Kingdom by George V. In 1922 her mother, then styled as Lady Greenwood, was made a Dame Commander of the Order of the British Empire.

As a child, Delevingne had to be carried down the stairs by a butler in her family's South Kensington home to take shelter during a Zeppelin raid in the First World War. When Delevingne was seven years old she was almost kidnapped from Harrods, but a police officer knocked her assailant to the floor. Her father served as the last Chief Secretary of Ireland from 1920 to 1922, during which time she and her siblings were given police protection owing to fears about attacks from the Irish Republican Army. In 1929 her father was elevated to the peerage, having been created Baron Greenwood, of Llanbister in the County of Radnor. Due to her father's elevation to the peerage, Delevingne was entitled to use the style The Honourable. In 1937, when Delevingne was twenty-five years old, her father was created Viscount Greenwood.

== Education ==
She was educated at Queen's Gate School and St. Monica's, Walton Heath. When she was fifteen years old she was sent to a finishing school in Florence, Italy. Upon her return to England, she enrolled at the Slade School of Fine Art to study painting. Her mother later pulled her out of the school. When she was seventeen years old, she got a job at Foyles as an act of independence. The Evening Standard reported on her employment with the headline "Peer's Daughter Works For A Living".

== Debut, marriage, and adult life ==
A debutante of the London scene, she was presented at court in 1930. During this time she was courted by Francis Yeats-Brown, author of The lives of a Bengal Lancer and the son of British diplomat Montague Yeats-Brown. During Cowes Week in 1935, she was introduced to Edward Dudley Delevingne, a stockbroker and friend of The Prince of Wales. He sent a note over to her while she was dining with her parents at the Gloucester Hotel on the Isle of Wight. In 1937, against the wishes of her mother, she married Delevingne, who had previously been married to Countess Felicia Gizycki, a daughter of Cissy Patterson. The marriage put a strain on Delevingne's relationship with her mother.

In 1938 Delevingne was introduced to Prince Philip of Greece and Denmark while vacationing in Venice. Delevingne's aunt, Lady Mount Temple, was the stepmother of Edwina Mountbatten, Countess Mountbatten of Burma, who was Prince Philip's aunt. After meeting Prince Philip, who the following year would be introduced to his future wife, Princess Elizabeth, Delevingne reportedly said "he’d make someone a very good husband one day."

As a married woman, Delevingne made visits to Hollywood and befriended Charlie Chaplin, Paulette Goddard, and Clarke Gable. David O. Selznick offered her a role in Gone With the Wind, which she declined due to being pregnant. She and her husband made frequent trips to Venice to stay with her sister-in-law Doris Browne, Viscountess Castlerosse.

The Delevingnes had two children before the outbreak of World War II, Anne Venetia Charlotte Delevingne and Edward Hamar Delevingne. During the war, her husband served in the Royal Fusiliers in North Africa. After the war ended the couple had two more children, Charles Delevingne and Elizabeth Caroline Felicia Delevingne. They lived in London, Surrey, and Wiltshire. Her husband worked in property and real estate, helping secure Thatched House Lodge for Princess Alexandra of Kent and The Honourable Sir Angus Ogilvy and securing Sutton Place for J. Paul Getty. She was the grandmother of models Poppy Delevingne and Cara Delevingne.

A centenarian, she credited her long life to whiskey and crossword puzzles. She died on 30 December 2014.
