= Doris Brown =

Doris Brown may be:

- Doris Brown Heritage, world class runner and coach
- Doris Browne (singer), noted R&B singer
- Doris Browne, Viscountess Castlerosse
