= Margo Greenwood =

Margo Greenwood may refer to:

- Margo Lainne Greenwood (fl. 2021), Canadian Indigenous scholar
- Margery Greenwood, Viscountess Greenwood (1886-1968), known as Margo
