= James Gordon (bishop of Jarrow) =

Priest and bishop in the Church of England

- Bishop of Jarrow
- Church: Church of England
- In office: 1932–1938

Personal details
- Born: James Geoffrey Gordon; 11 December 1881 United Kingdom
- Died: 28 August 1938 (aged 56) United Kingdom
- Denomination: Christianity
- Spouse: Martha Sabrina Brinton

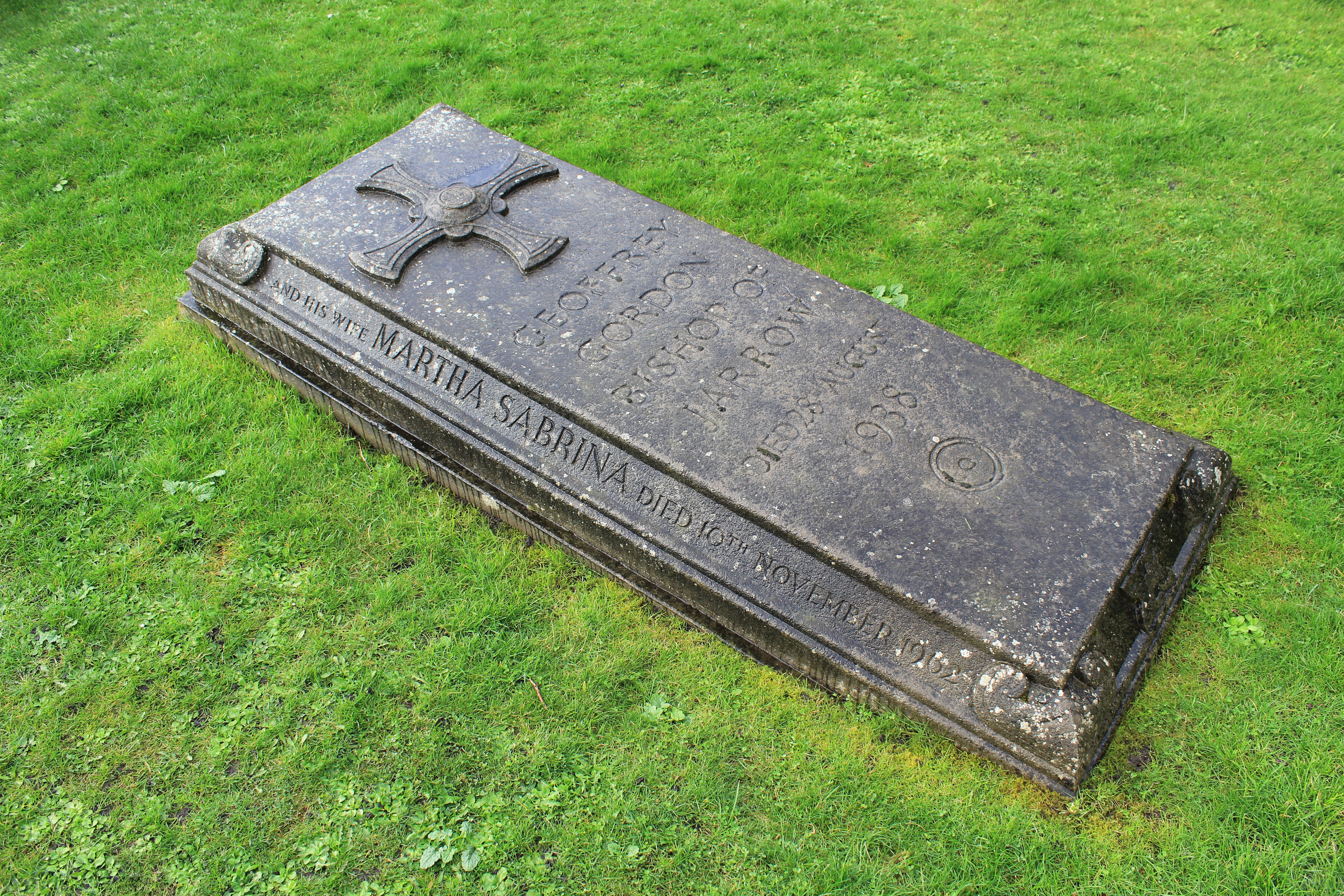
Gordon's gravestone outside Durham Cathedral

James Geoffrey Gordon (11 December 1881 – 28 August 1938) was a priest and bishop in the Church of England.

== Life ==
James Gordon was the son of J. E. H. Gordon, an early electrical engineer and Alice Mary Gordon (née Brandreth) later Lady Danesfort, an author and domestic electrical pioneer. He was educated at Eton College and Trinity College, Cambridge. He was President of the Cambridge Union in 1902.

He was Private Secretary to Lord President of the Council 1904 - 1906. He was called to the Bar in 1906 but soon embarked on a change of direction. He was ordained in 1909, and served as a curate in London. During the Great War, he was a Temporary Chaplain to the Forces (TCF), and was posted to France then Italy, ending the War as Deputy Assistant Chaplain-General. He wrote ‘Papers in Picardy’ with Reverend T W Pym DSO and contributed an essay to ‘The Church in the Furnace’ a critical view by TCFs of the Church's deficiencies in time of war. From 1919 to 1926, he was Rector of St John's in Edinburgh and from 1926 to 1932 was Vicar of St Mary, Nottingham. He was appointed suffragan bishop of Jarrow in 1932 but died in August, 1938. His special responsibility throughout Durham but particularly in Jarrow was providing support during a severe period of unemployment causing considerable hardship. Although he did not believe that hunger marches were effective, he held a service for the Jarrow March and gave it his blessing. After his death, the Bishop of Durham praised Gordon for ‘the cheery comradeship in effort, for the words of sympathy and wisdom, for the comfort of his presence, and for the spur of his example’.

Gordon married Martha Sabrina Brinton In 1912.

Church of England titles
| Preceded by George Frederick Terry | Rector of St John the Evangelist, Edinburgh; 1919–1926 | Succeeded by Charles Ritchie |
| Preceded by Thomas Field | Vicar of St. Mary's Church, Nottingham; 1926–1933 | Succeeded by Neville Talbot |
| Preceded by Samuel Knight | Bishop of Jarrow; 1932–1938 | Succeeded by Leslie Owen |
