= Delavigne =

Delavigne is a surname. Notable people with the surname include:

- Germain Delavigne (1790–1868), French dramatist and librettist
- Casimir Delavigne (1793–1843), French poet, dramatist and librettist
- Philibert Delavigne (c1700–1750), French composer

== See also ==
- Delevingne
- Lavine
- Levine
- Levinger
