= Arnold Rowntree =

English Quake, and Liberal MP for York (1872 – 1951)

Arnold Stephenson Rowntree
- Arnold Rowntree in 1911

Member of Parliament for York
- In office 10 January 1910 – 14 December 1918 Serving with John Butcher
- Preceded by: Hamar Greenwood; Denison Faber
- Succeeded by: John Butcher

Personal details
- Born: 28 November 1872
- Died: 21 May 1951 (aged 78)
- Party: Liberal

Arnold Stephenson Rowntree (28 November 1872 – 21 May 1951) was a Quaker and Liberal MP for York, England.

== Background ==
He was the son of John Stephenson Rowntree and Elizabeth Hotham of York. He was the nephew of Joseph Rowntree (1836–1925), philanthropist and chocolate manufacturer. He was educated at Friends' School, Bootham, York. He married in 1907, Mary Katharine Harvey of Leeds. They had three sons and three daughters, including Tessa Rowntree who helped refugees flee Czechoslovakia before World War II.

== Politics ==
He was Honorary Secretary of the National Adult School Council. He was elected to Parliament at the January 1910 United Kingdom general election as a member for York. As a Quaker he opposed war and early in the First World War was involved in the Union of Democratic Control, a British anti-war group, which he left in response to pressure from the Liberal Party. He was also associated with fellow Liberal MP Thomas Edmund Harvey in an amendment to the provision for conscientious objectors in the Military Service Act 1916. The same year, he took up the cause of the Richmond Sixteen, a group of conscientious objectors who were sent to France after refusing to undertake even non-combatant duties.

Rowntree was defeated in the 1918 post-war election, and thereafter concentrated on his business. However, he was President of the York Liberal Association and also President of the Educational Centres Association.

== Business ==
He was a Director of the family chocolate business, Rowntree and Co. (Limited), cocoa manufacturers. He was a Director of North of England Newspaper Co. (Limited), The Nation, the Westminster Press and Associated Papers.

He was one of the original directors of the Joseph Rowntree Reform Trust, from 1904 to 1951, and the Chair of the trust 1925–1938, following Joseph Rowntree and succeeded by Benjamin Seebohm Rowntree.

Parliament of the United Kingdom
Preceded by Denison Faber and Hamar Greenwood	Member of Parliament for York; Jan. 1910–1918; With: John Butcher	Succeeded by John George Butcher (Representation reduced to one member)
