= James Edward Henry Gordon =

British electrical engineer

Gordon, James Edward Henry
- Born: 26 June 1852; Dorking, UK
- Died: 3 February 1893 (aged 40); Croydon, UK
- Education: Cambridge
- Known for: Electric lighting
- Scientific career
- Fields: Electrical engineering

James Edward Henry Gordon (26 June 1852 – 3 February 1893) was a British electrical engineer, the son of James Alexander Gordon (1793–1872). He took his B.A. at Caius College, Cambridge in 1876.

Gordon designed large electrical machines, such as an early 350 kilowatt alternator, and wrote extensively on practical electrical problems such as lighting. In 1875, he published results of experiments on electrical constants done at the Cavendish Laboratory under the supervision of James Clerk Maxwell. In 1878 he was assistant secretary to the British Association. In 1879, he published "Electrostatic Induction" based on lectures and in 1880 released "Physical Treatise on Electricity and Magnetism." After 1882 he turned to consulting engineering and construction of central station power plants. He was manager of the electric lighting department at the Telegraph Construction and Maintenance Company in 1883. In 1884 he released "Practical Treatise on Electric Lighting." He was engineer for the Metropolitan Electric Supply Company in 1888–9, then in 1889 he started practice with W. J. Rivington, forming "J. E. H. Gordon and Company".

His wife Alice Mary Gordon (née Brandreth, later Lady Danesfort on her second marriage) was an author and domestic electrical pioneer. She wrote a popular book on application of electricity to household lighting in 1891. The couple had three children, Dorothy Frances, Peter Christian and James Geoffrey Gordon (1881–1938) who became Bishop of Jarrow. Gordon died from injuries sustained from a fall from his horse on 3 February 1893.
