= The Gun on Second Street =

Upcoming drama film

- Directed by: Rohit Karn Batra
- Written by: Rohit Karn Batra
- Produced by: Rohit Karn Batra; Guy J. Louthan
- Starring: Poppy Delevingne; Tom Arnold; Rumer Willis; Dianna Agron
- Cinematography: Léo Hinstin
- Production companies: Ransom Films; The Film Compartment
- Country: United States
- Language: English

The Gun on Second Street is an upcoming American drama film written and directed by Rohit Karn Batra.

== Cast ==
- Tom Arnold as Dick Steinberger
- Rumer Willis as Ashley Pullman
- Noah Fearnley as Jake Meadows
- Shô Oyamada as Mysterious Man
- Poppy Delevingne
- Jack Kesy
- Dianna Agron

== Production ==
The majority of the film has been shot in Wheeling, West Virginia. In December 2025, Dianna Agron joined the cast, with Eric Swalwell and Sean Penn serving as executive producers. Later that month Penn and Swalwell removed their names from the credits of the film due to the film technicians strike.

=== Film technicians union strike ===
In December 2025, a majority of film technicians working on The Gun on Second Street announced their intention to unionize with the International Alliance of Theatrical Stage Employees. After producers declined to recognize the union or enter into what IATSE described as good-faith negotiations, the crew initiated a strike on December 18, 2025, with IATSE directing its members not to cross the picket line. The production was covered by a SAG-AFTRA agreement but not by contracts with IATSE or several other major industry unions.
