= Alice Mary Gordon =

British author

- Born: 22 October 1854; Shimla
- Died: 18 June 1929 (aged 74); South Kensington, London
- Occupation: Writer

Alice Mary Gordon (22 October 1854 – 18 June 1929) was a British author and writer on the aesthetics of domestic electricity. During her life she was known by her husbands' names, making her Alice Gordon or Mrs J E H Gordon as well as Alice Butcher, Mrs John Butcher and Lady Danesfort.

== Early life ==
Alice Gordon was born Alice Mary Brandreth in Shimla, India in 1854 to Edward Lyall Brandreth (1823 - 1907) and Louisa Marriott (1826 - 1897). Her father was in the Indian Civil Service, finishing his career as a Member of the Legislative Council for India and later serving as a Justice of the Peace in Middlesex. She was their only child. Her parents settled in England in 1870, but Gordon returned before that date to live with her maternal grandparents in Liverpool and then in South Kensington, London. In 1867, she met the poet and novelist George Meredith, who would go on to be a lifelong friend and correspondent, encouraging her to pursue her interest in writing. It is said that Meredith's character Cecilia Haskett in Beauchamp's Career (1874–75) is based on Gordon.

== Alice Gordon ==
On the 11 April 1878, she married the electrical engineer James Edward Henry Gordon and quickly took a close interest in supporting his commercial electrical activities until his sudden death on 3 February 1893, whereupon she returned to writing on other topics. They had three children, Dorothy Frances, Peter Christian and James Geoffrey Gordon. It was through collaborating with her husband that she became interested in electricity. James Gordon had studied this topic at the Cavendish Laboratory in Cambridge under James Clerk Maxwell, and the couple's first marital home in Dorking was adapted to extend such work. As she later wrote: 'Our early married life was spent in the country, where we owned a large laboratory and a small house attached. In those days I was bottle-washer and laboratory assistant to my husband'.

When they moved to London, their home became a kind of salon for those of a technical mind with an interest in developing the uses of electricity and they moved in well-connected social circles; in 1882 Mrs Gordon was presented to Queen Victoria. While her husband became a significant figure in the metropolitan electrical schemes, Gordon became part of a movement to promote the domestic use of electricity, using her own home in Kensington as a showcase. Specifically, in order to support her spouse's electrical lighting consultancy business she wrote a piece for the Fortnightly Review in February 1891, assisted into the world of journalism by George Meredith, a long-time contributor to that periodical.

Gordon's aim was to encourage wealthy middle class householders to consider adopting electric light in their homes at a time when electrical lighting was only available in some UK cities, and was greatly more expensive to run than gas lighting, oil lamps or paraffin lamps. Her Fortnightly Review piece titled 'The Development of Decorative Electricity' presented electricity as an enjoyable luxury illuminant for the wealthy elite; Gordon thus emphasised how carefully-applied decorative techniques could ensure that the often clinical qualities of early incandescent electrical lighting could be shielded from tired eyes.

In the same year, her approach of melding interior decoration with the new lighting opportunities led to a book Decorative Electricity (1891), for which she assumed the title of Mrs J.E.H. Gordon. This demonstrates the depth of her experience and expertise in domestic electric installation acquired from collaborating with her spouse, J.E.H.Gordon, writing with the authority of an engineer's spouse, although he is separately credited with a chapter on the then notorious 'Fire Risks' of electricity. The book's line-drawing illustrations by Herbert Fell elegantly portray a rich array of suggestions for how (implicitly female) householders should light each room of the house electrically, including the servants' quarters. These suggestions borrowed eclectically from various cultural sources: a Cairo or a Pompeii lamp were recommended for the hallway and staircase; dragon pendants and Venetian glass for the dining-room, with cupids and Carton-Pierre brackets advised for the lady's boudoir. A chapter on 'Shops and Public Buildings' condemned the use of harsh overhead lighting that Gordon reported made many women feel uncomfortable by casting dark shadows under their eyes. Decorative Electricity closes with a chapter on 'Some Personal Experiences' which shows how closely Gordon collaborated with her husband, often acting as his deputy, confidante and translator for the Gordon consultancy business.

Her expertise became known nationwide and a second (cheaper) edition of Decorative Electricity was published in 1892, listing many positive reviews from newspapers - except for the hostile responses journals linked to the gas industry, and with many advertisers in the outer pages clearly seeking to target the decorative electric lighting market. Encouraged by George Meredith, she published her first novel, Eunice Anscombe, in 1892, however the novel was critically well-received and it was the only novel she wrote. She latterly worked with Agnes Clerke and Mrs Humphry Ward to ensure the representation of women writers in The Woman's Building at the Chicago Exhibition in 1893. After her husband died in a horse riding accident that same year, she returned to journalism again writing, for example, on 'Women as Students in Design' in 1894.

== Alice Butcher ==
Following the death of her first husband, she married the lawyer and politician John George Butcher, 1st and last Baron Danesfort, on 9 April 1898 in Kensington, London. When he was elevated to Baron Danesfort on 19 February 1924, Gordon became Lady Danesfort. She was a friend of Robert Louis Stevenson, and maintained a close correspondence with George Meredith until his death in 1909. In 1919, she wrote a memoir of Meredith, detailing their friendship and his influence on her literary career. She died on 16 June 1929 in London and was buried in Brompton Cemetery.

== Bibliography ==
- Decorative Electricity, 1891
- Eunice Anscombe, 1892
- Women as students in design, 1894
- Memories of George Meredith, 1919
