= Hamar Greenwood, 1st Viscount Greenwood =

British politician (1870–1948)

The Right Honourable The Viscount Greenwood KC PC
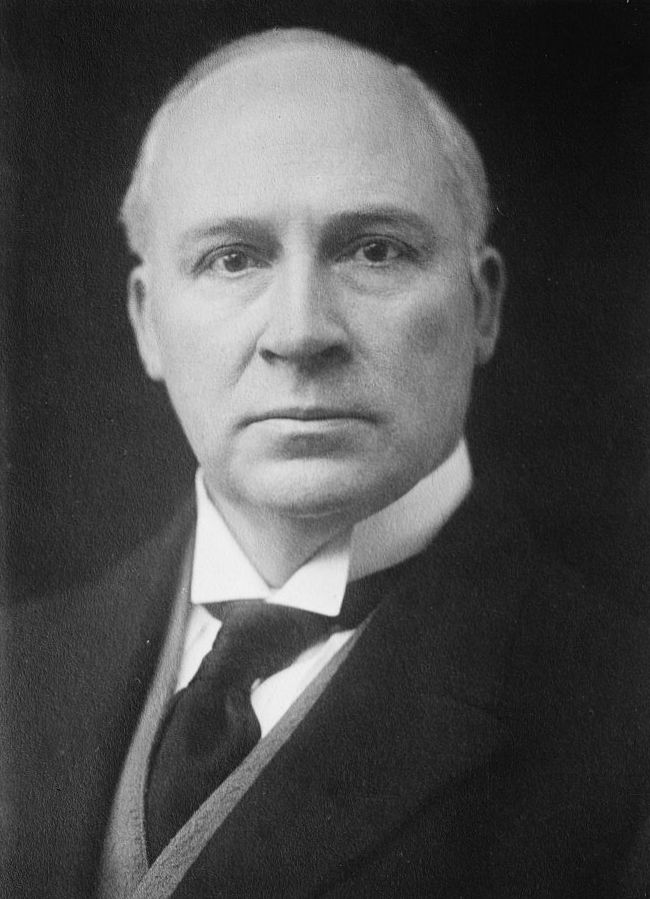

Chief Secretary for Ireland
- In office 2 April 1920 – 19 October 1922
- Monarch: George V
- Prime Minister: David Lloyd George
- Preceded by: Ian Macpherson
- Succeeded by: Office abolished - replaced by Chairman of the Provisional Government of the Irish Free State

Secretary for Overseas Trade
- In office 1919–1920
- Board Pres.: Sir Auckland Geddes
- Preceded by: Sir Arthur Steel-Maitland
- Succeeded by: F. G. Kellaway

Member of Parliament for York
- In office 8 February 1906 – 10 January 1910 Serving with Denison Faber
- Preceded by: John Butcher; Denison Faber
- Succeeded by: Arnold Stephenson Rowntree; John Butcher

Personal details
- Born: 7 February 1870 Whitby, Ontario, Canada
- Died: 10 September 1948 (aged 78) London, Middlesex, England
- Party: Liberal; Conservative
- Spouse: Margery Spencer (1886–1968) (m. 1911)
- Children: 4; including Angela
- Education: University of Toronto

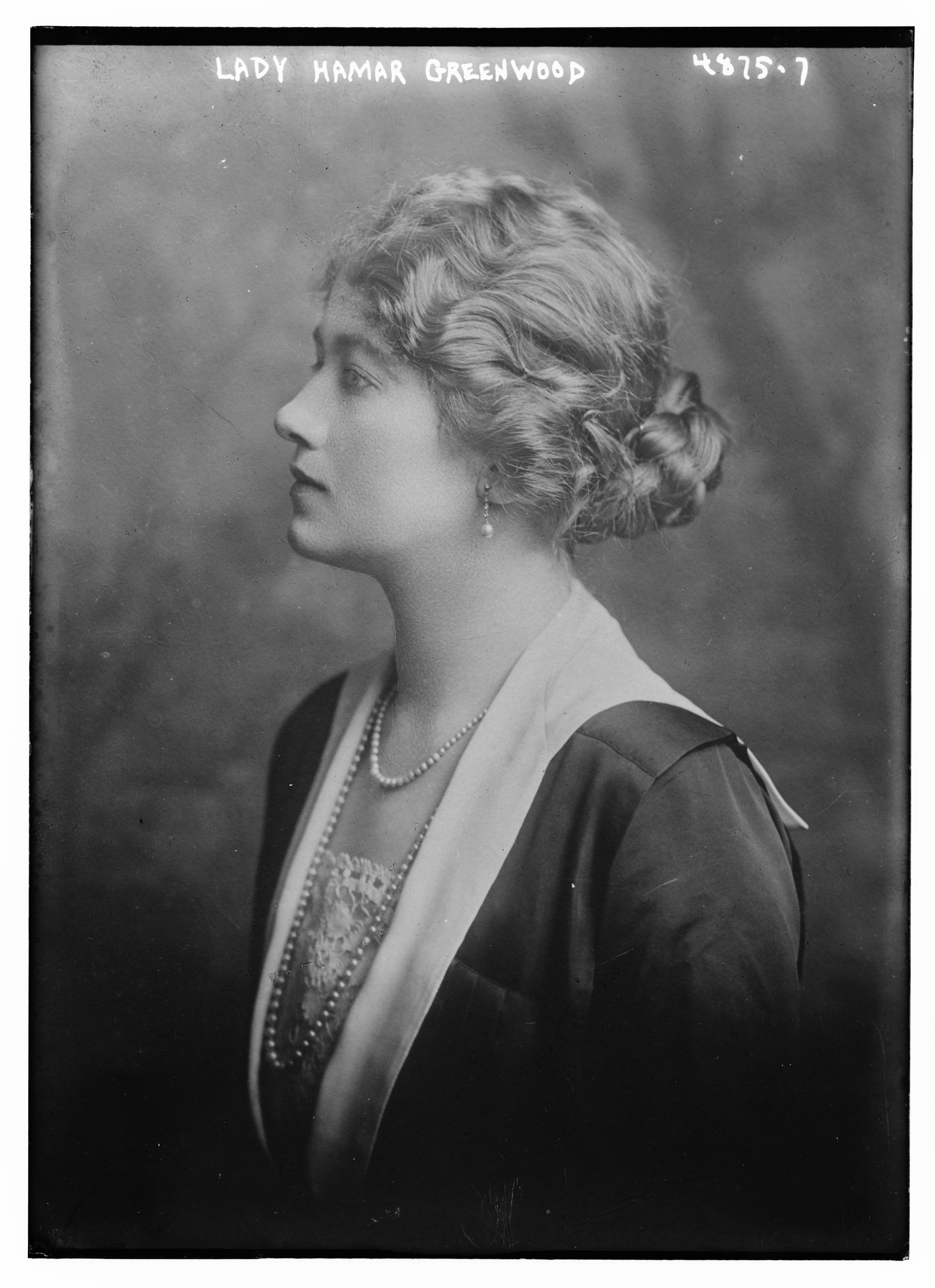
Lady Greenwood in 1918

Thomas Hamar Greenwood, 1st Viscount Greenwood, PC, KC (7 February 1870 – 10 September 1948), known as Sir Hamar Greenwood, 1st Baronet between 1915 and 1929, was a Canadian-born British politician. He served as the last Chief Secretary for Ireland between 1920 and 1922, as which he was responsible for the Black and Tans.

== Family and Early Life ==
Greenwood was born in Whitby, Ontario, Canada, to John Hamar Greenwood (1829–1903), a lawyer who had emigrated from Llanbister, Radnorshire, Wales, and Charlotte Churchill Hubbard, who was from a United Empire Loyalist family that had an ancestor who immigrated to Canada after the American Revolutionary War.

He studied at the University of Toronto, from which he earned a BA in 1895, and subsequently worked for the Canadian Department of Agriculture. He dabbled in the theatre in Canada during his youth.

He worked as a stableman on a cattle-boat to earn his passage to Britain, where he arrived with little money. Winston Churchill’s wife Clementine described Greenwood as “nothing but a blaspheming, hearty, vulgar, brave, knock-about Colonial”. He was a self-made man.

== Military career ==
Greenwood spent seven years as an officer in the Canadian militia. He was commissioned as a Lieutenant in King Edward's Horse (The King's Overseas Dominions Regiment), a London-based Militia unit, in 1902 and was promoted to Captain in 1905. He went onto the Reserve in 1913. On the outbreak of World War I in August 1914, he served in the Department of Recruiting at the War Office, and when David Lloyd George formed the Welsh National Executive Committee to recruit a Welsh Army Corps for 'Kitchener's Army' Greenwood was appointed Lieutenant-Colonel to raise and command the 10th (Service) Battalion, South Wales Borderers (1st Gwent) in December. He took the battalion to the Western Front in December 1915, but was recalled to serve as a Deputy Assistant Adjutant-General at the War Office in April 1916 before the unit saw serious action. He was later appointed Honorary Colonel of the Winnipeg Grenadiers.

== Career ==
He spoke at temperance meetings across Britain and qualified as a barrister at Gray's Inn in 1906. He was elected, as Member of Parliament for York for the Liberal Party, in 1906, and held a seat in the House of Commons for most of the next 23 years, including for Sunderland from 1910 to 1922. He advocated Irish home-rule: and said in 1911 “Ireland has been shamefully treated [and] “is justly entitled to local self-government”.

In 1912, he represented the Allan Line and the Canadian Pacific Line during the British inquiry into the sinking of RMS Titanic, watching proceedings on their behalf.

Greenwood's wife Margery Spencer had an affair with Lloyd George that probably contributed to Greenwood's baronetcy, of Onslow Gardens in the Royal Borough of Kensington, of 1915.

He served under David Lloyd George as Under-Secretary of State for the Home Department in 1919, as Additional Under-Secretary of State for Foreign Affairs, Additional Parliamentary Secretary to the Board of Trade, as Secretary for Overseas Trade from 1919 to 1920.

=== Chief Secretary for Ireland ===
Greenwood was appointed the last Chief Secretary for Ireland, with a seat in the Cabinet, from 1920 to 1922. He had had no Cabinet experience when he was appointed Chief Secretary for Ireland in the spring of 1920. He was made a Privy Counsellor in 1920.

As Chief Secretary, Greenwood responsible for the aggressive use of two specially formed paramilitary forces – the Black and Tans and the Auxiliaries – during the Irish War of Independence. Greenwood’s claims that the Black and Tans were under control ‘made him a laughing stock and a political pariah’.

Lord Riddell, a friend of Prime Minister Lloyd George, stated that, although Greenwood's life was in constant danger from the Irish rebels, Greenwood "[seemed] to be tackling his job with great fearlessness and to be giving the Sinn Feiners some of their own medicine." After the Burning of Cork by British auxiliary forces in December 1920, Greenwood blamed the "Sinn Féin rebels" and the people of Cork for burning their city. Greenwood was described by a 21st-century Irish journalist as "A Lloyd George loyalist who believed in restoring British rule in Ireland by defeating the IRA, Greenwood’s denials and evasions became so frequent that he was lampooned with the phrase 'to tell a Greenwood'".

Greenwood lost his seat in the 1922 general election. At the 1924 general election, he was one of a small number of Liberals, including Winston Churchill, to stand as Constitutionalist candidates. These were Liberals who advocated closer ties between Liberals and Conservatives. Greenwood's candidature in Walthamstow East was supported by the local Conservative association, but not by the local Liberals, who had their own candidate, and he won the seat. After the election, when it appeared that there was no prospect of closer formal ties between the two parties, Greenwood took the Conservative whip. He continued to represent Walthamstow East until 1929, although he never held government office again.

== Post-Government ==
In the 1929 Dissolution Honours, Greenwood was raised to the peerage as Baron Greenwood, of Llanbister in the County of Radnor. In 1937, he was created Viscount Greenwood, of Holbourne in the County of London. He was president of the British Iron and Steel Federation from 1938 to 1939, chairman of the Pilgrims Society from 1945 to 1948, and president of the Pilgrims Society in 1948.

He died on 10 September 1948 in London, England.

== Family ==
His wife was Margery Spencer, daughter of The Rev. Walter Spencer of Fownhope Court, Herefordshire, and the same's wife Anne "Annie" Elizabeth Hudson. She was 17 years Greenwood's junior. She was made a Dame Commander of the Most Excellent Order of the British Empire (DBE) in 1922.

They had two sons and two daughters. Their elder son, David Henry Hamar Greenwood, succeeded his father as second Viscount. He died unmarried and was succeeded as third Viscount by his younger brother, Michael George Hamar Greenwood, who also died unmarried in 2003, when the title of Viscount Greenwood therefore became extinct.

Their elder daughter, Angela, married Edward Dudley Delevingne and was the paternal grandmother of model sisters Poppy and Cara Delevingne. Their younger daughter, Deborah Hamar Greenwood, married Patrick David de László, son of painter Philip de László.

== Arms ==
Coat of arms of Hamar Greenwood, 1st Viscount Greenwood
| Crest A Demi Lion per fess Gules and Sable resting the sinister paw on a Portcullis Or Escutcheon Gules on a Chevron Ermine between three Saltires as many Portcullises Or Supporters On either side a Lion rampant per fess Gules and Sable supporting a Staff Or flowing therefrom a Banner Argent that on the dexter charged with a Rose Gules barbed and seeded proper and that on the sinister charged with a Maple Leaf also proper Motto Law and Loyalty |

Parliament of the United Kingdom
| Preceded by John Butcher; Denison Faber | Member of Parliament for York; 1906 – Jan. 1910; With: Denison Faber | Succeeded by Arnold Stephenson Rowntree; John Butcher |
| Preceded by Samuel Storey; James Knott | Member of Parliament for Sunderland; Dec. 1910 – 1922; With: Frank Goldstone, 1910–1918; Ralph Milbanke Hudson, 1918–1922 | Succeeded by Luke Thompson; Sir Walter Raine |
| Preceded by Stanley Johnson | Member of Parliament for Walthamstow East; 1924 – 1929 | Succeeded by Harry Wallace |
Political offices
| Preceded by William Brace | Under-Secretary of State for the Home Department; January–April 1919 | Succeeded by John Baird |
| Preceded by Sir Arthur Steel-Maitland, Bt | Secretary for Overseas Trade; 1919–1920 | Succeeded by F. G. Kellaway |
| Preceded by Ian Macpherson | Chief Secretary for Ireland; 1920 – 1922 | Office abolished |
Baronetage of the United Kingdom
| New creation | Baronet (of Onslow Gardens); 1915 – 1948 | Succeeded by David Greenwood |
Peerage of the United Kingdom
| New creation | Viscount Greenwood; 1937 – 1948 | Succeeded by David Greenwood |
| New creation | Baron Greenwood; 1929 – 1948 | Succeeded by David Greenwood |
