= List of awards and nominations received by Cara Delevingne =

The following is the list of awards and nominations received by Cara Delevingne.

Award	Year	Category	Work	Result	Ref.
British Fashion Awards	2012	Model of the Year	Herself	Won	
British Fashion Awards	2013	Model of the Year	Herself	Nominated	
British Fashion Awards	2014	Model of the Year	Herself	Won	
British Independent Film Awards	2014	Most Promising Newcomer	The Face of an Angel	Nominated	
British LGBT Awards	2016	LGBT+ Celebrity	Herself	Nominated	
British LGBT Awards	2017	LGBT+ Celebrity	Herself	Nominated	
British LGBT Awards	2018	LGBT+ Celebrity	Herself	Nominated	
CinemaCon Awards	2015	Rising stars	Paper Towns	Won	
Elle Style Awards	2015	Breakthrough Actress	Herself	Won	
Melhores do Ano Atrevida	2015	Best Actress	Paper Towns	Nominated	
Melhores do Ano Atrevida	2015	Year Look	Cara Delevingne, Paper Towns premiere	Won	
MTV Movie & TV Awards	2023	Best Kiss	Only Murders in the Building (Note: Shared with Selena Gomez.)	Nominated	
People's Choice Awards	2016	Seriously Popular Award	Herself	Nominated	
Screen Actors Guild Award	2022	Outstanding Performance by an Ensemble in a Comedy Series	Only Murders in the Building	Nominated	
Teen Choice Awards	2015	Choice Movie: Breakout Star	Paper Towns	Won	
Teen Choice Awards	2015	Choice Summer Movie Star: Female	Paper Towns	Won	
Teen Choice Awards	2015	Choice Female Hottie	Herself	Nominated	
Teen Choice Awards	2015	Choice Model	Herself	Nominated	
Teen Choice Awards	2016	Choice Movie Actress: AnTEENcipated	Suicide Squad	Won	
Teen Choice Awards	2017	Choice Summer Movie Actress	Valerian and the City of a Thousand Planets	Nominated	
Teen Choice Awards	2017	Choice Style Icon	Herself	Nominated	
Young Hollywood Awards	2014	You're So Fancy	Herself	Nominated	
