= Bache Hall =

Country house in Cheshire, England

Coordinates: 53.2067°N 2.8964°W

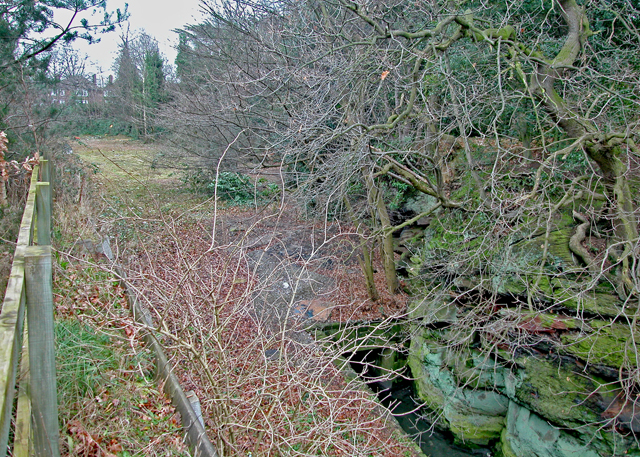
A former mill site, now part of the hall grounds

Bache Hall is a former country house in Bache, Chester, Cheshire. It replaced an earlier house that had been damaged in the Civil War. At one time a golf club house, then a hospital building, as of 2013 it provides residential accommodation for university students. The hall is recorded in the National Heritage List for England as a designated Grade II listed building.

== History ==
The original house on the site was bought in 1610 by Edward Whitby, Recorder of Chester, but was demolished following the Civil War when it was occupied by Parliamentary troops during the Siege of Chester. It was rebuilt in the early 18th century. During the 19th century it was the home of Robert Spear Hudson, manufacturer of soap powder. From 1902 it was the clubhouse of Chester Golf Club. In 1911 the house was sold to the hospital which was originally a lunatic asylum and is now the Countess of Chester Hospital. It has since been acquired by the University of Chester and, as of 2013, provides residential accommodation for its students.

== Architecture ==
Bache Hall, a former country house, is constructed in red brick with painted ashlar dressings and a slate roof. It stands on a painted chamfered plinth. The building is in two storeys with attics. Its southeast elevation has a slightly projecting central portion. At the top of the central portion is a casement window and a pediment. The other windows on this elevation are sashes. On this side of the house is a stone porch with Doric pilasters, between which are round arches, and has a moulded entablature. The southwest front contains two two-storey bow windows. On the northeast side is a 19th-century three-storey stuccoed wing with casement windows, and a 20th-century brick wing, also in three storeys.

The house was designated as a Grade II listed building on 17 January 2001. It is the only listed building in the civil parish of Bache. Grade II is the lowest of the three grades, and contains "buildings of national importance and special interest".
