= James Alexander Gordon (physician) =

English physician

- Born: 1793; Middlesex
- Died: 18 April 1872 (aged 78–79); Dorking
- Occupation: Physician

James Alexander Gordon (1793 – 18 April 1872) was an English physician.

== Biography ==
Gordon was born in 1793 in Middlesex, and graduated M.D. at Edinburgh in 1814. After studying on the continent, whence he returned to London in 1818, he established in 1819 the 'Quarterly Journal of Foreign Medicine and Surgery,' in concert with Dr. William Mackenzie of Glasgow, and wrote extensively for it. He also wrote a series of articles on German medical literature in the 'Medical Repository.' He was admitted licentiate of the Royal College of Physicians in 1821, became fellow in 1836, and was censor in 1838. He was elected assistant-physician to the London Hospital in 1827, and physician in 1828, resigning in 1844. He died at Dorking on 18 April 1872. His son was the engineer James Edward Henry Gordon.
