= Cara Delevingne =

English model and actress (born 1992)

- Delevingne in 2026
- Born: Cara Jocelyn Delevingne; 12 August 1992 (age 34); London, England
- Occupations: Model; actress; musician
- Years active: 2002–present
- Family: Delevingne
- Awards: Full list
- Modelling information
- Height: 5 ft 8 in (1.73 m)
- Hair colour: Blonde
- Eye colour: Blue

Cara Jocelyn Delevingne (/ˈkɑːrə ˌdɛləˈviːn/ KAH-rə DEL-ə-VEEN; born 12 August 1992) is an English model, actress, and musician. Delevingne won Model of the Year at the British Fashion Awards in 2012 and 2014, and has also received three Teen Choice Awards and nominations for a British Independent Film Award and an MTV Movie & TV Award.

Delevingne started her acting career with a minor role in the 2012 film adaptation of Anna Karenina by Joe Wright. Her film roles include Margo Roth Spiegelman in the romantic mystery film Paper Towns (2015), the Enchantress in the comic book film Suicide Squad (2016), and Laureline in Luc Besson's Valerian and the City of a Thousand Planets (2017).

== Early life ==
Cara Jocelyn Delevingne was born on 12 August 1992, in Hammersmith, London, the youngest daughter of property developer Charles Hamar Delevingne and Pandora Stevens Delevingne. Her paternal grandaunt was the courtesan Doris Castlerosse. Her maternal grandfather was publishing executive and English Heritage chairman Jocelyn Stevens. Her paternal grandmother was Angela Delevingne and her maternal grandmother was Jane Armyne Sheffield, a granddaughter of Lionel Faudel-Phillips, 3rd Baronet. She has two elder sisters, Chloe and Poppy, and a paternal half-brother, Alexander Jaffe.

Delevingne has 16 godparents, including actress Joan Collins and Eton College provost and former Condé Nast International president Nicholas Coleridge.

Delevingne grew up in Belgravia and, from 2003 to 2009, attended Bedales School, which she found challenging because of her dyspraxia and depression. In 2009, she left school and signed as a model with Storm Management.

Delevingne abused multiple illegal drugs starting during her adolescence, including cannabis, LSD, ketamine, Xanax, GBL, GHB, and cocaine. She also dealt illegal drugs during her adolescence. In 2022, after her thirtieth birthday, Delevingne participated in a drug rehabilitation program and has maintained sobriety since then.

== Career ==
=== Modelling ===
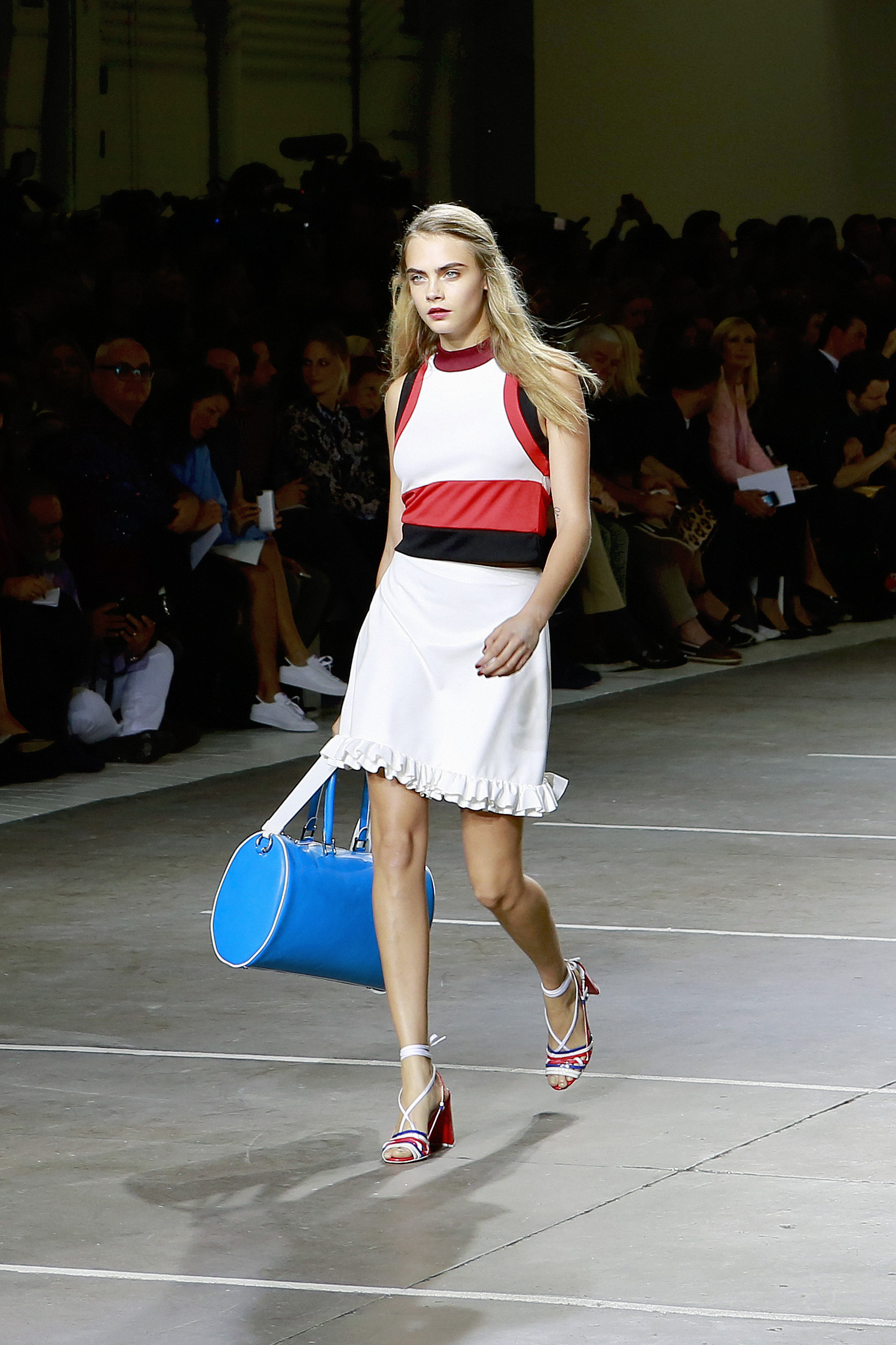
Delevingne at London Fashion Week in September 2014

Delevingne had her first modelling job at age ten in 2002, in an editorial for Vogue Italia. She worked in the industry for a year before booking a paying job and went through two seasons of castings before landing her first runway show; she was scouted by Burberry designer Christopher Bailey and made her first catwalk appearance at London Fashion Week 2011, for the Burberry Prorsum A/W collection.

While continuing with Burberry, she appeared in runway shows in Paris, Milan and New York, for all of the major fashion brands of the day. From then on, she was much sought-after, and formed what would become a long-lasting relationship with Chanel's Karl Lagerfeld.

In 2012, Delevingne was featured in the Victoria's Secret Fashion Show. In 2013, Delevingne took part in a Chanel show at Scotland's Linlithgow Palace, featuring a tartan collection designed by Lagerfeld and called "Paris-Édimbourg."

In 2013, Delevingne appeared in a collaboration between Katie Grand and Tod's and sang "I Want Candy"' in their mini-film Gang. Delevingne was also featured in Chanel's Cruise show in Singapore.

In 2015, Delevingne became more selective with the shows she appeared in. She attributed this to both her growing acting career and her desire not to see work as the sole marker of success.

Off the runway, Delevingne has made numerous commercials and appeared in product ads for Chanel, Dior, Marc Jacobs, Burberry,DKNY, Tag Heuer, Penshoppe, Pepe Jeans, Alexander Wang, YSL, and Mango, among others. In 2016, she became one of the faces of Rimmel. Delevingne's magazine covers include Vogue, V, British GQ, Vogue Paris, Elle UK, Elle Australia, The Wall Street Journal, Love, The Edit, and Glamour.

=== Acting ===
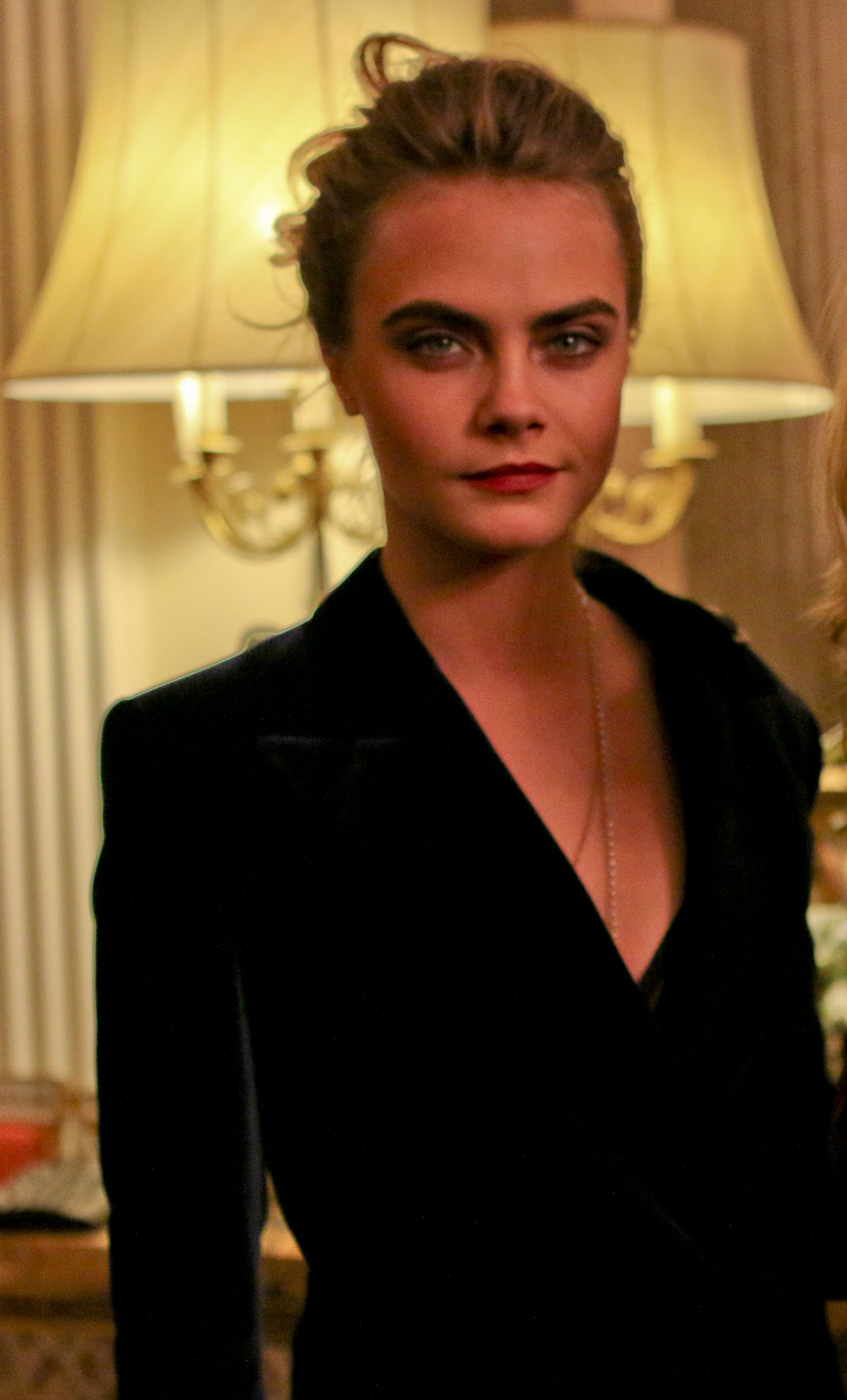
Delevingne in September 2014

Delevingne played her first film role as Princess Sorokina in the 2012 adaptation of Anna Karenina. In August 2013, Delevingne voiced a DJ of a pop radio station in the video game Grand Theft Auto V. Delevingne went on to play the part of Melanie in the British psychological thriller film The Face of an Angel. The film received mixed reviews, but some critics commended Delevingne's performance.

On 24 October 2014, she starred in a sketch for an annual 90-minute comedy TV event called The Feeling Nuts Comedy Night. A month later, she was featured in Die Antwoord's music video for their song "Ugly Boy". Then in December 2014, Delevingne starred in Reincarnation, a short film by Karl Lagerfeld for Chanel. In June 2014, Delevingne made her TV debut opposite veteran British actress Sylvia Syms in the final episode of Playhouse Presents. This was a series of self-contained TV plays, made by British broadcaster Sky Arts.

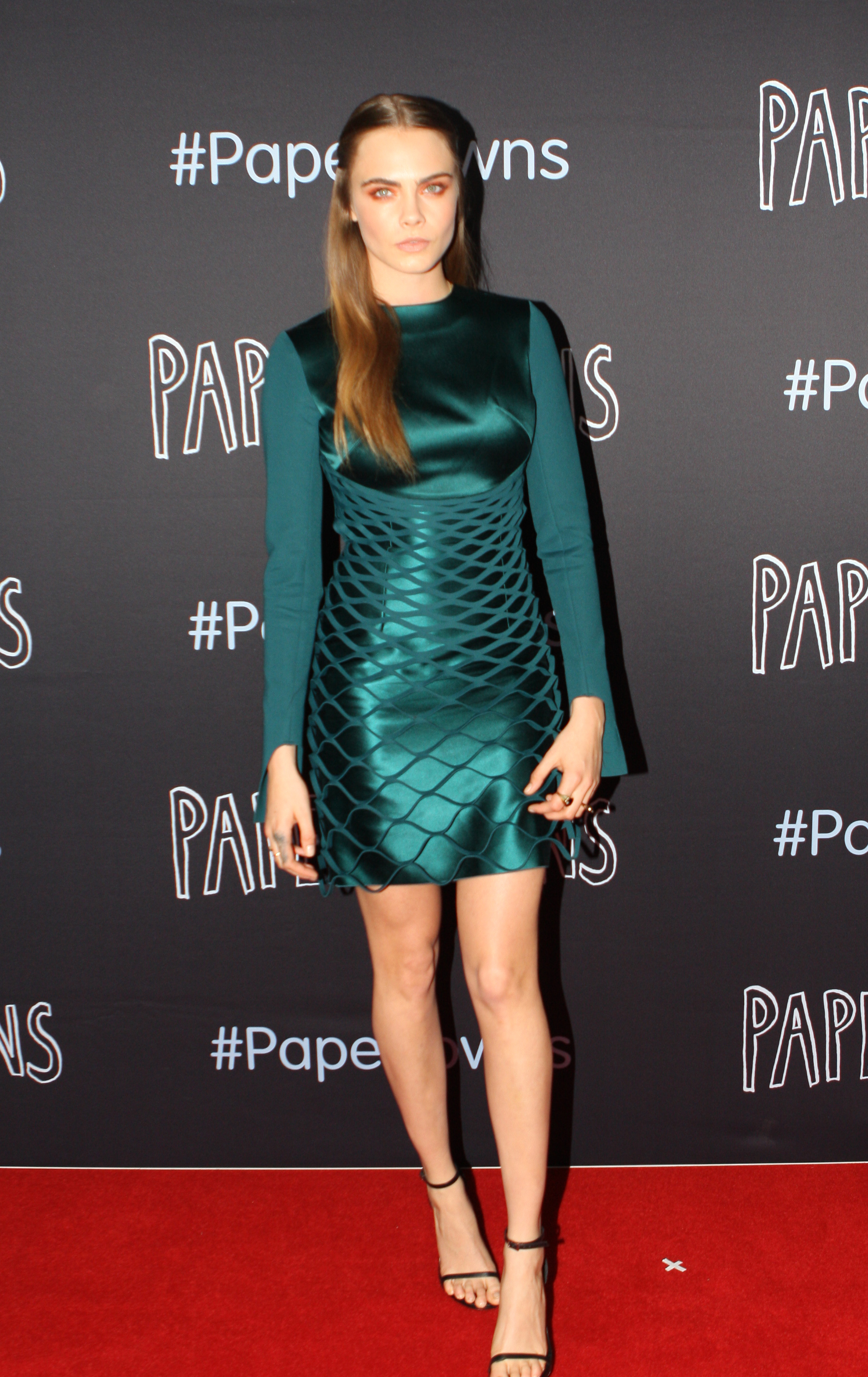
Delevingne at the premiere of Paper Towns in July 2015

In February 2015, Delevingne appeared in ASAP Ferg's music video for his song Dope Walk. Later in May 2015, she was also in Taylor Swift's star studded "Bad Blood" music video which went on to break Vevo's 24-hour viewing record, with 20.1 million views in its day of release. Delevingne co-starred in the adaptation of John Green's novel Paper Towns (2015) as Margo Roth Spiegelman. The film brought in $12,650,140 on the opening weekend in the US, which placed it 6th at the box office. Rotten Tomatoes' critical consensus reads, "Paper Towns isn't as deep or moving as it wants to be, yet it's still earnest, well-acted, and thoughtful enough to earn a place in the hearts of teen filmgoers of all ages." Of Delevingne's performance, Justin Chang of Variety called her "the real find of the film", suggesting that "on the evidence of her work here, this striking actress [sic] is here to stay".

Delevingne played a mermaid in the 2015 fantasy film Pan. In 2016, Delevingne co-starred as Enchantress, a villainess with magical abilities, in Suicide Squad, an action film based on the DC comic book series of the same name. The film was released to generally negative reviews, although it was a box office success. Delevingne's performance received mixed reviews from critics. The film Kids in Love, a British coming of age drama, was released in 2016. The cast includes many up and coming young actors, with Will Poulter and Alma Jodorowsky as lead roles alongside Sebastian de Souza and Delevingne who plays the role of Viola. Delevingne starred, alongside Dane DeHaan and Rihanna, in the Luc Besson film Valerian and the City of a Thousand Planets, an adaptation of the comic book series Valérian and Laureline. The film began shooting in December 2015, and was released in July 2017.

Delevingne plays Annetje in the period romance film Tulip Fever. She also plays the role of Kath Talent in the film London Fields, based on the 1989 novel of the same name by Martin Amis. The Amazon Prime Video fantasy steampunk series Carnival Row features Delevingne in the female lead role (opposite Orlando Bloom) as Vignette Stonemoss, a faerie war refugee. In 2022, she joined the cast of Only Murders in the Building for its second season.

=== Music ===
Delevingne sings and plays the drums and guitar. In 2011 and 2012, Delevingne wrote and recorded two albums under artist manager Simon Fuller and was offered a record deal but turned down the offer because her name would be changed. In 2013, she recorded an acoustic duet cover version of Sonnentanz with British soul and jazz singer-songwriter Will Heard.

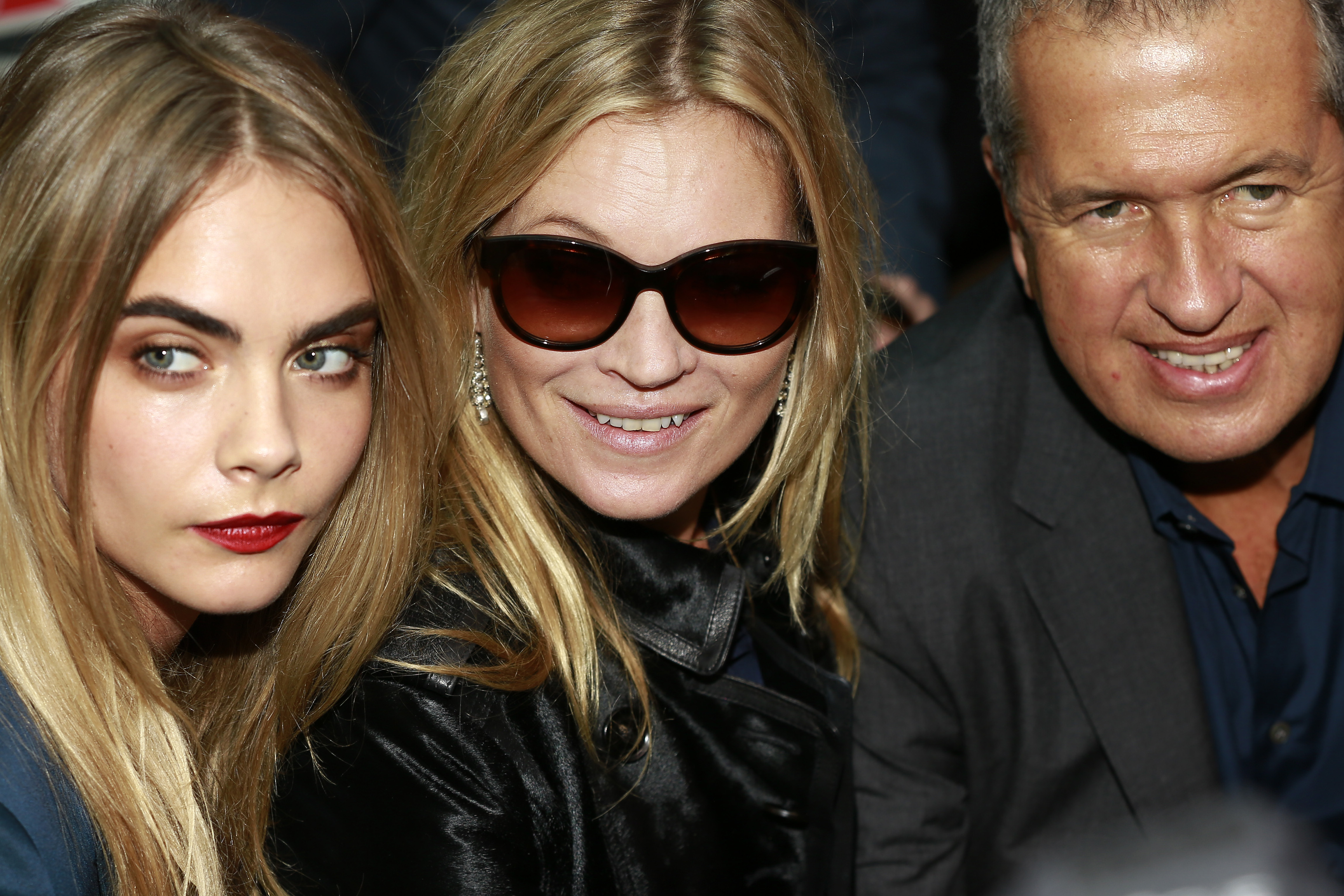
Delevingne with model Kate Moss (centre) and photographer Mario Testino (right) at a Burberry fashion show, 2014

Delevingne teamed up with Pharrell Williams to make the song "CC the World", which was used for the short Chanel film Reincarnation in which both Pharrell and Delevingne star. This was released to the public on 1 December 2014. The duo performed the song before a live audience for the Chanel show at the Park Avenue Armory in New York City in March 2015. On 28 July 2017, Delevingne released the music video for her song "I Feel Everything" from Valerian and the City of a Thousand Planets. Delevingne's background vocals are featured on the song "Pills" from the 2017 studio album, Masseduction, by American musician St. Vincent, whom Delevingne previously dated from 2014 to 2016. Her backing vocals are featured on the title track of Fiona Apple's 2020 album, Fetch the Bolt Cutters.

In September 2025, Delevingne's name was included on the lineup for the Primavera Sound 2026 music festival. In April 2026, Delevingne announced an upcoming eleven-date debut musical tour, which began in Berlin on June 1, 2026 and would end in Brooklyn on June 26, 2026. She would also perform at All Things Go Music Festival in New York City on September 25, 2026.

On May 29, 2026, Delevingne signed with Warner Records and released two new songs, "I Forgot" and "Out of My Head", accompanied by a short film directed by Jessica Lee Gagné, and it was announced that her debut album would be released in summer 2026. In August of that year, she announced that her debut album, entitled Not Normal, would be released on September 25, 2026. The album is to include the single "Need It" and the song "Crazy, Baby", which was released alongside its announcement.

=== Other ventures ===
In 2017, Delevingne made her debut as a novelist of young adult literature with her book Mirror, Mirror, which contains an LGBT theme and was co-written with British writer Rowan Coleman. In 2020, Delevingne and her sisters launched Della Vite, a line of vegan Prosecco. In December 2022, Delevingne featured in her series Planet Sex for BBC Three, shown over six episodes, exploring sexuality including her own, in various worldwide locations. From 11 March 2024, Delevigne will make her stage debut taking over as Sally Bowles in the West End musical Cabaret at the Kit Kat Club (Playhouse Theatre) opposite Luke Treadaway as the Emcee for 12 weeks.

Delevingne has designed two fashion collections for DKNY and Mulberry. Her DKNY capsule collection featured a variety of sporty street style items ranging from beanie hats to leather jackets. DKNY described the collection as "mostly unisex". The collection took approximately two years from the first announcement to when it was released on 15 October 2014. Delevingne has also designed four collections for Mulberry featuring rucksacks and handbags. The collection also consisted of purses, iPad sleeves, phone covers, zipped pouches, and passport holders. The fourth and latest collection was released 3 June 2015.

== Public image ==
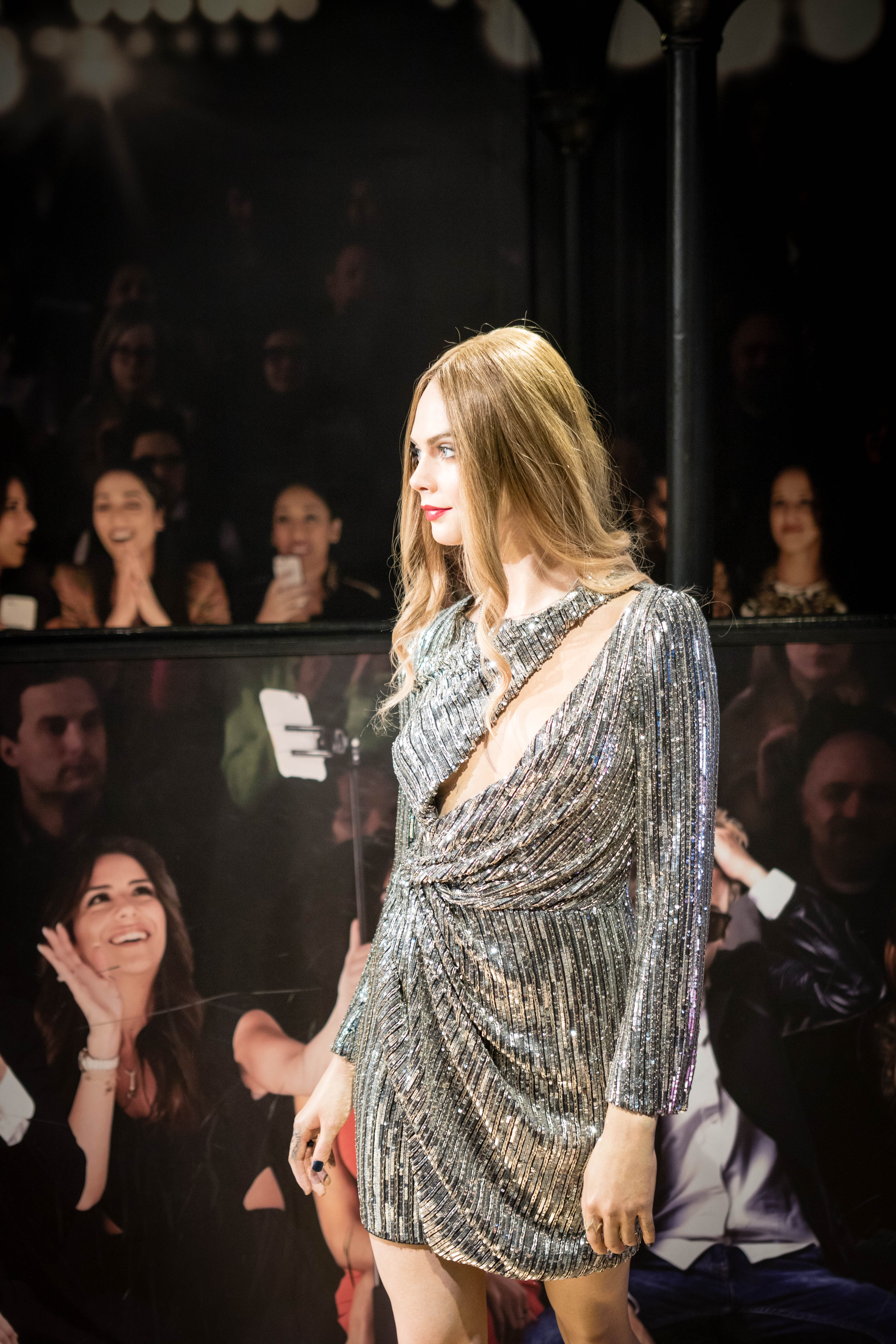
Waxwork of Delevingne on the catwalk at Madame Tussauds, London

Delevingne's naturally thick eyebrows are considered her signature look, and she has been credited with popularising bold eyebrows as a beauty trend of the 2010s. Delevingne was named by the Evening Standard as one of London's "1,000 Most Influential People of 2011", in the category Most Invited. In 2013, the Evening Standard also ranked her 20th on their "Power 1000" list "because of her domination of the catwalks at London Fashion Week and her huge social media following". The same year, Delevingne was the most googled fashion figure and the most re-blogged model on Tumblr.

In March 2014, Delevingne was included in The Sunday Times Magazine's "100 Makers of the 21st Century" list of influential British people. Later that year, she was ranked sixth on the "World's Highest-Paid Models" list by Forbes, earning an estimated US$3.5 million (£2.7 million). By 2015, she had moved up to second on this list, earning $9 million (£7 million).

Delevingne has appeared twice in categories run by AskMen, ranking at number 13 on their "Top 99 Most Desirable Women" list in 2014, and at number 40 on their "Crush List: Top 99 Women" in 2016. She posed nude in photoshoots for Esquire, Balmain and John Hardy brands.

Delevingne has been described as a nepo baby.

== Personal life ==
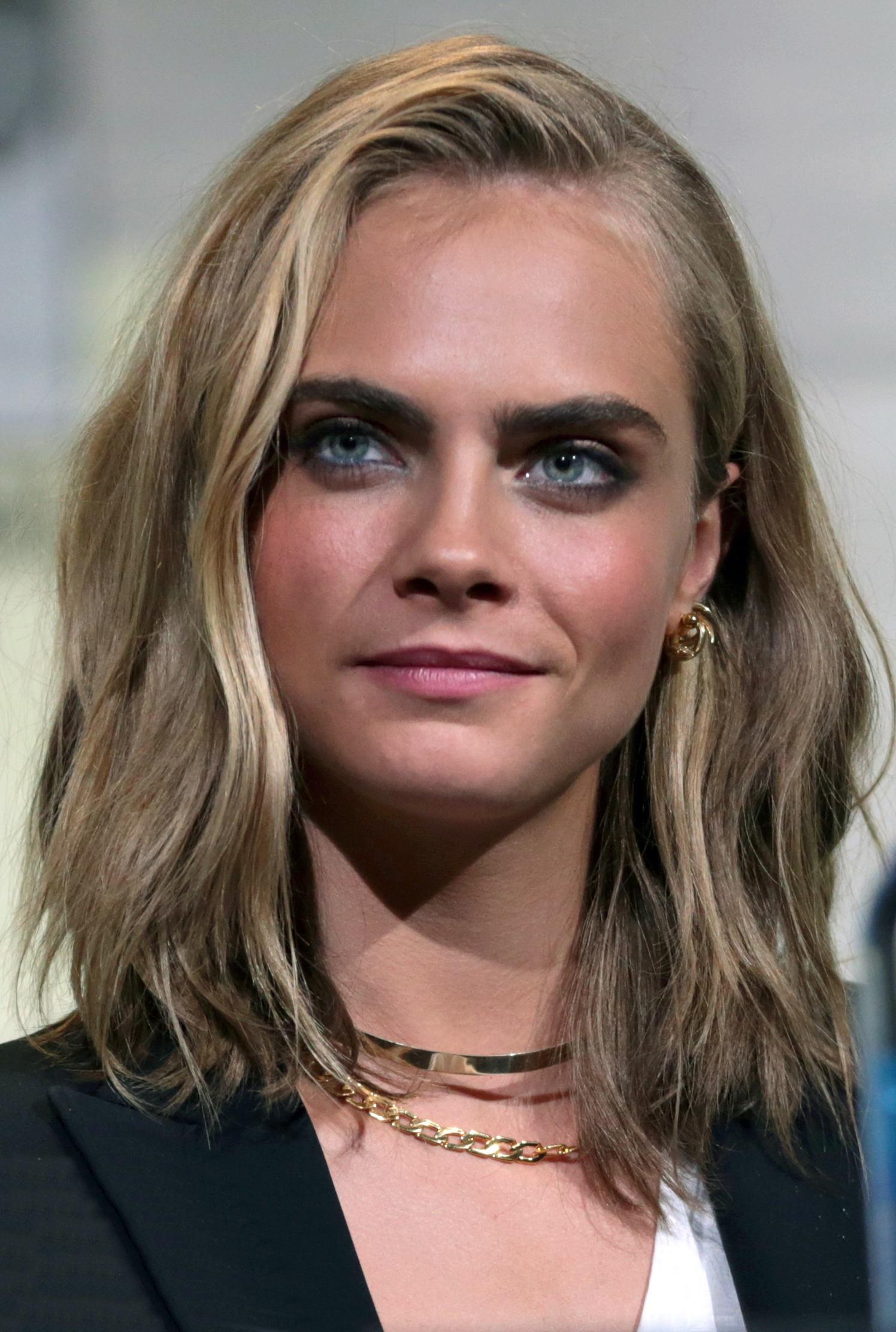
Delevingne at San Diego Comic Con in 2016

Delevingne is a lesbian, which she publicly revealed in 2026, after having previously identified as pansexual. She had previously identified as bisexual and spoken about overcoming shame surrounding her sexuality. In June 2015, she confirmed that she was in a relationship with American musician St. Vincent. They separated in September 2016. In May 2018, Delevingne came out as genderfluid. She uses she/her pronouns. In June 2019, she confirmed that she was in a relationship with actress and model Ashley Benson. In April 2020, the couple split after two years of dating. Delevingne has been dating musician Leah Mason, also known as Minke, since 2022. In June 2026, Delevingne revealed at The Louis Theroux Podcast that she was "entangled" with Amber Heard, her co-star in London Fields, following Heard's divorce from Johnny Depp.

Delevingne is a self-described animal lover. Following the killing of Cecil the lion in 2015, she auctioned off her personal TAG Heuer watch in aid of wildlife conservation, raising £18,600 for WildCRU. She founded EcoResolution, an environmental justice platform with Advaya and has given speeches about climate change and supported stronger environmental regulation. She supports making ecocide a crime at the International Criminal Court stating "mass damage and destruction of nature is called ecocide and it should be an international crime, just like genocide." In 2021, Delevingne joined the Rewriting Extinction campaign to fight the climate and biodiversity crisis through comics. She co-created at least one short story comic in The Most Important Comic Book on Earth: Stories to Save the World, which was released on 28 October 2021 by DK. She said about the campaign, "Through storytelling, community building and action we rewrite the cultural narratives driving extinction."

At the Women in the World summit in October 2015, Delevingne spoke about her battle with depression, which began at age 15, when she discovered her mother's drug addiction. The following year, she left school for six months and agreed to go on medication, which she said may have saved her life. In 2017, on This Morning, she revealed that she also has ADHD. In October 2017, Delevingne alleged that circa 2016, producer Harvey Weinstein sexually harassed her, attempted to kiss her without consent, and propositioned her for a threesome in a hotel room in exchange for a role. Despite declining, she was still cast in the film, but says she regretted it because his actions terrified her. The Weinstein Company produced the 2017 film Tulip Fever, which starred Delevingne. She also alleges that circa 2014, he told her she would never work as an actress in Hollywood because of her sexuality.

In a March 2023 interview with Vogue, Delevingne said that she had checked herself into rehab in late 2022 and entered a twelve-step program, and had been sober since then. Delevingne has several tattoos. Her first tattoo was a lion on her finger, representing her zodiac sign of Leo. She has a tattoo of her lucky number, the Roman numeral XII, on her side under her right arm, and "MADE IN ENGLAND" on the sole of her left foot. She has said that her most important tattoo is the elephant on her right arm, in memory of her late grandmother. Her initials "CJD" are on her hand. She also tattooed matching smiley-face "toemojis" with co-star Margot Robbie.

She is a supporter of Chelsea.

=== 2024 house fire ===
In the early hours of 15 March 2024, Delevingne's home in Studio City, Los Angeles, caught fire. Ninety-four firefighters from the city of Los Angeles responded to the call but the property was declared a total loss. A firefighter and a person who was in the house were injured, and Delevingne's two cats made it out alive; Delevingne was not at the mansion at the time of the fire. The following day, it was revealed that the cause of the fire was most likely "electrical".

== Filmography ==
=== Film ===
Year	Title	Role	Notes	Ref.
2012	Anna Karenina	Princess Sorokina		
2014	Reincarnation by Chanel	Naughty Barmaid; Empress Elisabeth of Austria	Short film	
2014	The Face of an Angel	Melanie		
2015	Paper Towns	Margo Roth Spiegelman		
2015	Pan	Mermaid		
2015	The 1989 World Tour Live	Herself	Cameo	
2016	Absolutely Fabulous: The Movie	Herself	Cameo	
2016	Kids in Love	Viola		
2016	Suicide Squad	June Moone / Enchantress		
2017	Valerian and the City of a Thousand Planets	Laureline		
2017	Tulip Fever	Annetje		
2018	London Fields	Kath Talent		
2018	Her Smell	Crassie Cassie		
2020	Life in a Year	Isabelle		
2020	Miss Americana	Herself	Cameo	
2022	Tell It Like a Woman	Validation		
2026	Club Kid	Sophie		
TBA	Arena †		Filming	
TBA	Non Compos Mentis †		Post-production	

=== Television ===
Year	Title	Role	Notes	Ref.
2014	Playhouse Presents	Chloe	Episode: "Timeless"	
2019	Running Wild with Bear Grylls	Herself	Celebrity appearance	
2019	RuPaul's Drag Race	Herself (guest judge)	Episode: "Monster Ball"	
2019–2023	Carnival Row	Vignette Stonemoss	Series regular	
2021	Friends: The Reunion	Herself	Television special	
2022	Only Murders in the Building	Alice Banks	Main (season 2)	
2022	Planet Sex with Cara Delevingne	Herself	Presenter; executive producer	
2022	Inside Amy Schumer		Episode: "Awwwww"	
2023–2024	Futurama	Owl / herself (voice)	4 episodes (season 8-9)	
2023–2024	American Horror Story: Delicate	Ivy Ehrenreich	Main role	
2025	Match Game	Herself (panelist)	Premiere episode of revival	

=== Theatre ===
Year	Title	Role	Venue	Ref.
2024	Cabaret	Sally Bowles	Kit Kat Club at the Playhouse Theatre	

=== Web ===
Year	Title	Role	Notes	Ref.
2021	Lady Parts	Herself	Episode: "The Joy of Sex"	

=== Music videos ===
==== As actor ====
Year	Title	Artist(s)	Ref.
2010	"You Can Dance"	Bryan Ferry	
2010	"Shameless"	Bryan Ferry	
2013	"Facemelt" (Hunger TV Version)	Rita Ora	
2013	"Sonnentanz"	Will Heard and herself	
2014	"Ugly Boy"	Die Antwoord	
2015	"Dope Walk"	ASAP Ferg	
2015	"Bad Blood"	Taylor Swift featuring Kendrick Lamar	
2015	"Nothing Came to Me"	Donnie Trumpet & the Social Experiment	
2017	"I Feel Everything"	Herself	
2018	"River Water"	The Spencer Lee Band	
2019	"Rudeboy Lovesong"	Shy FX featuring Herself and Sweetie Irie	
2019	"Nightmare"	Halsey	
2019	"Can't Wait"	The Akergirls	
2020	"Imagine"	Gal Gadot & Friends	
2021	"Rogue" (Live)	Marieme and herself	
2021	"Woman" (Live)	Marieme and herself	
2026	"I Forgot" / "Out of My Head"	Herself	
2026	"Crazy, Baby"	Herself	
2026	"Patient Zero"	Taylor Swift	

==== As director ====
Year	Title	Artist(s)	Ref.
2020	"Crying in the Mirror"	Rainford	
2023	"Pretty Girls"	Reneé Rapp	

=== Video game ===
Year	Title	Role	Notes	Ref.
2013	Grand Theft Auto V	DJ Cara	Voice	
2013	Grand Theft Auto Online	DJ Cara	Voice	

== Discography ==
Title	Year	Other artist(s)	Album
"Live and Let Die"	2009	Kate Banks, Lucy Waterhouse, Millie Patterson, Rosa Boxall, Sophie Rasbash, Stevie-lee Bennett	Bedales Rock Show 2009
"Sonnentanz"	2013	Will Heard	None
"I Want Candy"	2013	None	Gang
"CC the World"	2014	Pharrell Williams	Reincarnation
"I Feel Everything"	2017	None	Valerian and the City of a Thousand Planets
"Pills"	2017	St. Vincent	Masseduction
"Secret Life of Tigers"	2017	N.E.R.D.	No One Ever Really Dies
"Rudeboy Lovesong"	2019	Shy FX, Sweetie Irie	Raggamuffin Soundtape
"Breathe"	2019	Elisabeth Moss, Agyness Deyn, Gayle Rankin, Ashley Benson, Dylan Gelula, Amber Heard	Her Smell
"Can't Wait"	2019	Ashley Benson, Dylan Gelula	Her Smell
"Sex Drive"	2019	Machine Gun Kelly	Hotel Diablo
"Fetch the Bolt Cutters"	2020	Fiona Apple	Fetch the Bolt Cutters
"I Forgot"	2026	None	Not Normal
"Out of My Head"	2026	None	Not Normal
"Need It"	2026	None	Not Normal

== Books ==
- Delevingne, Cara; Coleman, Rowan (2017). Mirror, Mirror. London: Harper. ISBN 9780062791566. OCLC 983382417. Novel.
