= Lionel Delevingne =

American photojournalist

- Born: France
- Occupations: Author, speaker, photojournalist
- Known for: Photography of social movements

Lionel Delevingne (born in France) is an author, journalist, and photojournalist who has lived in the United States since 1975. According to Véronique Prévost of Figaro/Journal Français, "Delevingne is beholden to the lineage of great picture journalists, and his talent, if not his inspiration, makes you think of the master of the genre, Cartier-Bresson."

Delevingne is particularly known for his photographs of the anti-nuclear power/safe energy movement, chronicling the Seabrook nuclear power plant occupations in the 1970s, as well as Three Mile Island, Chernobyl, and Fukushima. He has won a number of photography awards, and his work has been featured on covers including New Age, Mother Jones, Washington Post Magazine, and Irish Times. Many of his photos have been published in books about the environment and the safe energy movement, and he has co-authored several books. In 2014, he authored the book To the Village Square: From Montague to Fukushima, 1975-2014 on Nouveau Monde Press in collaboration with Prospecta Press. Current photographs are featured in the December 2019 issue of Orion Magazine.

See images on instagram.

== Early life ==
Lionel Delevingne was born and raised in France. He studied education at Ecole Normale d'instituteurs d'Auteuil (ENI Paris), before moving permanently to the United States in 1975. He founded the publishing company Delevingne & Associates in 1980.

== Career ==
=== 1970s: Environmental photos ===
After settling in Northampton, Massachusetts, and working as a writer/photographer for publications such as the Valley Advocate, and In These Times

"Back in the Seventies, internet was not even a dream and the news took often a long time to travel across the Atlantic. Thanks to the beautiful photographic essays by Lionel Delevingne published in Le Sauvage, one of the first ecological magazines in France, we became aware about the growing antinuclear movement in the USA."
— French journalist Laurent Samuel

Lionel Delevingne became particularly known for his documentary photographs of the anti-nuclear power/safe energy movement. He provided extensive coverage of the Clamshell Alliance occupations of the Seabrook nuclear power plant site in the 1970s, and also chronicled the aftermath of destruction and protest following major accidents at Three Mile Island in the United States, Chernobyl, Ukraine, and Fukushima, Japan. He published his photos both internationally and in the United States, including in Le Sauvage, one of the first ecological magazines in France.

Many of his photos have been published in books about the safe energy movement, including No Nukes by Anna Gyorgy (South End Press, 1979), and in his 2014 book To The Village Square. A photo essay of his work on Chernobyl appeared on the website of Mother Jones in 2009. According to Veronique Prevost of Figaro/Journal Francais, "Delevingne is beholden to the lineage of great picture journalists, and his talent, if not his inspiration, makes you think of the master of the genre, Cartier-Bresson."

=== 1980s-2000s: Editorial clients ===
Delevingne travelled extensively beyond his New England home to locations such as Greenland, Australia and the Amazon, as well as numerous European countries. He went on to co-author several books. The first was Northampton: Reflections on Paradise in 1988, followed shortly after by Franco-American Viewpoints.

He was a regular contributor to the New York Times and others such as Business Week, Vanity Fair, Time, Die Zeit, Figaro Magazine, Le Sauvage, Boston Globe Magazine, Newsweek, Time, Philadelphia Inquirer Magazine, US News & World Report, In These Times, Yankee Magazine, Island Magazine, Caribbean Travel, Friends of The Earth/Not Man Apart, New Times, The Village Voice, Colliers Encyclopedia, Washington Post Magazine, New Age, East West Journal, Mother Jones, New York Times Travel, Irish Times Sunday Magazine, New England Monthly, Seven Days, Self Care, Nursing Life, Fresh Ink, Jerusalem Post, Newsweek, Buzz Worm, and Police Magazine.

He produced book jacket cover art and Illustrations for Simon & Schuster; Macmillan; Colliers Encyclopedia, Funk and Wagnalls New World Encyclopedia, Pantheon; Atlantic Little Brown; Random House; Prentice-Hall; Houghton-Mifflin; Oklahoma University Press; Addison Wesley; Island Press; University of California Press; Seven Stories Press; University of Oklahoma Press; and many others.

And was a principal photographer for books/monographs by Judith Souweine, Mainstreaming NAYEC; Anna Gyorgy, et al., No Nukes, South End Press; Greg Speeter, Power: A repossession Manual; Robbie Gordon, We Interrupt this Program, CITP; Robert Neale, Origami St. Martin Press, National Freeze Campaign Brochure.

=== 2012-14: Drylands and To the Village Square ===
In 2012, Lionel Delevingne and Steve Turner co-authored the Drylands, a Rural American Saga, published by Nebraska University Press.

In 2014 he authored the book To the Village Square: From Montague to Fukushima, 1975-2014 on Nouveau Monde Press. Mark Kramer, author and the former founding director of the Nieman Program's class on Narrative Journalism at Harvard, called the book "exquisite," stating "To open it is to participate, comprehend and appreciate the extensive, heroic, multi-decade struggle against global damage by nuclear power plants. It celebrates the many concerned and sensible citizens who have built successful, continuing and urgent movements against the high-handed and short-sighted private developers of these risky plants."

== Grants, awards ==
Throughout his career Delevingne has received a number of grants, notably from the Ministry of Foreign Affairs and International Development (France) from the French Minister of Culture, as well as the Massachusetts Foundation for the Humanities and Public Policy. He has also won achievement awards from the Council for the Advancement (CASE) and Support of Education and Art Direction Magazine.

== Presentations, lectures ==
The following is an incomplete list of presentations and lectures by Delevingne:

- "When Activism Drives Art, and Art Drives Activism", St. Michael's College, McCarthy Arts Center, Burlington, VT, discussion on activism and art with guest panelists Lionel Delevingne, Paul Gunter, Jay Gustaferro, Aileen Smith
- "Le Mois de la Photo" - Musée National d'Art Moderne, Paris
- "Ten French Photographers" - Arles Festival, France,
- "French Contemporary Photography" - New York University, New York
- "To The Village Square: An Experiment in American Democracy (with Anna Gyorgy)" - University of Massachusetts at Amherst; Université D'Angers/Colloque Internationale de la Francophonie; Hampshire College, Amherst, Massachusetts; Mt. Holyoke College, South Hadley, Massachusetts; Smith College, Northampton, Massachusetts; Association of Picture Professionals, Boston, Massachusetts; Currier Museum, New Hampshire University; World Congress of French Studies (CIEF), Strasbourg, France; American International College; Emma Willard School

== Collections, solo exhibitions ==
His work is in the permanent collections of notable institutions including Fnac Galleries in Paris, France, Musee Nicephore Niepce in Chalon sur Saône, SUNY Arts Center in Albany, New York, the Bibliotheque Nationale in Paris, Lowell City Library in Lowell, Massachusetts, the Smith College Art Museum and Forbes Library in Northampton, Massachusetts. The Dubois Library Special Collections at the University of Massachusetts in Amherst has an extensive archive of his photographs.

The following is a list of Delevingne's solo exhibitions:

- 2020: “From Paris to Stockbridge, via Fukushima”, Stockbridge Station Gallery, Stockbridge, MA
- 2018: "To the Village Square: From Montague to Fukushima, 1975-2014", St. Michael's College, McCarthy Art Gallery, Burlington, VT with guest panel discussion
- 2017: "To the Village Square", Northeastern University, Massachusetts
- 2012: "To the Village Square, An Experiment in American Democracy", Eighth Annual Colloquium, Dubois Library, Special Collections, University of Massachusetts at Amherst, January–October, 2012
- 2013: "Drylands, a Rural American Saga": Elusie Gallery, Easthampton, MA, 2013
- 1999: "Northampton, Reflections on Paradise", Northampton Center for the Arts, MA
- 1998: "Northampton, Reflections on Paradise", Forbes Library, Northampton, MA
- 1993: "Ein Pariser in Amerika": Institut Francais, Berlin, Germany
- 1992/1995: "Les Francos, Nos Cousins d’Amérique", traveling solo-exhibition. Venues: FNAC Galleries – Montparnasse, Strasbourg, Saint Etienne, Bruxelles, Dijon, Orleans, Angers, Pau; Angers; World Francophone Summit in Strasbourg; ENS/Affaires Culturelles, Lyon, France FNAC.
- 1990: "Lionel Delevingne Photographer" (a retrospective): Springfield Technical Community College, Springfield, MA
- 1984-1988: "Franco American Viewpoints", traveling solo-exhibition, Smith College, Hillyer Gallery, Northampton, MA; Boston Public Library, MA; Massachusetts and New Hampshire State-wide Tour, Wistariahurst Museum, Holyoke, MA; Fishburn Gallery, Northfield Mount Hermon School, MA; Jack Kerouac Library, Quebec, Canada

External image
- "Glory Glory" Photo Gallery (11 photos)

- 1980-87: "Glory, Glory" (study of patriotism in the U.S.): State University of New York at Albany, Fine Arts Center; Camerawork, San Francisco; French Library, Boston; FNAC International tour (Nice, Paris, Lille, and Grenoble, France, Brussels, Belgium); French Institute, New York; Columbia University, New York.
- 1980: "The Anti-Nuclear Family", Forbes Library, Amherst, MA

== Reviews ==
The New York Times; Photo Magazine; Digraphe, Paris; Tag Spiegel, Berlin; Neus Deutschland, Berlin; Berliner Morgen Post, Berlin; Village Voice; Photo Revue; Boston Globe; Photo District News; Boston Phoenix; Albany Times Union; l' Almanach de la Photo, Paris Fr; Springfield Daily News; The Journal of Photography in New England; Valley Advocate; Daily Hampshire Gazette; Seattle Times; Greenfield Recorder; Providence Sunday Journal Arts and Travel; Transcript Telegram; The French Review of Photography "Le Photographe"; The Daily News; Journal Francais d'Amerique; Berkshire Courier; Berkshire Record; The Berkshire Edge; BoingBoing; Foreword Reviews; Gloucester Times; The Sound; JNE; Lenscratch; WAMC Book Picks; and The Spokesman Review, Seattle, WA, among others.

Television and Radio Interviews:

WFCR, Amherst, MA; Channel 8 NH; Radio Blue, Nice, France; France Inter, Paris; WFUV, New York, NY; WAMC/NPR Albany; WGBY/PBS, Springfield; WHMP, Northampton; WMUA, Amherst; The Burt Cohen Show.

Magazine Features:

Orion Magazine December 2019 issue, Prime Magazine

== Publishing history ==
Books authored or co-authored by Delevingne
Yr	Release title	Authors	Publishing
1988	Northampton: Reflections on Paradise	Lionel Delevingne, Faye S. Frail	Northampton, Mass.: Nouveau Monde Press
1988	Franco-American Viewpoints	Lionel Delevingne, Eloise A. Briere, Nicole Vaget	Northampton, Mass.: Nouveau Monde Press/Wistariahurst Museum, Holyoke, Mass
2012	Drylands, A Rural American Saga	Lionel Delevingne, Steve Turner	Lincoln, Neb.: Nebraska University Press
2014	To the Village Square: From Montague to Fukushima, 1975-2014	Lionel Delevingne	Nouveau Monde Press, in conjunction with Prospecta Press, Weston, CT

== See also ==
- Photojournalism
