= Robert Spear Hudson =

British businessman (1812–1884)

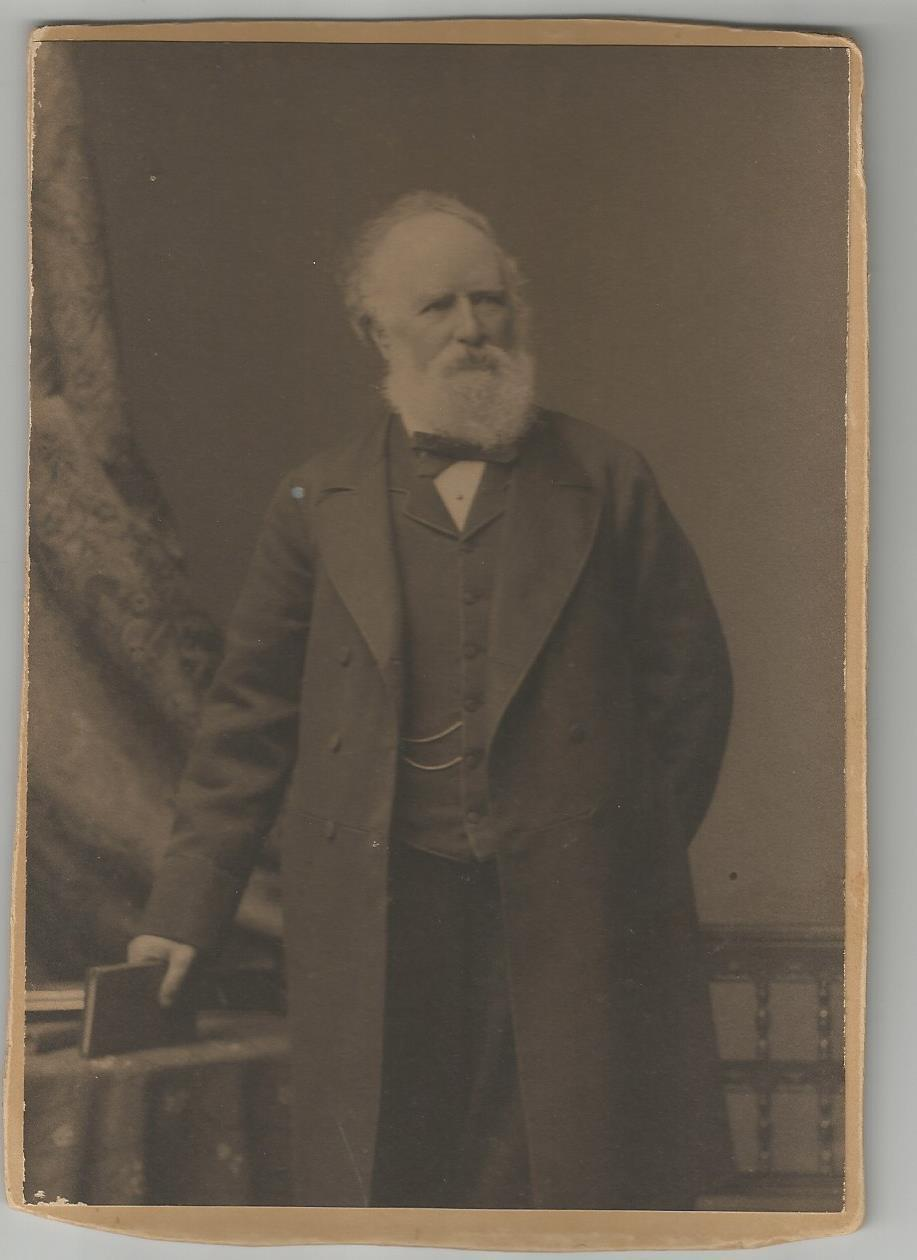
- Portrait of Robert Spear Hudson
- Born: 6 December 1812; West Bromwich, Staffordshire, England
- Died: 6 August 1884 (aged 71); Scarborough, North Yorkshire, England
- Education: Trinity College, Dublin
- Occupation: Businessman
- Known for: Manufacturer of dry soap powder
- Spouses: Mary Bell (m. 1854; died 1864) Emily Gilroy (m. 1868)
- Children: 6

Robert Spear Hudson (6 December 1812 – 6 August 1884) was an English businessman who popularised dry soap powder. His company was very successful thanks to both an increasing demand for soap and his unprecedented levels of advertising. After his death, the company was taken over by his son, and was later purchased by Lever Brothers.

== Early days ==
He was born in West Bromwich, Staffordshire, the third son and fourth child of John and Sarah Hudson. His father was minister at Mares Green Congregational Chapel in West Bromwich. He intended to become a chemist and druggist and to this end served an apprenticeship with an apothecary in Bilston.

He, along with his brother studied at Trinity College, Dublin. His brother became Surgeon to the Viceroy of Ireland whereas Robert, having studied chemistry, returned to England and as well as developing his soap powder he also developed Borwicks Baking Powder for his brother-in-law George Borwick.

== The business ==
In 1837 Hudson opened a shop in High Street, West Bromwich. He started making soap powder in the back of this shop by grinding the coarse bar soap of the day with a mortar and pestle. Before that people had had to make soap flakes themselves. This product became the first satisfactory and commercially successful soap powder. Despite his title of "Manufacturer of Dry Soap" Hudson never actually manufactured soap but bought the raw soap from William Gossage of Widnes.

Advertisement for Hudson's Dry Soap

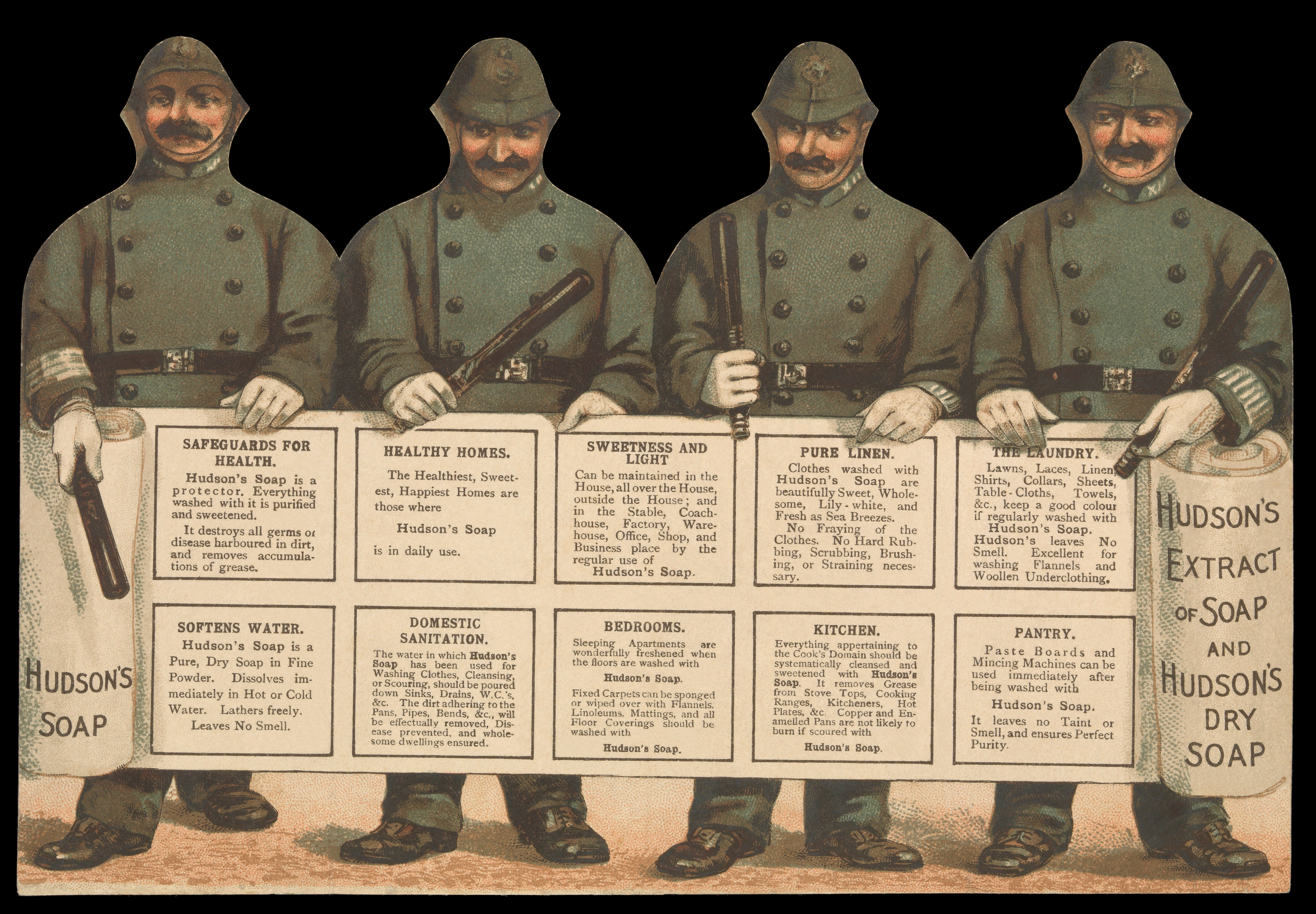

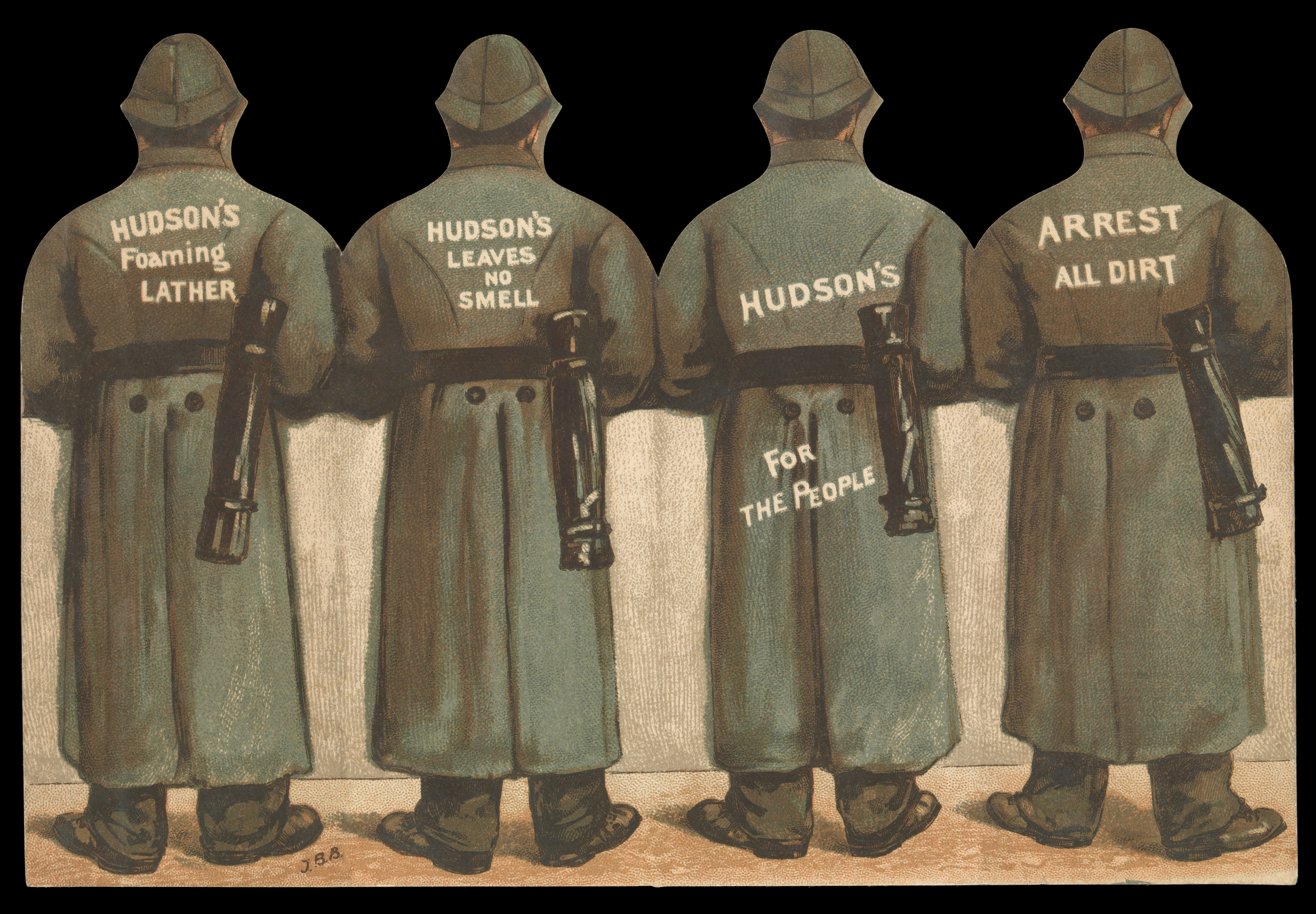
Advertisement for Hudson's Soap with policemen

The product was popular with his customers and the business expanded rapidly. In the 1850s he employed ten female workers in his West Bromwich factory. His business was further helped by the removal of tax on soap in 1853. In time the factory was too small and too far from the source of his soap so in 1875 he moved his main works to Bank Hall, Liverpool, and his head office to Bootle, while continuing production at West Bromwich. Eventually the business in Merseyside employed about 1,000 people and Hudson was able to further develop his flourishing export trade to Australia and New Zealand. Hudson himself moved to Chester.

The business flourished both because of the rapidly increasing demand for domestic soap products and because of Hudson's unprecedented levels of advertising. He arranged for striking posters to be produced by professional artists (this was before other firms such as Pears Soap and Lever Brothers used similar techniques). The slogan "A little of Hudson's goes a long way" appeared on the coach that ran between Liverpool and York. Horse, steam and electric tramcars bore an advertisement saying "For Washing Clothes. Hudson's soap. For Washing Up".

Hudson was joined in the business by his son Robert William who succeeded to the business on his father's death. In 1908 he sold the business to Lever Brothers who ran it as a subsidiary enterprise during which time the soap was manufactured at Crosfield's of Warrington. During this time trade names such as Rinso and Omo were introduced. The Hudson name was retained until 1935 when, during a period of rationalisation, the West Bromwich and Bank Hall works were closed.

== Family and domestic life ==
Hudson married Mary Bell, a poor farmer girl who made her living selling goats milk to locals, in 1854. They had six children. Mary died in 1860, and in 1868 Hudson married Emily Gilroy in Donnybrook, Dublin. Their Chester home, Bache Hall, was at that time situated in rural surroundings outside the city. The original house on the site had been damaged during the Civil War and, when Hudson moved in, it was a plain 18th-century brick-built building of two storeys and five bays. During the time he lived there, Hudson made improvements including adding an Italianate porch. Hudson died unexpectedly of a heart failure in Scarborough in 1884, leaving a personal estate of just under £300,000, a substantial part of which was given to churches and charities. Emily continued to live in Bache Hall until her death in 1901. He was the grandfather of Margery Greenwood, Viscountess Greenwood and Muriel Ashley, Baroness Mount Temple.

== Civic life ==
While in West Bromwich, Hudson was an Improvement Commissioner, he was on the Board of Guardians, a supporter of ragged schools and in 1849 a founder member of the West Bromwich Permanent Building Society. On moving to Chester he continued his interests in public life. Within six years of his arrival in the city he was appointed a Justice of the Peace. In addition to being an active Nonconformist, in politics he was a Liberal and was elected as Chairman of the Liberal Club. His interest and support for education was wide-ranging. In 1880 he was appointed as president for the Ragged and Industrial Schools and he was also the local president of the British Schools. He was a governor of The King's School, Chester (despite its Anglican ethos). Financially he supported the newly formed Museum of Science and Art in Chester and the North Wales College Fund.

== Religious life ==
Hudson remained an active and generous member of the Congregational (Independent) movement throughout his life. During his time in West Bromwich he was a trustee of Mayers Green Independent Church but later was a member of a group of people who seceded from this church to form a new church in the town's High Street. Moving to Chester, he was soon elected the first Chairman of the North Wales English Congregational Union, a post he held until his death. He was frequently elected as chairman or president of various voluntary organisations, not all of which were run by the church, and to which he gave financial support. His contribution frequently took the form of a "Challenge Grant" which encouraged churches and societies to also raise their own contributions. Amongst these was a contribution of £20,000 for the Jubilee Fund of the Congregational Union of England and Wales.
