= John Butcher, 1st Baron Danesfort =

British barrister and politician

The Right Honourable The Lord Danesfort KC
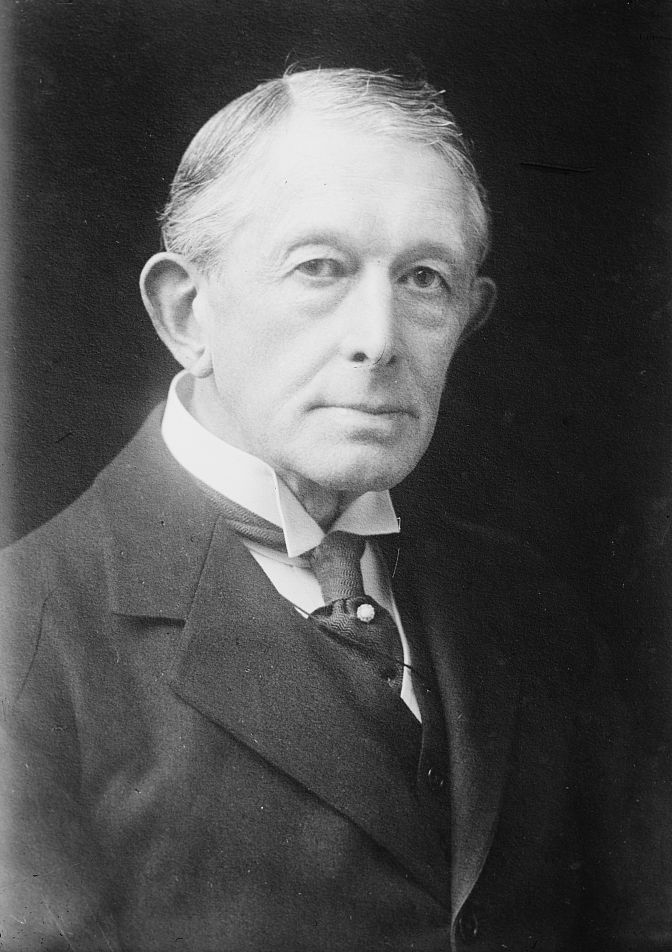
- John Butcher, 1st Baron Danesfort

Member of Parliament for York
- In office 10 January 1910 – 16 November 1923 Serving with Arnold Stephenson Rowntree (1910–1918)
- Preceded by: Hamar Greenwood; Denison Faber
- Succeeded by: John Marriott
- In office 26 July 1892 – 8 February 1906 Serving with Frank Lockwood (1892–1897); Lord Charles Beresford (1898–1900); Denison Faber (1900–1906)
- Preceded by: Alfred Pease; Frank Lockwood
- Succeeded by: Hamar Greenwood; Denison Faber

Personal details
- Born: 15 November 1853
- Died: 30 June 1935 (aged 81)
- Party: Conservative

John George Butcher, 1st Baron Danesfort, KC (15 November 1853 – 30 June 1935), known as Sir John Butcher, Bt, between 1918 and 1924, was a British barrister and Conservative Party politician.

== Background and education ==
Butcher was the second son of the Most Reverend Samuel Butcher, Bishop of Meath, the grandson of Vice-Admiral Samuel Butcher (1770–1849), and the younger brother of Samuel Henry Butcher. His mother was Mary, daughter of John Leahy. He was educated at Marlborough College and Trinity College, Cambridge, and was called to the Bar, Lincoln's Inn, in 1878.

== Political career ==
Butcher was Member of Parliament for York from 1892 to 1906 and from 1910 to 1923, in 1918 becoming the first Member of Parliament for York to be the sole parliamentary representative, as the constituency had previously had two MPs. He was made a Queen's Counsel in 1897, awarded the honorary freedom of the City of York in 1906 and created a baronet, of Danesfort in the County of Kerry, in 1918. In 1924 he was further honoured when he was elevated to the peerage as Baron Danesfort, of Danesfort in the County of Kerry.

== Personal life ==
Lord Danesfort married Alice Mary Gordon, author and domestic electrical pioneer, daughter of J. E. L. Brandreth, and widow of J.E.H. Gordon in 1898. There were no children from the marriage, but three step children from her previous marriage. Alice, Lady Danesfort died on 18 June 1929. Lord Danesfort survived her by six years and died in June 1935, aged 81, at which time the baronetcy and barony became extinct.

Parliament of the United Kingdom
Preceded by Alfred Pease; Frank Lockwood	Member of Parliament for York; 1892–1906; With: Frank Lockwood 1892–1898; Lord Charles Beresford 1898–1900; Denison Faber 1900–1906	Succeeded by Denison Faber; Hamar Greenwood
Preceded by Denison Faber; Hamar Greenwood	Member of Parliament for York; January 1910 – 1923; With: Arnold Stephenson Rowntree 1906–1918	Succeeded by Sir John Marriott
Baronetage of the United Kingdom
New creation	Baronet (of Danesfort, Kerry); 1918–1935	Extinct
Peerage of the United Kingdom
New creation	Baron Danesfort; 1924–1935	Extinct
