= Margery Greenwood, Viscountess Greenwood =

British aristocrat

The Right Honourable The Viscountess Greenwood DBE OStJ
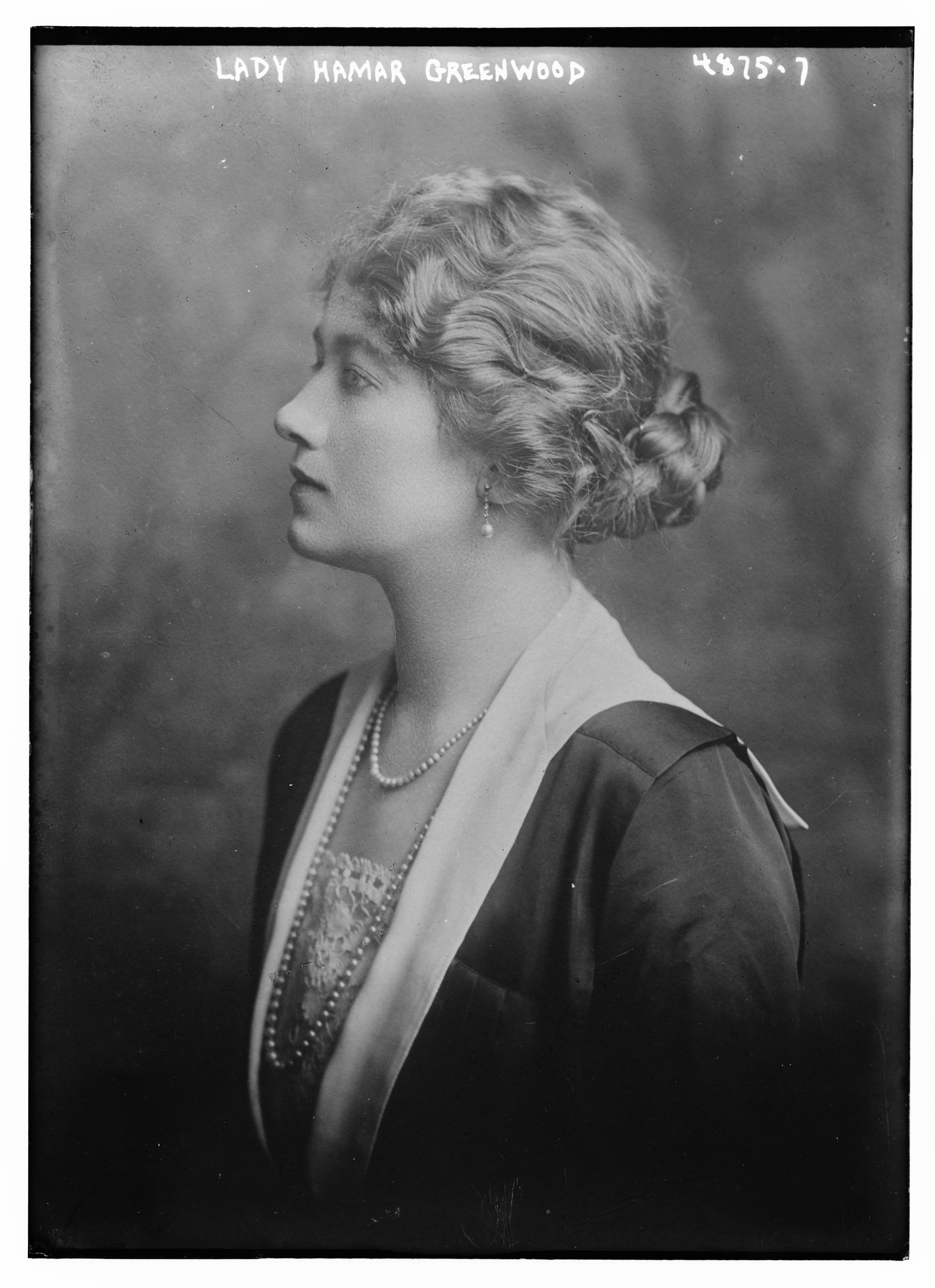
- Lady Greenwood in 1918

Personal details
- Born: Margery Spencer; 20 December 1886 Sapiston, West Suffolk, England
- Died: 24 April 1968 (aged 81) London, England
- Spouse: Hamar Greenwood, 1st Viscount Greenwood
- Children: Angela Delevingne; David Greenwood, 2nd Viscount Greenwood; Michael Greenwood, 3rd Viscount Greenwood
- Parent(s): Walter Spencer; Anne Hudson

Margery Greenwood, Viscountess Greenwood DBE OStJ (née Spencer; 20 December 1886 – 24 April 1968), known as Margo Greenwood, was a British aristocrat and the wife of Hamar Greenwood, 1st Viscount Greenwood. Very politically active, she was known to frequent meetings of parliament in the House of Commons and took an active role in her husband's constituencies while he sat in Parliament for York. She also notably had an affair with Lloyd George.

== Biography ==
Lady Greenwood was born Margery Spencer on 20 December 1886 in Sapiston, the daughter of Rev. Walter Spencer of Fownhope Court, Herefordshire and Anne Elizabeth Hudson of Bache Hall. Her maternal grandfather was soap manufacturer Robert Spear Hudson. She had two brothers, Robert and Geoffrey, and two sisters, Olive and Muriel.The Toronto World described her as being from "an ancient, dignified, and not impoverished family".

Lady Greenwood was educated at fashionable girls' schools in Eversley and Folkestone before attending a finishing school in Switzerland. While in Switzerland, she became fluent in French, an accomplished equestrian, and studied painting and sculpture. She would spend summers at her family's villa in Sanremo, where she became proficient in Italian. During her school days, she was described as being "ambitious" and having a "decidedly independent mind".

On 23 May 1911, she married Hamar Greenwood, a Canadian-British politician and lawyer who sat as a Member of Parliament for Sunderland, in a ceremony at St Margaret's, Westminster. The aisles were lined with troopers from the Canadian Squadron of King Edward's Horse. The wedding festivities were attended by many political leaders including H. H. Asquith, Sir Harry Verney, 4th Baronet, Wilfrid Laurier, Joseph Ward, Annie Botha, David Lloyd George, John Burns, Herbert Samuel, 1st Viscount Samuel, Robert Reid, 1st Earl Loreburn, Lewis Harcourt, 1st Viscount Harcourt, Walter Runciman, 1st Viscount Runciman of Doxford, Donald Smith, 1st Baron Strathcona and Mount Royal, Sir Charles Rose, 1st Baronet, John Redmond, Leo Amery, and Wilfrid Ashley. They honeymooned in Ireland, where they visited some of her McGillicuddy relatives. The Greenwoods had four children: Angela Margo Hamar Greenwood, David Henry Hamar Greenwood, Deborah Hamar Greenwood, and Michael Henry Hamar Greenwood.

She was extremely interested in politics, so much so that, during World War I, her husband claimed that she "knows every Member of the House of Commons, which she attends regularly". The gossip journalist Amy Stuart Menzies wrote that "she used to sit night after night in the Gallery of the House watching her husband anxiously." She travelled with her husband extensively, and took an active role in several of his constituencies. Attracted to political power, she had an affair with Lloyd George. In the early 1920s, she lived in Ireland while her husband served as Chief Secretary for Ireland.

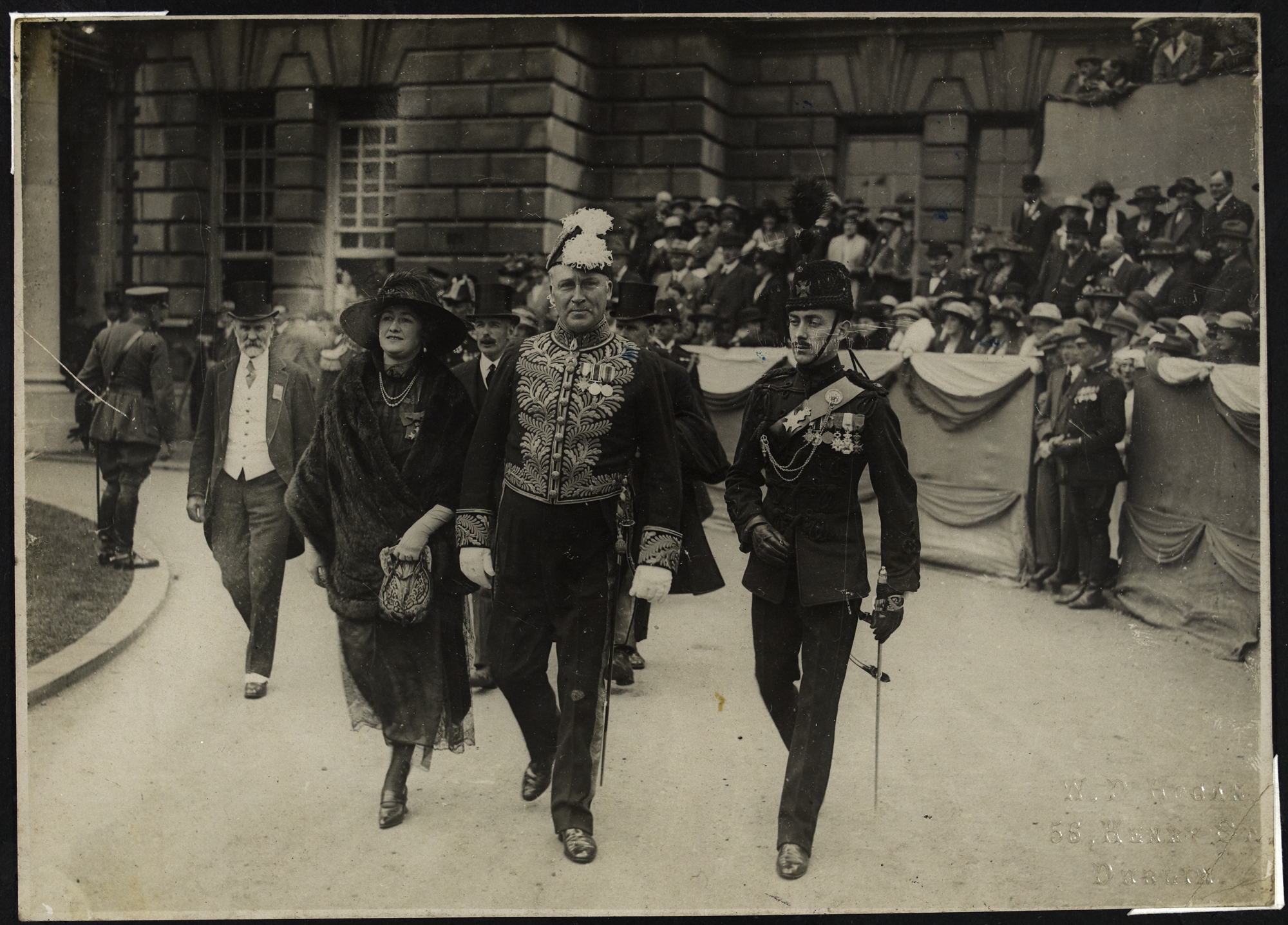
Lady Greenwood and her husband arriving for the opening of the Ulster Parliament in 1921.

Her affair with Lloyd George probably contributed to her husband's baronetcy of 1915, after which she was styled "Lady Greenwood". Her husband was elevated to the peerage in 1929 as Baron Greenwood (he became Viscount Greenwood in 1937). She was known by family and friends as "Margo". In 1922, Lady Greenwood was appointed a Dame Commander of the Order of the British Empire. She was also appointed an officer of the Most Venerable Order of the Hospital of St. John of Jerusalem.

When her father died in 1922, she was the only one of her siblings to attend the funeral.

In 1948, she attended a dinner and reception alongside Princess Elizabeth for Eleanor Roosevelt, hosted by Pilgrims Society, at the Savoy Hotel.

She died on 24 April 1968 in London.
