= Viscount Greenwood =

Title in the Peerage of the United Kingdom

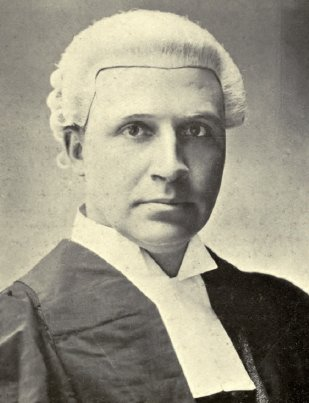
Hamar Greenwood, 1st Viscount Greenwood

Viscount Greenwood, of Holborn in the County of London, was a title in the Peerage of the United Kingdom. It was created in 1937 for the politician Thomas Hamar Greenwood, 1st Baron Greenwood. He served as the last Chief Secretary for Ireland from 1920 to 1922. Greenwood had already been created a Baronet, of Onslow Gardens in the Royal Borough of Kensington, in the Baronetage of the United Kingdom on 8 February 1915, and Baron Greenwood, of Llanbister in the County of Radnor, in the Peerage of the United Kingdom, in 1929. His younger son, the 3rd Viscount, who succeeded his elder brother in 1998, was an actor. The titles became extinct on his death in 2003.

== Viscounts Greenwood (1937) ==
- Thomas Hamar Greenwood, 1st Viscount Greenwood (1870–1948)
- David Henry Hamar Greenwood, 2nd Viscount Greenwood (1914–1998)
- Michael George Hamar Greenwood, 3rd Viscount Greenwood (1923–2003)
