= Doris Castlerosse =

English courtesan (1900–1942)

Doris Castlerosse (née Delevingne)
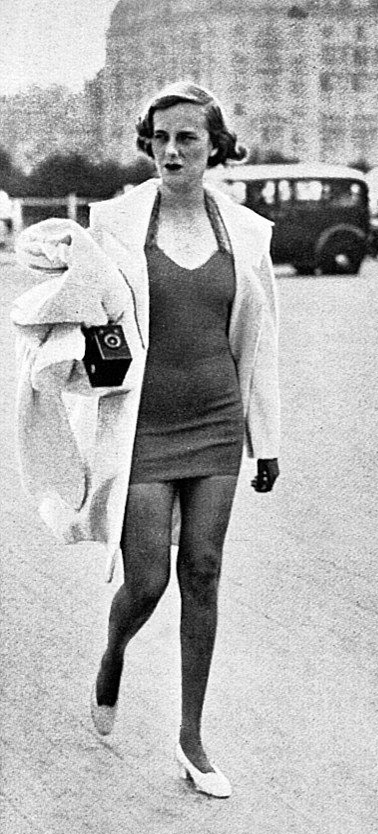
- Castlerosse in 1921
- Born: Jessie Doris Delevingne; 25 September 1900; London, England
- Died: 12 December 1942 (aged 42); London, England
- Occupation: Courtesan
- Spouse: Valentine Browne, 6th Earl of Kenmare (m. 1928; div. 1938)
- Relatives: The Hon. Angela Delevingne (sister-in-law)
- Family: Delevingne

Doris Browne, Viscountess Castlerosse (née Delevingne; 25 September 1900 – 12 December 1942) was an English courtesan and the first wife of Valentine Browne, 6th Earl of Kenmare.

== Family ==
She was born Jessie Doris Delevingne in Beckenham. She was eldest child and only daughter of Edward Charles Delevingne and Jessie Marian (née Homan). She had ‘lowly origins and place’: her father owned a haberdashery shop which also sold French goods such as silk and lace, and her mother was a housewife. She lied that she was descended from a noble Flemish family.

Through her brother Edward Dudley Delevingne, Doris was the grandaunt of models Poppy Delevingne and Cara Delevingne.

== Life before marriage ==
Doris sold second-hand gowns to actresses. Her friend Gertrude Lawrence invited Doris to live at her flat on Park Lane, Mayfair, and she became a courtesan. The writer Edith Oliver described her as 'a common little demi mondaine'. Rosa Lewis of The Cavendish Hotel advised Doris to write a book and call it ‘round the world in eighty beds’. ‘You may think it fun to make love. But if you had to make love to dirty old men as I do, you would think again’, Doris said.

Her American boyfriend Stephen "Laddie" Sanford showered her with luxuries until his attentions moved to Edwina Mountbatten. She also had a relationship with Tom Mitford.

== Marriage ==
She met Valentine Browne, Viscount Castlerosse, when she was aged 28 years. He showered her with luxuries, and, against the wishes of his parents, secretly married her at Hammersmith Register Office on 16 May 1928.

She subsequently worked as a ‘society spy’ who informed on her friends in exchange for money.

In 1932, she had an affair with Randolph Churchill, who was then aged 21, the son of the future prime minister. Her other lovers included society photographer Cecil Beaton, and possibly Winston Churchill according to a British Channel 4 programme. Churchill had met Doris on holidays in the South of France at the Château de l'Horizon, a villa owned by actress Maxine Elliott. Doris was one of many women whose portraits were painted by Churchill. Churchill's former private secretary, Jock Colville, claimed in a 1985 interview with Correlli Barnett that Doris and the future Prime Minister had a four year affair from 1933: but the Churchill scholar Andrew Roberts noted Colville did not become Churchill's private secretary until 1940 and that the allegations were "at best second-hand information". Roberts stated that "Lady Castlerosse was still legally married to Valentine Castlerosse at the time, the most waspish gossip columnist of the 1930s and the very last person an adulterer would have chosen to cuckold".

The viscount and viscountess were childless and divorced in 1938.

== After marriage ==
She had an affair with the homosexual Robert Heber-Percy, whom she claimed that she was able to "cure". For his twenty-fifth birthday, she booked a room at The Ritz and presented him with a prostitute and a whip, and ordered him to beat the woman to death, after which she beat the woman herself.

During the mid-1930s, she befriended the American Margot Hoffman, who funded her and bought her the Palazzo Venier dei Leoni in Venice, and with whom she fled to New York when the Second World War was declared. After Hoffman bored of her, Doris was forced to pawn her diamonds and return to England, where, after a failed reconciliation with her ex-husband, a police investigation into her sales of diamonds, and criticism from John Spencer-Churchill, 10th Duke of Marlborough that she had deserted her country during wartime, she committed suicide by taking a fatal dose of sleeping pills, on 12 December 1942, at the age of 42 years, at the Dorchester Hotel.
