= Baron Mount Temple =

Extinct barony in the Peerage of the United Kingdom

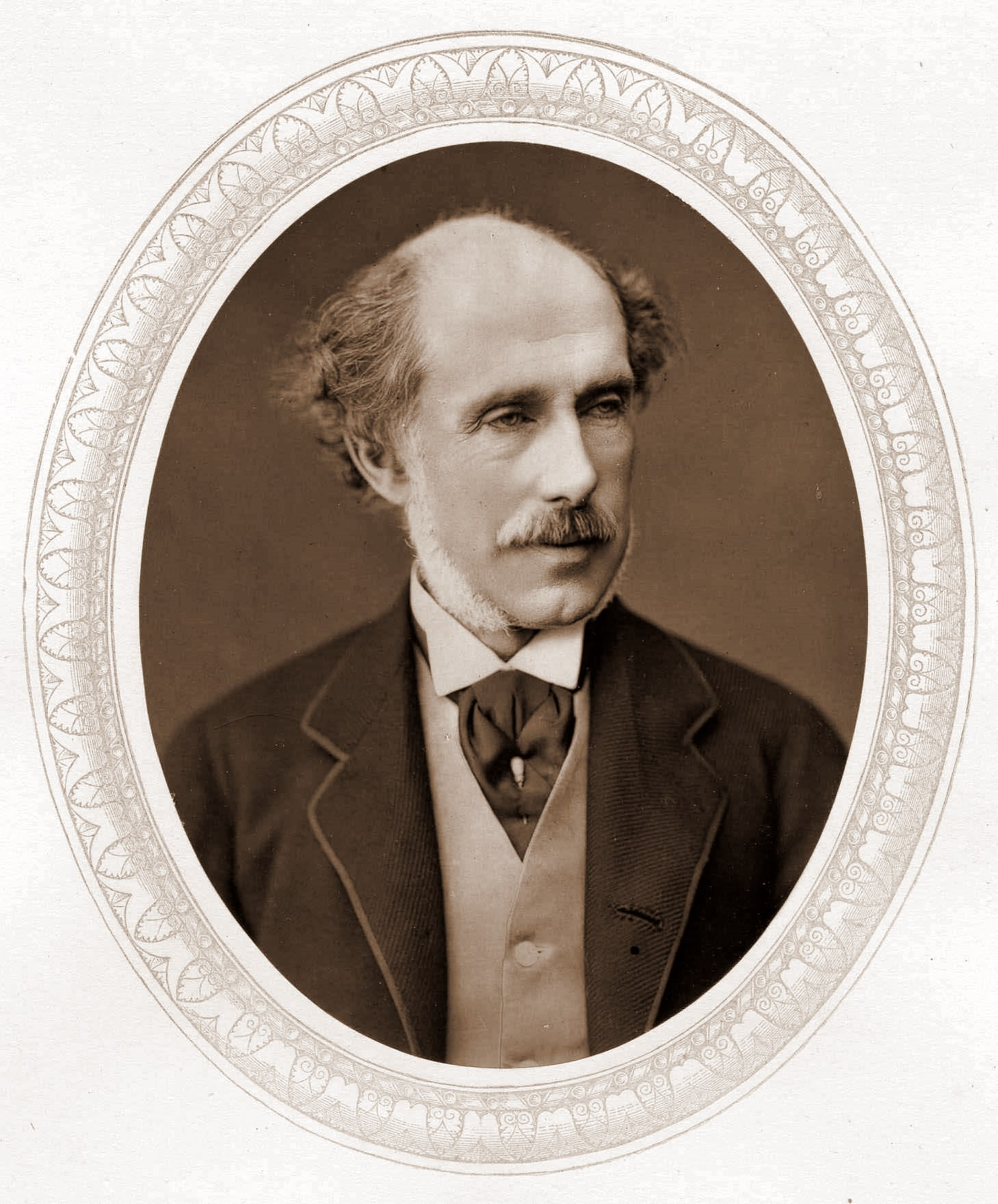
William Cowper-Temple, 1st Baron Mount Temple.

Baron Mount Temple was a title that was created twice in British history, both times in the Peerage of the United Kingdom. The first creation came on 25 May 1880 when the Liberal politician the Honourable William Cowper-Temple was made Baron Mount Temple, of Mount Temple in the County of Sligo. He was born William Cowper, the second son of Peter Clavering-Cowper, 5th Earl Cowper (see Earl Cowper for earlier history of the family) by his wife the Honourable Emily, sister of the 2nd Viscount Melbourne. Emily married as her second husband the 3rd Viscount Palmerston, a man who would serve as British prime minister. Lord Palmerston, an Anglo-Irish peer, died in 1865 when the viscountcy and his junior title of Baron Temple, of Mount Temple, became extinct. Emily died 11 September 1869, leaving her second husband's estates, including Broadlands in Hampshire, to her second son, William, who thereupon adopted by royal licence the surname Cowper-Temple, in whose favour the Mount Temple title was revived in 1880. William was married to Georgina Tollemache.

Lord Mount Temple died without issue on 16 October 1888 when the peerage became extinct. However, it was revived on 13 January 1932 when his great-nephew, the Conservative politician, Wilfrid Ashley, was made Baron Mount Temple, of Lee in the County of Southampton. He was the son of the Honourable Evelyn Ashley, private secretary to and biographer of third Viscount Palmerston and the second son of Anthony Ashley Cooper, 7th Earl of Shaftesbury (see Earl of Shaftesbury for earlier history of the family), husband of Lady Emily Cowper, sister of the first Baron of the first creation. He had already inherited Broadlands. Ashley had been married in 1901 to "Maudie" Cassel, only daughter of the Edwardian financier Sir Ernest Cassel, and their elder daughter the Honourable Edwina Ashley, a considerable heiress, was married in 1922 to Lord Louis Mountbatten, later the last Viceroy of India. After his wife's death, he married Muriel Forbes-Sempill. However, Lord Mount Temple had no sons and the title became extinct on his death on 3 July 1939. Broadlands passed through Edwina Ashley into the Mountbatten, now Knatchbull family (see Earl Mountbatten of Burma).

== Barons Mount Temple; First creation (1880) ==
- William Francis Cowper-Temple, 1st Baron Mount Temple (1811–1888)

== Barons Mount Temple; Second creation (1932) ==
- Wilfrid William Ashley, 1st Baron Mount Temple (1867–1939)

== See also ==
- Viscount Palmerston
- Earl Cowper
- Earl of Shaftesbury
- Broadlands
