= Lady Mountbatten =

British aristocrat (1901–1960)

The Right Honourable Dame The Countess Mountbatten of Burma CI GBE DCVO
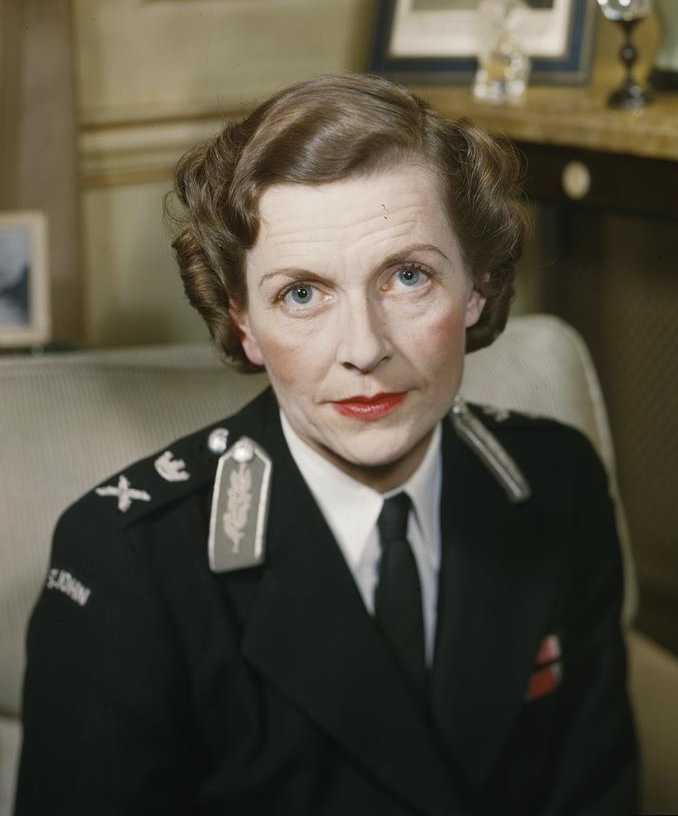
- Mountbatten in the uniform of the St John Ambulance Brigade

Viceregal consort of India
- In office 21 February 1947 – 21 June 1948
- Monarch: George VI
- Governor- General: The Viscount Mountbatten of Burma

Personal details
- Born: Edwina Cynthia Annette Ashley; 28 November 1901 London, England
- Died: 21 February 1960 (aged 58) Jesselton, Crown Colony of North Borneo
- Resting place: Off the coast of Portsmouth
- Spouse: Louis Mountbatten, 1st Earl Mountbatten of Burma (m. 1922)
- Children: Patricia Knatchbull, 2nd Countess Mountbatten of Burma; Lady Pamela Hicks
- Parents: Wilfrid Ashley, 1st Baron Mount Temple; Maud Cassel

Edwina Cynthia Annette Mountbatten, Countess Mountbatten of Burma (née Ashley; 28 November 1901 – 21 February 1960), commonly known as Lady Mountbatten, was an English heiress, socialite, and relief worker. As the wife of Rear Admiral Louis Mountbatten, 1st Earl Mountbatten of Burma, she served as the last vicereine of India during the reign of George VI and became a close relative by marriage of the British royal family. She was appointed a Commander of the Order of the British Empire in 1943 and a Dame Commander of the Royal Victorian Order in 1946 for her work with the St John Ambulance Brigade and the British Red Cross during World War II.

== Early life ==
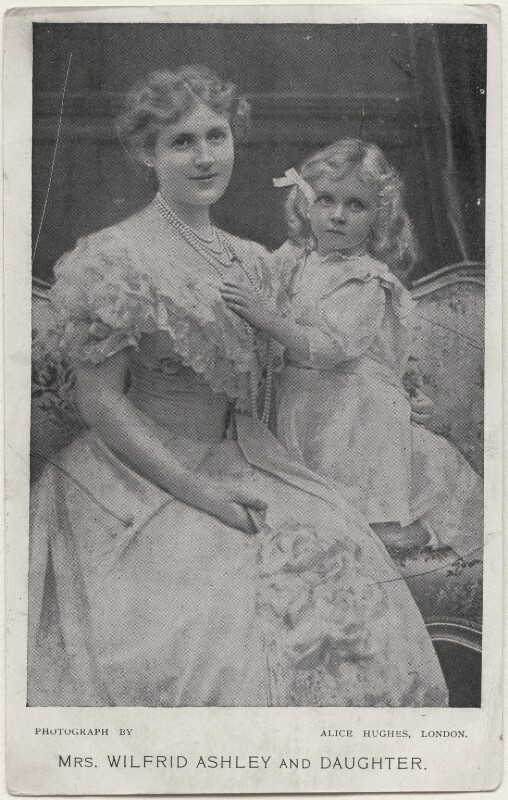
Edwina with her mother circa 1907

Edwina Cynthia Annette Ashley was born on 28 November 1901, the elder daughter of Wilfrid Ashley, later 1st Baron Mount Temple, and Amalia Mary Maud Cassel (1880–1911). Her younger sister was Mary Ashley (Lady Delamere). Through her father she was a great‑granddaughter of the reforming 7th Earl of Shaftesbury. Her mother was the only child of the international financier Sir Ernest Cassel (1852–1921), a close friend and private adviser to the future King Edward VII. Cassel, born in Cologne, Prussia, to a Jewish family, became one of the wealthiest and most influential men in Europe.

Following her mother's death and her father's remarriage to Molly Forbes-Sempill (formerly the wife of Rear-Admiral Arthur Forbes-Sempill), Edwina was sent to boarding schools, first the Links in Eastbourne and later Alde House in Suffolk. She disliked both establishments. Alongside a strained relationship with her stepmother, she was bullied because her grandfather was new rich, German, and Jewish. She later described her experience at school as "sheer hell". Her grandfather eventually intervened, inviting her to live with him and to act as hostess at his London residence, Brook House. His other properties, including Moulton Paddocks and Branksome Dene, later formed part of her inheritance.

=== Louis Mountbatten ===
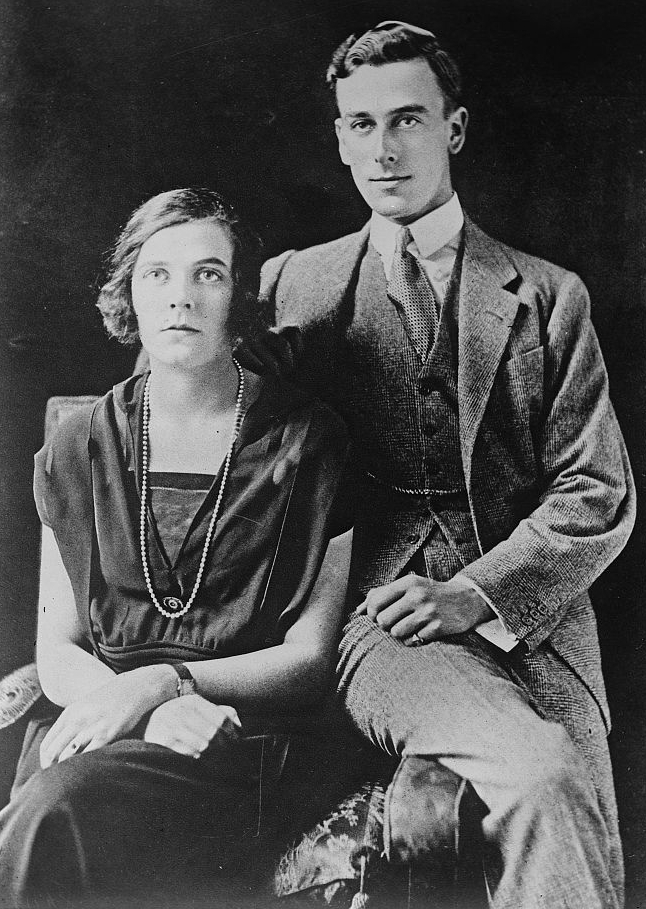
Edwina and Louis Mountbatten early in marriage

Edwina first met Louis Mountbatten, a relation of the British royal family and nephew of Empress Alexandra of Russia, at a ball at Claridge's in October 1920. By then she was already a prominent figure in London society.

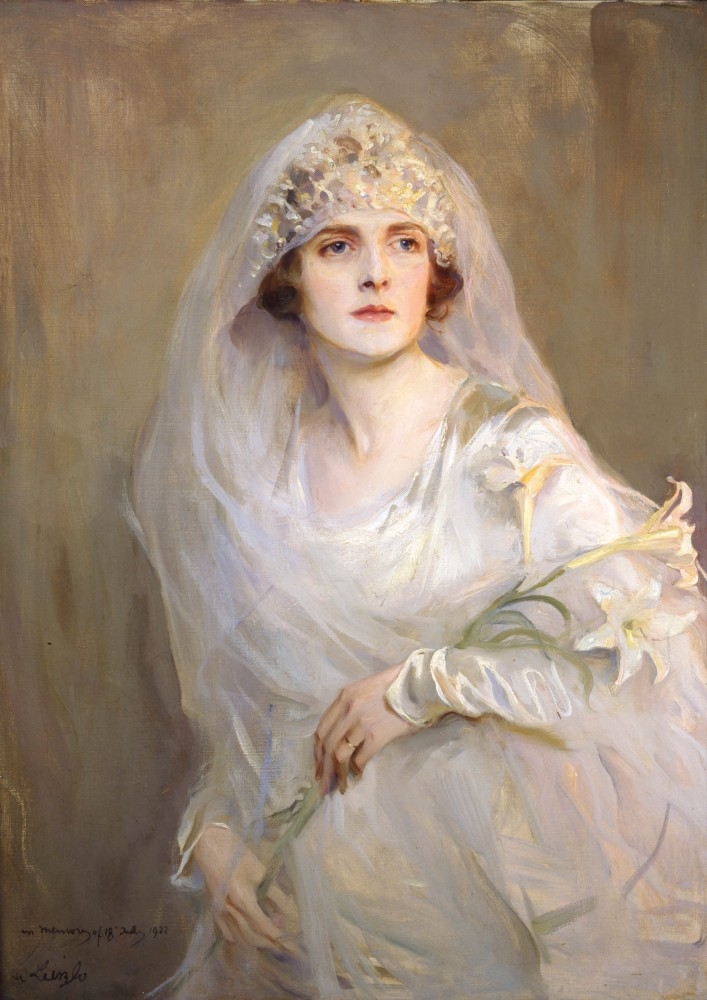
Edwina in her wedding dress, 1923, by Philip de László

The couple married on 18 July 1922 at St Margaret's, Westminster. More than 8,000 people gathered to witness the event, which was attended by Queen Mary, Queen Alexandra, and the Prince of Wales (the future King Edward VIII), who served as Mountbatten's best man. Contemporary newspapers dubbed it the "wedding of the year". Their honeymoon included visits to several European royal courts and a tour of the United States, during which they visited Niagara Falls because, as Edwina remarked, "all honeymooners went there". While in California they appeared in a private silent film made by Charlie Chaplin, Nice And Friendly, which was never commercially released.

=== Wealth and inheritance ===
On the death of her maternal grandfather in 1921, Edwina inherited a life interest in a trust fund derived from a 25/64 share of his residuary estate, valued at approximately £7,330,000 (about £390 million in 2023). After specific bequests, administrative costs, and death duties, the amount placed in trust for her benefit was about £1,600,000. Edwina also inherited a reversionary interest in her grandfather's London mansion Brook House, located on the corner of Park Lane and Upper Brook Street in Mayfair; this was subject to the life interest in the property of Edwina's great-aunt Wilhelmina Cassel. Edwina occupied an apartment on the house's third floor from 1922, and following her aunt's death in 1925 she inherited the mansion.

At the time, her future husband's salary as a Royal Navy lieutenant was £310 a year (about £16,400 in 2023), supplemented by his private income. She later inherited Broadlands, the family seat in Hampshire, from her father.

Edwina's obituary in the Daily Telegraph asserts that during the 1930s Edwina and Mountbatten enjoyed a combined pre‑tax income of £113,000. Mountbatten later told their elder daughter that, before the Second World War, the couple sometimes struggled to spend their post‑tax income of £60,000 a year.

During early 1938 newspaper reports of courtroom discussions regarding income of Edwina's sister The Hon. Mary Cunningham-Reid during the latter's divorce from Alec Cunningham-Reid noted that under the terms of Sir Ernest Cassel's will, following Mary's first marriage in 1927 she became entitled to a large annual income from the trust in which her grandfather's residuary estate was held; during the period between 1927 to 1938 this amount ranged from £70,000 to £90,000 per year. Cassell's will had provided that Ruth would be entitled to a 15/64 share of the trust income, whilst Edwina's entitlement was 25/64 shares; consequently Edwina's trust income during this period ranged from £116,000 to £150,000 annually.

By the end of the war the highest rate of income tax in Britain had risen to 19s 6d in the pound (97.5 per cent), reducing the Mountbattens' post‑tax income from Edwina’s trust to £4,500. They sought parliamentary approval to amend the trust's restrictive terms, arguing that their extensive programme of public duties placed an exceptional burden on their private resources. The resulting "Mountbatten Estate Bill" was introduced in 1949. During committee hearings, Edwina's representative, Sir Walter Monckton KC, noted that she had enjoyed a post‑tax income of about £40,000 before the war.

== Second World War ==
After the outbreak of the Second World War, Edwina travelled to the United States, where she expressed gratitude for the fundraising efforts undertaken on behalf of the British Red Cross and St John Ambulance Brigade. In 1942, she was appointed Superintendent‑in‑Chief of the St John Ambulance Brigade, a role in which she served extensively. In 1945, she assisted in the repatriation of prisoners of war in Southeast Asia. She was appointed CBE in 1943 and advanced to Dame Commander of the Royal Victorian Order (DCVO) in 1946. She also received the American Red Cross Medal.

In 1943, Edwina became president of the animal‑welfare organisation Our Dumb Friends' League. In 1946 she became Vice President of the British Commonwealth and Empire Nurses’ War Memorial Fund which later merged into the Commonwealth Nurses and Midwives Federation.

== Vicereine of India ==
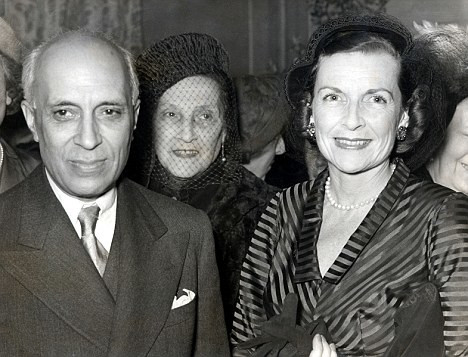
Prime Minister Nehru with Edwina in 1951

At a rally in Singapore, Edwina was knocked over in a surge of people. Jawaharlal Nehru and Lord Mountbatten linked arms and pushed through the crowd to help her. The incident led to the three dining together, and, as Mountbatten later recalled, they "talked about everything under the sun", marking the beginning of their friendship. Edwina's younger daughter, Pamela, denied the rumours that her mother was engaged in an affair with Nehru.

Shortly afterwards, Mountbatten was appointed the last Viceroy of India. Edwina served as the final vicereine during the closing months of the British Raj and the first months of the post‑Partition period (February 1947 to June 1948), when Mountbatten became Governor-General of India, though not of the Dominion of Pakistan.

From 28 October 1947 she was styled Countess Mountbatten of Burma, following her husband's elevation to an earldom. In the aftermath of the violence that accompanied Partition, Edwina's priority was to mobilise the large‑scale relief efforts required, work for which she was widely praised. She also organised cholera vaccinations and sanitation facilities for displaced people.

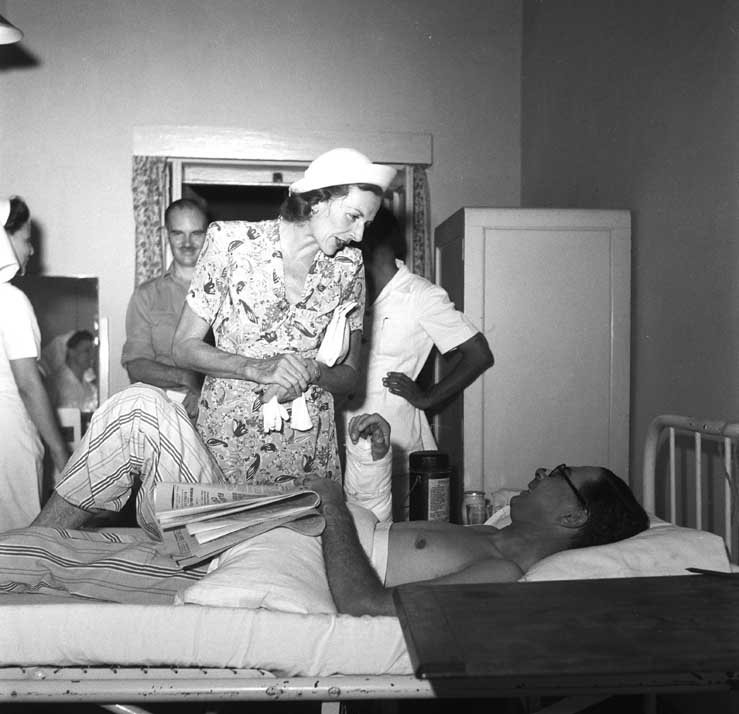
Edwina at Police Hospital, Delhi, 1947

After her viceroyalty she continued her public service, including further work for the St John Ambulance Brigade. She became a governor of the Peckham Experiment in 1949. She was President of the Royal College of Nursing Education Fund Appeal from 1950-1954, often collaborating with Princess Margaret, Countess of Snowdon who was the President of the Student Nurses Association. The Appeal raised £273, 812. In recognition of her support Mountbatten was made Vice-President of the Royal College of Nursing 1950 until her death in 1960. Upon her death the RCN created the 'Countess Mountbatten Memorial Council for Nursing Research' to advise on nursing research.

== Personal life ==
Edwina and Mountbatten had two daughters: Patricia (14 February 1924 – 13 June 2017) and Pamela (19 April 1929 – 5 June 2026). In 1944, the journalist Drew Pearson described Edwina as "one of the most beautiful women in England".

Edwina and her husband Louis Mountbatten were romantically estranged for most of their marriage while maintaining a strong socio-political partnership. Their daughter Pamela Hicks noted that while her parents had a 'tremendous partnership', it was not 'a domestic, lovey-dovey, clinging-together relationship'. Both partners pursued independent personal lives. While intense media speculation followed her relationship with India's first Prime Minister and Mountbatten family friend, Jawaharlal Nehru, her daughter Pamela and other contemporary observers note that it was intensely intellectual and spiritual bond, not a physical one.

She was extremely close to her sister‑in‑law, the Marchioness of Milford Haven, the wife of Lord Milford Haven. The two frequently travelled together on adventurous journeys, often in difficult or dangerous parts of the world.

== Death ==
Edwina had been in poor health for several years with recurring headaches, flu and suffering from fatigue. A doctor had diagnosed her with angina and warned her not to overexert herself. Ignoring the medical advice her angina continued to worsen and in 1960, Edwina was told if she continued living a stressful life she would only have months left to live.

Edwina died in her sleep on 21 February 1960, aged 58, in Jesselton (now Kota Kinabalu), North Borneo (now Sabah), while on an inspection tour for the St John Ambulance Brigade.

In accordance with her wishes, she was buried at sea off the coast of Portsmouth from HMS Wakeful on 25 February; Geoffrey Fisher, Archbishop of Canterbury, officiated.

Nehru ordered the Indian Navy frigate INS Trishul, then in port for repairs, to escort Wakeful and cast a wreath.

=== Estate ===
Following Edwina's death, her gross personal estate was valued at £589,655, with a net value of £478,618. Death duties of £333,153 were levied on the estate; Mountbatten reportedly complained to friends that his net inheritance from his wife's estate would equate to about one shilling in the pound (5 per cent). Each of her daughters received 7.5 per cent of the personal estate after the payment of duties.

The valuation and taxation of the trust fund Edwina had inherited from her grandfather Ernest Cassel was handled separately from her personal estate, with the trustees responsible for paying tax from the trust's assets; unlike her personal fortune, probate of the trust was not required to be published.

== Honours ==
- Dame Commander of the Royal Victorian Order (DCVO) – 1 January 1946
- Venerable Order of the Hospital of St. John of Jerusalem (Dame Grand Cross: 1 January 1946; Commander: 19 December 1928)
- Lady of the Imperial Order of the Crown of India (CI) -21 February 1947
- Dame Grand Cross of the Order of the British Empire (GBE: 1 January 1948; CBE: 1 January 1943)
- Service Medal of the Order of St John
- King George V Silver Jubilee Medal
- King George VI Coronation Medal
- Queen Elizabeth II Coronation Medal

== In popular culture ==
Lady Mountbatten of Burma has been portrayed by:

- Jane Myerson in the 1982 epic biographical film Gandhi
- Janet Suzman in the 1986 television drama Lord Mountbatten: The Last Viceroy
- Maria Aitken in the 1998 biographical film Jinnah
- Gillian Anderson in Gurinder Chadha's drama film Viceroy's House (2017)
- Lucy Russell in series 2 of The Crown (2017)
