= Moore Disney =

British army officer (1765-1846)

General Sir Moore Disney KCB
- Born: 16 June 1765; Ireland
- Died: 19 April 1846; London, England
- Military career
- Allegiance: United Kingdom
- Branch: British Army
- Rank: General
- Unit: 1st Regiment of Foot Guards
- Conflicts: Corunna; Flanders Campaign; Walcheren Expedition
- Awards: KCB

General Sir Moore Disney, KCB (16 June 1765 – 19 April 1846) was a senior officer in the British Army.

== Early life and education ==
Disney was the eldest son of Moore Disney, of Churchtown, County Waterford, who was descended from the Disneys of Norton Disney in Northamptonshire. He was educated at Charterhouse School and Harrow School.

== Career ==
He entered the army as an ensign in the 1st Regiment of Foot Guards (later the Grenadier Guards) on 17 April 1783, and after serving in America for a few months towards the end of the American War of Independence was promoted lieutenant and captain in 1791. He then served between 1793 and 1795 with the Guards throughout the Flanders campaign under the Duke of York and was promoted to captain and lieutenant-colonel on 12 June 1795. He was promoted to colonel on 29 April 1802 and left for Sicily in command of the 3rd Battalion of the Guards. He was made a brigadier-general in Sicily in August 1807 and was commandant of Messina from January to July 1808, prior to making his way home to take command of a brigade in England.

Calling at Lisbon en route he was asked by General Cradock to take command of a brigade consisting of the 2nd, 3rd, 6th and 50th regiments which Cradock wanted to send to join the army of Sir John Moore in Spain. He led the brigade safely to Castello Branco by way of Abrantes, handed over to Major-General Alan Cameron, and joined the main army under Sir John Moore. He reached Toro in safety, was put in command of a brigade of General Sir Edward Paget's reserve consisting of the 28th and 91st regiments, and was detailed to cover the retreat of Sir John Moore to Corunna. For his services at the Battle of Corunna he received a gold medal and was promoted to major-general on 25 April 1809.

Later that year he commanded the first Brigade of Guards, attached to Hope's reserve division, as part of the ill-fated Walcheren expedition, and on his return to England was given the command of the Home District. In 1810 he went out to Cádiz to act as second-in-command to General Graham, afterwards Lord Lynedoch, and the following year succeeded him as commandant there. In 1811 he handed over the command to Major-General George Cooke and returned to England, never again to go on active service. He was promoted to lieutenant-general on 4 June 1814.

On 23 July 1814 he was given the colonelcy of the 15th (Yorkshire East Riding) Regiment of Foot, a position he held until his death. He was made a KCB in 1815 and promoted to full General on 10 January 1837.

He died in 1846 at his house in Upper Brook Street, London.

== Family ==
Disney married Mary, one of the daughters of George Cooke Yarborough of Streethope, Yorkshire, who was the widow of Ralph Sneyd. Mary died on 26 January 1831.

Military offices
Preceded by Henry Watson Powell	Colonel of the 15th (the Yorkshire East Riding) Regiment of Foot; 1814–1846	Succeeded by Sir Phineas Riall
