= Wilfrid Ashley, 1st Baron Mount Temple =

British politician (1867–1939)

Colonel The Right Honourable The Lord Mount Temple PC DL
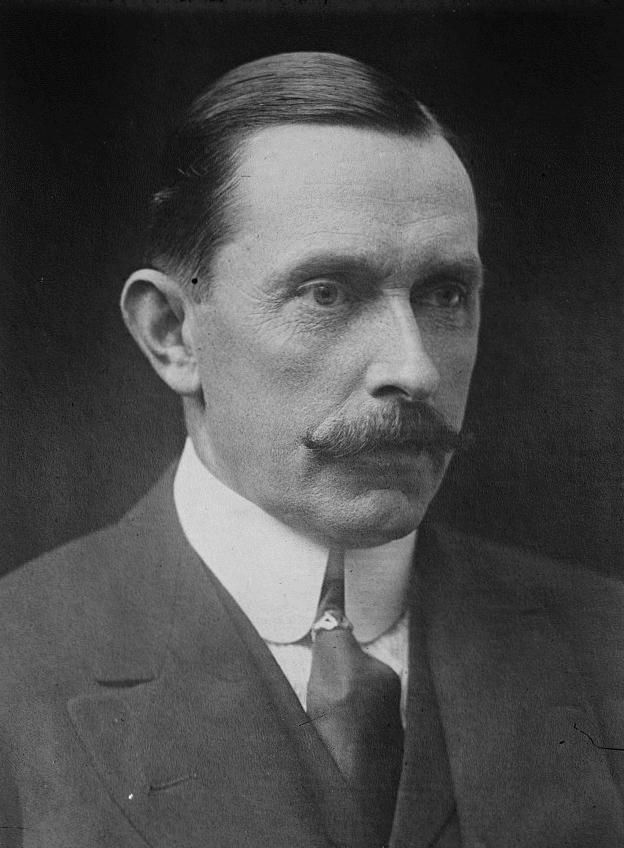

Minister for Transport
- In office 11 November 1924 – 4 June 1929
- Monarch: George V
- Prime Minister: Stanley Baldwin
- Preceded by: Harry Gosling
- Succeeded by: Herbert Morrison

Personal details
- Born: Wilfrid William Ashley; 13 September 1867
- Died: 3 July 1939 (aged 71) Romsey, Hampshire
- Party: Conservative
- Spouses: Amalia Mary Maud Cassel (m. 1901; died 1911) Muriel Emily Spencer (m. 1914)
- Children: Edwina Mountbatten, Countess Mountbatten of Burma; Mary Cholmondeley, Lady Delamere
- Parent(s): Evelyn Ashley; Sybella Charlotte Farquhar
- Education: Magdalen College, Oxford

Colonel Wilfrid William Ashley, 1st Baron Mount Temple, PC DL (13 September 1867 – 3 July 1939) was a British soldier and Conservative politician. He was Minister of Transport between 1924 and 1929 under Stanley Baldwin.

== Background and education ==
Ashley was the son of Hon. Evelyn Ashley, second surviving son of the social reformer Anthony Ashley-Cooper, 7th Earl of Shaftesbury. His mother was Sybella Charlotte Farquhar, daughter of Sir Walter Farquhar, 3rd Baronet. William Cowper-Temple, 1st Baron Mount Temple, was his great-uncle. He was educated at Harrow and Magdalen College, Oxford. He left Oxford without taking a degree, and then travelled widely, including in Africa and the Americas.

== Military career ==
Ashley served in the Ayrshire militia (1886–9), then held an active commission in the regular army with the Grenadier Guards (1889–98), before returning to the militia when he was commissioned in the 3rd (Hampshire Militia) Battalion, Hampshire Regiment (1899–1902). Though in the militia, he volunteered for active service in South Africa during the Second Boer War (1899–1902), but was invalided home. He resigned from the militia with the honorary rank of major in December 1902.

== Political career ==
Ashley's father was a Liberal Unionist and Ashley initially acted as private secretary to Sir Henry Campbell-Bannermann, beginning in 1899, when he was the leader of the opposition. After being invalided home from the South Africa in 1901, he congratulated Campbell-Bannermann on his "methods of barbarism" speech in June 1901.

Ashley, who held the rank of colonel in the British Army, was well known as an activist in various pressure groups before commencing his party political career. He was a leading figure in the Navy League and also set up the anti-state intervention No More Waste Committee during the First World War. He was subsequently involved in the foundation of the Comrades of the Great War in 1917 and as President of the group helped to ensure that the ex-serviceman's movement was closely linked to the Conservative Party at its foundation.

Ashley was elected to Parliament in 1906 to represent Blackpool, holding the seat until 1918 before subsequently sitting as a member for Fylde until 1922 and New Forest from 1922 to 1932. Ashley commanded the 20th battalion of the King's Regiment (Liverpool) in 1914 in the rank of lieutenant-colonel before returning to England in 1915 to become parliamentary private secretary to the financial secretary to the War Office. Ashley, who owned Classiebawn Castle in southern Ireland, was a fierce opponent of Irish republicanism and wrote to David Lloyd George, then Prime Minister, in 1921 to ask for the protection of his Irish estates.

He served under Bonar Law and Stanley Baldwin as Parliamentary Secretary to the Ministry of Transport and Parliamentary Secretary to the Office of Works from October 1922 until October 1923, when he was appointed Under-Secretary of State for War, which he remained until January 1924. Ashley was sworn of the Privy Council in February 1924 and when the Conservatives returned to power under Baldwin in November of that year he was made Minister for Transport, an office he retained until the fall of the Baldwin administration in 1929. He left the House of Commons in 1932 and was raised to the peerage as Baron Mount Temple, of Lee in the County of Southampton, a revival of the title held by his great-uncle.

== The Anglo-German Fellowship ==
Lord Mount Temple remained active within the House of Lords and was a vocal supporter of the policy of appeasement towards Nazi Germany. He admired Adolf Hitler for his anti-communism, although much of his conviction rested on the belief that the Treaty of Versailles had been unjust to begin with and that it should be revised regardless of who was in government in Germany. In 1935, in order to underline his support for the Germans, Lord Mount Temple was instrumental in establishing the Anglo-German Fellowship. He served as chairman of both this group and Anti-Socialist Union simultaneously in the later 1930s. The British historian Brian Connell wrote that Mount Temple was "an officer and a gentleman of the old school who regarded socialism as a subversion".

The Anglo-German Fellowship was an elitist group intended to bring together the elites of Germany and Britain by promoting cultural exchanges and economic agreements. The Fellowship had about 250 members at the beginning of 1936, and besides for Mount Temple other aristocrats sitting on the executive board included Lord Londonderry; Lord Lothian, the Earl of Glasgow; the Duke of Wellington; Lord McGowan, Lord Mottistone; Lord Redesdale, and Lord Brocket. Mount Temple argued that his group was eminently respectable with some of the illustrious and richest British aristocrats serving in its ranks. Mount Temple was the chairman of the Fellowship, but the group's two most important members were the merchant banker Sir Ernest Tennant and the historian Philip Conwell-Evans with the latter serving as the British agent for Joachim von Ribbentrop. On 5 December 1935, Mount Temple made a speech at a Fellowship meeting in London saying he hoped if another world war came that "the sides will be different" with the implication that Britain and Germany should be allies against France. In the same speech, he praised the "traditional friendship between England and Germany" and added: "we know Germany fought fair and I hope that in the next war – well I mustn't say what I was going to say!" Mount Temple's speech caused much discussion at the time with its implicit call for an Anglo-German alliance. In a speech given in Berlin on 11 January 1936 at an Anglo-German Fellowship meeting, Mount Temple stated: "our public opinion is convinced that a final and clear understanding between our two peoples must be attained so that peace and stability in the world can be established". In the same speech, he praised the Nazi regime for banning the German Communist Party as he stated: "Your strength and determination have liberated Europe from a real danger – a danger which seems at a moment to have vanished, but which can at any moment reappear".

Mount Temple's speech in Berlin was very typical of his viewpoint which held that another war with Germany would be so catastrophic to the world that it must be avoided at almost any cost. Alongside this belief about the frightful possibility of another world war was the belief that the Treaty of Versailles was deeply unjust to Germany and so the Reich was morally justified in challenging the Treaty of Versailles. As such, Mount Temple and the other members of the Anglo-German Fellowship saw France – the power most committed to upholding the Treaty of Versailles – as the main danger to world peace rather than Germany. Mount Temple often stated that he hoped "in the next war" that Germany and Britain would be fighting on the same side as he argued that Nazi Germany was the most logical ally for Britain to choose. In a letter to The Times on 4 April 1936, he wrote that the most dangerous nation in western Europe was France, which signed a treaty of alliance with the Soviet Union the previous year, and he expressed concern that the recent Anglo-French staff talks began in the aftermath of the Remilitarisation of the Rhineland might lead to Britain fighting on the same side as France and the Soviet Union against Germany. In what sounded like a threat to the government, Mount Temple wrote: "To find themselves drawn into a war in defense of Bolshevism would be deeply repugnant to the mass of British people. They would resent seeing the Union Jack flying beside the Red Flag and would rightly refuse to rise in honour of the Internationale". Mount Temple wrote the remilitarisaton of the Rhineland was a welcome development that improved the prospects of peace. On 14 July 1936 in an anti-French gesture intended to mark Bastille Day, Mount Temple hosted the Duke of Brunswick at a Fellowship dinner. A number of speeches at the dinner were given over to praising the German military in World War One as an honourable and noble enemy while disparaging the French military in World War One as a dishonourable and ignoble ally. In September 1936, Mount Temple attended the annual Nazi Party rally in Nuremberg. Mount Temple and the other Fellowship members who attended the rally were described as part of "Ribbentrop's kindergarten" as the Fellowship members all expressed much gratitude to Ribbentrop for letting them attend the rally. The British historian Richard Griffiths noted that in 1936 the Fellowship members who attended the rally all expressed much admiration for Nazi Germany and Hitler and after the war all claimed to have been disgusted by Nazism along with the "mad" Hitler.

On 14 May 1937, Lord Mount Temple welcomed the German War Minister, Field Marshal Werner von Blomberg to London. At the dinner of the Fellowship held in Blomberg's honor, Mount Temple praised him as "an outstanding figure of the new Germany" who had "helped to build up for Germany the means of self-defense which a vindictive treaty attempted to take away". Mount Temple called Blomberg a hero for his role in German rearmament and violating the Treaty of Versailles, saying he had "created what any impartial historian must regard as essential to a Great Nation; Self-Respect and World Equality". In July 1937, Mount Temple wrote in The Anglo-German Review (the journal of the Fellowship) that the British newspapers had made "little or no attempt to describe any of the constructive efforts of the Hitler regime in the social sphere". The elitism of the Fellowship limited its ability to influence British public opinion as the group was expressly not intended to appeal to the masses and the people who did join the Fellowship were overwhelming already convinced of the necessity of an Anglo-German alliance. The British historian Geoffrey Waddington wrote that the Fellowship was "preaching to the converted".

As AGF chairman, Lord Mount Temple (as he now was) visited Germany in mid-1937 and held a meeting with Hitler. Upon his return from Germany, Lord Mount Temple attempted to see the Prime Minister Neville Chamberlain to discuss his meeting at the Berghof. Sir Robert Vansittart, the British Foreign Office's Permanent Undersecretary wrote a memo stating that:

"The P.M. [Prime Minister] should certainly not see Lord Mount Temple – nor should the S[ecretary] of S[tate]. We really must put a stop to this eternal butting in of amateurs – and Lord Mount Temple is a particularly silly one. These activities – which are practically confined to Germany – render impossible the task of diplomacy. Lord Londonderry goes to Berlin; Lord Lothian goes to Berlin; Mr. Lansbury goes to Berlin; and now Lord Mount Temple goes. They all want interviews with the S of S, and two at least have had them. This flow is quite unfair to the service and Sir E. Phipps rightly complained of these ambulant amateurs. So did Sir N. Henderson in advance, and rightly, for Lord Lothian's last visit is being mischievously and unintelligently misused, particularly at the Imperial Conference. The proper course for any ambulant amateur is to be seen by someone less important than Ministers. If there is anything worthwhile in their remarks – there never is, for of course, we have much better information than this naïf propaganda stuff – we can report it to the S of S. But a stage has now been reached where the service is entitled to at least this amount of protection. These superficial people are always gulled into the lines of least resistance – vide Lord Lothian – and we then have the ungrateful but necessary task of pointing out the snags and appearing obstructive. It is quite unfair and should cease".

In a letter to The Times that was published on 26 February 1938, Mount Temple called the Anschluss an expression of the Nazi "dynamic of National Liberation" from the Treaty of Versailles. In the same letter, Mount Temple wrote "the integrity of the countries of Eastern Europe is in no danger from such a philosophy". In October 1938, after the Munich Agreement, he was among twenty-six signatories of a letter to The Times, calling the agreement "the rectification of one of the most flagrant injustices in the peace treaties". At a Fellowship dinner on 10 October 1938 in London, Mount Temple praised the Munich Agreement as marking the beginning of a new era of Anglo-German friendship as he declared: "Seventeen out of twenty Englishmen ardently desire an understanding with Germany".

Unlike some of his contemporaries in the Fellowship, the laissez-faire capitalist Mount Temple did not support ideological Nazism (perhaps due in part to the fact that his first wife was Jewish). In the aftermath of Kristallnacht he resigned in protest from the chairmanship although his membership of the group continued. Mount Temple in his resignation letter stated that he had resigned "as a protest against the treatment of the Jews by the German government". Of the 900 members of the Fellowship by this point, only 20 resigned in protest of the Kristallnacht. During the Danzig crisis, Mount Temple lobbied for a "peace" policy to find a way to avoid having Britain go to war against Germany in defense of Poland.

== Personal life ==
In 2008, the British historian Edward Feuchtwanger described Ashley as "a strikingly good-looking man, of military bearing, courteous and tactful, with strongly held, rather conventional views, sometimes regarded as reactionary".

Lord Mount Temple married Amalia Mary Maud Cassel, daughter and only child of financier Sir Ernest Cassel, in early January 1901. Amongst the wedding guests was The Prince Albert Edward, Prince of Wales (the wedding taking place on 4 January, only eighteen days before Albert Edward became King-Emperor), who was a friend of Cassel. The couple had two daughters:

- Edwina (1901–1960), who married The 1st Earl Mountbatten of Burma (1900–1979)
- Ruth Mary (1906–1986), who married Alec Cunningham-Reid (1895–1977) in 1927. They divorced in 1940. She then married Major Ernest Laurie Gardner. They divorced in 1943. In 1944 she married the 4th Baron Delamere (1900–1979). They divorced in 1955.

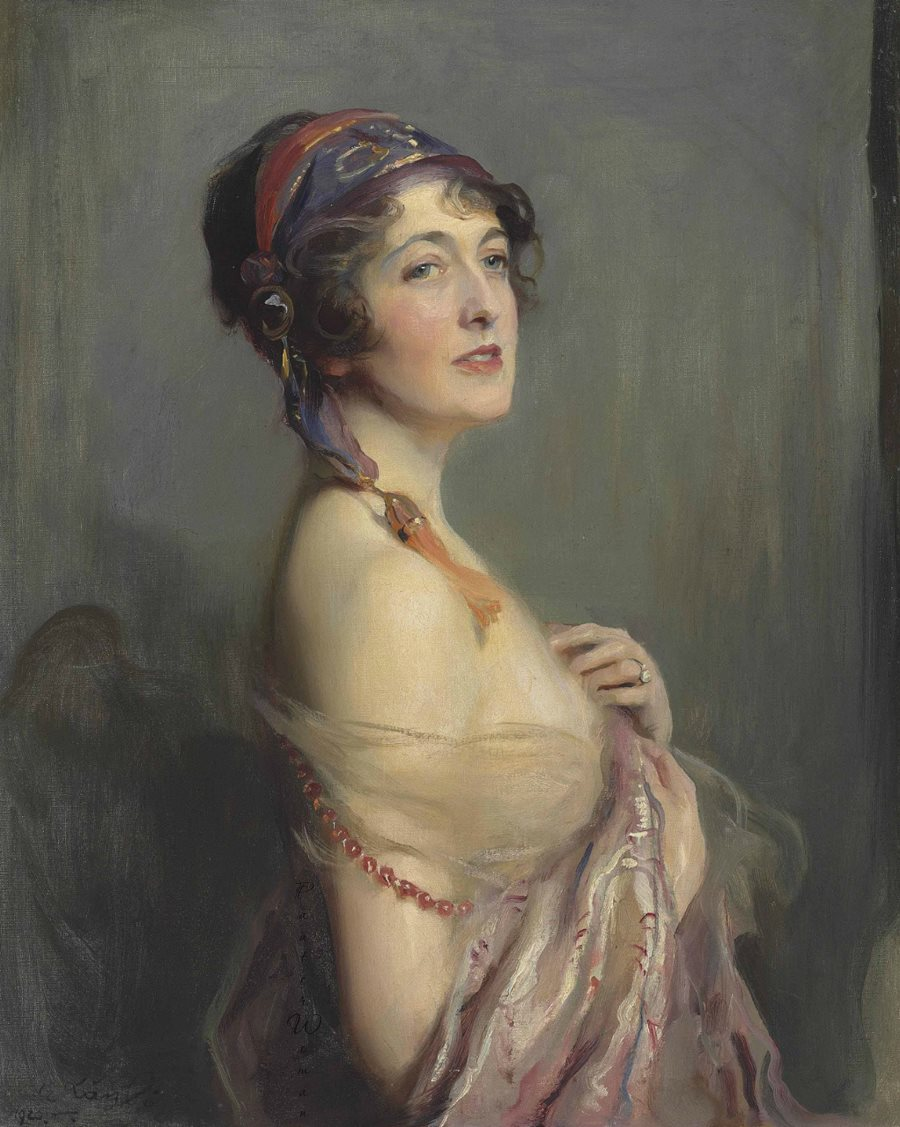
Portrait of Mrs Wilfrid Ashley (née Muriel Emily ["Molly"] Spencer) by Philip de László, 1920

Following his first wife's early death in 1911, he married in 1914 Muriel Emily ("Molly") Forbes-Sempill, the former wife of Rear-Admiral The Hon. Arthur Forbes-Sempill, daughter of The Rev. Walter Spencer of Fownhope Court, Herefordshire, and sister of Margery, Viscountess Greenwood.

The couple commissioned the architect Oliver Hill to design two Westminster town houses, naming them both Gayfere House. The first house, built at 12 Gayfere Street (1923–26), had a drawing room completely decorated with gold leaf. The second, at the corner of Gayfere Street and Great Peter Street (1929–32), was decorated in Art Deco style, making much use of mirrored walls and ceilings, most famously in a bathroom called by the Press "Lady Mount Temple's Crystal Palace". She died on 30 June 1954 at Culver House, Penshurst, Kent aged 73.

The family also owned Classiebawn Castle on the west coast of Ireland.

Lord Mount Temple collapsed and died following a recent diagnosis of Parkinson's disease at his home Broadlands in July 1939, aged 71, at which time the barony became extinct and the Broadlands estate passed to his eldest daughter Edwina Ashley, the wife of Lord Louis Mountbatten.

== Books and articles ==
- Griffiths, Richard (1980). Fellow Travellers of the Right British Enthusiasts for Nazi Germany, 1933-9. London: Constable. ISBN 0571271324.
- Kershaw, Ian (2004). Making Friends with Hitler: Lord Londonderry, the Nazis, and the Road to War. London: Penguin Books. ISBN 0143036076.
- McDonough, Frank (2011). "When Instinct Clouds Judgement: Neville Chamberlain and the Pursuit of Appeasement with Nazi Germany, 1937-1939". The Origins of the Second World War. London: Continuum. pp. 186–204.
- Waddington, Geoffrey (January 1997). "An Idyllic and Unruffled Atmosphere of Complete Anglo-German Misunderstanding: Aspects of the Operations of the Dienststelle Ribbentrop in Great Britain, 1934–1938". History. 82 (265): 44–74. doi:10.1111/1468-229X.00027.

Parliament of the United Kingdom
Preceded by Henry Wilson Worsley-Taylor	Member of Parliament for Blackpool; 1906 – 1918	Succeeded by Albert Lindsay Parkinson
New constituency	Member of Parliament for Fylde; 1918 – 1922	Succeeded by Lord Stanley
Preceded by Walter Perkins	Member of Parliament for New Forest and Christchurch; 1922 – 1932	Succeeded by John Digby Mills
Political offices
Preceded by Arthur Neal	Parliamentary Secretary to the Ministry of Transport; 1922–1923	Succeeded by John Moore-Brabazon
Preceded by Hon. Walter Guinness	Under-Secretary of State for War; 1923–1924	Succeeded by Clement Attlee
Preceded by Harry Gosling	Minister of Transport; 1924–1929	Succeeded by Herbert Morrison
