= Bowden House, Berkshire =

Listed country house in Berkshire, England

Bowden House
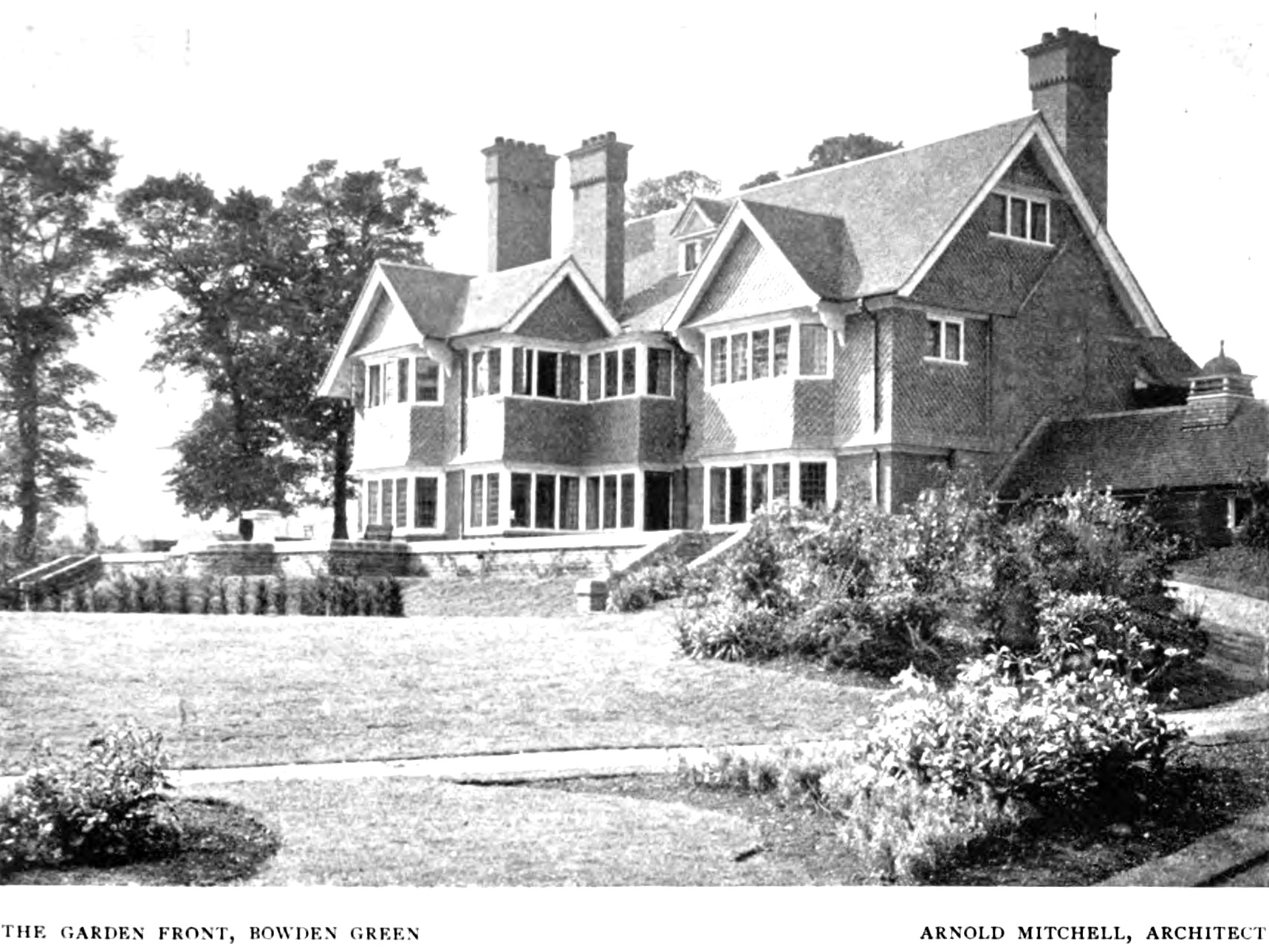
- Bowden House in 1898

- Location within Berkshire
- Former names: Bowden Green; Port Jackson

General information
- Type: Country house
- Architectural style: Domestic Revival, Arts and Crafts, Art Nouveau
- Location: Pangbourne, Berkshire, England
- Coordinates: 51°28′48″N 1°06′54″W
- Year built: 1897–98
- Client: Sir Benjamin Baker

Design and construction
- Architect: Arnold Bidlake Mitchell

Listed Building – Grade II*
- Official name: The Junior School, Pangbourne College
- Designated: 18 June 1984; 41 years ago
- Reference no.: 1288792

Listed Building – Grade II
- Official name: Garden walls, formerly associated with Bowden Green
- Designated: 4 September 2006; 19 years ago
- Reference no.: 1391803

Listed Building – Grade II
- Official name: The Fowl House, formerly associated with Bowden Green
- Designated: 4 September 2006; 19 years ago
- Reference no.: 1391804

Bowden House, previously called both "Bowden Green" and "Port Jackson", is an English country house. It is a historic Grade II* listed building. The house is located southwest of Pangbourne, Berkshire.

== History ==
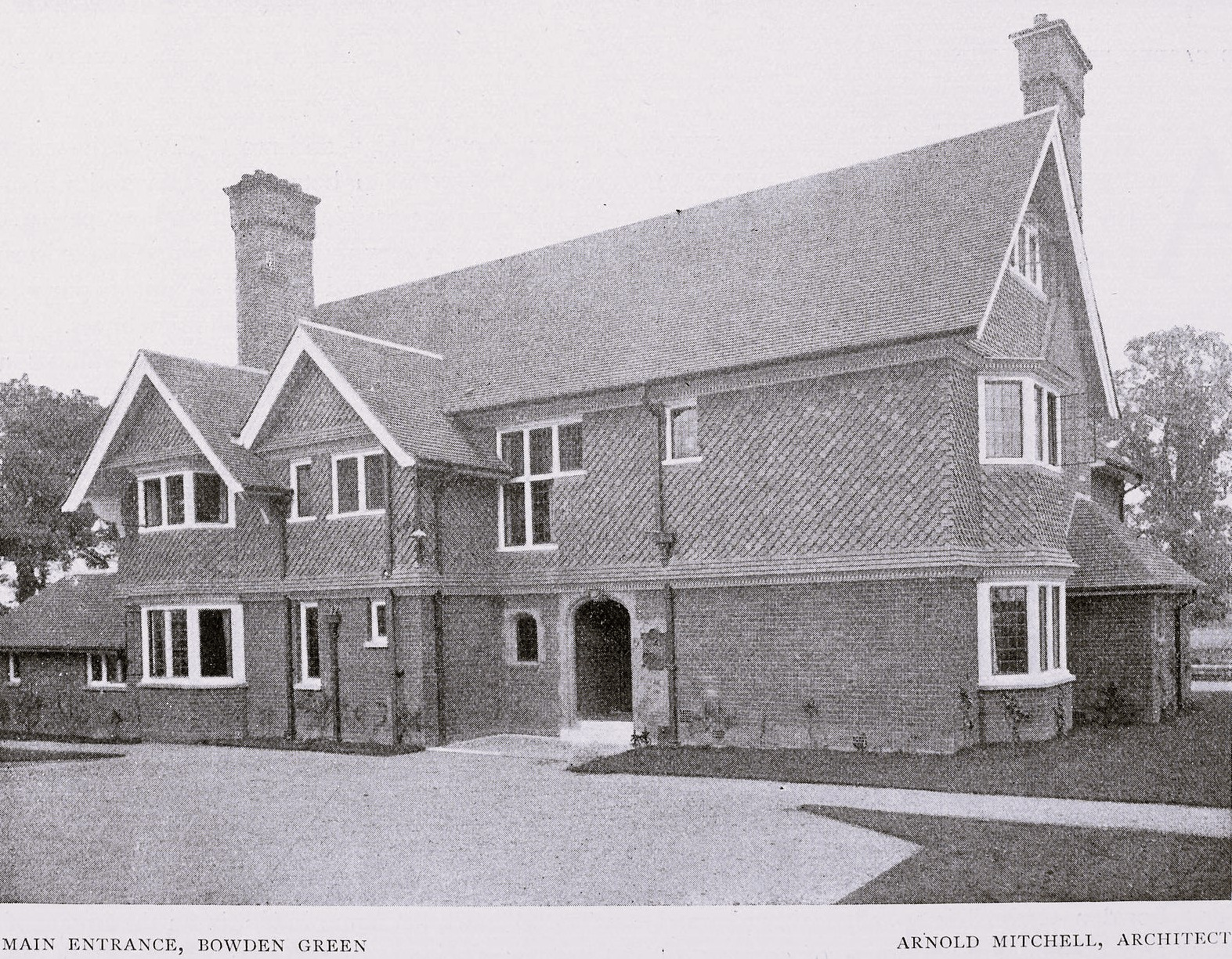
Entrance front, 1898

The house was originally called "Bowden Green" and was built between 1897 and 1898 by architect Arnold Bidlake Mitchell (1863–1944) for the engineer of the Forth Bridge, Sir Benjamin Baker.

When the unmarried Baker died in 1907, the property went to his niece, Mona Spagnoletti, née Kemp, and her husband James Spagnoletti, the son of inventor Charles Spagnoletti, who were already living with Baker.

An addition was made to the west end of the house around 1910, containing a billiards room.

At a later point, Pangbourne College acquired the property and used it as a junior school and dormitory, called "Port Jackson".

In 1984, it was designated a Grade II* listed building.

In 2003, the school built a new building on their main campus to house Port Jackson and offered the house for sale.

== Architecture ==
The house's style is variously described as Domestic Revival, Arts and Crafts, and Vernacular Revival. The exterior is brick, with shaped tiles on the first floor and a multitude of gables. Some of the bay windows are in hamstone.

The "well preserved, cleverly planned interior" contains significant Art Nouveau decorations, including gilded friezes in the hall and dining room. There are De Morgan tiles surrounding the drawing room fireplace.

The property had extensive outbuildings, some of which remain, including the Grade II listed octagonal Fowl-House.

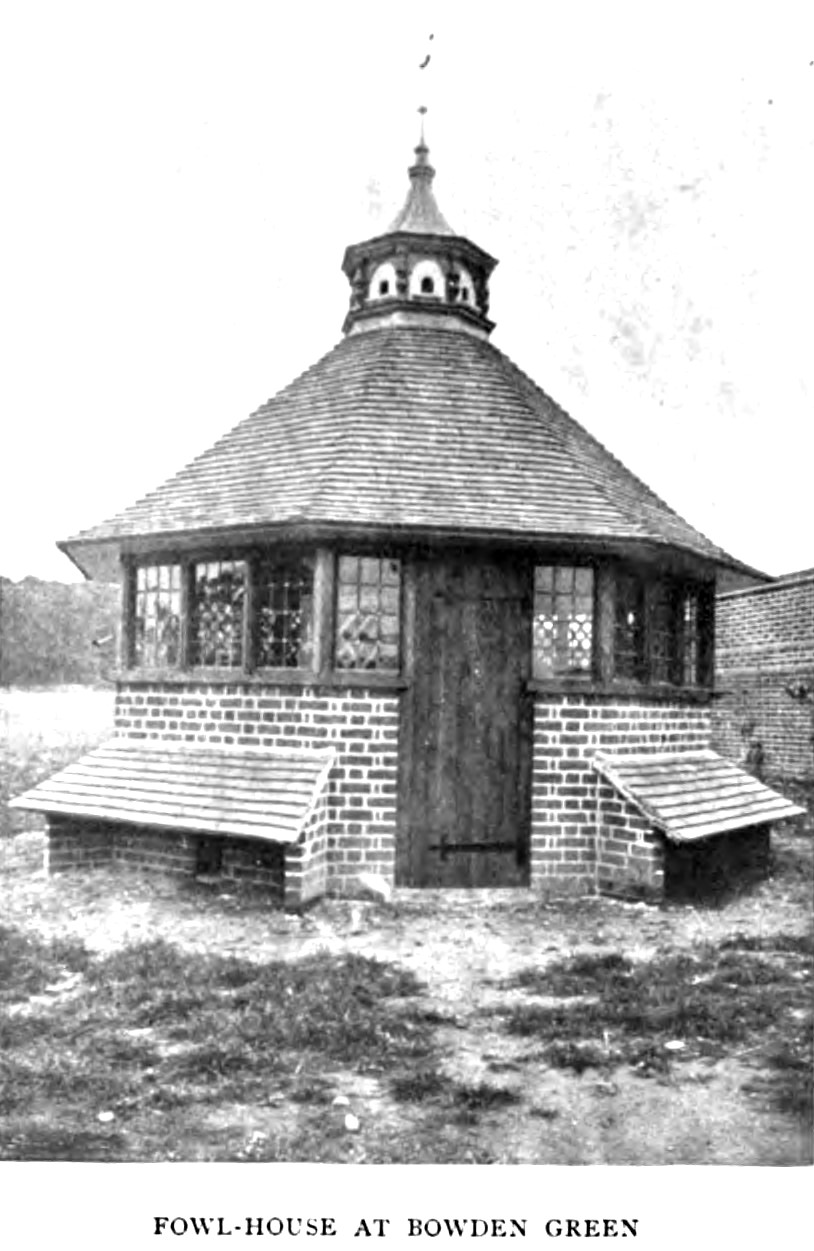
Fowl-House, 1898

== See also ==
- Grade II* listed buildings in Berkshire
