= Mary Cholmondeley, Baroness Delamere =

British socialite (1906–1986)

The Right Honourable The Lady Delamere
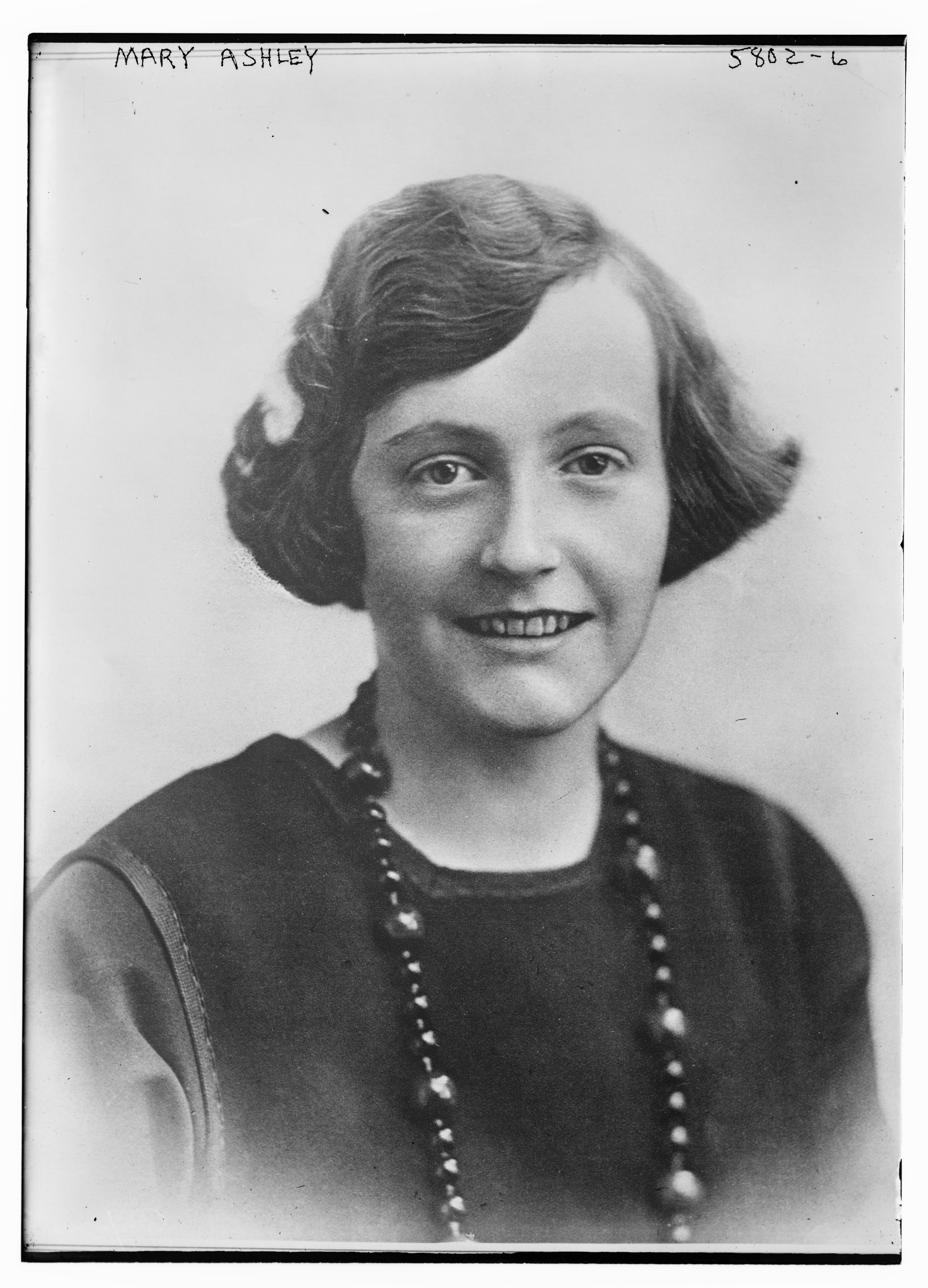
- Lady Delamere in 1922

Personal details
- Born: Ruth Mary Clarisse Ashley; 22 July 1906; Stanmore, London Borough of Harrow, England
- Died: 10 October 1986 (aged 80); Cambridge, Cambridgeshire, England
- Resting place: St George's Churchyard, Six Mile Bottom
- Spouse(s): Alec Cunningham-Reid (m. 1927; div. 1940) Ernest Laurie Gardner (m. 1940; div. 1943) Thomas Cholmondeley, 4th Baron Delamere (m. 1944; div. 1955)
- Children: 2
- Parent: Wilfrid Ashley, 1st Baron Mount Temple

Ruth Mary Clarisse Cholmondeley, Baroness Delamere (née Ashley, formerly Cunningham-Reid and Gardner; 22 July 1906 – 10 October 1986), was a British heiress and socialite. A granddaughter of German-Jewish banker Sir Ernest Cassel, she inherited an estate including a large manor house in Six Mile Bottom and half of her grandfather's fortune (valued at approximately £50 million in 2020). The Cincinnati Enquirer referred to her as "England's wealthiest girl" when reporting on her first marriage to Captain Alec Cunningham-Reid. She was married three times, becoming a peeress upon her third marriage to Thomas Cholmondeley, 4th Baron Delamere. Lady Delamere was the younger sister of Edwina Mountbatten, Countess Mountbatten of Burma.

== Early life and family ==
Lady Delamere was born Ruth Mary Clarisse Ashley on 22 July 1906 in Stanmore. She was the youngest daughter of Colonel Wilfrid Ashley, 1st Baron Mount Temple and Amalia Mary Maud Cassel. Her older sister was Edwina Mountbatten, Countess Mountbatten of Burma. Delamere's paternal grandfather, Evelyn Ashley, was Under-Secretary of State for the Colonies, a Member of Parliament, and the younger son of Anthony Ashley-Cooper, 7th Earl of Shaftesbury. Her maternal grandfather, Sir Ernest Cassel, was a Prussian-born Jewish banker and capitalist who became a British subject and converted to Catholicism. She was a first cousin of Sir Felix Cassel, 1st Baronet.

Delamere's mother died from tuberculosis in 1911, and her father married a second time to Muriel Forbes-Sempill.

She was described by her niece, Lady Pamela Hicks, as "rather excitable" and "flighty".

== Adult life ==
In 1921, Delamere's grandfather, Sir Ernest Cassel, died, leaving her sister and her the majority of his estate (worth around £50 million in 2020). As part of her inheritance, Delamere received Six Mile Bottom Hall, a large Tudor country house in Six Mile Bottom.

On 12 May 1927, she married Captain Alec Cunningham-Reid, a military officer and politician. The couple was described by The Cincinnati Enquirer as "England's wealthiest girl and handsomest man", They had two sons, Michael Duncan Alec Cunningham-Reid and Noel Robert Cunningham-Reid. On their honeymoon, she insisted that they share her wealth because "no decent woman likes to have a man live with her in charity", but when they divorced in 1940, Cunningham-Reid sued for half of her $400,000 annual income.

On 3 September 1940, she married a second time to Major Ernest Laurie Gardner. They divorced in 1943. She married a third time, on 15 June 1944, to Thomas Cholmondeley, 4th Baron Delamere. She and Lord Delamere divorced in 1955.
