= Benjamin Baker (engineer) =

English civil engineer (1840–1907)

Sir Benjamin Baker KCB KCMG FRS FRSE
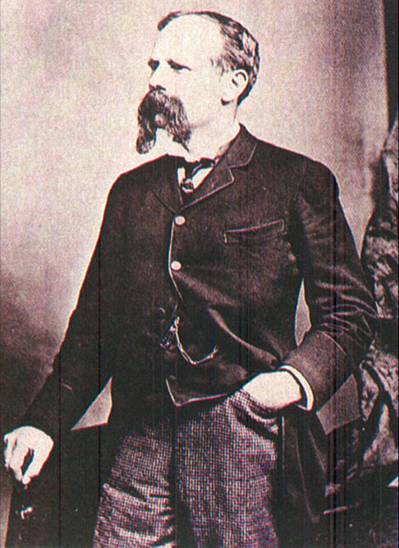
- Benjamin Baker as a young engineer
- Born: 31 March 1840; Frome, Somerset, England
- Died: 19 May 1907 (aged 67); Pangbourne, Berkshire, England
- Education: Apprenticed to Messrs Price and Fox at the Neath Abbey Iron Works
- Engineering career
- Discipline: Civil engineer Structural engineer
- Projects: Forth Bridge, First Aswan Dam

Sir Benjamin Baker (31 March 1840 – 19 May 1907) was an English civil engineer who worked in mid to late Victorian era. He helped develop the early underground railways in London with Sir John Fowler, but he is best known for his work on the Forth Bridge. He made many other notable contributions to civil engineering, including his work as an expert witness at the public inquiry into the Tay Bridge disaster. Later, he helped design and build the first Aswan Dam.

== Early life and career ==
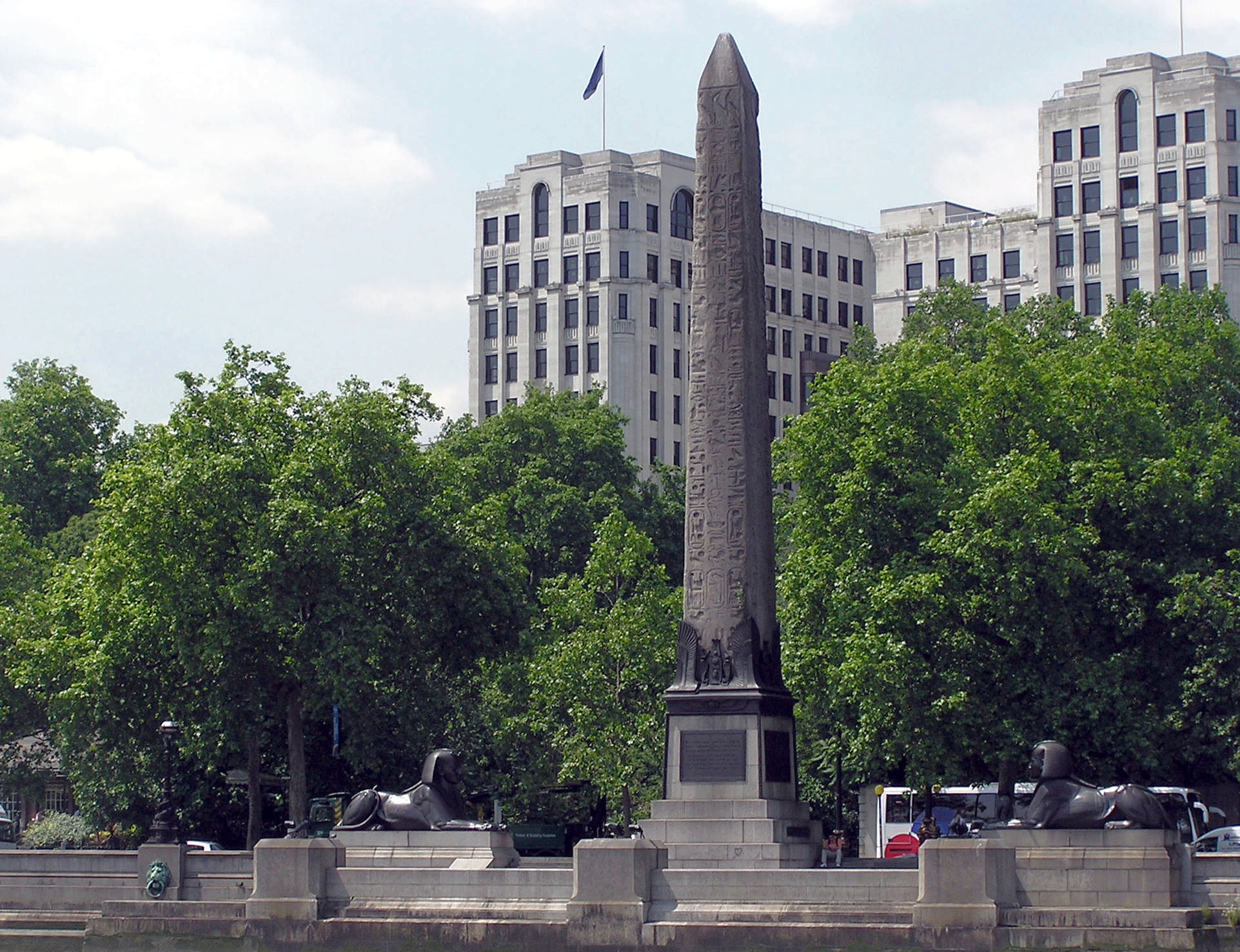
Cleopatra's Needle from the River Thames, London

He was born in Keyford, which is now part of Frome, Somerset in 1840, the son of Benjamin Baker, principal assistant at Tondu Ironworks, and Sarah Hollis. There is a plaque on their house in Butts Hill. He was educated at Cheltenham Grammar School and, at the age of 16, became an apprentice at Messrs Price and Fox at the Neath Abbey Iron Works. After his apprenticeship he spent two years as an assistant to Mr. W.H. Wilson. Later, he became associated with Sir John Fowler in London. He took part in the construction of the Metropolitan Railway (London). He was also a key expert witness in the Tay Bridge disaster of 1879.

He designed the cylindrical vessel in which Cleopatra's Needle, now standing on the Thames Embankment, London, was brought over from Egypt to England in 1877–1878.

He obtained an extremely large professional practice, ranging over almost every branch of civil engineering, and was more or less directly concerned with most of the great engineering achievements of his day.

== Bridges ==
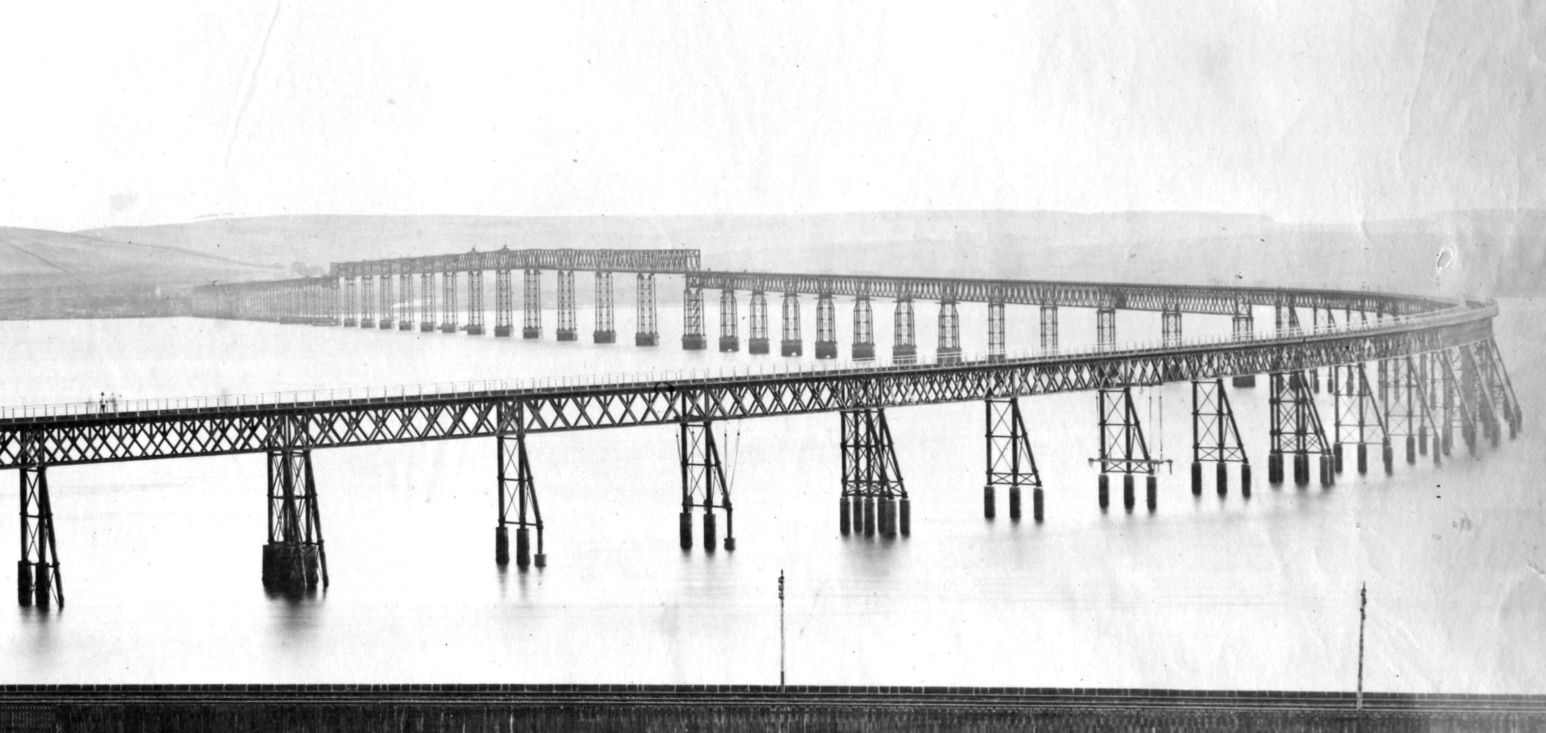
Original Tay Bridge from the north

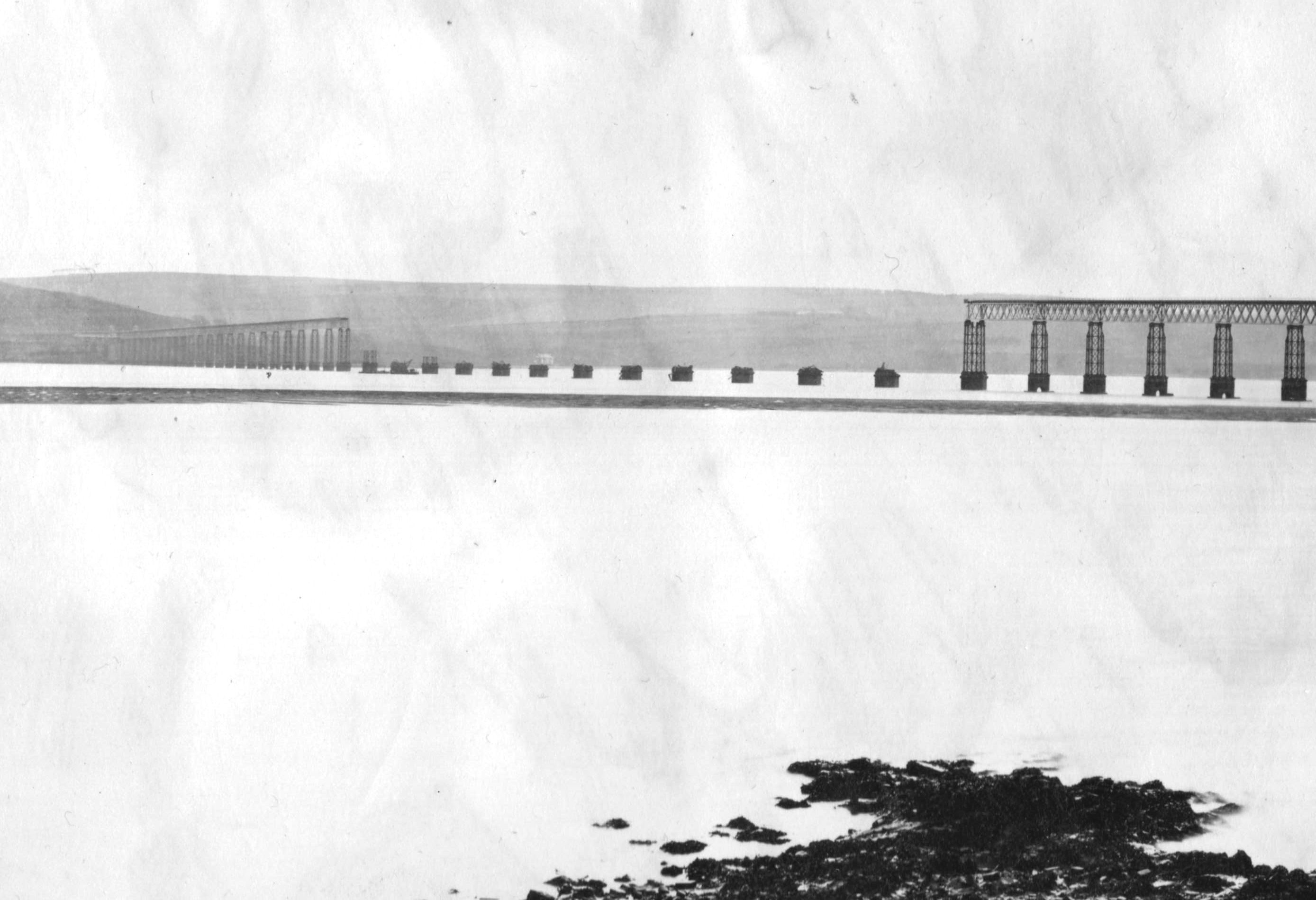
Fallen Tay Bridge from the north

In 1867 he published a timely book on Long Railway Bridges titled Long-Span Railway Bridges which advocated the introduction of steel and showed that much longer spans were possible using this material.

=== Tay bridge disaster ===
In 1880, Baker was called as an expert witness to the inquiry into the Tay Bridge disaster, in which part of the bridge failed and collapsed into the water. Although he was acting on behalf of Thomas Bouch, the builder of the first railway bridge across the Tay, he performed his role with independence and tenacity. His testified against the theory that the bridge was blown over by the wind that night. He made a meticulous survey of structures at or near the bridge, and concluded that wind speeds were not excessive on the night of the disaster. The official analysis of the failure suggested that a wind pressure of over 30 pounds per square foot was needed to cause toppling of the structure. Baker examined smaller structures in the vicinity of the bridge and concluded that the pressure could not have exceeded 15 pounds per square foot on the night of the bridge failure. Such smaller structures included walls, ballast on the track on the bridge, and both signal boxes either on or very near the bridge.

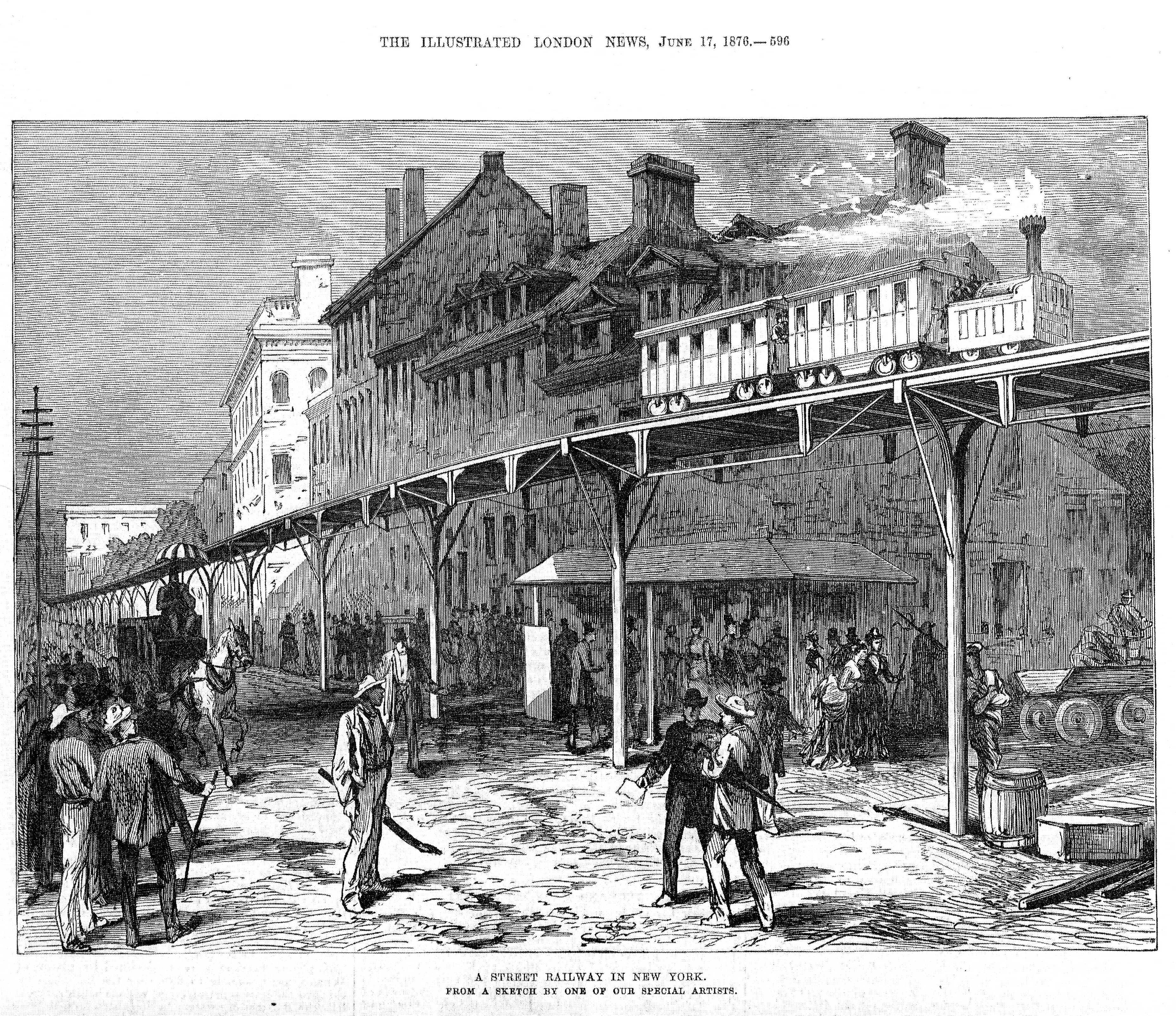
A street railway in New York 1876

Baker said in his statement to the court that he had built over 12 miles (19 km) of railway viaduct.

By this time he had already become established as an authority on bridge construction. Shortly afterwards he was engaged on the work which made his reputation with the general public: the design and erection of the Forth Bridge (1890) in collaboration with Sir John Fowler and William Arrol. It was an almost unique design as a large cantilever bridge, and was built entirely in steel, another unprecedented development in bridge engineering. Stiffness was provided by hollow tubes which were riveted together so as to make sound joints. Baker promoted his design in numerous public lectures, and arranged demonstrations of the stability of the cantilever by using his assistants as stage props.

=== Forth Bridge ===
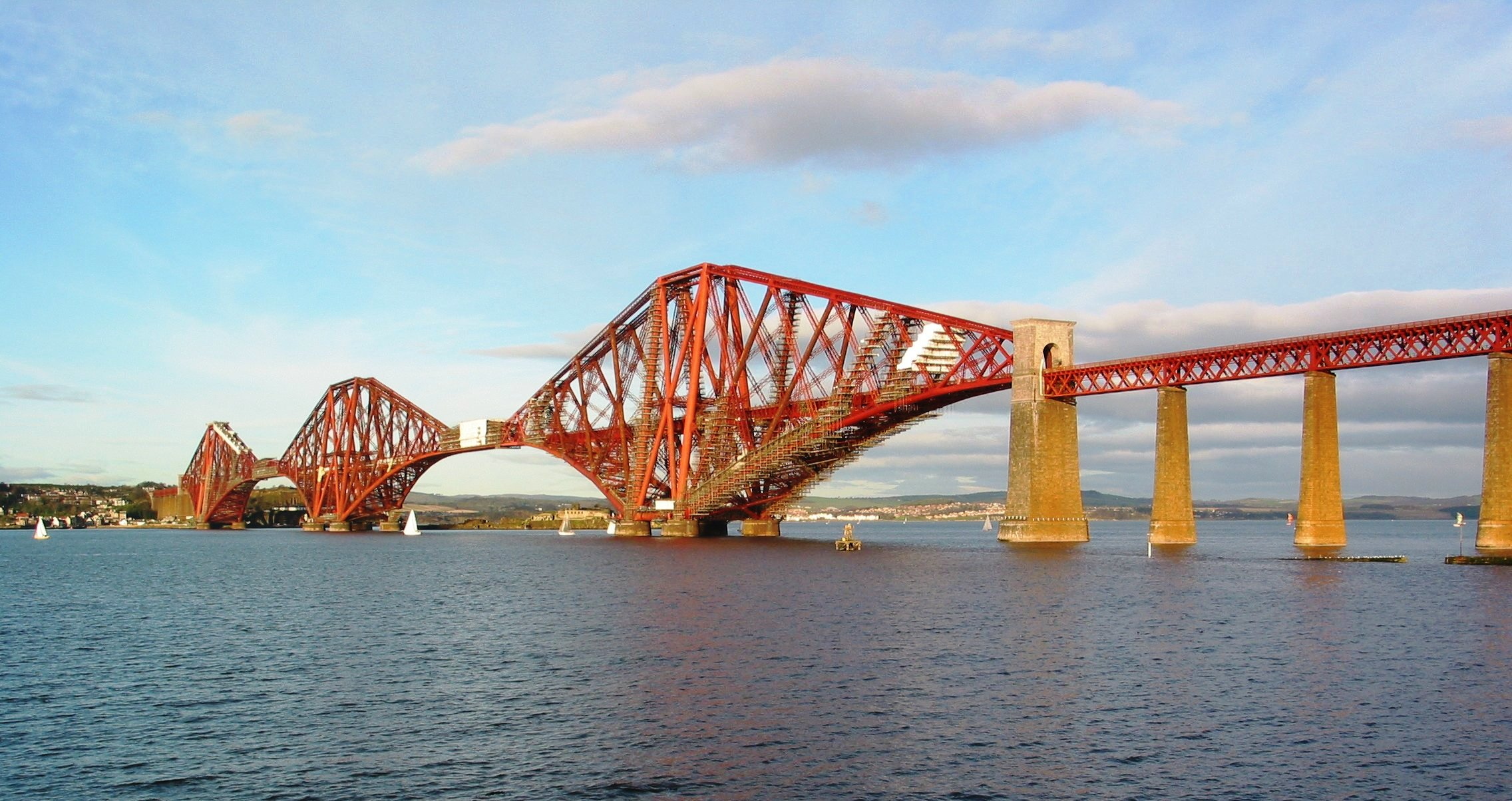
Forth Bridge

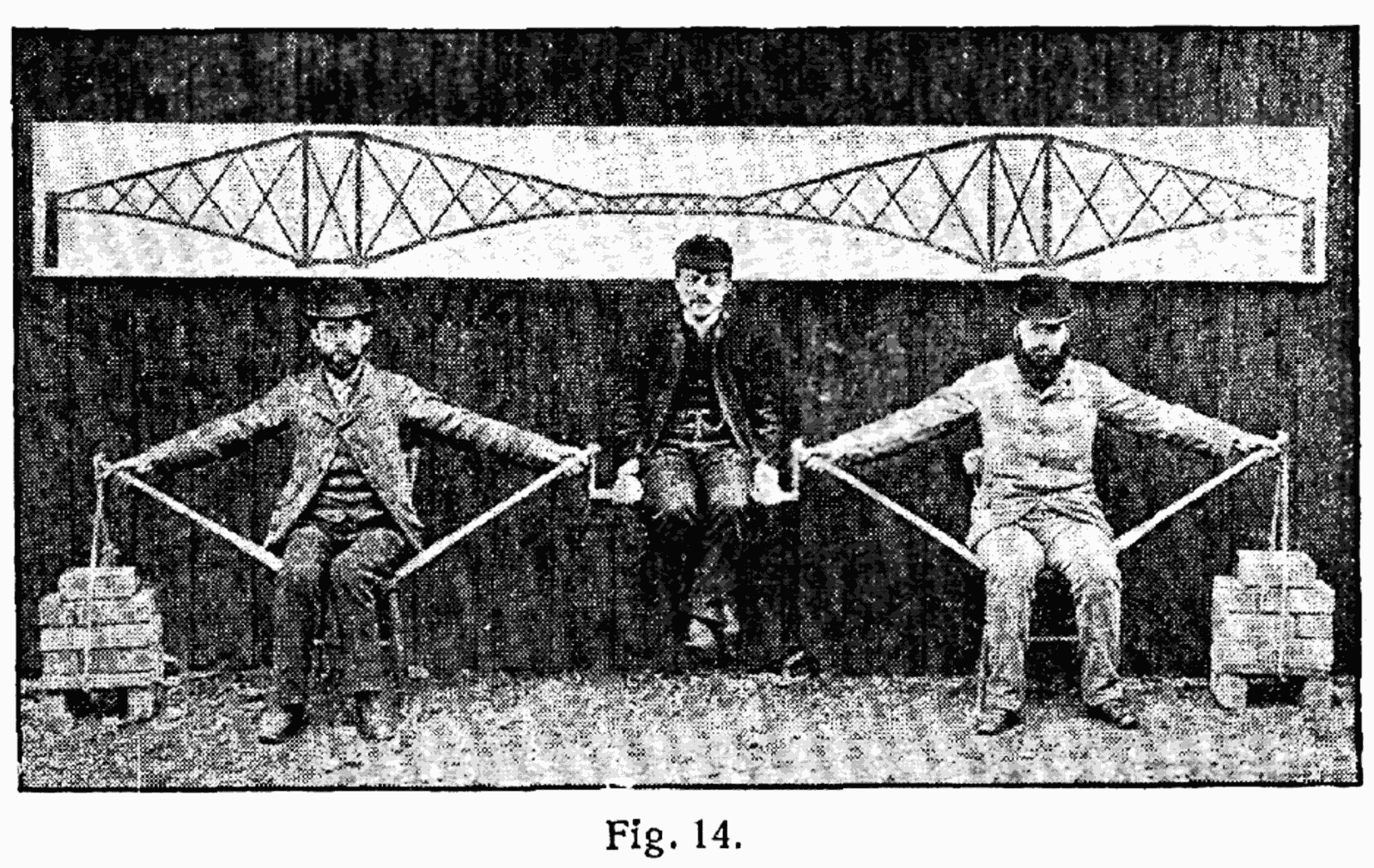
Stability of the cantilever

With Sir John Fowler, he designed and engineered the Forth Bridge after the Tay bridge collapse. It was a cantilever bridge and Baker gave numerous lectures on the principles which lay behind his design. Thomas Bouch had originally been awarded the contract but he lost it after the Tay Bridge Inquiry reported in June 1880. The bridge was built entirely in steel, much stronger than cast iron. He used hollow steel tubes to create the cantilever, and it was then the largest bridge of its kind in the world. The bridge is regarded as an engineering marvel. It is 8,296 ft (2,529 m) in length, and the double track is elevated 151 feet (46 m) above high tide. It consists of two main spans of 1,710 feet (520 m), two side spans of 675 feet (206 m), 15 approach spans of 168 feet (51 m) and five of 25 feet (7.6 m) ).[3] Each main span comprises two 680 ft (210 m) cantilever arms supporting a central 350 ft (110 m) span girder bridge. The three great four-tower cantilever structures are 340 ft (104 m) tall, each 70 ft (21 m) diameter foot resting on a separate foundation. The southern group of foundations had to be constructed as caissons under compressed air, to a depth of 90 ft (27 m). At its peak, approximately 4,600 workers were employed in its construction. Initially, it was recorded that 57 lives were lost however after extensive research by local historians, the figure has been revised upwards to 98. Eight men who fell from the bridge were saved by boats positioned in the river under work areas. More than 55,000 tons of steel were used, as well as 18,122 m^{3} of granite and over eight million rivets. The bridge was opened on 4 March 1890 by the Prince of Wales, later King Edward VII, who drove home the last rivet, which was gold plated and suitably inscribed. A contemporary materials analysis of the bridge, c. 2002, found that the steel in the bridge is of good quality, with little variation.

The use of a cantilever in bridge design was not a new idea, but the scale of Baker's undertaking was a pioneering effort, later followed in different parts of the world. Much of the work done was without precedent, including calculations for incidence of erection stresses, provisions made for reducing future maintenance costs, calculations for wind pressures made evident by the Tay Bridge disaster, the effect of temperature stresses on the structure, and so on.

Where possible, the bridge used natural features such as Inchgarvie, an island, the promontories on either side of the firth at this point, and also the high banks on either side. The remains of Thomas Bouch's first attempts at his bridge can also be seen on the island.

The bridge has a speed limit of 50 mph (80 km/h) for passenger trains and 20 mph (32 km/h) for freight trains. The weight limit for any train on the bridge is 1,422 tonnes (1,442,000 kg) although this is waived for the frequent coal trains, provided two such trains do not simultaneously occupy the bridge. The route availability code is RA8, meaning any current UK locomotive can use the bridge, which was designed to accommodate heavier steam locomotives. Up to 190–200 trains per day crossed the bridge in 2006. A structure like the Forth Bridge needs constant maintenance and the ancillary works for the bridge included not only a maintenance workshop and yard but a railway "colony" of some fifty houses at Dalmeny Station.

== Honours and Old Aswan Dam ==
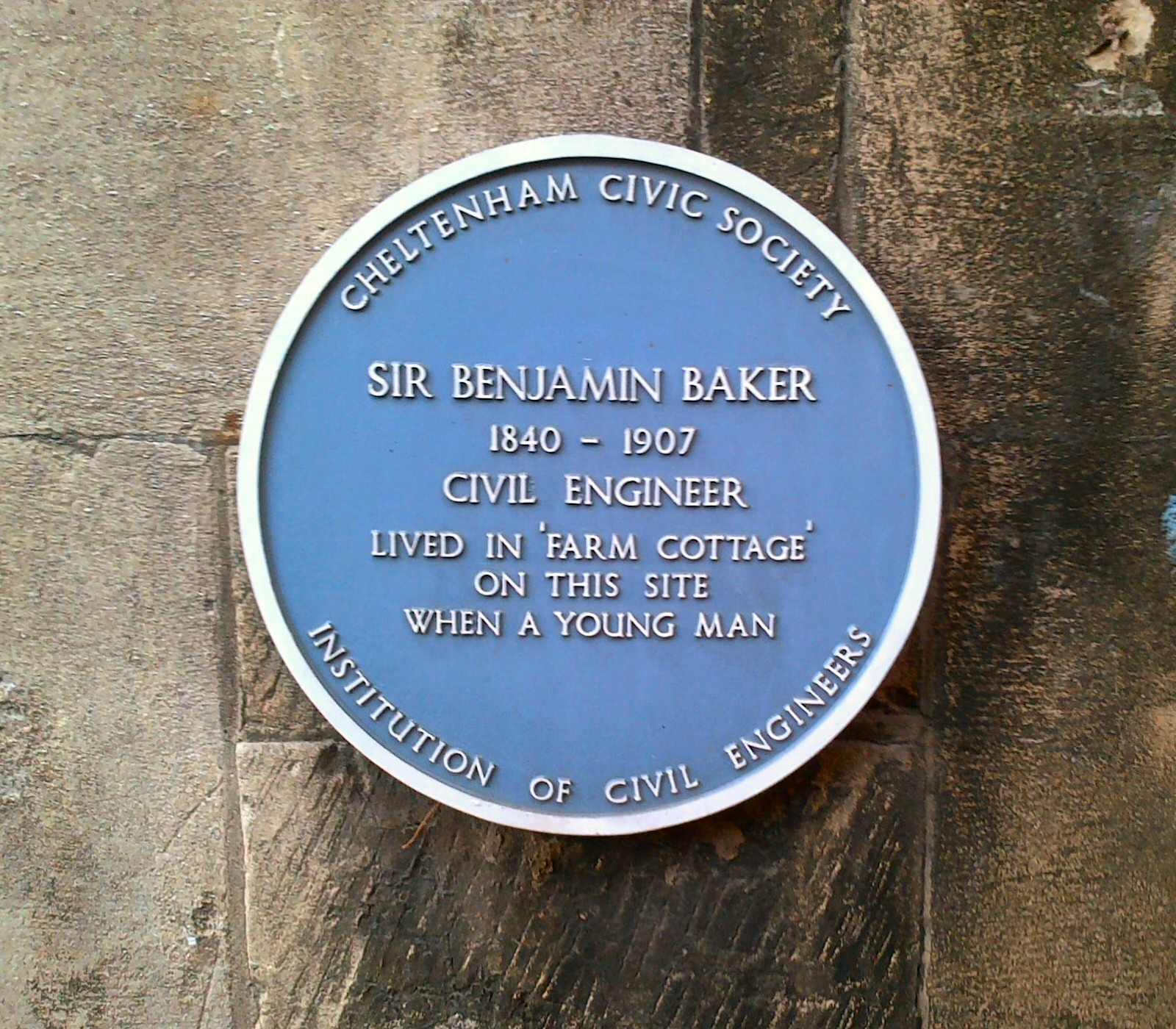
Blue plaque in Cheltenham at the site of Baker's former home

On the completion of this undertaking in 1890 he was appointed Knight Commander of the Order of St Michael and St George (KCMG), and in the same year the Royal Society recognised his scientific attainments by electing him one of its fellows. In 1892 the French Academy of Sciences recognised the work of Fowler and Baker by the joint award of the Poncelet Prize; Baker received 2000 francs because the prize money was doubled. Ten years later at the formal opening of the first Aswan Dam, for which he was consulting engineer, he was appointed Knight Commander of the Order of the Bath (KCB).

Baker served as president of the Institution of Civil Engineers between May 1895 and June 1896. He was elected an honorary member of the American Society of Mechanical Engineers in 1886.

He was elected a Foreign Honorary Member of the American Academy of Arts and Sciences in 1899 and an Honorary Fellow of the Royal Society of Edinburgh in 1902, as well as honorary membership of the Manchester Literary and Philosophical Society.

== Underground railways ==
Baker also played a large part in the introduction of the system widely adopted in London of constructing underground railways in deep tubular tunnels built up of cast iron segments. He was also involved in an unsuccessful scheme in 1899 proposed by the North West London Railway to build a tube line in north-west London.

== Writing ==
Baker was also the author of many papers on engineering subjects. In 1872 Baker wrote a series of articles titled, "The Strength of Brickwork." In these articles Baker argued that the tensile strength of cement should not be neglected in calculating the strength of brickwork. He wrote that if the cement was neglected then several structures of his time should have collapsed.

== Death ==
He died at his home, Bowden Green, in Pangbourne, Berkshire where he lived in his later years and was buried in the village of Idbury in Oxfordshire, next to his mother. He is commemorated in a stained glass window on the northside of the nave at Westminster Abbey.

Professional and academic associations
Preceded by Robert Rawlinson	President of the Institution of Civil Engineers; May 1895 – June 1896	Succeeded by John Wolfe-Barry
