= 26 Upper Brook Street =

Historic house in Mayfair, London

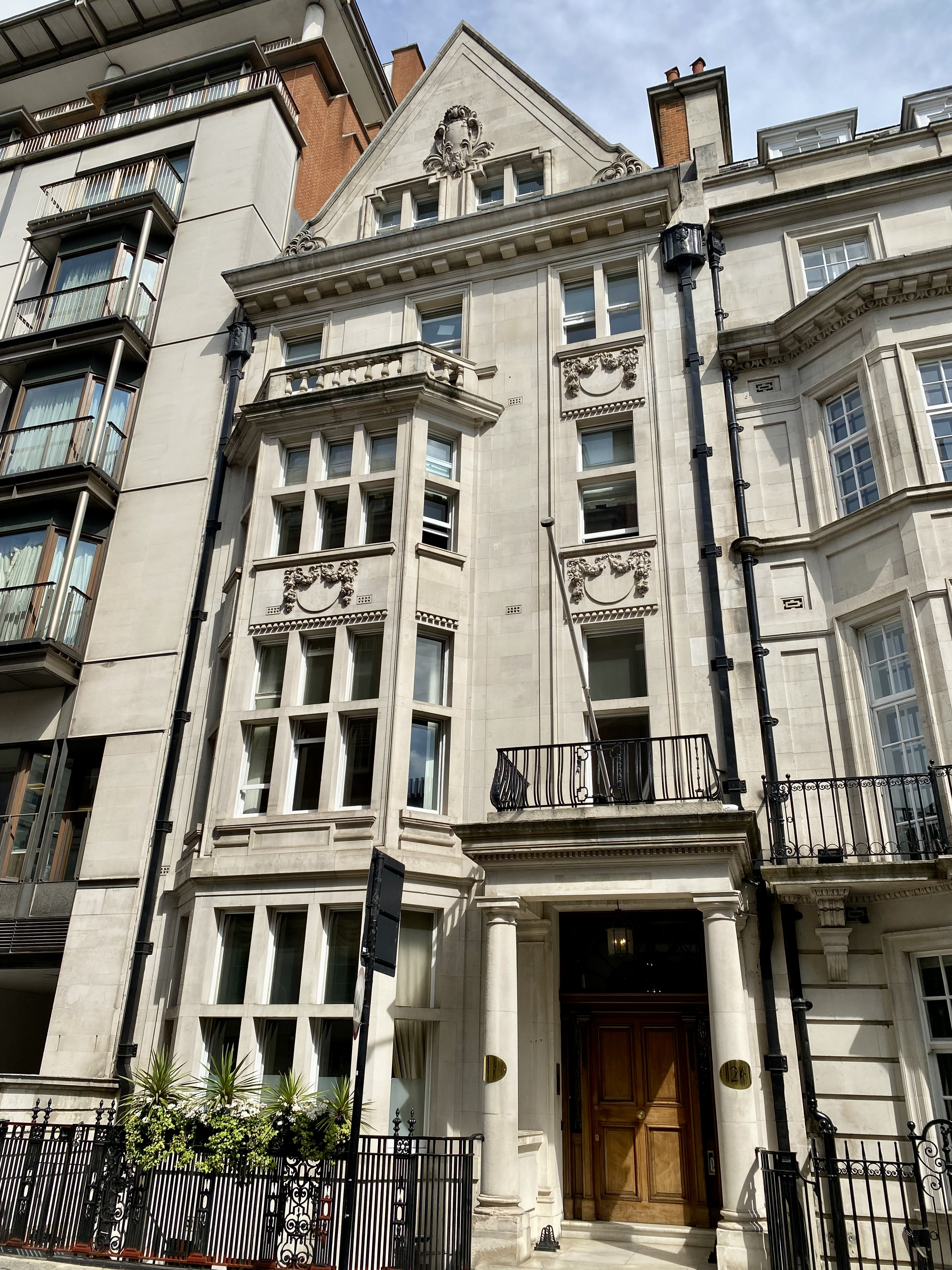

General information
- Type: Residential
- Location: Mayfair, London England
- Coordinates: 51°30′41″N 0°09′24″W
- Completed: 1909

Design and construction
- Architect: Arnold Mitchell

Listed Building – Grade II
- Official name: Number 26 and Attached Railings
- Designated: 15 February 1991
- Reference no.: 1248488

26 Upper Brook Street is a Grade II listed building and former townhouse on Upper Brook Street in Mayfair, London. The area had previously been developed by the Grosvenor Estate, with the current building being completed in 1909 with architect Arnold Mitchell for James Monro Coats.

== History ==
A house stood on the site of 26 Upper Brook Street and was first leased in 1746. In 1808-1810 the house was largely remodeled under the tenant at the time Robert Deverell. Further additions were made in 1818 and 1846. The address on Upper Brook Street was considered fashionable, and the house's occupants included various members of the nobility in the 18th and early 19th centuries such as Francis Haskins Eyles-Stiles, 3rd Baront, Henry Paget, 2nd Earl of Uxbridge and Charles Bennet, 5th Earl of Tankerville. Other notable residents include Moore Disney, George Hamilton Roe, Sir Edward Hulse, 6th Baronet.

The current house was built between 1908–1909, designed by Arnold Mitchell.

In 2026, the building was put up for sale once again as a residential property, being advertised as previously belonging to the family of Jacqueline Kennedy through James Monro Coats.

== Description ==
26 Upper Brook Street is Grade II listed as a good example of a grand Edwardian terraced townhouse. The facade is built in Portland stone with a doric portico and steeply pedimented slate roof. There are also canted bay windows rising to the second floor, a cast-iron first-floor balcony, and a modillion cornice beneath a stone pediment. The house is of four storeys with an attic and basement.

The interior retains an elaborate Edwardian classical scheme, with Neo-Adam and Neo-Rococo rooms, marble fireplaces and a plasterwork frieze.

== See also ==
- 21 Upper Grosvenor Street
- 25 Upper Brook Street
- 33 Upper Brook Street
