= Arnold Mitchell (architect) =

English architect (1863–1944)

Arnold Bidlake Mitchell (1863–1944) was an English architect. He was born in Clapton, Middlesex, now an area in London and established a career in London at a young age.

== Career ==
Mitchell first worked under Robert Stark Wilkinson in 1880, and later Ernest George and Harold Peto of George & Peto, and finally Frank Thomas Baggallay. He served as Clerk of the Works at St. Luke's, a now demolished church in Bermondsey. He largely worked with country houses in the Arts and Crafts style. Mitchell earned various foreign commissions including from the King of Belgium.

Mitchell's designs were exhibited at the Royal Academy.

=== Awards & Honours ===
In 1887, he was elected Associate of the Royal Institute of British Architects, and later in 1894 became Fellow of the Royal Institute of British Architects. He also received the Soane Medallion in 1885, the RIBA Silver Medal for measured drawings in 1886, and later the AA Silver Medal in 1888.

In 1900, Mitchell was listed by Hermann Muthesius as a "distinguished house architect" in the context of contemporary British architecture.

=== Lott's Bricks ===
Arnold Mitchell was closely associated with the early design of "Lott's Bricks", a British artificial-stone construction toy introduced in 1911 which was largely similar to an earlier German version of "anchor" blocks. Mitchell designed a number of the buildings illustrated on the box lids, with many of these works influenced by the Arts and Crafts character of Mitchell's style. Several of the toy designs reflected Mitchell's own architectural work, including a simplified version of his Daily Mail prize-winning 1908 design of Ideal Home.

== Selected works ==
The following is a list of buildings which Mitchell designed or worked on.

- 1898: Bowden House
- 1901: Tissington Hall
- 1903: Oceania, West Parade, Bexhill-on-Sea
- 1903-1905: Maesycrugiau Manor
- 1905: Barnett Hill
- 1907: Brook House
- 1909: 26 Upper Brook Street
- 1907: University College School
- 1925: 40-50 Berkeley Street
- 1927: The May Fair Hotel
