= Muriel Ashley, Baroness Mount Temple =

British aristocrat

The Right Honourable The Lady Mount Temple
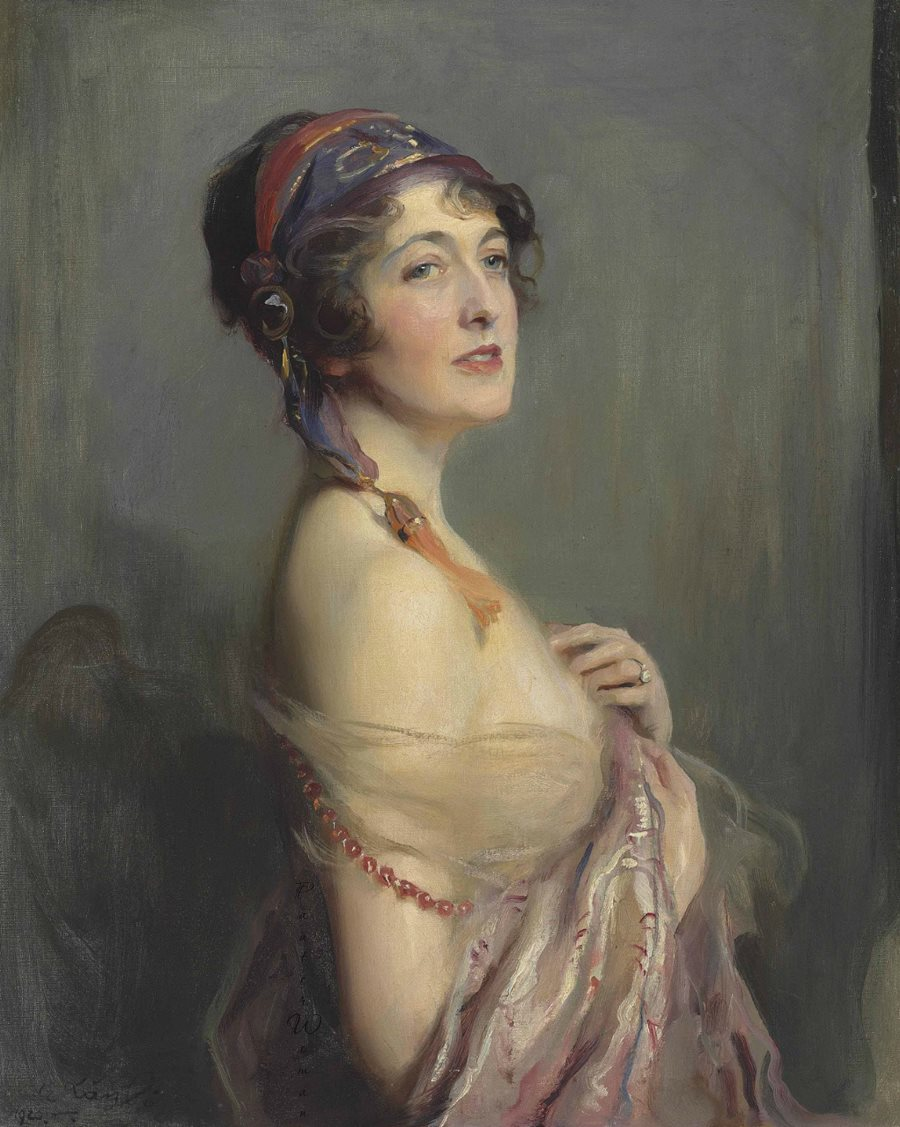
- 1920 Portrait of Ashley by Philip de László

Personal details
- Born: Muriel Emily Spencer; 1881
- Died: 24 June 1954 (aged 72–73)
- Spouse(s): Arthur Forbes-Sempill (m. 1903; div. 1914) Wilfrid Ashley, 1st Baron Mount Temple (m. 1914)
- Parent(s): Walter Spencer; Anne Hudson

Muriel Emily Ashley, Baroness Mount Temple (née Spencer, formerly The Hon. Mrs. Arthur Forbes-Sempill; 1881 – 24 June 1954), also known as Molly Mountemple, was a British aristocrat. She was first married to Arthur Forbes-Sempill, a military officer and younger son of William Forbes-Sempill, 17th Lord Sempill. After their divorce in 1914, she married Wilfrid Ashley, who would later be created Baron Mount Temple in 1932. As the wife of Lord Mount Temple, she was the stepmother of Edwina Mountbatten, Countess Mountbatten of Burma and Mary Cholmondeley, Baroness Delamere. She was unpopular with her stepchildren, and described as "wicked" and "unkind" by friends of the family. She managed the family's estate Broadlands and two London town houses in Westminster. A bathroom in their second town house, done in the Art Deco style, was called "Lady Mount Temple's Crystal Palace" by the British press.

== Biography ==
Lady Mount Temple was born Muriel Emily Spencer, the daughter of Rev. Walter Spencer of Fownhope Court, Herefordshire and Anne Elizabeth Hudson of Bache Hall. Her sister, Margery, was the wife of Hamar Greenwood, 1st Viscount Greenwood. She also had a sister named Olive and two brothers named Robert and Geoffrey. Lady Mount Temple's maternal grandfather was the businessman Robert Spear Hudson.

She married Rear-Admiral The Honourable Arthur Forbes-Sempill, the son of William Forbes-Sempill, 17th Lord Sempill and a grandson of Sir Robert Abercromby, 5th Baronet, on 25 November 1903. They divorced in 1914 on the grounds of adultery; the case was not defended.

On 29 August 1914 she married a second time, to Lieutenant-Colonel Wilfrid Ashley, who was a grandson of Anthony Ashley-Cooper, 7th Earl of Shaftesbury. On 13 January 1932 her husband was elevated to the peerage, becoming Baron Mount Temple. From that time on, she was styled as "Lady Mount Temple". The couple had no children, but she became the stepmother of Lord Mount Temple's two daughters, Edwina and Mary, from his first marriage to Amalia Mary Maud Cassel. She insisted on being addressed as "Madre" by her stepdaughters, and fired their governess soon after marrying their father. Lady Mount Temple reportedly did not have a good relationship with her stepchildren, and sent them off to boarding schools. She was not well-liked by the family and friends of her husband. She was described as "most unkind" by a friend of Edwina's and was called "a wicked woman" and "a real bitch" by Louis Mountbatten, 1st Earl Mountbatten of Burma, her stepson-in-law.

Lady Mount Temple and her husband commissioned the architect Oliver Hill to design two Westminster town houses, naming them both Gayfere House. Their first house, built at 12 Gayfere Street (1923–26), had a drawing room completely decorated with gold leaf. The second house, at the corner of Gayfere Street and Great Peter Street (1929–32), was decorated in the Art Deco style, with mirrored walls and ceilings. The bathroom in their second town house was called "Lady Mount Temple's Crystal Palace" by the press. The family also owned Classiebawn Castle on the west coast of Ireland and Broadlands in Hampshire.

She was an accomplished interior decorator.

She was the second president of the Electrical Association for Women, succeeding Nancy Astor and holding the role from 1928 until 1931.
