= Brook House (Park Lane) =

Block of flats in Mayfair, London

Coordinates: 51°30′40.8″N 0°9′25.3″W

- Interactive map of the Brook House area

General information
- Type: Apartment block (formerly Mansion)
- Architectural style: French (1860s); Neo-Georgian (1930s); modern (1990s)
- Location: Mayfair, London, 113 Park Lane, London W1
- Named for: Upper Brook Street
- Year built: 1867–1869
- Completed: 1998 (Current structure)

Technical details
- Floor count: 8

Design and construction
- Architects: Thomas Henry Wyatt (Original); Arnold Mitchell (1900s); Gee, Walker and Slater Ltd (1930s)
- Developer: Brook House Developments Ltd (1998)
- Main contractor: Higgs and Hill (1998)
- Known for: Residence of Sir Ernest Cassel and the Mountbattens

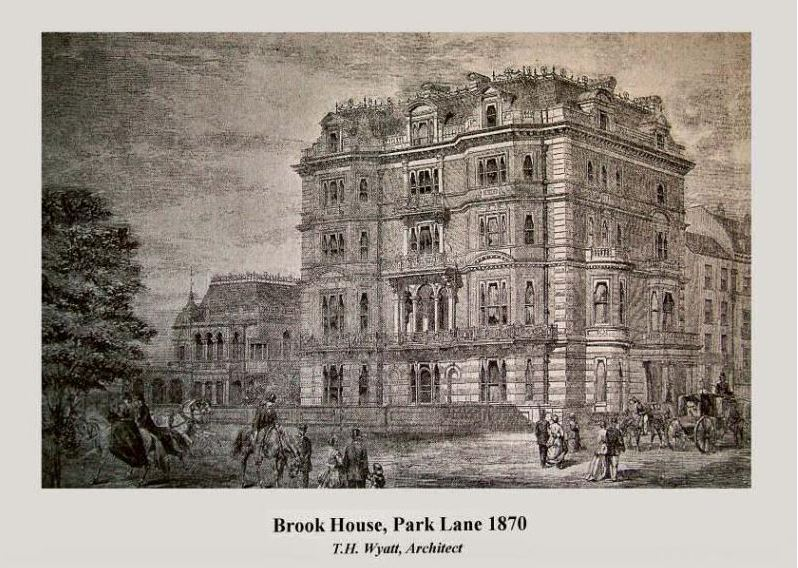
Brook House 113 Park Lane in Mayfair, London as it appeared in 1870, with its French façade before its 1933 remodel to Georgian style

Brook House was a mansion and is now a block of flats in Mayfair, a prestigious and expensive district of central London. The building is located at 113 Park Lane and was constructed by Thomas Henry Wyatt from 1867 to 1869. It was the home of Edward VII's private banker Sir Ernest Cassel and his granddaughter, who became Edwina Mountbatten, Countess Mountbatten of Burma. Upon his death in 1921, she inherited it, and a decade later had it remodelled into flats. At the end of the 20th century the property was rebuilt once more.

== 1860s building ==
In 1854, Dudley Marjoribanks, MP (later created, in 1880, The 1st Baron Tweedmouth), purchased the lot on the corner, which was numbered 29. A decade later, he acquired the adjacent lot numbered 28 and sought permission to build a mansion overlooking Hyde Park, based upon designs from Thomas Henry Wyatt. Construction began in 1867 and completed in 1869 on the large red brick structure with Portland stone dressings. The house had French façades, and a number of bays and balconies. The interior from the entrance on Upper Brook Street opened to a mahogany staircase that rose two stories, lined in variegated marble. The library was furnished in cherry paneling and the dining room was decorated with carving from the recently demolished Draper's Hall.

After the death of The 1st Baron Tweedmouth, the 2nd Baron added a porch to the house where lot 27 had been. A reversal in his financial situation caused him to sell the house in 1904.

== 1900s renovations ==
Ernest Cassel not only bought Brook House, but he also bought the Baron's Scottish estate at Guisachan, near Glen Affric. Between 1905 and 1907, Cassel carried out renovations to the property designed by architect Arnold Mitchell and built by the firm of Holland and Hannen. The interiors were done by Charles Allom, decorator for the Royal Family. The house had 24 bedrooms, 11 reception rooms, a sixty-foot-long ballroom, a grand dining room which had seating for 100 guests, and 800 tons of Tuscan marble in the main hall and staircase alone.

Cassel's granddaughter, who would later become Edwina, Countess Mountbatten of Burma, from the time she was a child and her mother died, had a room in his home. Upon Cassel's death, the house passed to his sister, Wilhelmina Cassel, but Edwina continued to live there. She and Louis Mountbatten, 1st Earl Mountbatten of Burma married in a lavish ceremony in 1922 with the Prince of Wales serving as best man and his parents, George V and Mary of Teck, in attendance. After the ceremony, the reception was held in Brook House and the couple moved into a suite on the third floor. When Wilhelmina Cassel died in 1925, the house became Edwina's outright and the newlyweds remodeled Brook House with a naval motif. The master bedroom was designed like the cabin of a battleship, complete with portholes, cork-lined ceiling and brass handrails.

== 1930s remodelling ==
In 1931, Edwina put the house up for sale, citing high taxes and the cost to maintain the property, but there were some problems with the will, forcing delays. George Gee of the building firm Gee, Walker and Slater Ltd, bought the major interest and the house was mostly demolished and rebuilt in 1933–35 with neo-Georgian designs similar to the neighboring houses. Each floor had a single flat. The Mountbattens' double-story penthouse was not completed until 1937 and could only be reached by a private, express elevator. The lower flats began being rented out and one of the early occupants was Harry Selfridge, who had a flat there in 1936.

== 1998 building ==
In 1998, a demolition and renovation was completed on the property by contractors Higgs and Hill for Brook House Developments Ltd. Upon completion, the property contained basement parking, commercial space on the ground and first floors, 16 luxury apartments and a single penthouse occupying the seventh and eighth floors.
