= Moulton Paddocks =

Racing colours of Godolphin

Moulton Paddocks is a racing stable in Newmarket, Suffolk, UK operated by Godolphin Racing. It is said to have the capacity for around 200 horses, many of which are of extremely high quality. The stable is currently run by Charlie Appleby.

== History of the Moulton Paddocks estate, Suffolk ==
At one time Moulton Paddocks was known as Fidget Hall, a possible reference to Sam Chifney's Fidget Farm of 70 acres (28 ha) situated at the extremity of the Bury Hill gallop. He named the farm after the sire of a horse he had ridden when young. Owners of Moulton Paddocks have since included: Sir Robert Pigot, Lord William Cansfield Gerard, George Alexander Baird, Sir Ernest Cassel and Solly Joel.

In 1841 Fidget Hall was 64 acres (26 ha) and owned by George Samuel Ford, known in the racing fraternity as "Lawyer Ford". He was a financier to gentlemen and noblemen in distress, and one of the creditors of the bankrupt trainer Will Chifney - brother of Sam. Ford was passionately fond of racing: his horse Poison won the 1843 Oaks and Guaracha won the Coronation Stakes in 1846.

In 1842 William Webber, surgeon and founder of the Norwich Royal Free Hospital for Incurables, owned Fidget Hall. He carried out extensive building work on the property and increased the size of the estate to 313 acres (127 ha). During this period the name changed from Fidget Hall to Moulton Paddocks. Webber bred race horses and in 1842 the stallion Erymus stood at Moulton Paddocks but died there in January 1847. In 1849 Sir Robert Pigot leased the property from Webber; two of his children were later born there in 1850 and 1852.

Mr Willingham Franklin purchased Moulton Paddocks from Webber in 1857, but sold in 1859 (shortly before he died). Franklin, described as “barrister not in practice”, was the only son of Sir Willingham Franklin (a judge in the supreme court at Madras) and nephew of explorer John Franklin. In 1861 the property was occupied by Captain Astley Paston Cooper, who inherited a baronetcy in 1866 when his father -Sir Astley Paston Cooper, 2nd Baronet - died.

From the early 1860s, Moulton Paddocks belonged to the Fryer family. They more than doubled the area of land and improved the house before selling to Lord Gerard in 1885. In 1889 Gerard leased the great horse Ormonde from the Duke of Westminster to stand at Moulton Paddocks. However, the horse was ill and the fertility of the animal so poor that only one foal resulted.

Gerard sold Moulton Paddocks to George Alexander Baird in 1892 who moved his stud from Kentford. It was thought that he would also move his Bedford Lodge operation to Moulton Paddocks, but he died the following year. Lillie Langtry the actress was in a relationship with Baird at this time and she would have stayed at Moulton Paddocks. Langtry had a small number of horses in training at Baird's stable and after his death moved them to Kentford - about 3 miles (5 km) from Moulton Paddocks. She gradually became more interested in racing, purchased additional horses, and in 1895 bought a house in Kentford called Regal Lodge.

Baird's executors let Moulton Paddocks on short leases until they found a buyer, and in 1899 Ernest Cassel took ownership. Cassel had become financial adviser to the Prince of Wales in 1897 and the two developed a close friendship. In 1892, the Prince had been persuaded by his racing manager to move his horses from John Porter’s stables at Kingsclere to those of Richard Marsh at Newmarket. This new arrangement was convenient for the royal residence of Sandringham House and when Cassel purchased Moulton Paddocks the Prince (and later when he was Edward VII) became a frequent visitor. By the time of Cassel's death in 1921, the Moulton Paddocks estate had been expanded to 1,300 acres (530 ha).

Solly Joel became the owner in 1922 after the death of Cassel. He and his brother Jack Joel had a long running rivalry on the turf as owners, with Jack having the greater success over the years. When Solly purchased Moulton Paddocks, he already had a well established stud at Maiden Erlegh near Reading, Berkshire. He used the stables at Moulton Paddocks to train under Walter Earl. When Joel died in 1931 the estate passed to his son Dudley. After his death in 1941 the house fell into dis-repair and by 1950 had been demolished.
