= Ernest Cassel =

British businessman (1852–1921)

The Right Honourable Sir Ernest Cassel GCB GCMG GCVO
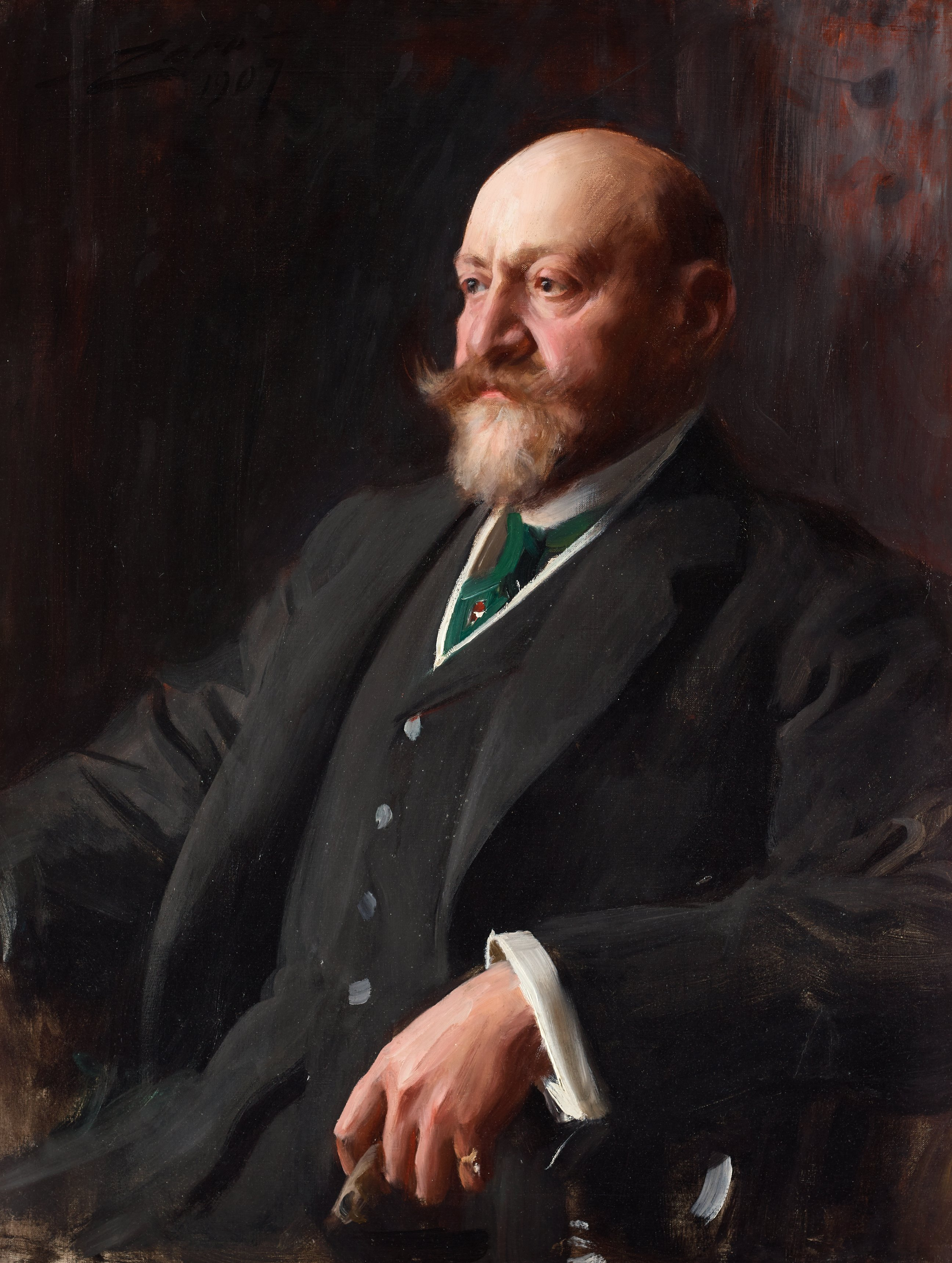
- Painted by Anders Zorn, 1906
- Born: Ernest Joseph Cassel; 3 March 1852; Cologne, Prussia
- Died: 21 September 1921 (aged 69); Brook House, Park Lane, London, England
- Resting place: Kensal Green Cemetery, London, England
- Occupation: Merchant banker
- Spouse: Annette Mary Maud Maxwell (m. 1878–1881)
- Children: Amalia Mary Maud Cassel
- Parent(s): Jacob Cassel; Amalia Rosenheim

Sir Ernest Joseph Cassel (3 March 1852 – 21 September 1921) was a British merchant banker and businessman. Born and raised in Prussia, he moved to England at the age of 17.

== Life and career ==
Cassel was born in Cologne, in the Rhine Province of the Kingdom of Prussia (now part of Germany), the son of Amalia (née Rosenheim) and Jacob Cassel. His family were Ashkenazi Jews. His father owned a small bank, but the son Ernest arrived penniless in Liverpool, England in 1869. There he found employment with a firm of grain merchants. With an enormous capacity for hard work and a strong business sense, Cassel was soon in Paris working for a bank. Being of Prussian origin, the Franco-Prussian War forced him to move to a position in a London bank. He prospered, and was soon putting together his own financial deals.

His areas of interest were in mining, infrastructure and heavy industry. Turkey was an early area of business ventures, but he soon had large interests in Sweden, the United States, South America, South Africa, and Egypt. He was among the financiers of the Aswan Dam, built in Egypt between 1899 and 1902, and was present in Egypt at the opening of the dam in December 1902.

At the behest of the French and British governments, he reluctantly provided assistance for the establishment of the State Bank of Morocco, provided for in the terms of the 1906 Treaty of Algeciras.

In 1912 his close German friend Albert Ballin feared that the naval rivalry between Britain and Germany was getting out of hand and even threatened war. They approached their respective governments, who agreed to negotiate a compromise that would end the race through the Haldane Mission of 1912. Unfortunately, it proved a failure.

One of the wealthiest men of his day, Cassel was a good friend of King Edward VII (enough so that he was nicknamed "Windsor Cassel"), prime minister H. H. Asquith and Winston Churchill. As a foreign-born arriviste of Jewish background, he was less than popular with elements of the British upper classes.

== Retirement ==
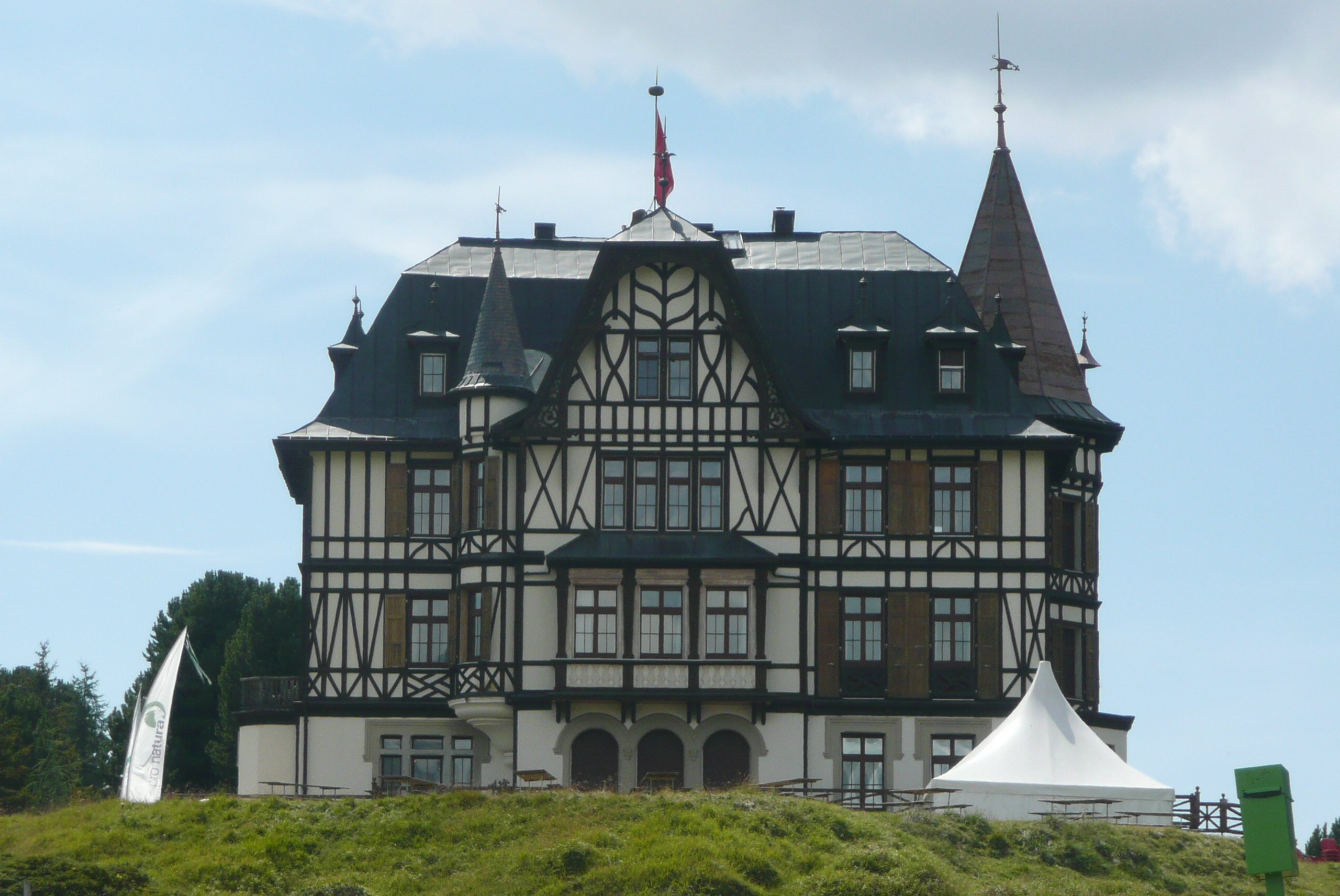
Villa Cassel at Riederalp, Switzerland

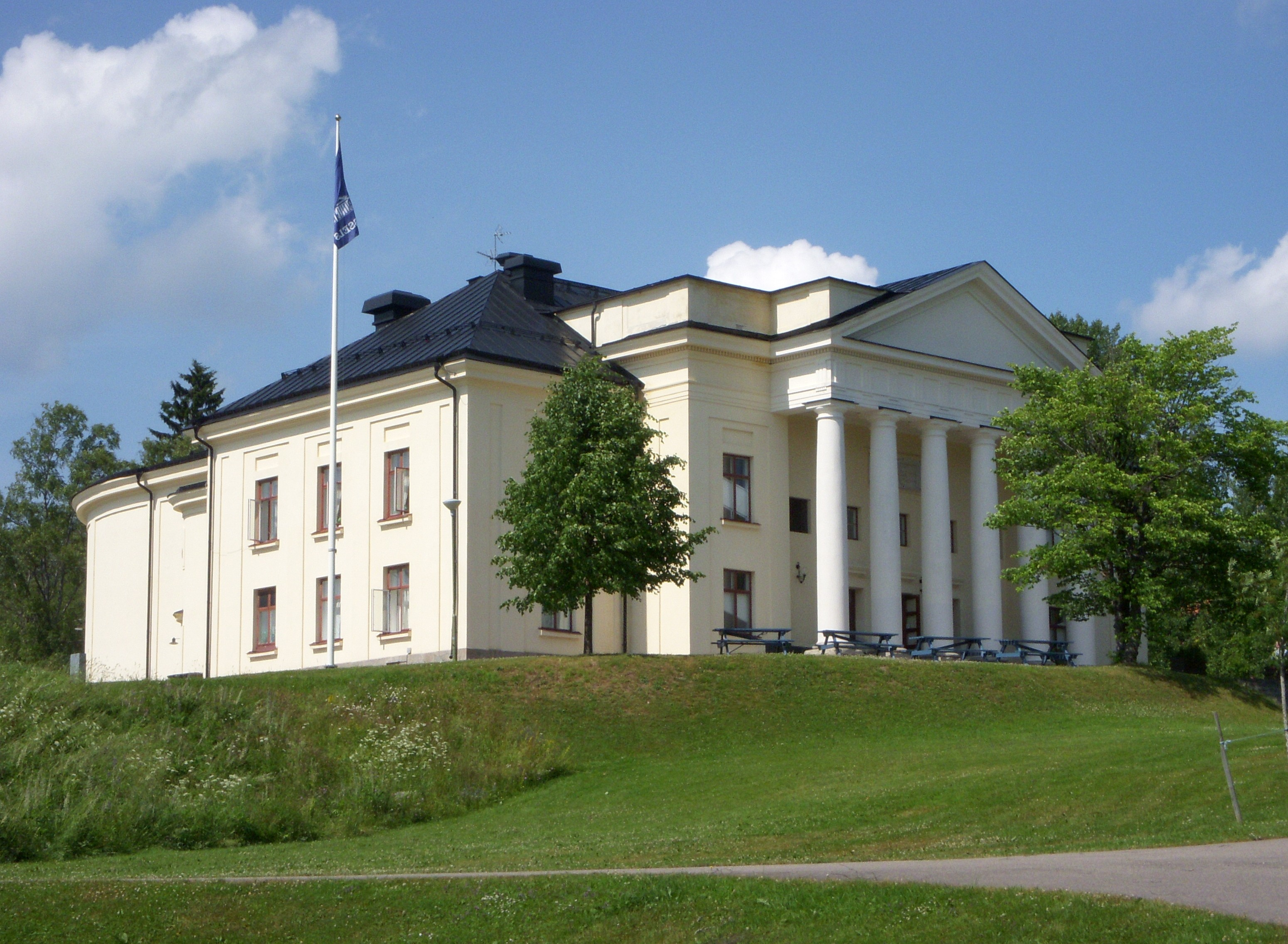
Cassel's Donation Concert House in Grängesberg, Sweden

Cassel retired from business in 1910. His philanthropic benefactions included £500,000 for educational purposes, £225,000 for a hospital for nervous diseases and £50,000 to King Edward's Hospital Fund in memory of his only child. He built and endowed an Anglo-German Institute in 1911 in memory of King Edward VII.

During the First World War Cassel made large financial gifts to the British Red Cross and other war time charitable entities working to ameliorate privation being suffered by British military casualties.

Cassel had a famous art collection and many beautiful houses. He bred racehorses and owned Moulton Paddocks in Newmarket.

== Family ==
Cassel was married at Westminster, in 1878, to Annette Mary Maud Maxwell, the daughter of a Catholic landowner. Their only child, Amalia Mary Maud Cassel (1880–1911), known as "Maud", married Wilfrid Ashley, 1st Baron Mount Temple.

After the early death of his wife Annette in 1881, he and his widowed sister Wilhelmina (known as Bobbie) helped each other bring up his daughter (Maud) and Wilhelmina's son (Felix) and daughter (Anna).

Maud died as a young woman, leaving him two granddaughters (Edwina and Mary) on whom he doted. He was particularly attached to Edwina, who looked after him in his old age. She later married Lord Louis Mountbatten.

Cassel's nephew was the barrister Sir Felix Cassel, who later became Judge Advocate-General to the Forces.

Cassel became a Roman Catholic at the behest of his wife, but many still considered him a Jew. The establishment was surprised to find out that he had converted when he chose to be sworn into the Privy Council with the Douay–Rheims Bible.

== Honours ==
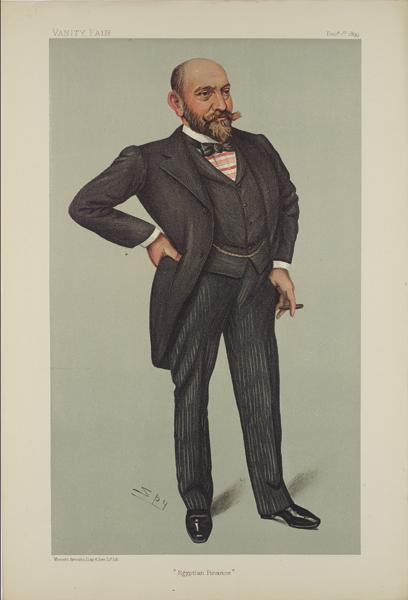
Cassel caricatured by Spy for Vanity Fair, 1899

Cassel's friendship with the King and achievements in international finance earned him many British and foreign honours. Contemporary society gossip suggested that he demanded these as a return for his services. In 1899, he was made a Knight Commander of the Order of St Michael and St George (KCMG). In 1901, he was made a Knight Commander of the Royal Victorian Order (KCVO).

He was sworn a member of the Privy Council on 11 August 1902, following an announcement of the King's intention to make this appointment in the 1902 Coronation Honours list published in June that year. In 1905, he was promoted to Knight Grand Cross of the Order of St Michael and St George (GCMG) and, in 1906, he was promoted to Knight Grand Cross of the Royal Victorian Order (GCVO). In the 1909 Birthday Honours, he was made a Knight Grand Cross of the Order of the Bath (GCB).

Awards received in thanks for services to foreign governments included Commander, first class, of the Royal Order of Vasa in 1900 from Sweden, the Grand Cordon of the Imperial Ottoman Order of Osmanieh in December 1902 while visiting Egypt for the opening of the Assuan dam, Commander of the Légion d'honneur in 1906 from France, the Order of the Crown, first class, in 1908 from Prussia, the Grand Cross of the Order of the Polar Star in 1909 from Sweden, the Order of the Rising Sun, first class, in 1911 from Japan and the Order of the Red Eagle, first class with brilliants in 1913 from Prussia.

== Death ==
Cassel died at Brook House, Park Lane, London. His body was buried in Kensal Green Cemetery.

=== Estate ===
Cassel's estate was valued at his death at £7,333,411 gross and £6,000,000 (equivalent to £254 million today) for probate. A 2001 study of probate records put the value at £7,333,000. Approximately £2,900,000 in death duties were levied on his estate.

His will provided generous annuities to various servants and friends; the bulk of the estate was bequeathed to various relatives, including:

- £10,000 outright, a life annuity of £30,000, and a life-interest in his country estates Moulton Paddocks & Branksome Dene, and a life interest in his London mansion Brook House to his sister Wilhemina Cassell;
- A trust fund containing 15/64th's of his residuary estate, the Six Mile Bottom and Hare Park Estates in Cambridgeshire to his younger granddaughter Ruth Mary Ashley (this income from this trust was £70,000 to £90,000 annually during the 1930s);
- A trust fund containing 25/64th's of his residuary estate, and a reversionary interest in Brook House, the Branksome Dene estate and the Moulton Paddocks estate to his elder granddaughter Edwina Ashley (Edwina's share of the estate was ultimately valued at approximately £1,600,000, and her before-tax income from the trust was reportedly £113,000 annually during the 1930s);
- £10,000 and 25% of his residuary estate to his nephew Sir Felix Cassel, 1st Bt; and,
- £10,000 and 12.5% of his residuary estate to his niece Anna Cassel Jenkins.

Shortly before he died, Sir Ernest formed a private company, Investments Administration Ltd to which he transferred £3,000,000 in shares and investments. The company was eventually wound up in November 1960, with a likely-undervalued £2,250,000 of shares owned or held in trust for various members of his family.

A lump sum valued between £500,000 and £1,000,000 from Cassel's estate later vested into the ownership of his descendants in 1958, following a protracted series of negotiations relating to a fund which his will stipulated should be kept separate and allowed to accrued interest for the first decade following his death.

== Legacy ==
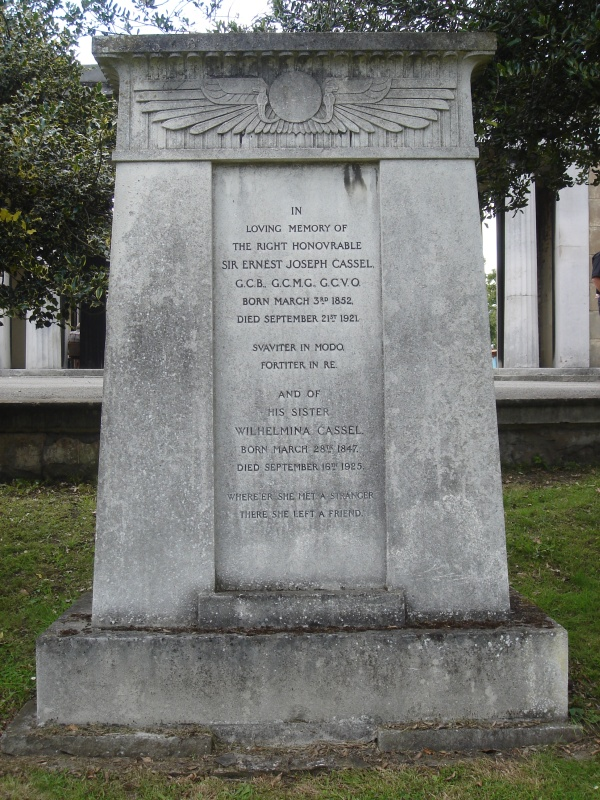
Funerary monument, Kensal Green Cemetery, London

In 1919, Cassel founded and endowed the Cassel Hospital, originally at Swaylands near Penshurst, and now at No. 1 Ham Common, Ham, near Richmond, London. The hospital is a therapeutic community for the mentally ill, providing residential, day and outreach services, part of the NHS.

In 1919 he set up the Sir Ernest Cassel Educational Trust, which remains active as a registered charity under English law.

== See also ==
- National Bank of Egypt
- National Bank of Turkey
