= 21 Upper Brook Street =

Residential building in London

General information
- Type: Residential
- Location: London, England
- Coordinates: 51°30′41″N 0°09′21″W
- Completed: 1737

Listed Building – Grade II
- Official name: 21, UPPER BROOK STREET W1
- Designated: 1 December 1987
- Reference no.: 1357297

21 Upper Brook Street is a Grade II listed terraced townhouse on Upper Brook Street in the Mayfair area of London.

== History and description ==
Upper Brook Street, built up between 1728 and 1759 is characterised for its surviving pre-war houses. No. 21 retains the original 1737 structure although its original brick fronting with stone band-course was stuccoed in 1973.

Alterations to the interior were carried out during the lease of Charles Herbert, likely around 1787, including elements in the style of Henry Holland, much of which survives. The 1871 lease was renewed with the stipulation of the "elevation remaining as it is". Alterations at the rear were carried out between 1889 and 1890 by H. C. Boyes. The front brickwork was coloured shortly after the Second World War and stuccoed in 1973.

Other notable former occupants of the house include politicians William Dowdeswell, Edward Brydges Willyams.

== See also ==
- 20 Upper Brook Street
- 22 Upper Brook Street
