= 54 Mount Street =

House in the City of Westminster, London, England

Coordinates: 51.5094°N 0.1536°W

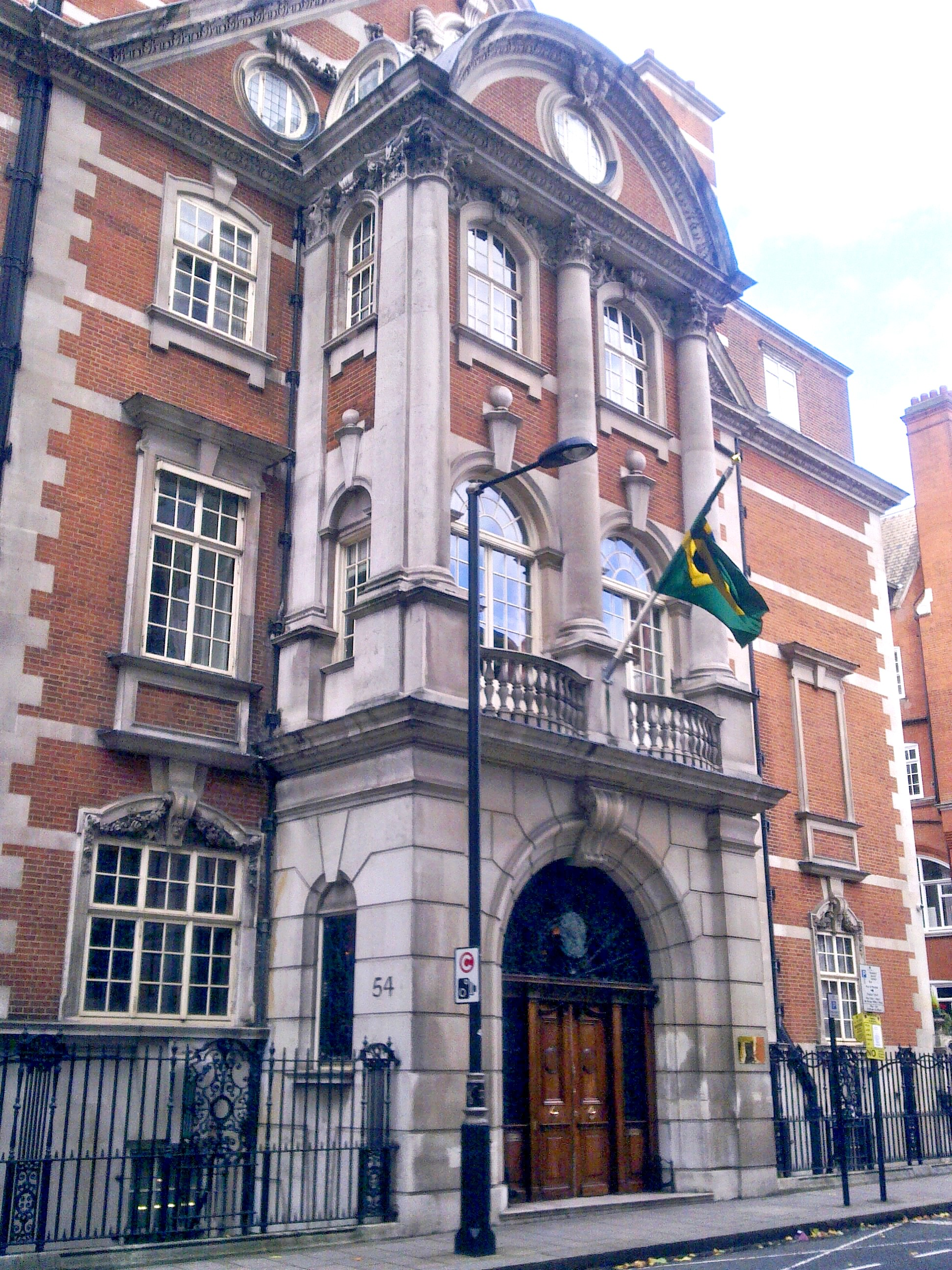
54 Mount Street.

54 Mount Street is a grade II* listed building in Mount Street in the City of Westminster. It is the residence of the Brazilian ambassador in London. The main embassy building is located at Cockspur Street.

It was built in 1896–97 to a design by Fairfax Blomfield Wade-Palmer for Lord Windsor, later the Earl of Plymouth. Historic England describe it as using "Arts and Crafts quality of materials and detailing combined with innovatory Free "renaissance" and hints of Grand Siècle classicism, with sumptuous formal interiors."

== Royal Residence ==
The House became the London Residence of Prince Arthur of Connaught and his wife Princess Alexandra, 2nd Duchess of Fife shortly after their marriage in 1913; Prince Arthur reportedly leased the house from Robert Windsor-Clive, 1st Earl of Plymouth. By September 1916 the couple had relocated their London residence to 17 Hill Street, Mayfair.

== Gallery ==
Images of the interior, c. 1911.

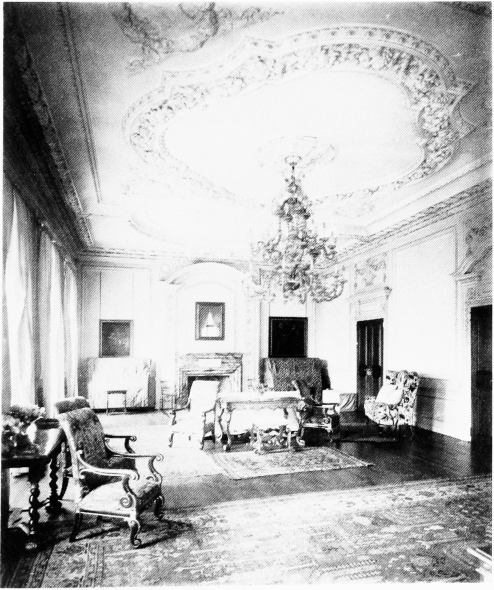
Drawing room

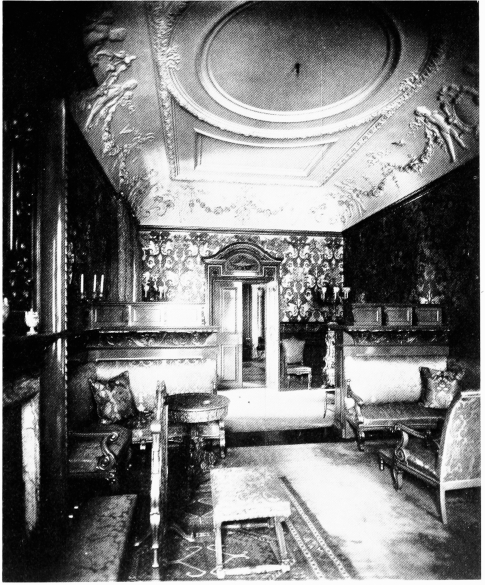
Green room

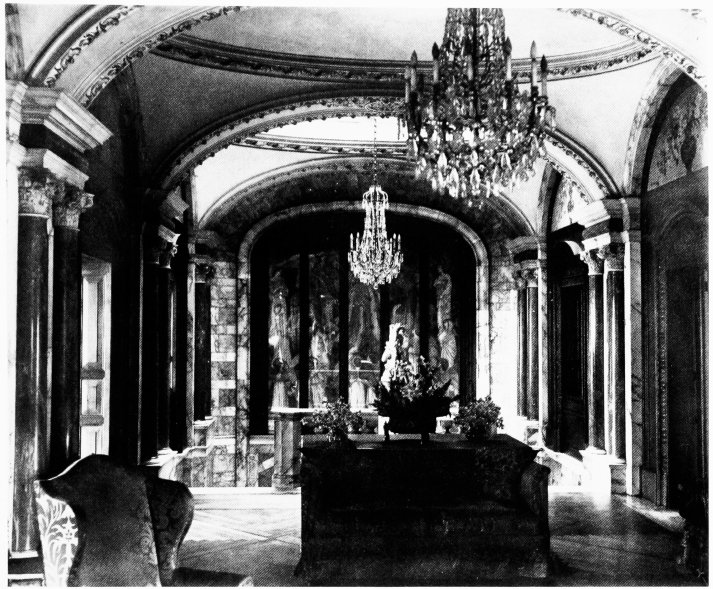
Upper hall
