= 22 Upper Brook Street =

Residential building in London

General information
- Type: Offices, originally residential
- Location: London, England
- Coordinates: 51°30′41″N 0°09′22″W
- Completed: 1742

Listed Building – Grade II
- Official name: Number 22 and Attached Railings
- Designated: 15 February 1991
- Reference no.: 1277906

22 Upper Brook Street is a Grade II listed former townhouse on Upper Brook Street in the Mayfair area of London.

== History and description ==
Upper Brook Street, built up between 1728 and 1759 is characterised for its surviving pre-war houses. No. 22 retains the original 1742 structure although it has been entirely refaced with substantial alterations carried out at various separate times.

Its first occupant was Hugh Hume-Campbell, 3rd Earl of Marchmont who while living in 1744 there received a letter from Lord Bolingbroke to have a pirated version of his pamphlet The Idea of a Patriot King "burned att yr House, to help to dry which is the best use it can be put to".

In 1881, the house was refronted under the new leaseholder Sir William Lionel Darell with a design by R. Fabian Russell, described by Nikolaus Pevsner as in "an undecided style". The new front as stuccoed with an iron balcony and portico. It is possible Darell never had the chance to live in the house dying in 1883. Further works were carried out between 1906 and 1907 by Gerald Horsley for the tenant Leo Bonn. In 1911, Bonn held a meeting for the creation of what would become the Royal National Institute for Deaf People in the house.

Other notable former occupants of the house include Frederick Keppel, Bishop of Exeter, and politicians William Battie Wrightson, Edward Cholmeley Dering.

== See also ==
- 21 Upper Brook Street
- 23 Upper Brook Street
