= 19 Upper Brook Street =

Residential building in London

General information
- Type: Offices, originally residential
- Location: London, England
- Coordinates: 51°30′41″N 0°09′20″W
- Completed: 1737

Listed Building – Grade II
- Official name: Number 19 and Attached Railings
- Designated: 15 February 1991
- Reference no.: 1248458

19 Upper Brook Street is a Grade II listed former townhouse on Upper Brook Street in the Mayfair area of London.

== History and description ==
Upper Brook Street, built up between 1728 and 1759 is characterised for its surviving pre-war houses. No. 19 is of the original 1737 although due to a number of substantial alterations retains little internal fabric of the original.

The most substantial alterations to the exterior were carried out by Thomas Cundy II, who did the same for a number of properties on the street. This included the addition of a portico, a first floor balcony and new stone window dressings. In the 1880s a further storey was added by Arding and Bond.

Substantial interior redecoration was carried out between 1903 and 1904 in a Second Empire style by W. H. Romaine-Walker and Besant and Charles Mellier and Company, with French workmen employed for the task. The portico was also enclosed at this time.

Notable former occupants of the house include Hayes St Leger, 3rd Viscount Doneraile, and politician Edward Rose Tunno. It also at one point housed the Brazilian Embassy.

== See also ==
- 18 Upper Brook Street
- 20 Upper Brook Street
