= 24 Upper Brook Street =

Residential building in London

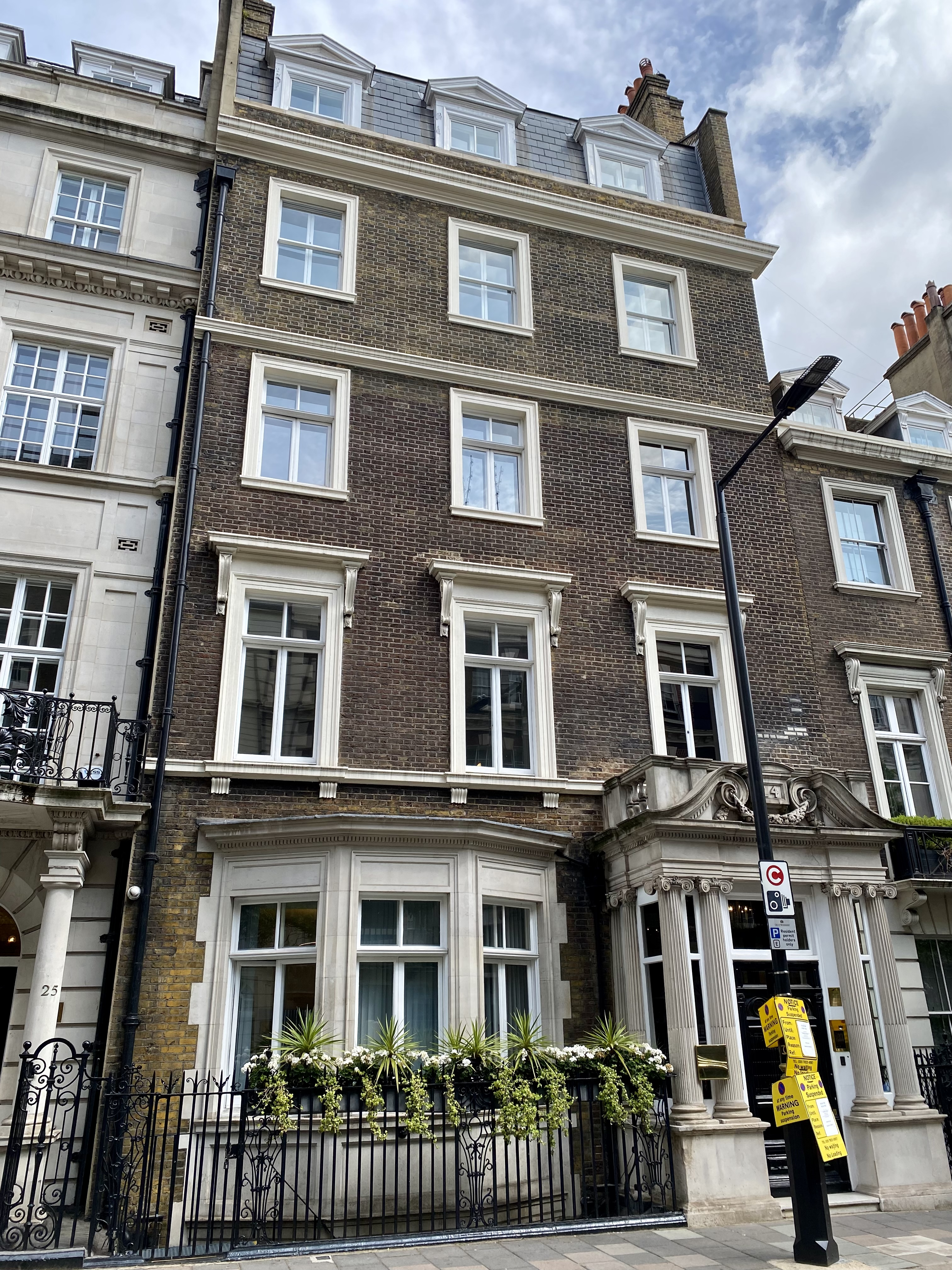

General information
- Type: Offices, originally residential
- Location: London, England
- Coordinates: 51°30′41″N 0°09′23″W
- Completed: 1742

Listed Building – Grade II
- Official name: Number 24 and Attached Railings
- Designated: 15 February 1991
- Reference no.: 1248459

24 Upper Brook Street is a Grade II listed former terraced house on Upper Brook Street in the Mayfair area of London.

== History and description ==
Upper Brook Street, built up between 1728 and 1759 is characterised for its surviving pre-war houses. No. 24 is a survivor of the original Georgian style buildings of the mid-18th century, built in 1742 alongside No. 25 now replaced by an Edwardian Portland stone fronted design.

Notwithstanding, the building has been substantially altered at various times throughout the years. It saw its frontage redecorated by Thomas Cundy II in 1850, then in 1880 an extra storey was added by John Livock and carried out by Charles Aldin and Sons. In 1889 a portico was added by Goldie, Child and Goldie under leaseholder Sydney Ernest Kennedy who also saw the wholesale redecoration of the interior in a Jacobethan style, of which much survives today.

Other notable former occupants of the house include politicians Henry Brydges, 2nd Duke of Chandos, Richard Bull, John Wodehouse and Robert Curzon, as well as civil servant Robert Henry Mead.

== See also ==
- 23 Upper Brook Street
- 25 Upper Brook Street
