= Embassy of Brazil, London =

Embassy of Brazil in London
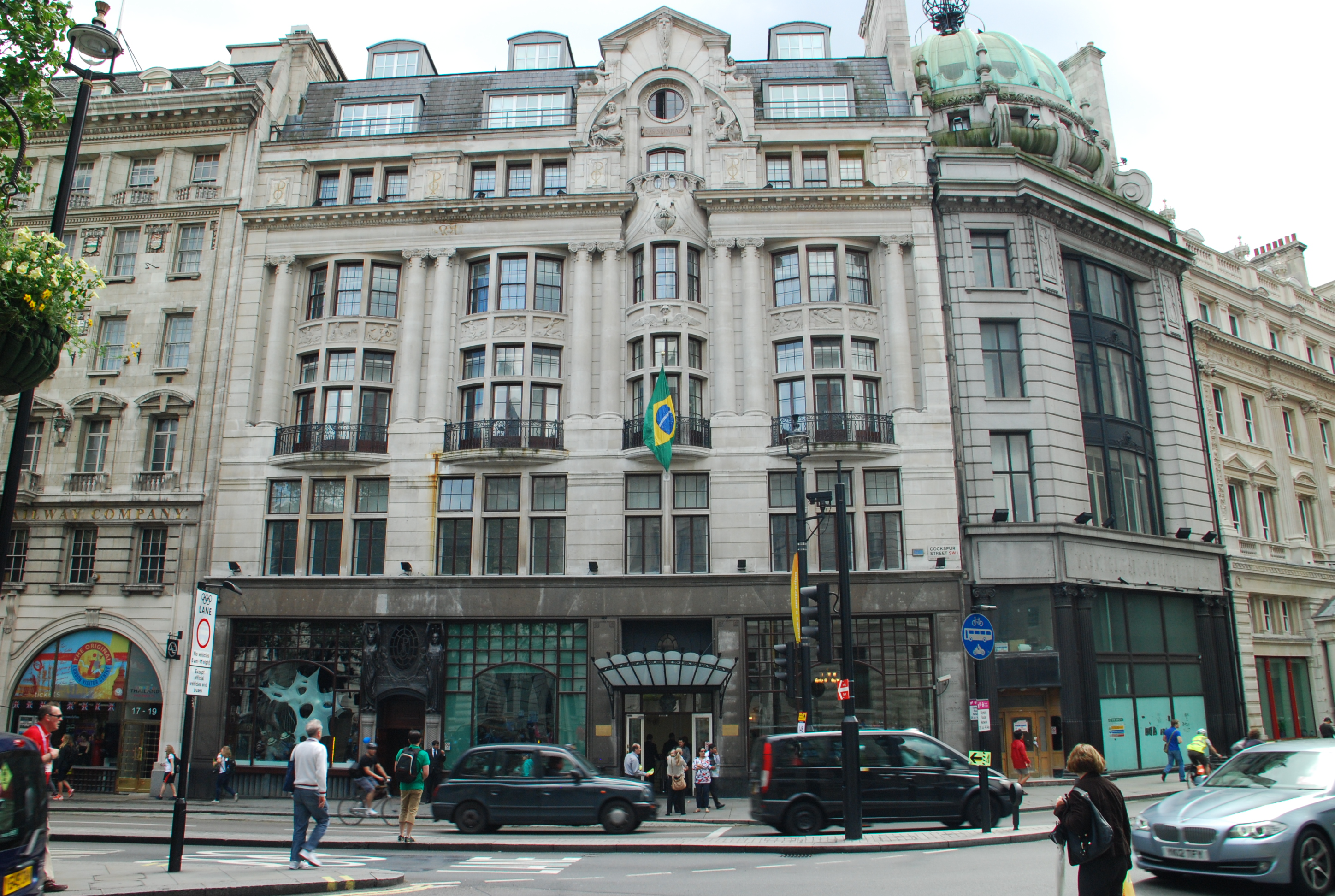
- Location: Westminster, London
- Address: 14/16 Cockspur Street, London, SW1Y 5BL
- Coordinates: 51°30′27″N 0°07′50″W
- Ambassador: Antonio de Aguiar Patriota

The Embassy of Brazil in London is the diplomatic mission of Brazil in the United Kingdom. It is located at 14-16 Cockspur Street, close to Trafalgar Square. The Grade II listed building dates from 1906: it was designed by Arthur Bolton, originally as the headquarters of the Hamburg America Line.

== Ancillary buildings ==
The residence that the Brazilian ambassador occupies is located in a separate building at 54 Mount Street, Mayfair, as is the Consular section which is at 3-4 Vere Street, Marylebone. Brazil also maintain an Office of the Naval Adviser at 170 Upper Richmond Road, Putney and an Office of the Air Adviser/Brazil Aeronautical Commission in Europe at 16 Great James Street, Bloomsbury.

== Previous locations ==
The Embassy moved to its current location in Cockspur Street in 2011, from Green Street, Mayfair. From 1917 to 1920 the Embassy was located at 51 Upper Brook Street, Mayfair, then at 19 Upper Brook Street 1921–40.

== Gallery ==
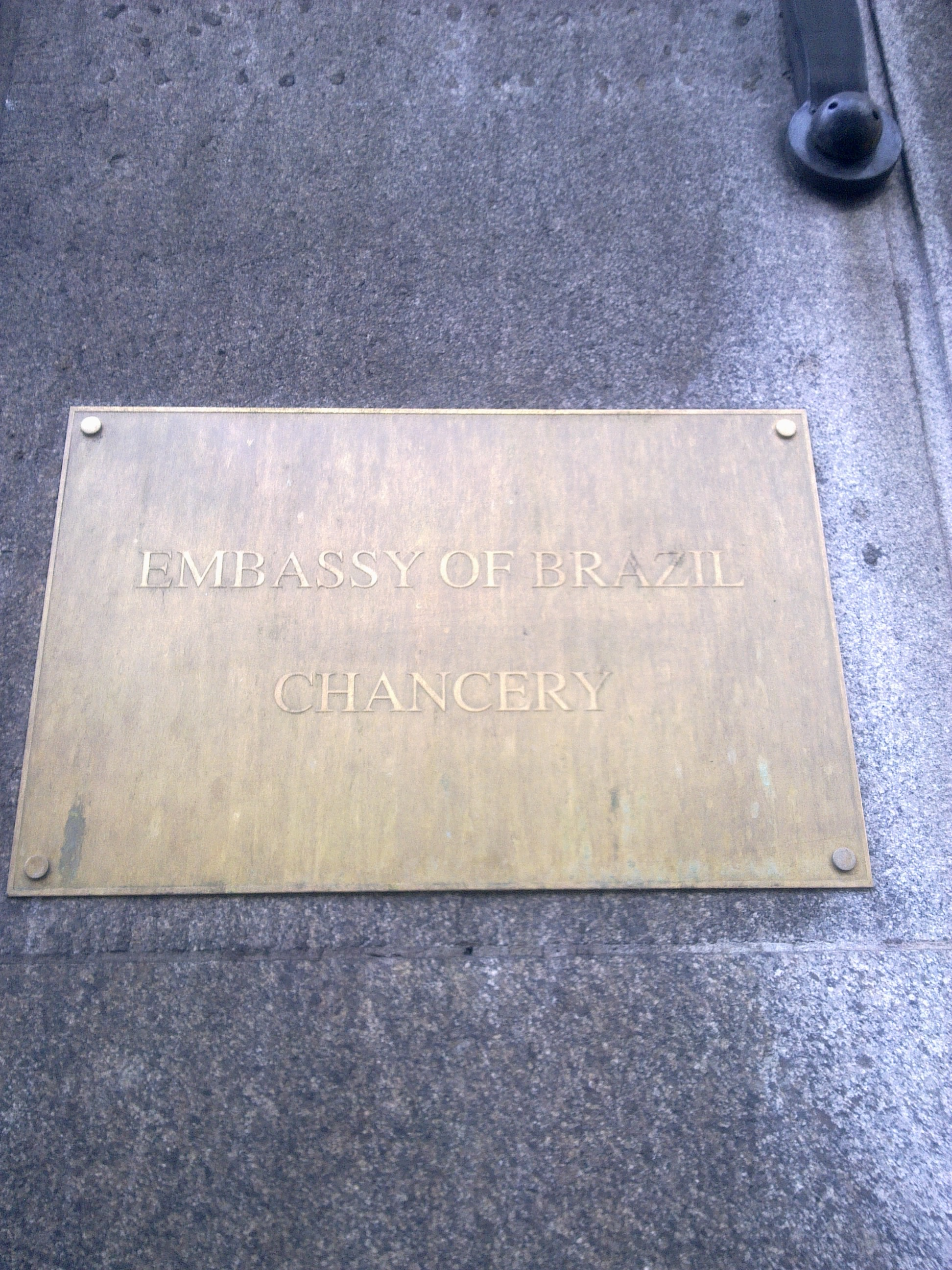
Plaque outside the embassy

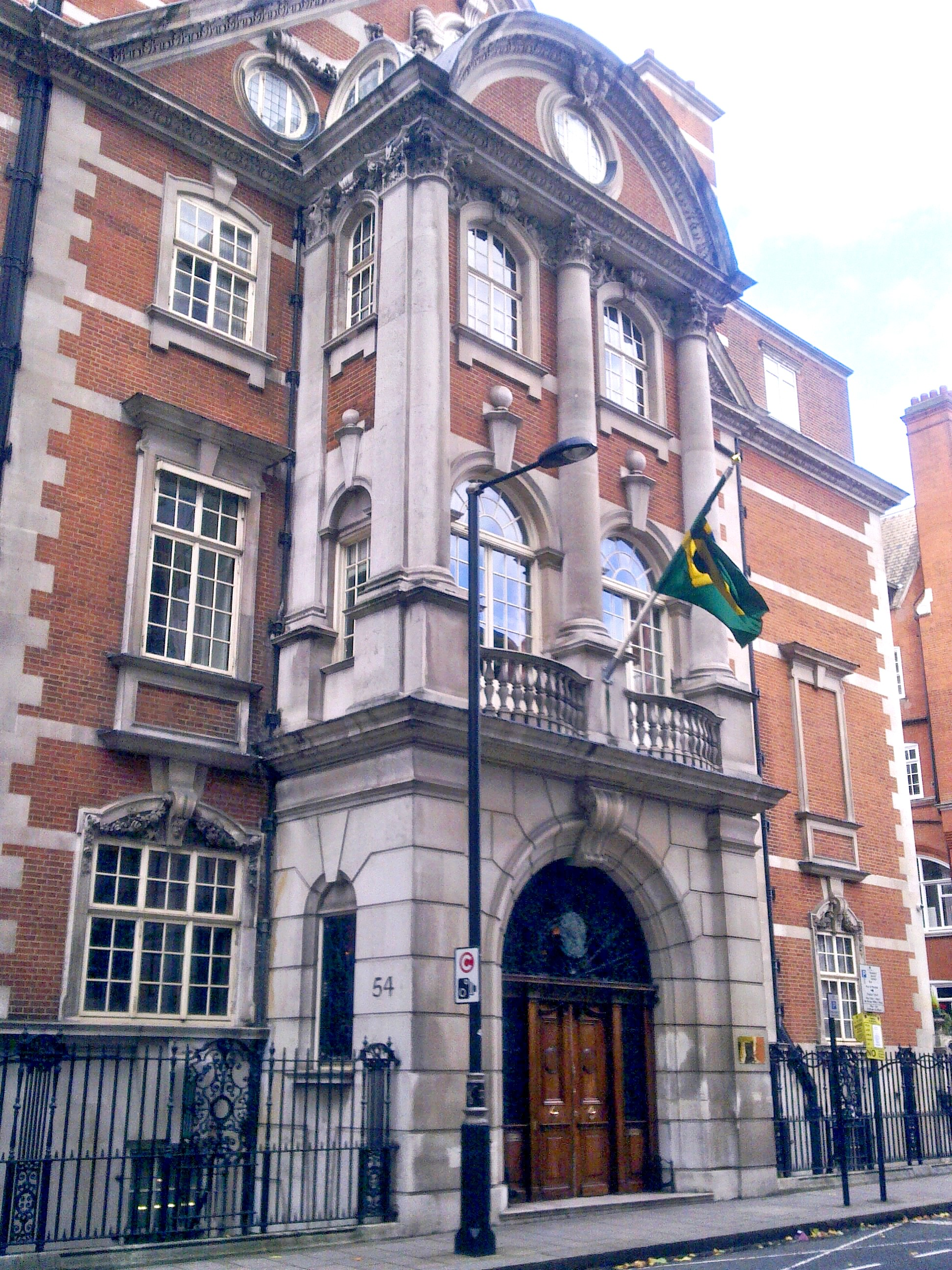
The Ambassador's residence at 54 Mount Street

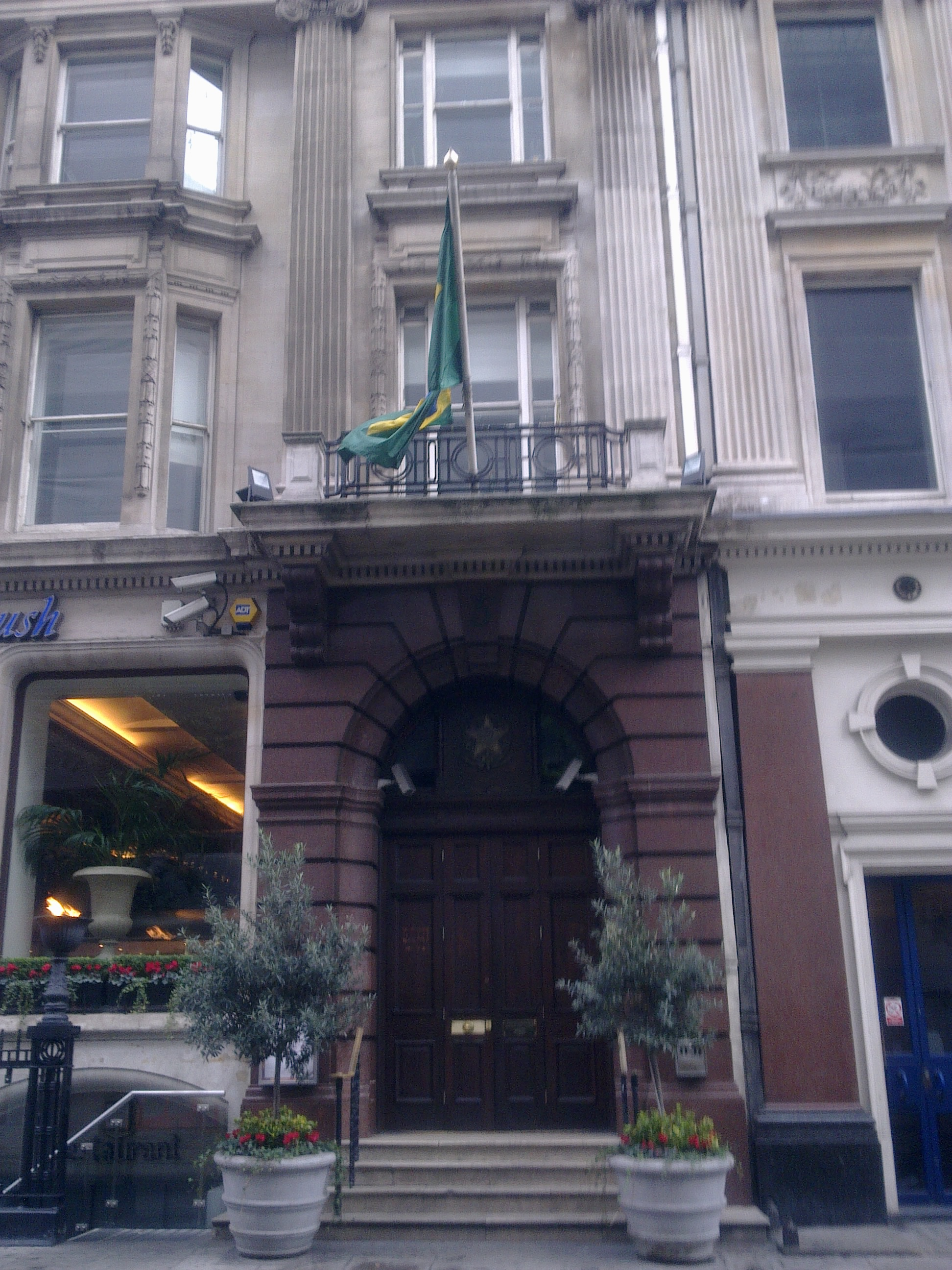
The Consulate on Vere Street

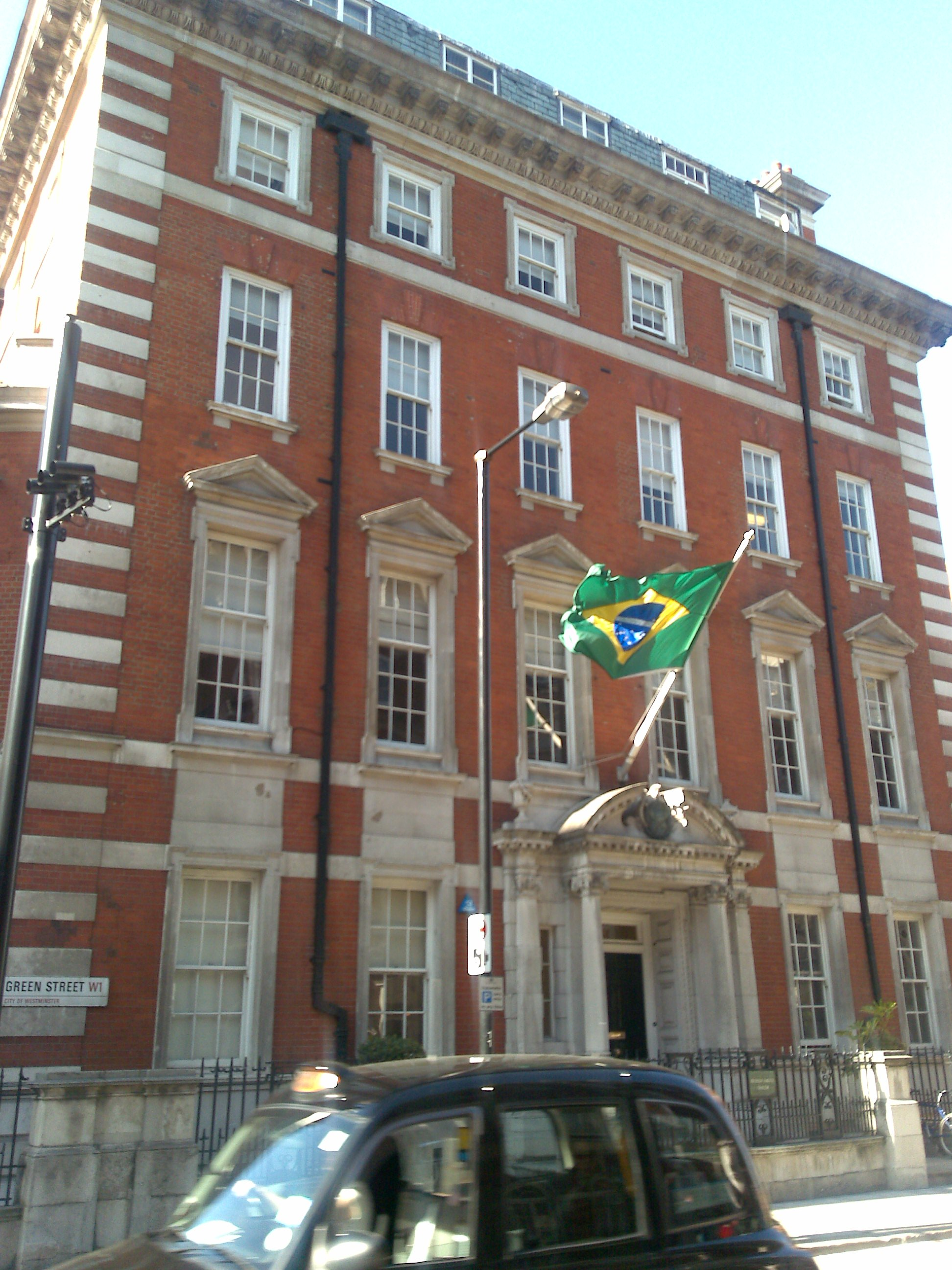
The former embassy in Green Street

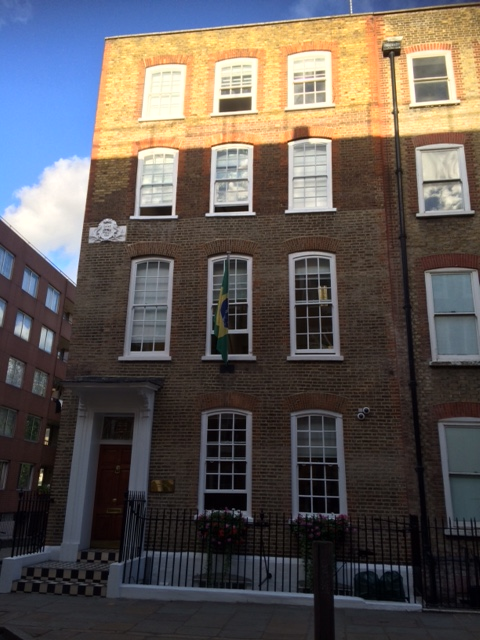
The Brazil Aeronautical Commission in Europe on St James Street

== Bibliography ==
- Stourton, James (2012). Great Houses of London (Hardback). London: Frances Lincoln. ISBN 978-0-7112-3366-9.
