= 20 Upper Brook Street =

Residential building in London

General information
- Type: Residential
- Location: London, England
- Coordinates: 51°30′41″N 0°09′21″W
- Completed: 1737

Listed Building – Grade II
- Official name: 20, UPPER BROOK STREET W1
- Designated: 1 December 1987
- Reference no.: 1221672

20 Upper Brook Street is a Grade II listed terraced townhouse on Upper Brook Street in the Mayfair area of London.

== History and description ==
Upper Brook Street, built up between 1728 and 1759 is characterised for its surviving pre-war houses. No. 20 retains the original 1737 structure as well as interior plan, and some of the interior panelling and plasterwork.

Alterations were carried out several times throughout the house's existence. The fanlight doorcase was likely added in the early 19th-century, along with the front being stuccoed. Alterations were made in 1854 and between 1865 and 1866 a storey was added to the top. Thomas Cundy II, responsible for redecorating a number of the house fronts on the street in the mid-19th century, also added a balcony and porch. Thomas Bellamy also designed new kitchens under the garden for leaseholder John Boileau. Further alterations were carried out in 1875 and in 1887, the latter by A. and E. Braid and J. Sargeant for leaseholder William Fellowes.

Other notable former occupants of the house include British Army Officers Ralph Burton, Napier Christie Burton, and diplomat Samuel Hood, 6th Viscount Hood.

== See also ==
- 19 Upper Brook Street
- 21 Upper Brook Street
