= 23 Upper Brook Street =

Residential building in London

General information
- Type: Residential
- Location: London, England
- Coordinates: 51°30′41″N 0°09′22″W
- Completed: 1742

Listed Building – Grade II
- Official name: 23, UPPER BROOK STREET W1
- Designated: 1 December 1987
- Reference no.: 1221679

23 Upper Brook Street is a Grade II listed terraced townhouse on Upper Brook Street in the Mayfair area of London.

== History and description ==
Upper Brook Street, built up between 1728 and 1759 is characterised for its surviving pre-war houses. No. 23 is a survivor of the original Georgian style buildings of the mid-18th century, built in 1742, it is a storey lower than its neighbours.

Like a number of other surviving properties on the street, it has been substantially altered. An extension was added in 1808, and in 1865 the front was remodelled with the addition of a portico, balconettes, and decorations by Thomas Cundy II who worked on a number of properties on the street in the mid-19th century, including neighbouring No. 24. Leaseholder Christopher Furness contemplated the rebuilding of the house in the early 1900s, as were a lot of other houses on the street, but his successor Claude Hope-Morley, son of Samuel Hope Morley, instead remodelled the house between 1912 and 1913. Interior works were again carried out in 1973 by Rolfe Judd Group Practice.

Other notable former occupants of the house include politicians William Monckton, Edward Blackett, Robert Seymour Conway, and Thomas Fowell Buxton.

== See also ==
- 22 Upper Brook Street
- 24 Upper Brook Street
