= 18 Upper Brook Street =

Residential building in London

General information
- Type: Offices, originally residential
- Location: London, England
- Coordinates: 51°30′41″N 0°09′20″W
- Completed: 1916

Listed Building – Grade II
- Official name: Number 18 and Attached Railings
- Designated: 15 February 1991
- Reference no.: 1277905

18 Upper Brook Street is a Grade II listed former townhouse on Upper Brook Street in the Mayfair area of London.

== History and description ==
Upper Brook Street, built up between 1728 and 1759 is characterised for its surviving pre-war houses. No. 18 is an Edwardian addition, built starting from 1913 alongside its neighbours at No. 17 and No. 16, all designed by Edmund Wimperis, later of Wimperis, Simpson and Guthrie. It replaced a house of 1737, first leased to Thomas Fermor, 1st Earl of Pomfret.

Unlike the other two houses by Wimperis, No. 18 lacks a gable, with a design similar instead to No. 2 of the street. The interior and plan was the work of Ralph Knott and E. Stone Collins. Construction was delayed by the First World War and only completed by 1916. Alterations were carried out as early as 1919.

Other notable former occupants of the house and its predecessor include British Army officer Sir Charles Howard, colonial administrator George Thomas, politicians John Chetwynd Talbot, John Nicholas Fazakerley, William Beckett, sculptor Anne Seymour Damer, Vice-admiral William Augustus Montague and agronomist William James Farrer.

== See also ==
- 19 Upper Brook Street
