= 25 Upper Brook Street =

Residential building in London

General information
- Type: Offices, originally residential
- Location: London, England
- Coordinates: 51°30′41″N 0°09′23″W
- Completed: 1908

Listed Building – Grade II
- Official name: Number 25 and Attached Railings
- Designated: 15 February 1991
- Reference no.: 1248486

25 Upper Brook Street is a Grade II listed former terraced house on Upper Brook Street in the Mayfair area of London.

== History and description ==
Upper Brook Street, built up between 1728 and 1759 is characterised for its surviving pre-war houses. 25 Upper Brook Street is an Edwardian example built between 1907 and 1908 to designs by R. G. Hammond, carried out by builders Prestige and Company and decorated by Lansdell and Company. Its front is of Portland stone with a bay running from ground to third floor, with a slate roof with box dormers.

It replaced a Georgian style house of 1742 built alongside neighbouring 24 Upper Brook Street, the house saw exterior alterations by Thomas Cundy II in 1865, but was demolished under the lease of Lewis McIver due to structural issues.

Alterations to the new house were carried out in 1933, with Lengyon and Morant's Neo-Georgian redecoration of the first floor drawing rooms for leaseholder Mrs Claude Leigh.

Other notable former occupants of the house include politicians Charles Gray Round, Henry Gerard Sturt, and George Richard James Hennessy.

== See also ==
- 24 Upper Brook Street
- 26 Upper Brook Street
