= Norwegian-British Chamber of Commerce =

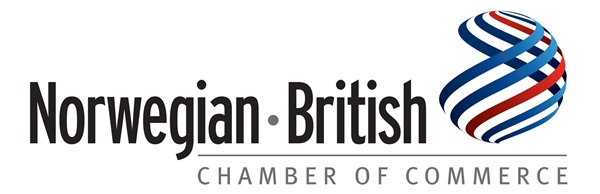
- Founded: London, UK (1906)

The Norwegian-British Chamber of Commerce (NBCC) is a non-profit organisation for the Norwegian-British business community in the UK. It has a membership of more than 100 Norwegian and British companies, as well as a large number of personal members.

The NBCC was founded in 1906 and represents companies and individuals from Norway, the UK and other countries, who wish to be part of the business community. Its mission is to promote trade and investment between Norway and the UK, and to provide a professional and social arena for members and business people. The NBCC works closely with government bodies and other trade organisations, including the Norwegian Embassy, Innovation Norway and other bilateral Chambers of Commerce.

== Foundation ==
After the dissolution of the union between Norway and Sweden in 1905, Norwegians felt a need to unite. Norwegian business people outside the country felt the need to create cooperative organisations which could support them in their work. Two months after Haakon VII ascended the throne of Norway in November 1905, Norwegian businessmen proposed the creation of a Norwegian Chamber of Commerce in London. Johan Jørgensen was the primary advocate and Norway's consul general; Jørgensen and his business partner, William Johnson, were among the few Norwegians engaged in trade in London with most of the rest representing Norwegian shipping interests.

Jørgensen invited fellow Norwegians to form a Chamber of Commerce in January 1906, and the founding meeting was held in London the following April. 21 Norwegians attended, and Thode Fagelund was named the first president of the NBCC.

=== Timeline ===
- 1906: The Norwegian British Chamber of Commerce in London is founded. UK-Norway Trade: Norwegian exports NOK 95 million, Norwegian imports NOK 95 million.
- 1910: Agreement on commercial arbitration between Norway and the UK.
- 1913: The NBCC secures its first office under its own roof in Kingsway.
- 1914-18: First World War. 889 ships and 1156 seafarers from Norway are victims of German submarines and mines.
- 1915: The NBCC begins publishing its monthly Anglo-Norwegian Trade Journal (appears regularly until 1988 apart from a brief period during the Second World War).
- 1920: First sign of interwar economic depressions. Protectionism and recession characterise the period until 1935.
- 1921: Norway House in Cockspur Street off Trafalgar Square is officially opened. The NBCC and other Norwegian institutions in London secure offices in the building. The opening is attended by King Haakon, Crown Prince Olav, Sir Oswyn Murray (British Admiralty) and with Stanley Baldwin making a celebratory speech over lunch.
- 1931: The NBCC celebrate its 25th anniversary in the presence of its Royal Patron, King Haakon VII
- 1939-45: Second World War. The Norwegian king and government transfer to London after the German occupation of April 1940. The NBCC plays an important part in the creation of Nortraship, which operates 1200 merchant ships in 1940-45.
- 1947: Marshall Aid for crisis-hit Europe.
- 1956: NBCC celebrates its 50th anniversary at the Mansion House in presence of Crown Prince Olav.
- 1960: Creation of the European Free Trade Area (Efta). Tariff reductions begin in the free trade area.
- 1963: French president Charles De Gaulle torpe does Norwegian and British membership of the common market.
- 1966: Efta tariff reductions completed.
- 1969: The first commercial oil discovery on the Norwegian continental shelf.
- 1974: Norway and Britain choose different paths when the UK joins the European Community.
- 1981: The NBCC celebrates its 75th anniversary at Fishmongers' Hall in the presence of its Royal Patron, King Olav V. Speakers include Douglas Hurd and Svenn Stray.
- 1990: The organisation changes its name to The Norwegian-British Chamber of Commerce (NBCC).
- 1994: Norway again rejects membership of the European Union.
- 1997: Norway House is sold. The NBCC moves to the Norwegian Trade Centre in Lower Regent Street.
- 2005: UK-Norway trade (in NOK million): Norwegian imports 24 069. Norwegian exports 169,500, with oil and gas accounting for 141,678.
- 2006: The NBCC celebrate its 100th anniversary at The Merchant Taylors’ Hall with the presence of its Royal patron, King Harald V. Guests include the Duke of Gloucester.

== Bibliography ==
- Jerman, Gunnar (2006), A bridge across the North Sea : Norwegian-British Chamber of Commerce 1906-2006, Norwegian-British Chamber of Commerce, OCLC 155668541
- Year book and directory of members, Norwegian-British Chamber of Commerce, 1998, ISSN 1466-3902, OCLC 499062519
