= UCL Ear Institute =

Department of University College London

Coordinates: 51.52929°N 0.11971°W

- Established: 2005
- Director: Prof Jonathan Gale
- Location: London, United Kingdom
- Website: UCL Ear Institute

The UCL Ear Institute is an academic department of the Faculty of Brain Sciences of University College London (UCL) located in Gray's Inn Road in the Bloomsbury district of Central London, England, previously next to the Royal National Throat, Nose and Ear Hospital, the UK's largest ear, nose and throat hospital until it closed in 2019.

Together with the Royal National Throat Nose and Ear Hospital, the institute constitutes the largest centre for audiological research in Europe.

== History ==
In 2000 an £11 million grant from the Wellcome Trust was awarded to UCL to fund the creation of a new Centre for Auditory Research bringing together auditory research scientists and clinicians from across the university. The new centre was linked to the long-standing Institute of Laryngology and Otology (ILO) and its incorporated School of Audiology. In order to provide this cross-faculty, multidisciplinary group with a unifying identity the ILO was disestablished and the UCL Ear Institute created on 1 January 2005. Prof Tony Wright was its first director, followed by Prof David McAlpine from June 2006 and (as interim co-directors) Dr Jennifer Linden and Dr Jonathan Gale from September 2015. In January 2019 Prof Jonathan Gale was appointed as the Director of the Institute.

In December 2006 the results of tests carried out at the institute were published which showed that many children's toys available that Christmas could damage a child's hearing. In February 2007 the Widex Noise Report, a major survey of noise levels in 41 English towns and cities authored by Deepak Prasher of the UCL Ear Institute, was published. In July 2008 the UCL Ear Institute participated in an architectural jelly competition, with the sound of the competing structures being recorded in one of the institute's anechoic chambers.

In March 2010 a team including Professor Martin Birchall, Paolo Macchiarini of the UCL Ear Institute performed the first windpipe transplant using a whole tissue engineered windpipe organ crafted from a patient's own stem cells. In the 5-year follow up study, authors claimed that transplatation was a success and patient had "had a normal social and working life”. In reality, the patient had undergone multiple operation since the transplation, one of which removed the implanted trachea. The fraudulent papers were finally retracted in 2023, after public call for retraction by Karolinska Institutet. Richard Horton, the editor of medical journal The Lancet, in which the papers were published, resisted the retractions for over a decade.

In the same month a team from the institute began a major study to investigate the role of the brain rather than the ear in contributing to hearing difficulties. In August 2010 Aura Satz, the UCL Ear Institute's artist-in-residence, exhibited the results of her work at the institute in 'Location, location, location' at the Jerwood Space gallery in London.

== Education ==
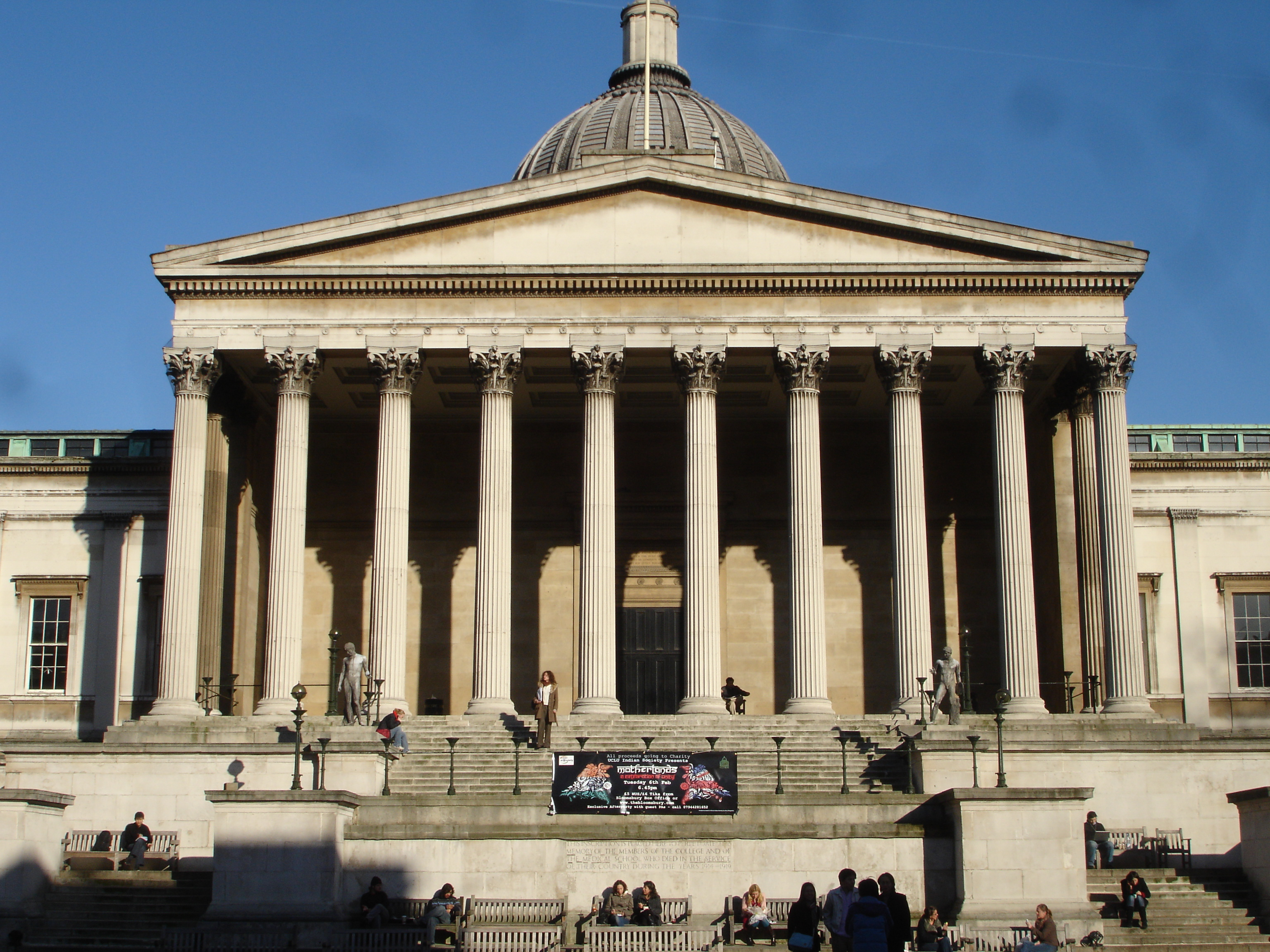
The main portico of University College London

At postgraduate level the institute currently offers the following courses:

- Advanced Audiology (MSc, PGDip, PGCert)
- Audiological Science (MSc, PGDip)
- Audiological Science with Clinical Practice (MSc, PGDip)
- Otology and Audiology (MSc, PGDip, PGCert)
- Sensory Systems, Technologies & Therapies (MRes)

Three- and four-year PhD programmes are available in a wide range of basic and clinical disciplines, including genetics, cell and molecular biology, auditory neuroscience and human auditory function.

== Library ==
The UCL Ear Institute and Action on Hearing Loss Libraries are a collaborative venture between UCL, Action on Hearing Loss (RNID) and the NHS. The libraries are based at the Royal National Throat Nose & Ear Hospital and together constitute the largest specialist collection for audiology, Deaf studies, and otorhinolaryngologic medicine in Europe. As well as providing services to staff and students at UCL, and the University College London Hospitals NHS Foundation Trust, the libraries are open to the public and provide reference and enquiry services to anyone conducting relevant research.

== See also ==
- UCL Neuroscience
- UCL Partners
