= Vere Street, Marylebone =

Street in the City of Westminster, London

Coordinates: 51°30′54″N 0°8′50″W

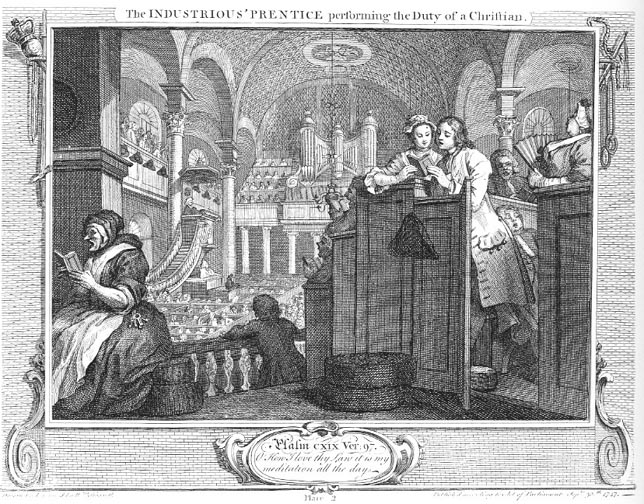
The interior of Marybone Chapel on Vere Street, by William Hogarth.

Vere Street is a street off Oxford Street, in central London. It is a continuation of Welbeck Street, and part of the B406. It is named after a family name of the area's owners at the time of its construction, the Earls of Oxford. It is best known for the Marybone Chapel, also known as the Marylebone Chapel or Oxford Chapel, now St Peter's Vere Street. The sculptor John Michael Rysbrack lived and died here in 1770.

The Marshall & Snelgrove department score was located on the corner of Vere Street and Oxford Street from 1851. It was rebuilt in the 1870s to designs by Horace Jones and his colleague Octavius Hansard, occupying most of the block of buildings between Vere Street and Marylebone Lane. The Oxford Street store was demolished and rebuilt between 1969–71 and continued to trade as Marshall & Snelgrove until 1972. The store was then renamed Debenhams, becoming the group's flagship store.

The Consular Section of the Embassy of Brazil is located at nos. 3–4.

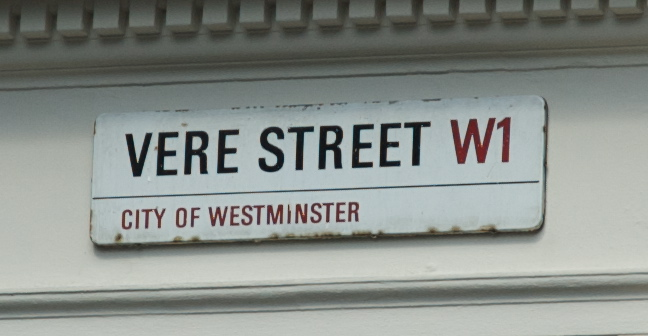

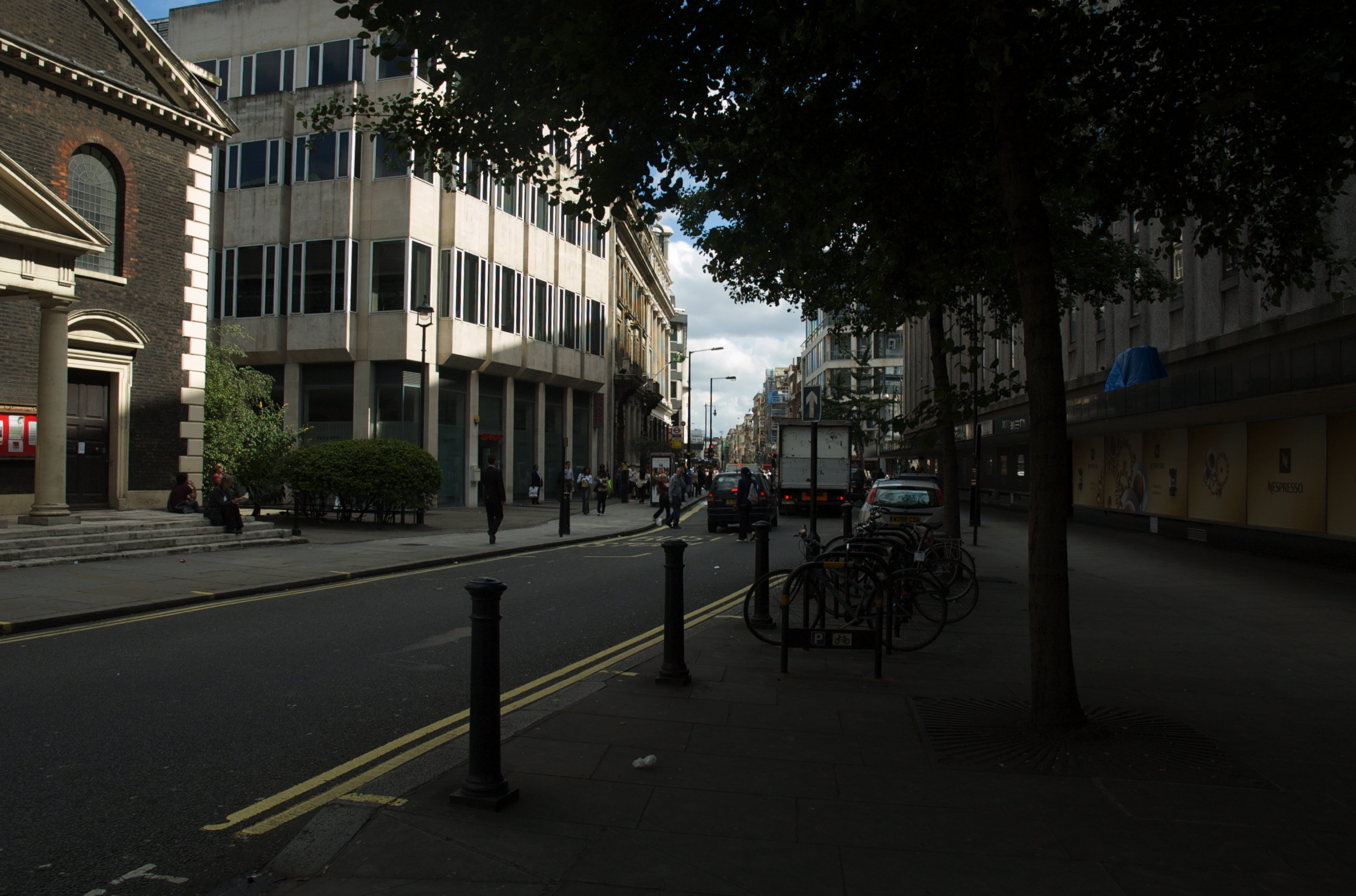
Vere Street from the junction with Henrietta Place, towards Oxford Street

The nearest underground station is Bond Street to the south-west.

== See also ==
- List of eponymous roads in London
