= Mary Hare School =

Mary Hare School For The Deaf
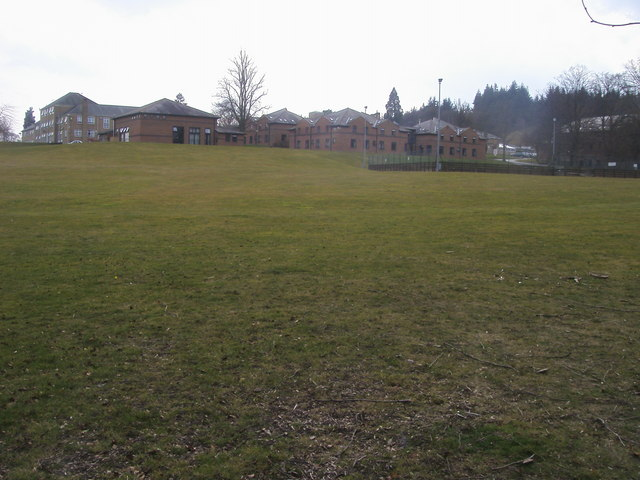

Location
- Arlington Manor; Snelsmore Common; Newbury, Berkshire, RG14 3BQ; England
- Coordinates: 51.4376°N 1.3290°W

Information
- Type: Non-Maintained special school
- Established: 1916
- Founder: Mary Adelaide Hare (3/11/1865 - 5/11/1945)
- Local authority: West Berkshire
- Specialist: Sensory and physical (SEN)
- Department for Education URN: 110180 Tables
- Ofsted: Reports
- Chair of Governors: Tim Polack
- Principal: Robin Askew
- Gender: Co-educational
- Age: 4 to 19
- Enrolment: 237
- Website: https://www.maryhare.org.uk/

Mary Hare School is a residential co-educational Non-Maintained special school for deaf pupils in Newbury, Berkshire, England. It consists of around 230 pupils from Reception (age 4) to Year 13 (age 19).

== History ==
It was established by Mary Adelaide Hare in 1916 as Dene Hollow School for the Deaf in Burgess Hill, West Sussex. After Mary Hare's death on 5 November 1945, it was redesignated as Mary Hare Grammar School for the Deaf on 1 January 1946. Mary Hare School is no longer a Grammar School.

The school bought Arlington Manor and surrounding estates in 1947, and moved from its old site in Burgess Hill to the refurbished premises in 1949. Several building projects have since followed, expanding the school to its current size, including a classroom block, school hall, boarding house for boys, staff flats (now boarding house for year seven pupils), new updated swimming pool, science block, sixth form campus, arts and design centre, Arlington Arts Centre which includes a theatre seating 250, music therapy centre, and recording studio. A boarding house for year 11 pupils, called Murray House, was completed in 2012.

The swimming pool appeal was started in 2014 with completed renovation in eight months of the swimming pool in March 2017, with the replacement of the old rusted away roof.

The school teaches a variety of subjects at GCSE and A level. Many students go onto university and other further education.

The communication policy is oral, which means that students are immersed in English language and therefore sign language is not used in the classroom. Some students may use sign language outside of class. (The "speech competition", a compulsory contest within the school to encourage speech and discourage signing, was abolished in the 1980s).

The school itself is now a small part of a company by the name of Mary Hare Limited, consisting of Mary Hare Secondary and Mary Hare Sixth Form. Other divisions are Mary Hare Primary (formerly Mill Hall School, Cuckfield, West Sussex), Arlington Labs (earmould manufacturers), Mary Hare Training Services (post graduate courses in deaf education, audiology, and hearing aid dispensing), Mary Hare Foundation (fund raising), Arlington Arts Centre (theatre, music, conferences), and Mary Hare Hearing Centres (hearing aid shops). The current school principal is Robin Askew.

In 2017 a fundraising appeal was launched to build a new Primary School at the Arlington Manor school site. The Mary Hare Foundation raised £4 million towards the project, and in 2021 they had the groundbreaking event and building commenced. The building project was completed in August 2022 when the keys were officially handed from the contractors to Mary Hare, and in September 2022 the new Primary School opened for the first time. The whole school (Primary, Secondary and Sixth Form) is now situated all on one site.
