= Leo Bonn =

German-born British banker and philanthropist

Leopold Bernhard Bonn (3 August 1850 – 28 November 1929) was a German-born British banker and philanthropist, best known for founding what would become the Royal National Institute for Deaf People.

== Biography ==
Bonn was born on 3 August 1850 to Jewish banker Baruch Bonn in Frankfurt am Main. In 1866, following Prussia's annexation of Frankfurt, he moved to Paris, and in 1870 following the outbreak of the Franco-Prussian War moved to London. He found work as a manager for the German Bank in 1871 and by 1877 joined Speyer Brothers. He later worked as a director of the London and Liverpool Bank of Commerce and Union of London and Smith's Bank before founding his own Bonn Bank in 1895 with his nephew Max Bonn, which was after the First World War absorbed by Herbert Wagg & Co.

In 1880 Bonn married Ida Amalie Eltzbacher with whom he had one son and two daughters. In later life he grew deaf and made contact with Mary Adelaide Hare who introduced him to Arthur John Story, headmaster of Mount Blind and Deaf School in Stoke-on-Trent who had promoted the establishment of a national organisation for the deaf by combining the numerous regional and local societies and institutions. Bonn agreed to provide funding for the first two years and in 1911 held a meeting at his home in 22 Upper Brook Street where he was elected chairman and president. Deeply involved in the early running of the National Bureau for Promoting the General Welfare of the Deaf, he held the position of chairman until 1915. In 1924, it became the National Institute for the Deaf, with Bonn agreeing to transfer his endowment to the new organisation.

Bonn lived from 1911 onwards at Newbold Revel in Warwickshire and died there on 28 November 1929. He was buried at Monks Kirby parish church.
