= Mary Adelaide Hare =

English teacher of the Deaf and suffragist

- Born: 3 November 1865
- Died: 5 November 1945 (aged 80)
- Known for: Teacher of Deaf children, suffragist, founder of Mary Hare School.

Mary Adelaide Hare (3 November 1865 – 5 November 1945) was a teacher of Deaf children and a suffragist who founded the Mary Hare School.

== Early life ==
Mary Adelaide Hare was born on 3 November 1865 in Kentish Town, London, the sixth of eleven children of Adelaide, (née Rogers) and Thomas Hare, an engineering draughtsman.

== Teaching career ==
Mary Hare trained at the Ealing Training College for Teachers of the Deaf, and taught there as a teacher-trainee. She later became a full-time teacher there, and remained an examiner there after her departure.

In January 1885, Hare opened her own school for Deaf pupils within a private girls’ school run by three of her sisters in Upper Norwood. She took in a handful of students, some of them boarders, including one child from a poor family whom she taught for free. The school moved premises to Brighton in 1894, eventually settling at Burgess Hill, in 1916, where it was known as the Dene Hollow School for the Deaf. The school focused on the 'oral method,' teaching Deaf children to speak as well as sign, and attracted pupils from great distances away.

== Suffragist ==
While in Brighton, Mary Hare chaired meetings of the Women's Social and Political Union and hosted WSPU events in her house. By 1913, she had become the secretary of the Brighton branch of the Women's Freedom League. She spoiled her 1911 census record as part of a WFL protest.

== Later positions and death ==
During World War I she held a leadership role in the Brighton branch of the Women's Police Volunteers. She was the first woman to serve on the Burgess Hill Urban District Council (1919–1938) and the first woman chair of the National College of Teachers of the Deaf (1928).

She died at her home in Dene Hollow on 5 November 1945. In 1946 the school was redesignated the Mary Hare Grammar School for the Deaf.

== Commemoration ==
A blue plaque was erected in her memory in 2024 at St Michael's Place, Brighton, where she taught for six years at the end of the nineteenth century.
