= Royal National Institute for Deaf People =

UK charitable organization

- Established: 1911
- Type: NGO
- Legal status: Charity
- Headquarters: Peterborough, Cambridgeshire, England
- Region served: United Kingdom
- Chief Executive: Harriet Oppenheimer
- Website: rnid.org.uk

The Royal National Institute for Deaf People (RNID), known as Action on Hearing Loss from 2011 to 2020, is a charitable organisation working on behalf of the UK's 12 million people who are deaf, have hearing loss, or tinnitus.

== History ==
The Royal National Institute for Deaf People was founded as the National Bureau for Promoting the General Welfare of the Deaf in 1911 by Leo Bonn (Leo Bernard William Bonn) a deaf merchant banker, and philanthropist, in the ballroom of his home, at Bonn House, 22 Upper Brook Street, Mayfair, on 9 June 1911. The house is marked by a memorial plaque unveiled by Prince Philip, Duke of Edinburgh, Patron to the RNID, on 9 June 1998.

The Bureau was reorganised as the National Institute for the Deaf in 1924. Alongside its role in influencing public policy in favour of people who are deaf or have hearing loss in the UK, it also developed a role as a provider of care to people who are deaf have hearing loss with additional needs during the late 1920s and early 1930s.

During the 1940s, with the introduction of the National Health Service to the UK, it successfully campaigned for the provision of free hearing aids through the new welfare state system. The 1950s and 1960s saw its increasing influence marked by Royal recognition: in 1958, Prince Philip became the Patron of the institute; and in 1961 Elizabeth II approved the addition of the "Royal" prefix, creating the Royal National Institute for the Deaf (RNID).

The Institute expanded into medical and technological research during the 1960s and 1970s, being a key player in the development of NHS provided behind-the-ear hearing aids. During the 1980s it developed the Telephone Exchange for the Deaf, a pioneering relay service allowing telephone users and deaf "textphone" users to communicate with each other using a third-party operator to relay voice and text communication. This became the service known as Typetalk in 1991, funded by BT but operated on their behalf by RNID until 7 December 2009 when RNID stepped down from the service. It is now solely owned, run and managed by BT alone. In March 2009 the name of the Typetalk service was changed to Text Relay.

In 1992 the Institute changed its name to the Royal National Institute for Deaf People but kept the initials RNID.

June 2011 saw celebrations of 100 years of RNID and a new trading name, "Action on Hearing Loss", which was chosen to describe the breadth of help and support that RNID provided for people with all types of hearing loss – from people who were profoundly deaf, to people who were losing their hearing. While trading under the new name, it kept its legal name, Royal National Institute for Deaf People.

RNID announced in 2020 that it was selling its 23 care homes and its supported living, community and domiciliary care services which it had been providing since 1929.

Its 2017/2018 annual accounts showed the charity had an income of £40.1m but spent £42.7m. This was the fifth time in six years that the charity's expenditure had exceeded its income. RNID's auditor PricewaterhouseCoopers said that "material uncertainty" over fundraising income and other conditions cast doubt on the charity's ability to "continue as a going concern".

A financial recovery plan was delivered in the 2019/20 financial year. As a result, RNID's auditors expressed no further concerns about the charity's going concern status in the accounts signed in November 2019. Like many charities, the COVID-19 pandemic resulted in new financial pressures for RNID. As a result of the financial recovery plan and "ongoing prudent financial management", RNID said it is confident in its ongoing financial sustainability.

In 2020, partly as a response to the COVID-19 pandemic and research which led to a new strategy and brand purpose, the charity rebranded and reverted to the RNID name, stating a new purpose: "Together, we will make life fully inclusive for deaf people and those with hearing loss or tinnitus."

The charity's care and support services in England and Wales were acquired by Achieve Together, a provider of specialist support for people with learning disabilities, autism and associated complex needs in 2021.

The charity partnered with Sela and Newcastle United to create a jersey which would transform stadium noise into real-time touch sensations. Sela co-created a "haptic" jersey with the charity for deaf supporters to wear and donated its front-of-shirt sponsorship to the charity for a match against Tottenham Hotspur on 13 April 2024 as part of the charity's "Unsilence the Crowd" campaign.

=== Collections ===
The RNID's collections were part of the Ear Institute Library prior to its closure in 2020. Today, the archive and rare books library is held in University College London's Special Collections.

== Activities ==
RNID activities centre around four key areas:

- Inclusion
- Health
- Employment
- Research

and include:

- campaigning and lobbying to change laws and government policies
- working to improve audiology services
- social and bio-medical research
- providing information and raising awareness of deafness, hearing loss and tinnitus
- drop-in community services where teams can share information about deafness, hearing loss and tinnitus as well as help people maintain their hearing aids
- e-learning and resources for businesses and organisations

== Present operations ==
RNID lobbies and works with the UK government on modernisation of the UK's audiology services. RNID funds research into hearing loss and tinnitus.. The charity also provides in-person information and support at RNID Near You drop-in sessions, which run in towns and cities right across the UK.

=== Hearing check ===
RNID has developed an free online hearing check, which can identify potential hearing problems. The three-minute check assesses a person's ability to hear someone speaking when there is background noise.

=== Celebrity ambassadors ===
The charity's celebrity ambassadors include Samantha Baines and Tasha Ghouri. Scarlette Douglas is a former ambassador.

== Previous operations ==
RNID lobbied the NHS to provide free hearing aids and batteries UK-wide.

In 2000, following a campaign with the National Deaf Children’s Society, all new born babies are offered hearing screening by the NHS.

Research RNID funded links a type of gene, called a microRNA, to hearing loss for the first time, in 2004. This work opens up a new field of research into hearing loss.
