= Cockspur Street =

Short street in the City of Westminster, London

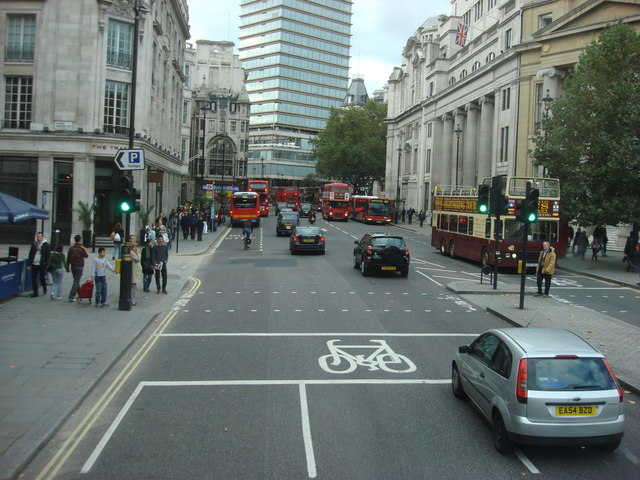
- The whole road viewed from Charles I roundabout since 1675 forming Charing Cross. At the end are the Brazilian Embassy across the junction with the Pall Mall New Zealand House. Canada House engulfing Oceanic House lines the right, north side of the street

- Location within City of Westminster
- Part of: A4
- Maintained by: Transport for London
- Length: 140 m (460 ft)
- Location: London, United Kingdom
- Nearest tube station: Charing Cross
- Coordinates: 51°30′27″N 0°07′45″W

Other
- Known for: Embassy of Brazil, London; Canada House

Cockspur Street is a short street in the City of Westminster, London, SW1 within which a very short part of Trafalgar Square links Charing Cross to Pall Mall/Pall Mall East at the point where that road changes name, opposite the traffic exit from Haymarket. It and all the streets mentioned are part of the A4. It has existed since at least the 16th century along a similar line.

== History ==
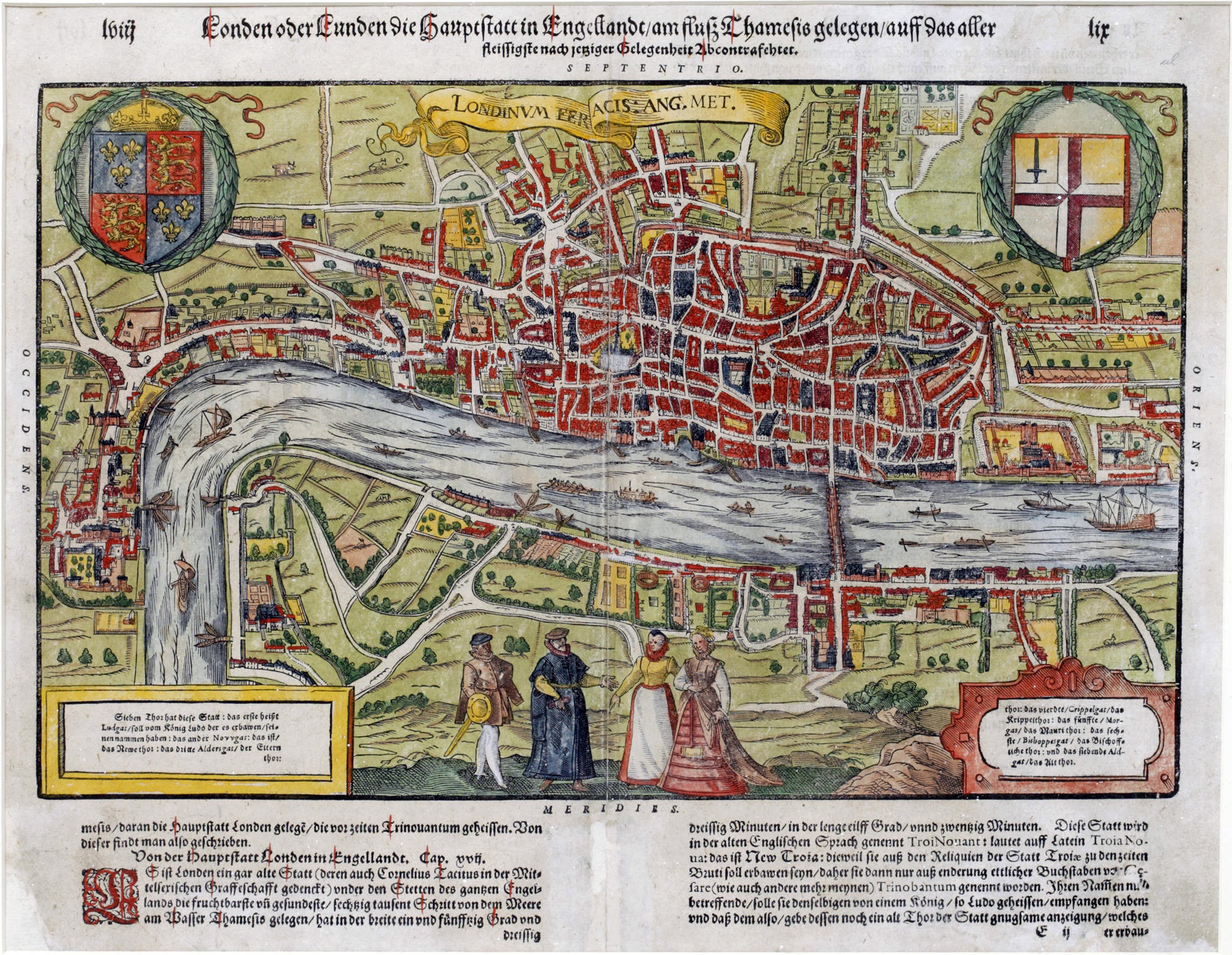
Click to view all.
Map of 1598 shows the short, broad road leading west (Occidens) then north from a traffic island tall memorial. This spike was the local (Queen) Eleanor cross known as Charing Cross marked today by the Charles I equestrian statue roundabout as the memorial has been moved to the apron of the nearby "Charing Cross" terminus station. The road soon forks into three and is shown much broader for decorative purposes. As today it was Cockspur Street.

A map of 1572 shows the street in existence.

In 1746, John Roque's detailed map of London and ten miles around shows Cockspur Street and two very narrow passages connecting, which were later variously abolished and widened.

After Regent Street was built heading north, Pall Mall was extended directly east. This enabled the present one-way flow around the triangle facing the north side of Cockspur Street. All the small-plot properties between Cockspur Street and the newly formed Pall Mall East were pulled down, leaving a triangular site which was taken by the College of Physicians and the Union Club.

=== Properties ===
Number 1, Oceanic House, was originally the London office of the Oceanic Steam Navigation Company trading as the White Star Line, which operated famous liners including the RMS Titanic. "Oceanic House" is inscribed twice on the building and it forms part of Canada House. It was also the Pall Mall Restaurant at one point.

Undivided from this are numbers 2–4, the Serious Fraud Office. Numbers 2–4 were the Canadian Military Headquarters from 1939 to 1947.

Numbers 6 to 13 are no longer used, having made way for new wider street layouts. 14-16 was the Hamburg-Amerika House, London office of the Hamburg America Line. It was put up for sale in 1917 under the Trading with the Enemy Act 1914.

== In news and literature ==
On 29 June 2007, a car containing explosives was found on the street. It was removed and further investigated. The celebrated 'Irish Giant' Charles Byrne, who was reputedly just over 7 feet 7 inches tall (2.31m), died in 1783 at the age of 22 at his lodgings in Cockspur Street. Byrne's skeleton is preserved in the Hunterian Museum of the Royal College of Surgeons in England.

== Gallery ==
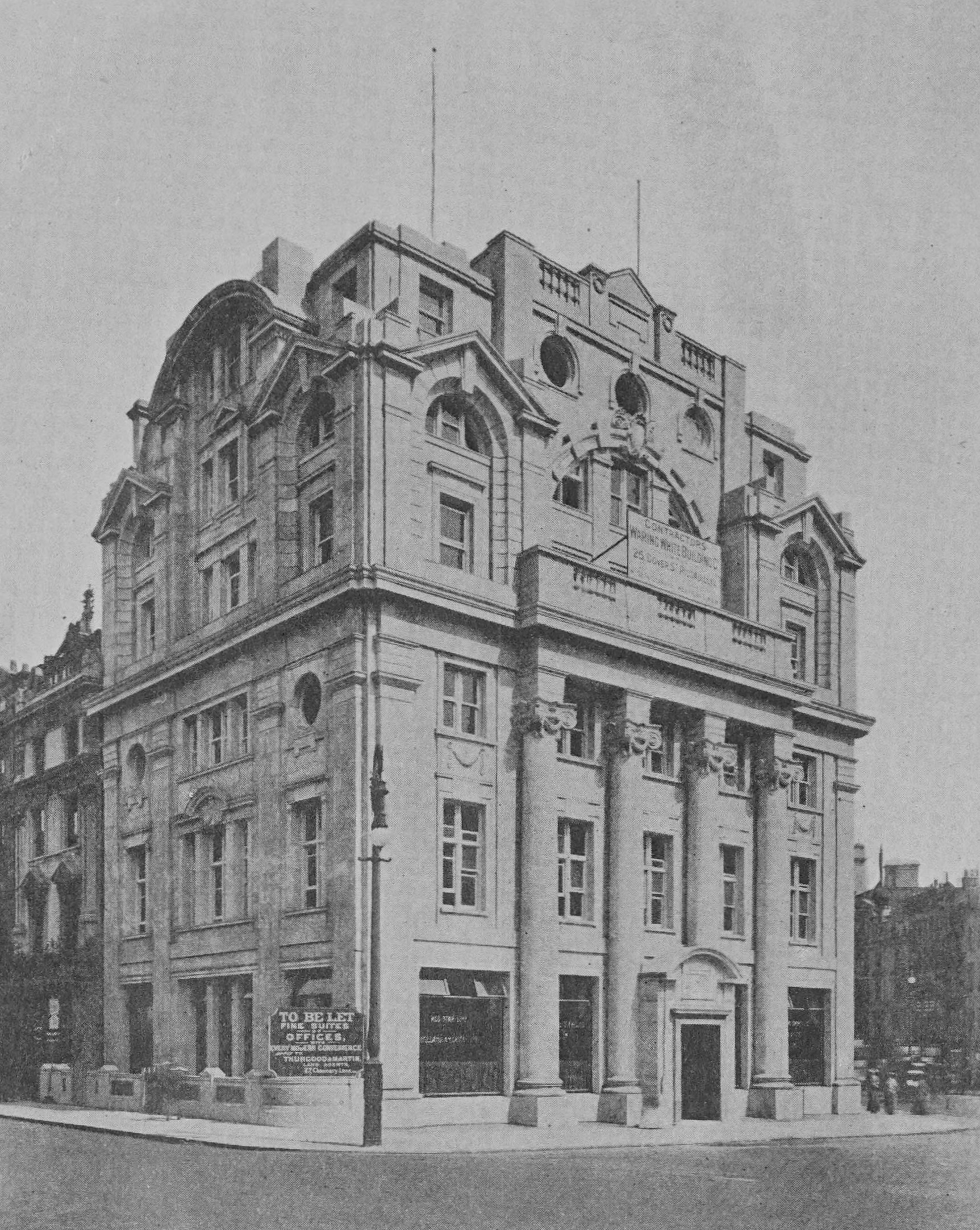
1: Oceanic House (International Navigation Company)

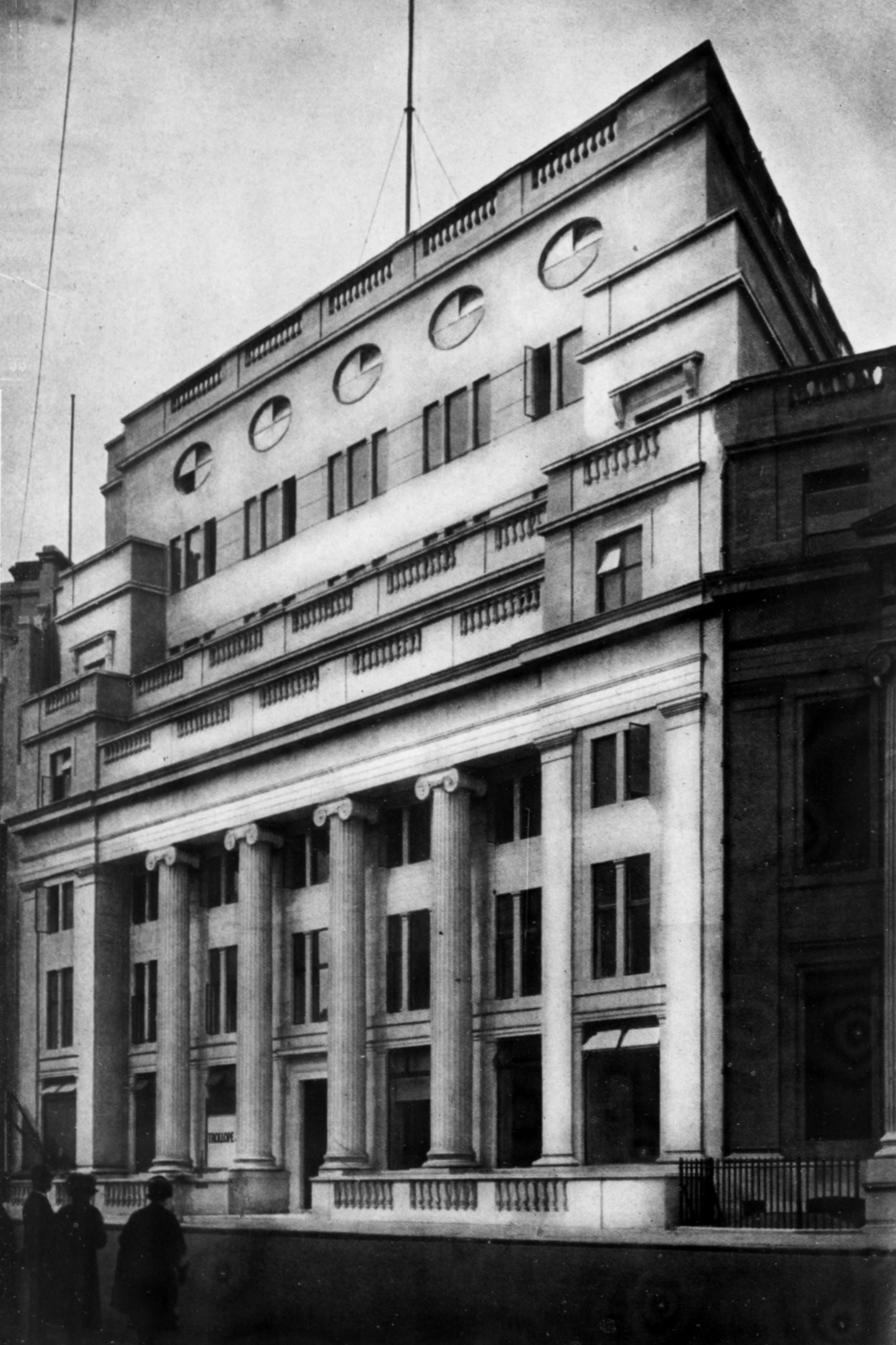
2-4: Sun Life

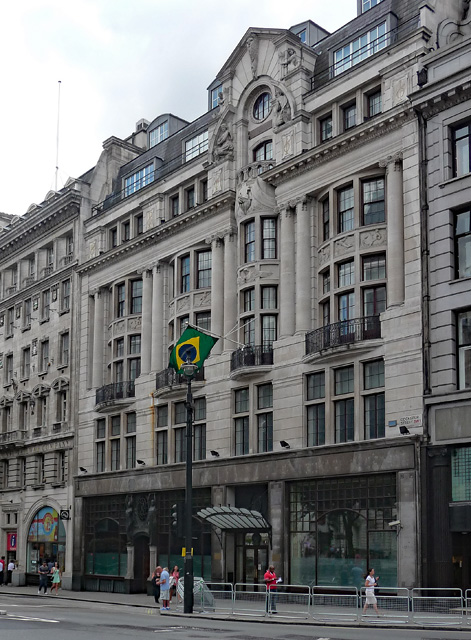
14-16: Hamburg America Line

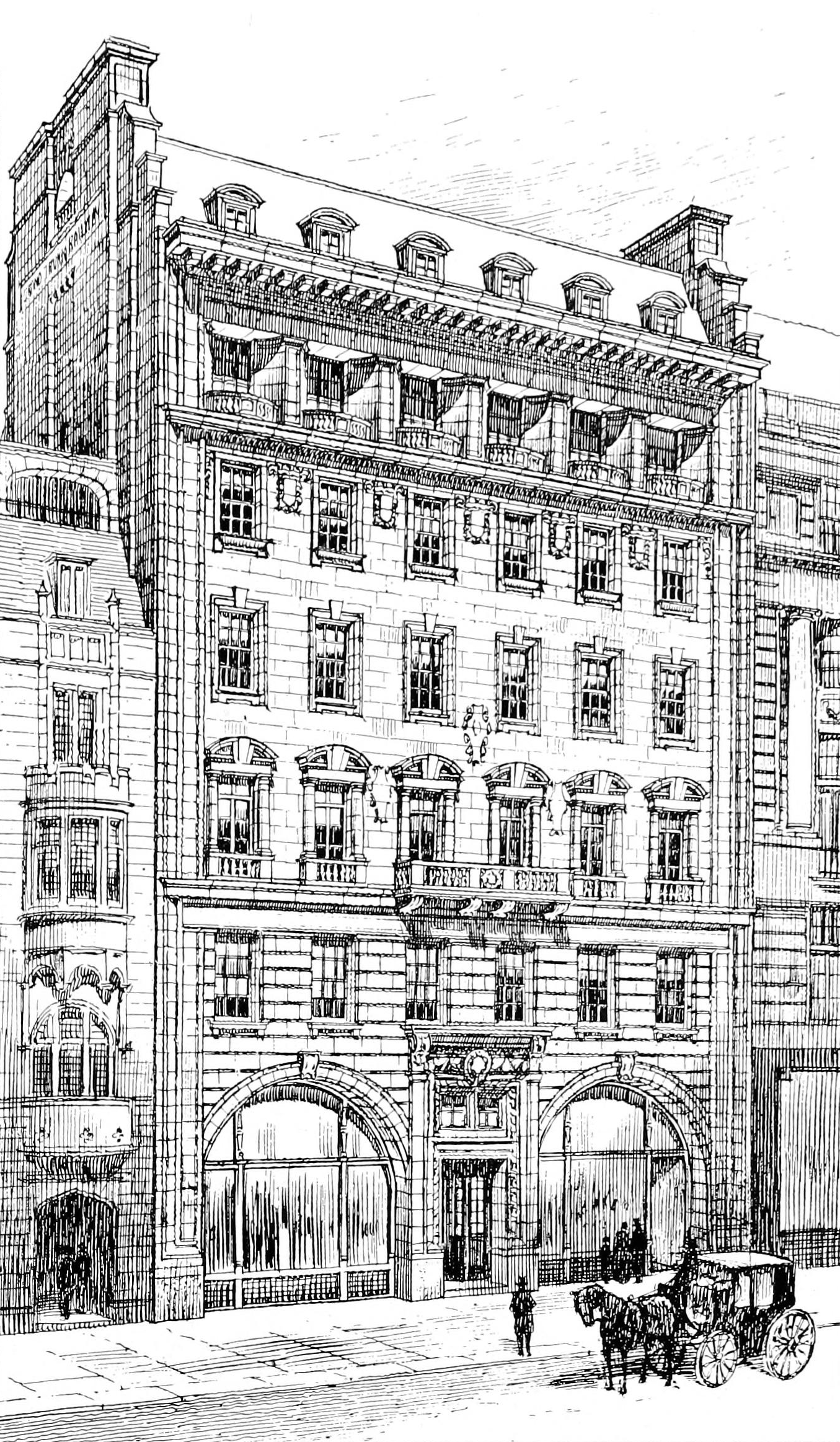
17-19: Grand Trunk Railway

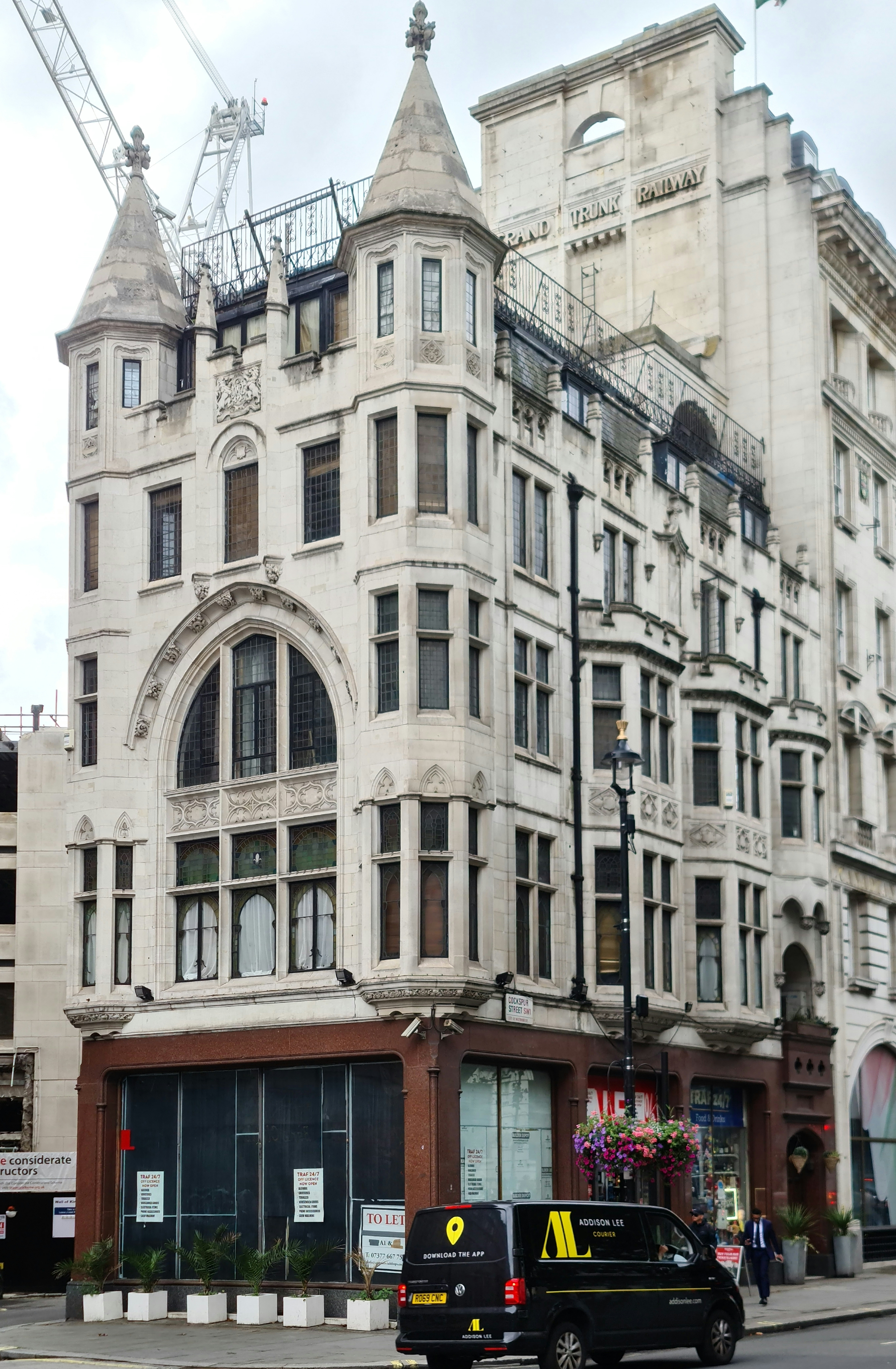
20: Compagnie Internationale des Wagons-Lits

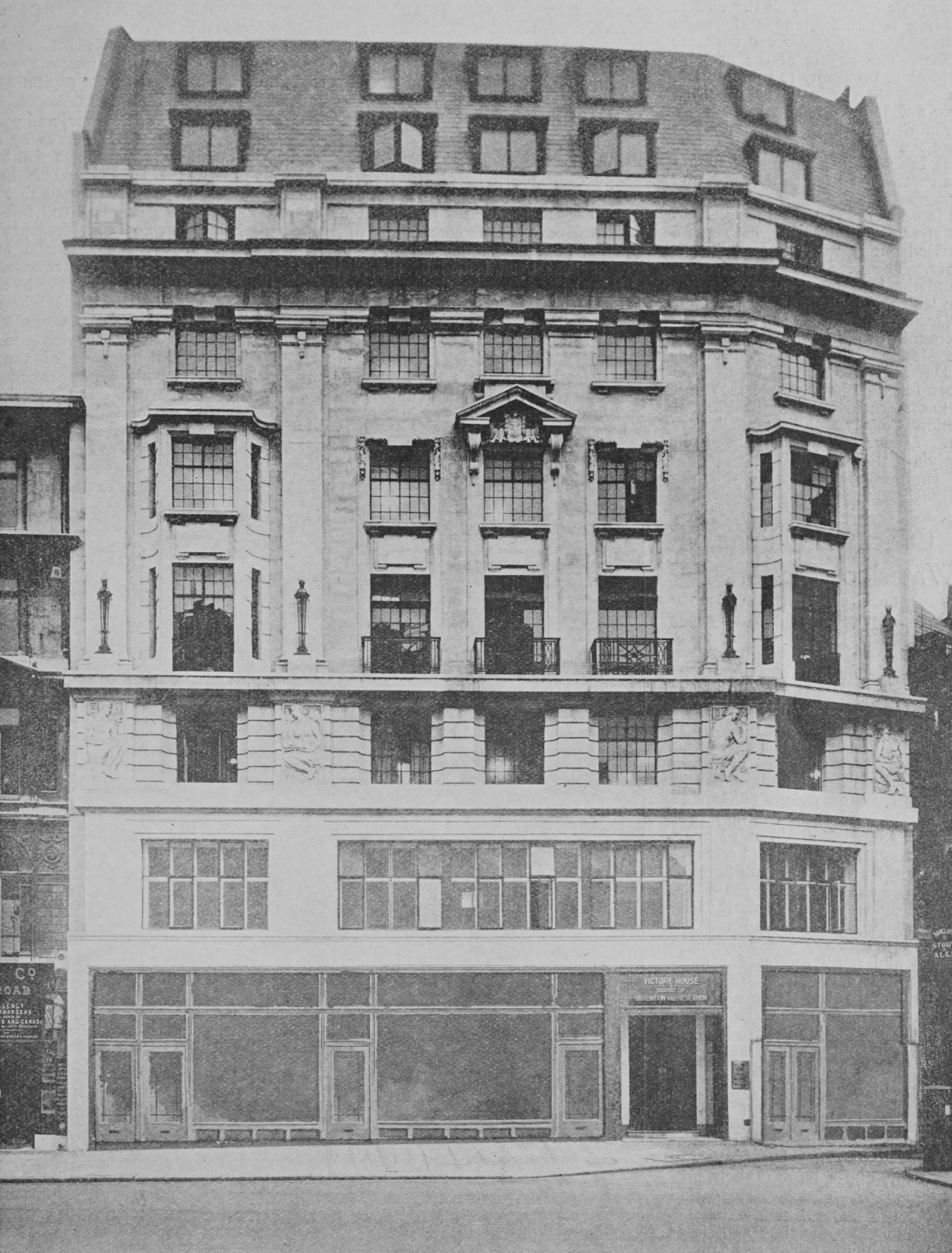
21-24: Victory House (Norwegian-British Chamber of Commerce)

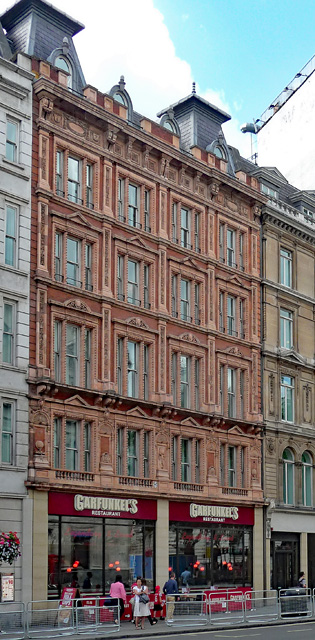
26-27: Stanfords

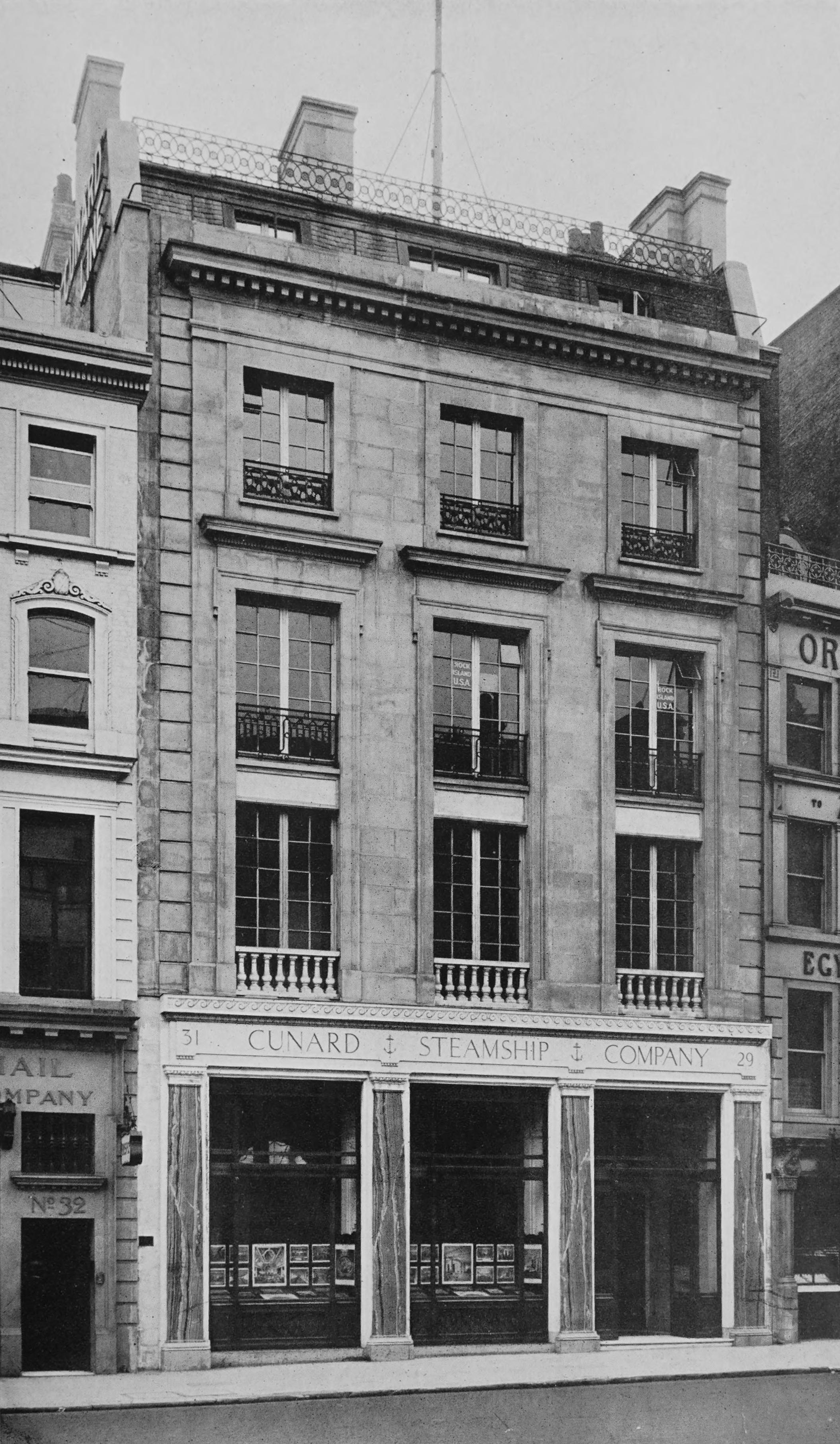
29-31: Cunard Line
