= Sydney Ernest Kennedy =

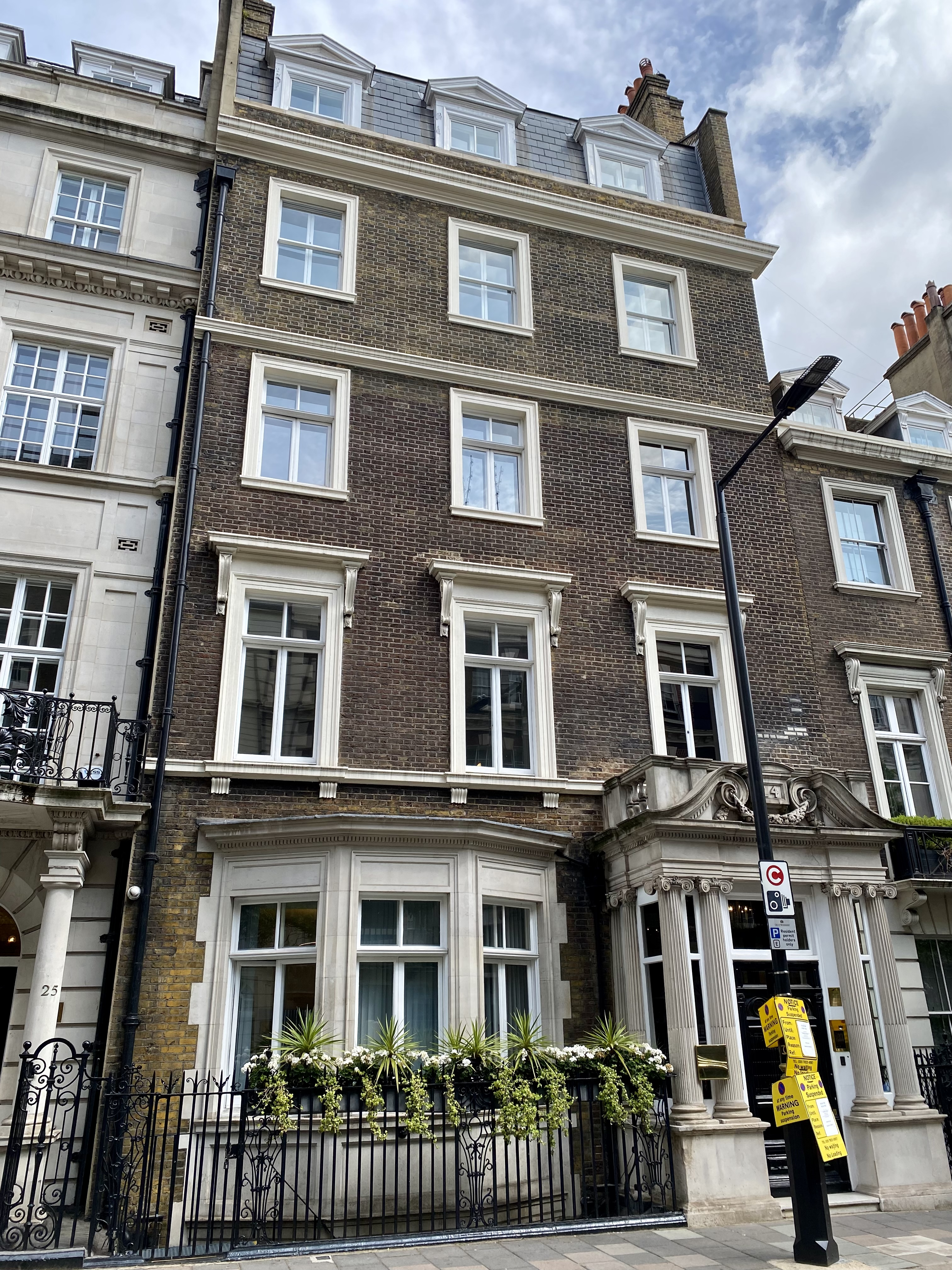
Kennedy's former residence at 24 Upper Brook Street, Mayfair

Sydney Ernest Kennedy (30 November 1854 – 8 July 1933) was a British stockbroker and art collector. He was a partner in his family firm, Sydney Kennedy & Co., and a senior trustee of the London Stock Exchange.

Kennedy was born at 27 Orsett Terrace, Paddington, London. He was the fourth-generation of his family to work for Sydney Kennedy & Co., and joined his family's business as a clerk aged 16, to work for his father. He became a partner in the firm at the age of 21. He subsequently became a member of the London Stock Exchange and was elected a trustee of the stock exchange in 1900. Kennedy received a testimonial from the proprietors of the stock exchange to mark his 27 years service as a trustee. Kennedy's obituary in The Times said of him that "To him as senior trustee fell the task of dealing with the complaints of the members which he always did with great tact and patience. ... He was always ready to extend a helping hand to those who needed it, both in the Stock Exchange and outside it and looking after the welfare of members and staff of the Stock Exchange was almost a hobby with him".

Kennedy lived at 24 Upper Brook Street in Mayfair from 1891 to 1921. He remodelled the interior of the 18th-century house in a Jacobethan style in 1906–07. The remodelling may have been carried out by Ralph Selden Wornum.

Kennedy was a significant collector of Chinese porcelain, especially pieces from the late Ming and Kangxi periods. His collection was dispersed after a two-day auction on 21 and 22 June 1916. The catalogue for the auction was considered innovative at the time as it featured colour illustrations. The auction took place after Kennedy sold his town house. Kennedy acquired pieces from other notable collectors including Ernest Grandidier, Louis Huth, Alfred Trapnell, and Edward Baring, 1st Baron Revelstoke. Kennedy's label that he affixed to his porcelain in his collection features a dolphin and his 'SEK' monogram.
