= Brook Street, London =

Street in Mayfair, London, England

Coordinates: 51.5129°N 0.1471°W

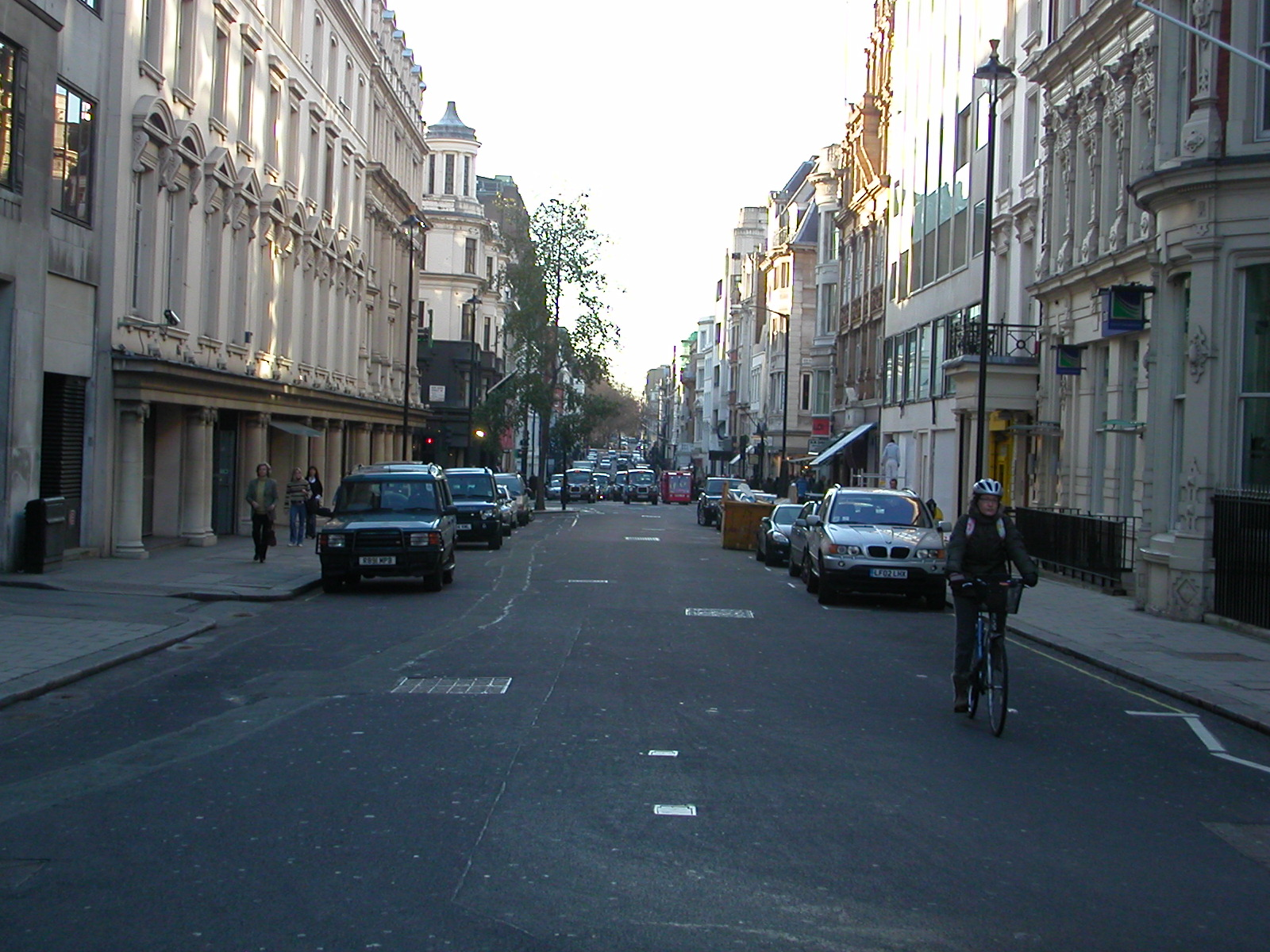
Westward view from the east end of Brook Street, close to Hanover Square

Brook Street is an axial street in the exclusive central London district of Mayfair. Most of it is leasehold, paying ground rent to and seeking lease renewals from the reversioner, that since before 1800, has been the Grosvenor Estate. Named after the River Tyburn that it crossed, it was developed in the first half of the 18th century and runs from Hanover Square to Grosvenor Square. The western continuation (to Park Lane) is called Upper Brook Street; its west end faces Brook Street Gate of Hyde Park. Both sections consisted of neo-classical terraced houses, mostly built to individual designs. Some of them were very ornate, finely stuccoed and tall-ceilinged, designed by well known architects for wealthy tenants, especially near Grosvenor Square, others exposed good quality brickwork or bore fewer expensive window openings and embellishments. Some of both types survive. Others have been replaced by buildings from later periods.

Opulent hotel Claridge's co-fronts two other streets (Note: Thus is addressed Claridges, Brook Street, London, W1K 4HR.) and takes the majority of a block. The Embassy of Argentina is at No. 65. The Handel Hendrix House occupies Nos. 23–25, once homes of famous musicians Jimi Hendrix and Handel. The baroque chamber music ensemble The Brook Street Band takes its name from No. 25 where Handel lived from 1723 to 1759.

The French restaurant Le Gavroche was housed on the primary floors of No. 43 Upper Brook Street, before its closure in January 2024.

== Former residents ==
=== Sursock family ===
The Sursock family opened their first office in Europe, at No. 31, in 1858, from which they directed commercial networks, exposing land-holdings across the eastern Mediterranean to development capital of European markets (of joint-stock equity and of credit).

=== Others ===
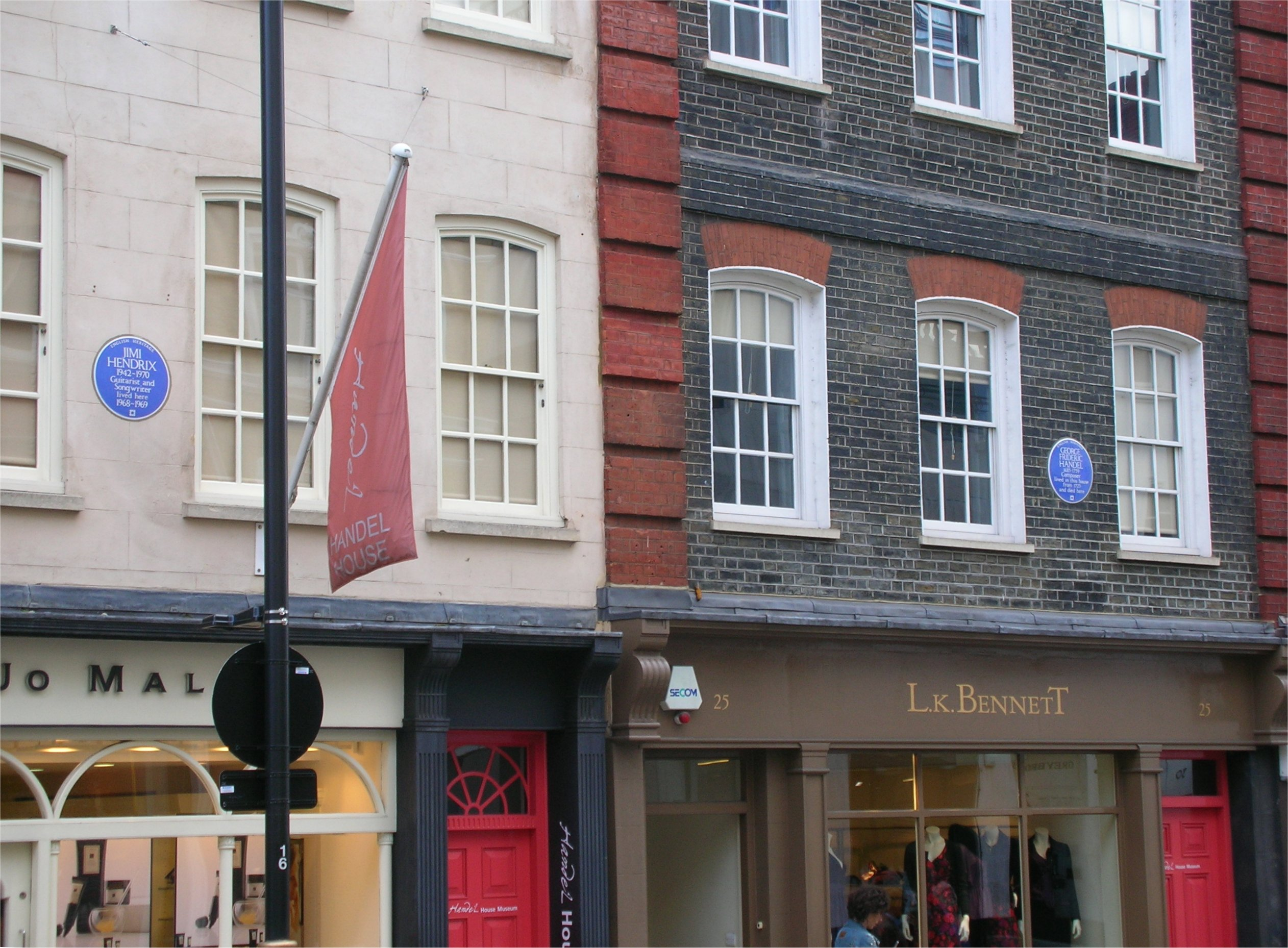
Houses of Jimi Hendrix (No. 23, left) and George Frideric Handel (No. 25), both marked with English Heritage blue plaques

Brook Street

- 20: Gerard Vandergucht, engraver and art dealer. His son, Benjamin Vandergucht, was born here in 1753.
- 23: Jimi Hendrix, guitarist
- 25: George Frideric Handel, composer
- 39: Sir Jeffry Wyatville, architect
- 39: Sibyl, Lady Colefax and John Fowler, interior decorator and interior designer
- 54: Valentine Ackland, poet, was born here.
- 67: Barry, Robin, and Maurice Gibb, musicians, better known as the Bee Gees
- 72: Sir Henry Holland, physician and travel writer, lived and died here.
- 74: Sir William Gull, Royal physician
- 74: Robert Bentley Todd, physician
- 76: Colen Campbell, architect
- 78: Ronald Firbank, novelist (Note: The highest number is 80.)

Upper Brook Street

- 1: Charles Algernon Parsons, Anglo-Irish engineer and inventor of the compound steam turbine
- 3: Sir Lucas Pepys, physician to King George III and Jane Elizabeth Leslie, 12th Countess of Rothes
- 4: Piero Malacrida de Saint-August, Nadja Malacrida, and Sir Thomas Fuller-Elliott-Drake.
- 18: Anne Seymour Damer, sculptor, died here, 1828.
- 22: Leo Bonn, founder of what became the Royal National Institute for Deaf People
- 24: Richard Bull, MP and art collector (1755–74), Sydney Ernest Kennedy, stockbroker and art collector (1891–1921)
- 27: William Gerard Hamilton, statesman, died here, 1796.
- 28: Topham Beauclerk, wit, lived here as a young child, 1745 to 1753.
- 35: William Jowitt, 1st Earl Jowitt, lawyer and politician (the interior received mosaics by Boris Anrep in 1923)
- 40: Edward Hughes Ball Hughes, Regency dandy (Note: The number no longer exists; Brook Street has most numbers from 1 to 38; then has 48A as its final set of addresses.)
- 42: Frederic Morgan, 5th Baron Tredegar (1949–1954), Welsh peer and landowner who died at No. 42 in 1954
- 51: Giorgos Seferis, Greek Ambassador, poet and Nobel laureate
- 56: David Ricardo, economist

== Notes and references ==
Footnotes

Citations
