= Sir John Leigh, 1st Baronet =

Sir John Leigh 1st Baronet

Member of Parliament for Clapham
- In office 1922–1945
- Preceded by: Sir Arthur du Cros, Bt.
- Succeeded by: John Battley

Personal details
- Born: 3 April 1884 Altrincham, Cheshire, England
- Died: 4 November 1959 (aged 75)
- Resting place: St. Michael's Church, Mickleham
- Party: Conservative
- Spouse: Norah Graces
- Parents: Egerton Leigh (father); Elizabeth Jane Gibson (mother)
- Education: Manchester Grammar School
- Occupation: Politician, mill-owner, newspaper proprietor
- Known for: Owner of the Pall Mall Gazette

Sir John Leigh, 1st Baronet (3 August 1884 – 28 July 1959) was a British mill-owner, newspaper proprietor and Conservative politician. He sat in the House of Commons from 1922 to 1945 as the Member of Parliament (MP) for Clapham. He was created a baronet in 1918.

== Early life ==
Leigh, whose family resided for generations at Pennington was descended from a cadet branch of the Barons Leigh (of the first creation) and was educated at Manchester Grammar School. He was born in Altrincham, Cheshire, the son of Egerton Leigh and Elizabeth Jane Gibson. The Leigh family, long resident at Pennington, were a cadet branch of the Barons Leigh of the first creation. He was educated at Manchester Grammar School.

== Career ==
Leigh made his fortune in the Lancashire cotton industry. In February 1918, he was created a baronet of Altrincham in Cheshire Around 1921, he purchased the Pall Mall Gazette,. At the time he was rumoured to be worth fourteen million pounds.

== Parliamentary career ==
He was elected as Member of Parliament (MP) for the Clapham division of Wandsworth at a by-election in May 1922 after the resignation of the Conservative MP Sir Arthur du Cros, and held the seat until retiring at the general election of 1945.

== Personal life ==
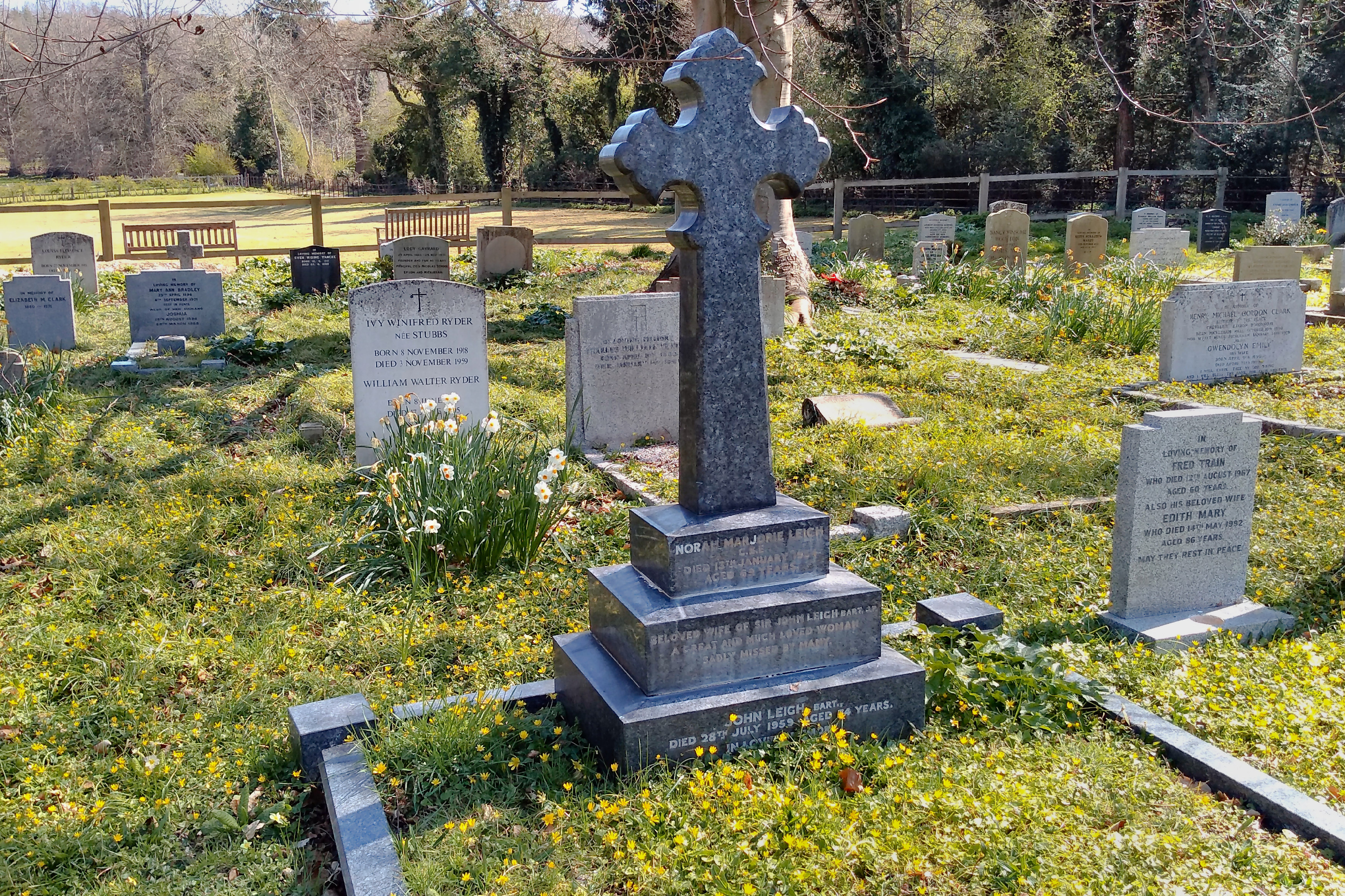
Mickleham, St. Michael's Church

Leigh married Norah Graces, who predeceased him in 1954. They were buried together in St Michael's Church, Mickleham, Surrey. He resided at Witley Park, near Godalming, Surrey.

== Coat of arms ==
The Leigh arms are blazoned as: Argent on a cross engrailed Gules a garb Or between in chief two roses of the second barbed and seeded Proper.

The crest is: A cubit arm vested Gules cuffed Argent grasping a staff in bend sinister Proper pendent therefrom a banner of the second charged with a cross couped of the first.

The family motto is: Fides servanda est ("Faith must be kept").

== See also ==
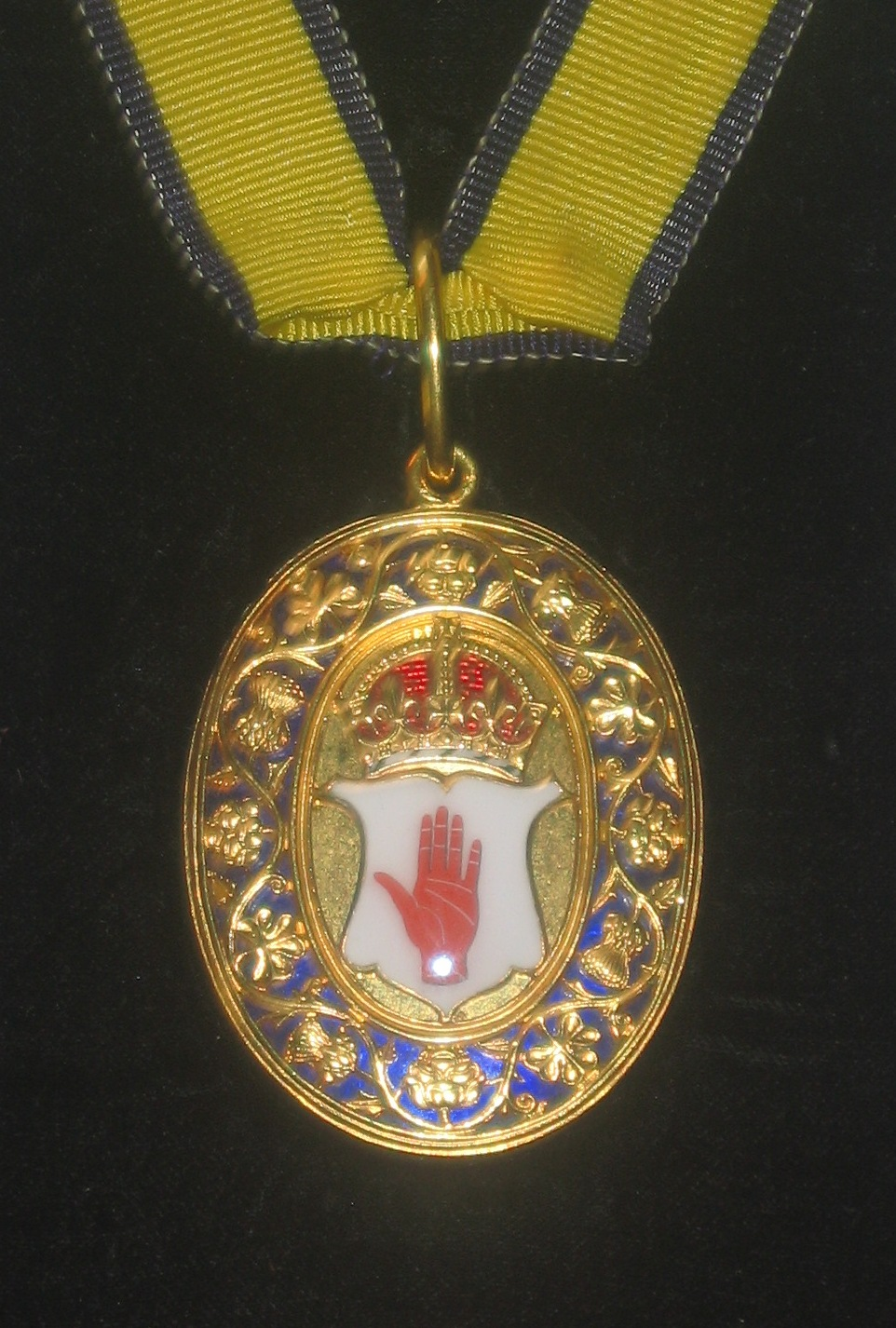

- Baronetage of the United Kingdom
- Leigh baronets

Parliament of the United Kingdom
Preceded by Sir Arthur du Cros, Bt.	Member of Parliament for Clapham; 1922 – 1945	Succeeded by John Battley
Baronetage of the United Kingdom
New title	Baronet (of Altrincham); 1918–1959	Succeeded by John Leigh
