= Du Cros baronets =

Baronetcy in the Baronetage of the United Kingdom

The du Cros (or Du Cros) Baronetcy, of Canons in the County of Middlesex, is a title in the Baronetage of the United Kingdom. It was created on 5 July 1916 for the industrialist and Conservative politician Arthur Du Cros. He was the founder, Chairman and President of the Dunlop Rubber Company and also represented Hastings and Clapham in the House of Commons.

Harvey du Cros, father of the first Baronet, was also an industrialist and like his son sat as Member of Parliament for Hastings.

== du Cros baronets, of Canons (1916) ==
- Sir Arthur Philip Du Cros, 1st Baronet (1871–1955)
- Sir Harvey Philip Du Cros, 2nd Baronet (1898–1975)
- Sir Claude Philip Arthur Mallet du Cros, 3rd Baronet (1922–2014)
- Sir Julian Claude Arthur Mallet du Cros, 4th Baronet (born 1955)

The heir apparent is the present holder's only son, Alexander Julian Mallet du Cros (born 1990).
