= 1908 Hastings by-election =

UK parliamentary by-election

The 1908 Hastings by-election was a Parliamentary by-election held on 3 March 1908. The constituency returned one Member of Parliament (MP) to the House of Commons of the United Kingdom, elected by the first past the post voting system.

== Vacancy ==
The seat had become vacant following the resignation of the sitting Unionist MP, Harvey Du Cros, on grounds of ill health. He had been the MP for the seat of Hastings since the 1906 general election.

== Electoral history ==
The seat had been Conservative since they gained it in 1906 against the national swing, having surprisingly lost it to the Liberals in 1900.

General election January 1906 Electorate 8,758
Party	Candidate	Votes	%	±%
Conservative	Harvey du Cros	4,348	52.5	+4.1
Liberal	Freeman Freeman-Thomas	3,935	47.5	−4.1
Majority		413	5.0	N/A
Turnout		8,283	94.6	+13.7
Conservative gain from Liberal		Swing	+4.1	

== Candidates ==
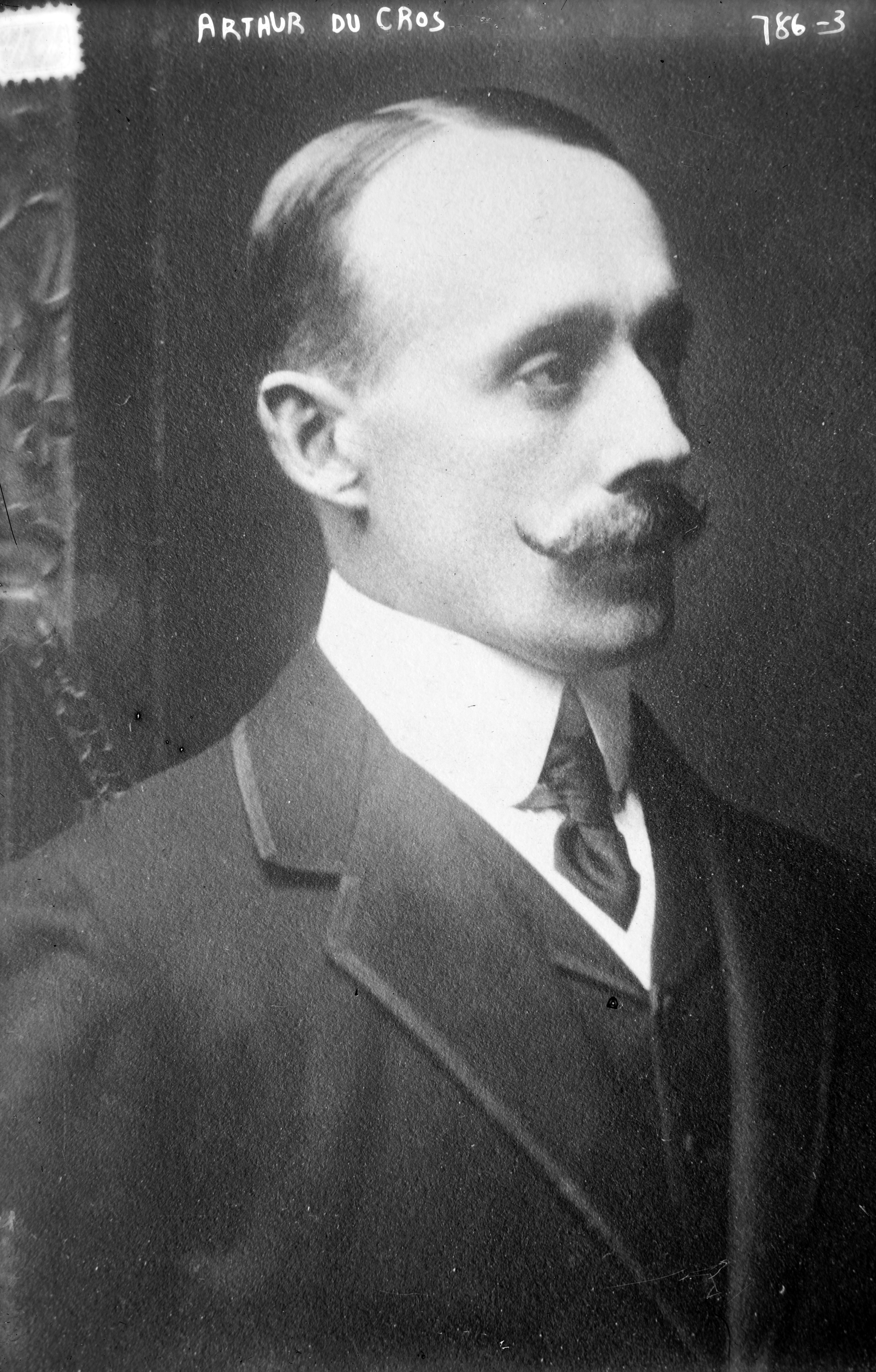
Arthur Du Cros in 1913

The Conservatives quickly adopted 37-year-old Arthur Du Cros, son of the former MP, as their new candidate. He had been born and raised in Dublin before entering the family rubber tyre manufacturing business in the Birmingham area. In 1906 Du Cros unsuccessfully contested the London seat of Bow & Bromley as a Conservative candidate.

The Liberals had no local candidate because their previous candidate Freeman Freeman-Thomas had since been elected at a by-election. There was a delay in selecting 30-year-old Robert Vernon Harcourt, the son of Sir William Harcourt as their man. Harcourt was educated at Eton College and Trinity College, Cambridge, where he took honours in the History Tripos. At Cambridge, he was a committee member of Cambridge University Liberal Club from 1899 to 1900. Harcourt went into the Foreign Service, serving as a clerk on the diplomatic establishment of the Foreign Office from 1900 to 1906. He was then briefly engaged in journalism, being parliamentary correspondent of the magazine Tribune. He stood unsuccessfully for the London County Council seat of Mile End in 1907, as a Progressive. He was standing for parliament for the first time.

== Campaign ==
Polling Day was fixed for 3 March 1908. The themes raised in the by-election ranged over many issues of the day and the clash between what was seen as the local man (Du Cros) versus the government incomer (Harcourt), even though they were both outsiders to the area.

Harcourt promoted his candidacy as that of a strong supporter of free trade.

Members of the militant Women's Social and Political Union were in Hastings campaigning for the Conservative candidate, even though he was an opponent of women's suffrage, while the Liberal candidate was a supporter.

== Result ==
The Conservatives held the seat and managed an increased majority;

Hastings by-election, 1908 Electorate 8,707
Party	Candidate	Votes	%	±%
Conservative	Arthur Du Cros	4,495	56.4	+3.9
Liberal	Robert Harcourt	3,477	43.6	−3.9
Majority		1,018	12.8	+7.8
Turnout		7,972	91.6	−3.0
Conservative hold		Swing	+3.9	

Both the Sussex Express and The Times newspapers were agreed that the Unionist victory was "first and foremost [due] to Tariff Reform and particularly to the colonial preference side of the question".

== Aftermath ==
Harcourt had to wait only a few more weeks to get into Parliament. He was adopted as Liberal candidate at a by-election at Montrose Burghs following the elevation to the peerage of the sitting member there, the veteran Liberal John Morley, was elected on 12 May 1908, and served as Member for Montrose until 1918. Du Cros held Hastings at the subsequent General Election.

General election January 1910 Electorate 9,027
Party	Candidate	Votes	%	±%
Conservative	Arthur Du Cros	4,634	54.7	−1.7
Liberal	R.Tweedy-Smith	3,833	45.3	+1.7
Majority		801	9.4	−3.4
Turnout		8,467	93.8	+2.2
Conservative hold		Swing	-1.7	

Du Cros held the seat until 1918 when he transferred to stand as a Coalition Conservative in Clapham, a seat he held until 1922.
