= Leigh Baronets of Altrincham (1918) =

The Leigh Baronetcy, of Altrincham in the County of Chester, was created in the Baronetage of the United Kingdom on 9 February 1918 for the newspaper proprietor and Conservative politician John Leigh. He was owner of the Pall Mall Gazette and represented Clapham in the House of Commons between 1922 and 1945. During World War I he funded the equipment of a hospital for wounded officers at Altrincham. As of 2023 the baronetcy is held by his grandson, Sir Christopher Leigh, 4th Baronet, who succeeded his brother in the title in 2021.

== Leigh baronets, of Altrincham (1918) ==
Escutcheon of the Leigh baronets of Altrincham

- Sir John Leigh, 1st Baronet (1884–1959)
- Sir John Leigh, 2nd Baronet (1909–1992)
- Sir Richard Henry Leigh, 3rd Baronet (1936–2021)
- Sir Christopher John Leigh, 4th Baronet (born 1941), half-brother to the 3rd Baronet.

The heir apparent to the title is the present baronet's son, Edward John Leigh (born 1970).

== Notes ==
Baronetage of the United Kingdom
Preceded by Huntington-Whiteley baronets	Leigh baronets of Altrincham; 9 February 1918	Succeeded by Stewart-Clark baronets
