= John Battley =

British politician (1880-1952)

John Rose Battley, JP FRSA (26 November 1880 – 1 November 1952) was a British printer, company director and Labour Party politician. He served on the London County Council and was Member of Parliament for Clapham for a single five-year term. He was a notable pacifist and conscientious objector.

== Early life ==
John Rose Battley was born on 26 November 1880 to George Battley, a labourer who later opened a grocer's shop, and his wife Adah Elizabeth (née Maderson), a seamstress. His mother died in 1887, according to Battley "due to working as a sempstress at her treadle sewing machine night after night into the early hours of the morning in order to help my father, who was a casual labourer, to provide their children with a fair share of bread and dripping for breakfast and tea, and boiled rice for dinner."

Battley attended the Basnett Road Elementary School, leaving aged 13 to become a printer's apprentice. He found this experience quite distressing, describing the "mischief done to my mind and soul as a lad" but later set up his own printing firm with his brother George in 1905. At a time when a week's paid holiday was standard in the printing trade, Battley Brothers offered a fortnight. In addition, they offered their employees a Sick & Funeral Fund, Endowment Fund, Hospital Savings Association, Study Circle, Staff Samaritans Fund, the firm's sports teams, pay higher than the trade union standard, Christmas boxes, a silver spoon for every baby born to an employee, as well as contributing half the cost of employees' overalls and their laundering.

== Conscientious Objector ==
Battley became a pacifist during the Boer War. In the First World War, Battley's Baptist beliefs and membership of the Fellowship of Reconciliation bade him to declare his conscientious objection. The Battersea Military Service Tribunal granted him exemption only from combatant military service; he appealed to the London county appeal tribunal, and was granted exemption from all military service conditional upon working as a market gardener.

In May 1916 he was made to dig cauliflowers in a Twickenham market garden as part of his conditional exemption. In a letter, he said; "When I tell you there are nearly 15,000 plants in cloches of 4, you can imagine my task... My arms and hands have swollen to twice their usual size and have given me ceaseless pain. My feet have been blistered (the nails on my toes turning black with pain) but I'm out to show, as I know you are, that a CO is no shirker if he is an idealist."

== Municipal contribution ==
He was also a member of the Labour Party and in 1934 he was one of the Labour candidates for Wandsworth Borough Council in the Clapham North ward; he lost narrowly. He then fought the Clapham division in the 1937 London County Council election; while unsuccessful that time, he was elected for the division by 57 votes in a by-election in May 1938. He was made a Justice of the Peace for the County of London in 1940.

== Parliament ==
At the 1945 general election, Battley won the Clapham Parliamentary seat, which had the same boundaries as his LCC division. He was a Parliamentary supporter of temperance movement, and opposed a government amendment to allow civic restaurants (former 'British restaurants' run by local authorities) to sell alcoholic liquor. He also opposed the National Service Act 1948, which continued national service for at least a further five years.

Battley never made a speech in Parliament, although he did speak in the chamber on a few occasions to ask questions of Ministers.

== Retirement ==
Although he had been elected only three years previously, Battley announced in June 1948 that he would stand down at the next general election to make way for a younger man or woman. He therefore did not contest the 1950 general election, and died two years later, after a long illness.

== Family ==
In 1933 he married Sybill Allchurch, and they had two sons: Bernard and actor David Battley.

Parliament of the United Kingdom
Preceded by Sir John Leigh	Member of Parliament for Clapham; 1945–1950	Succeeded by Charles Gibson
