= Percy Thornton =

British politician (1841–1918)

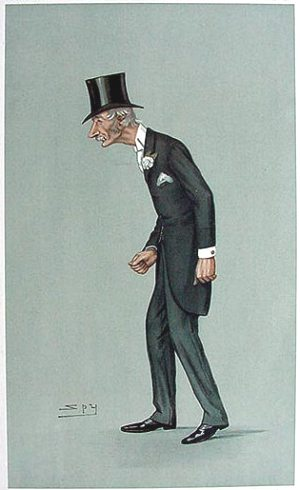
- Caricature by Spy for Vanity Fair magazine

Personal information
- Born: 29 December 1841
- Died: 8 January 1918 (aged 77)

Percy Melville Thornton (29 December 1841 – 8 January 1918) was a British Conservative politician and author.

== Biography ==
Thornton was the oldest surviving son of Rear Admiral Samuel Thornton (c.1797–1859) and his wife Emily Elizabeth née Rice. His grandfather was the abolitionist MP Samuel Thornton and his uncle was Henry Thornton, also of the Clapham Sect.

Thornton attended Harrow School and Jesus College, Cambridge. His interest in athletics led to him becoming secretary of Cambridge University Athletics Club in 1863. Three years later in 1866, Thornton won the half-mile race in the inaugural 1866 AAC Championships.

He was also a keen cricketer, inspired by his cousin Charles Inglis Thornton. From 1871 to 1899, he was Honorary Secretary of Middlesex County Cricket Club.

In 1877, Thornton married his second cousin, Florence Emily Thornton, daughter of the banker Henry Sykes Thornton. In 1880, he took up residence at the family home in Clapham.

Thornton rejected his family's adherence to Liberal politics and became a supporter of the Conservative party. In 1880, he began his writing career with the pamphlet Recovered Thread of England's Foreign Policy, which espoused Conservative policies. Thornton followed this with the three-volume Foreign Secretaries of the Nineteenth Century (1891), Harrow School and its Surroundings' (1883), The Brunswick Ascension (1887) and The Stuart Dynasty (1890).

At the general election of 1892, Thornton was elected as MP for Clapham. He successfully defended the seat three times before retiring from parliament in 1910. Following his retirement from politics, he was elected to the position of Registrar of the Royal Literary Fund, and wrote an autobiography, Some Things I Have Remembered in 1911.

Parliament of the United Kingdom
Preceded by John Saunders Gilliat	Member of Parliament for Clapham; 1892 – Jan. 1910	Succeeded by Denison Faber
