= Denison Faber, 1st Baron Wittenham =

British politician

The Right Honourable The Lord Wittenham CB DL
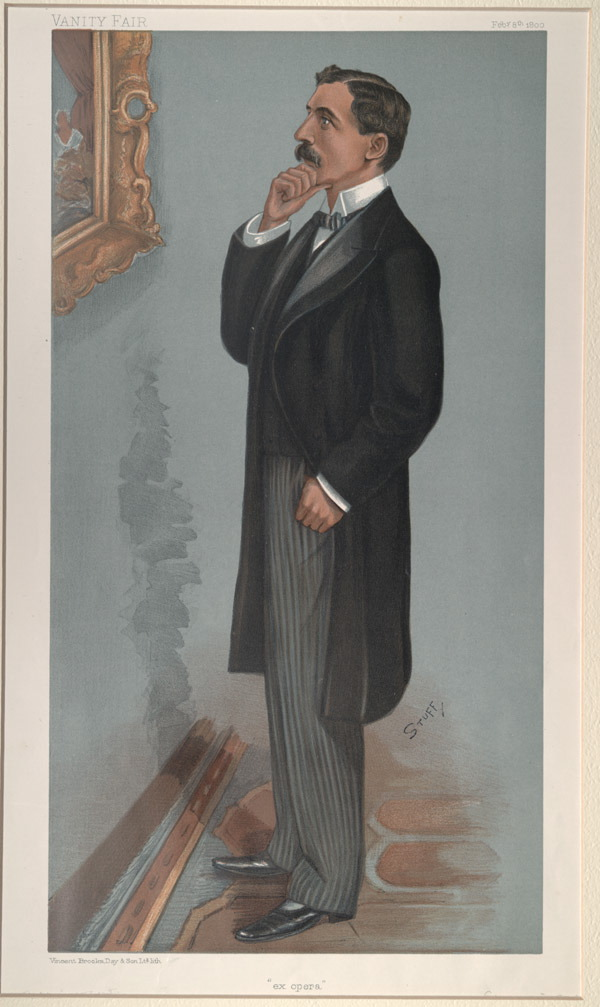
- "ex opera". Caricature by Henry Charles Seppings-Wright published in Vanity Fair in 1900.

Member of Parliament for York
- In office 24 October 1900 – 10 January 1910 Serving with John Butcher (1900–1906); Hamar Greenwood (1906–1910)
- Preceded by: John Butcher; Lord Charles Beresford
- Succeeded by: Arnold Stephenson Rowntree; John Butcher

Member of Parliament for Clapham
- In office 10 January 1910 – 21 June 1918
- Preceded by: Percy Thornton
- Succeeded by: Harry Greer

Personal details
- Born: 14 December 1852
- Died: 1 February 1931 (aged 78)
- Party: Conservative

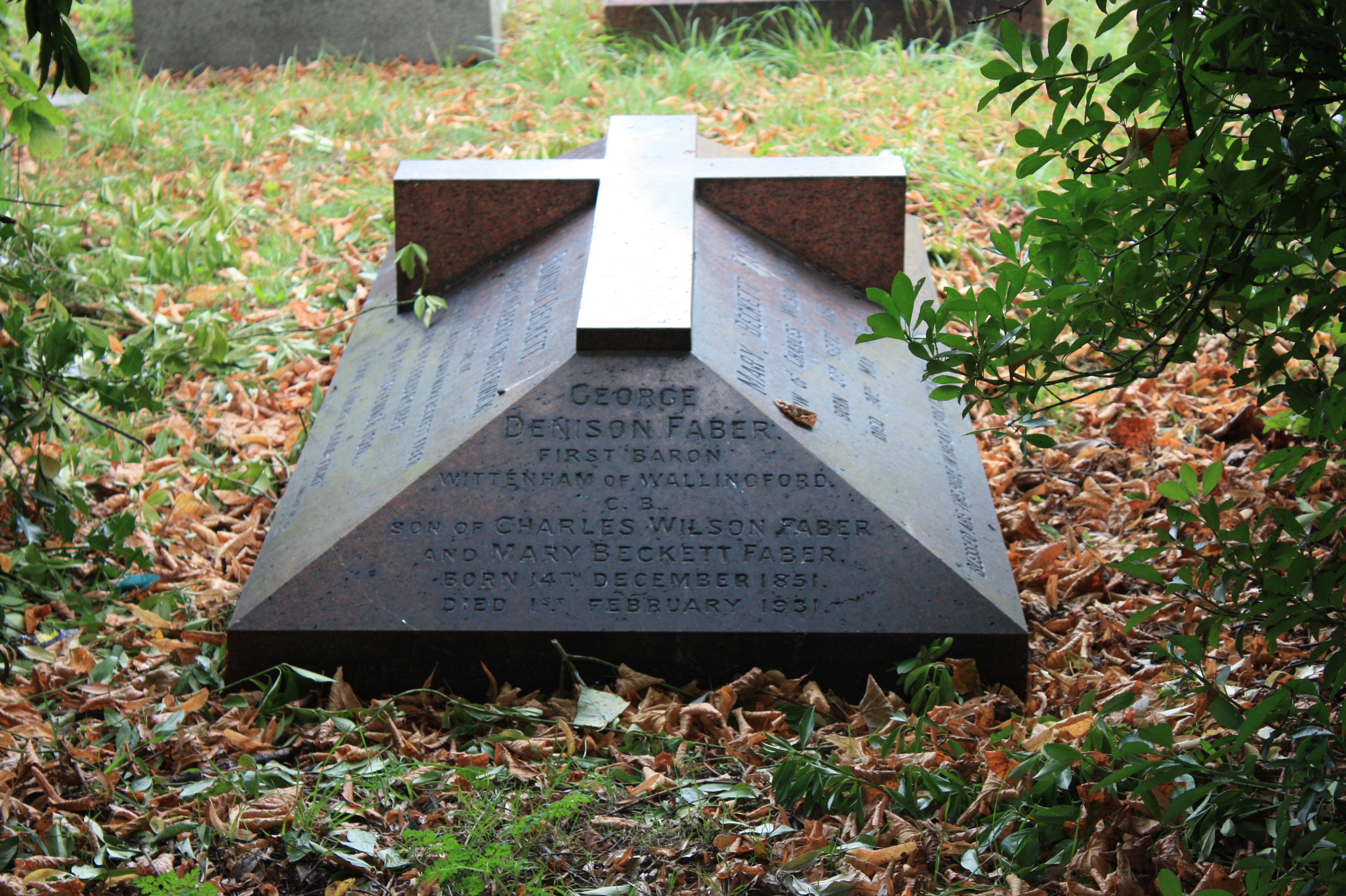
The Faber grave, Brompton Cemetery

George Denison Faber, 1st Baron Wittenham, CB, DL (14 December 1852 – 1 February 1931), known as Denison Faber, was a Conservative Party politician in the United Kingdom.

== Background and early life ==
Faber was the second surviving son of Charles Wilson Faber (1813–1878) a director of the Great Northern Railway and the nephew of Lord Grimthorpe. He was the brother of Edmund Faber, 1st Baron Faber, and of Mrs Edward Kennard (1850–1936), a novelist.

He was educated at the University of Oxford, where he graduated BA, and in 1879 was called to the Bar at Lincoln's Inn. From 1887 to 1896 he acted as Registrar of the Privy Council.

== Political career ==
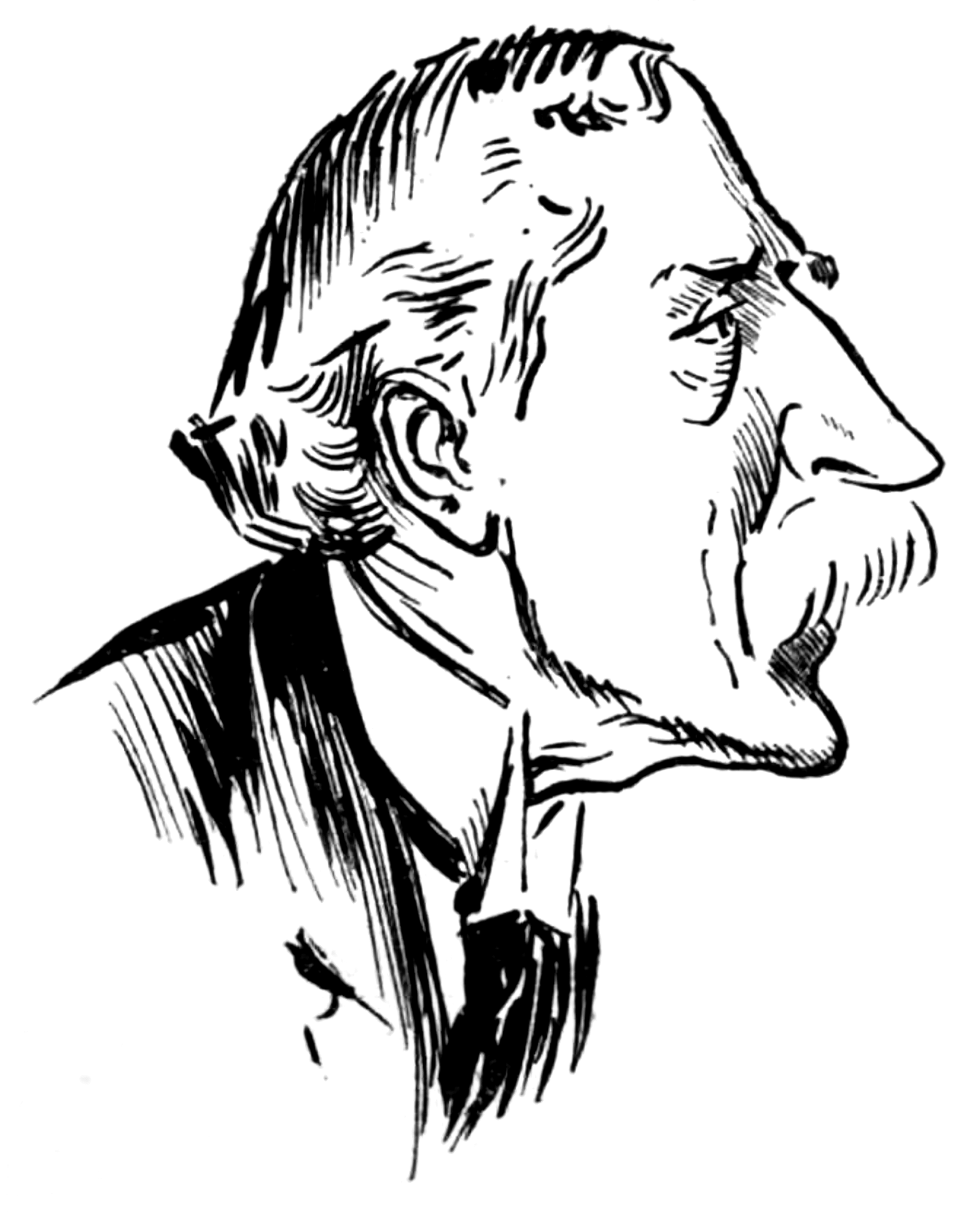
"Self-confessed Vacuity" (1913). Caricature of Denison Faber from Punch.

Faber was elected a Member of Parliament (MP) for York in a by-election on 6 February 1900, following the resignation of Lord Charles Beresford. He served until January 1910, when he lost his seat, and was again elected for Clapham from 1910 to 1918.

He was appointed a Companion of the Order of the Bath in 1905.

On 29 June 1918, he was elevated to the peerage as Baron Wittenham, of Wallingford in the County of Berkshire.

== Personal life ==
Faber married, in 1895, Hilda Georgina Graham, youngest daughter of Sir Frederick Graham, 3rd Baronet, of Netherby in Cumberland, and granddaughter of the 12th Duke of Somerset. The marriage was childless. He purchased Howbery Park, a mid-19th century house near Wallingford.

Shortly after his election in 1900, he reportedly donated £1000 (approximate value £106 000 in 2025) to the restoration of York Minster and the York Minister Organ Fund.

He died on 1 February 1931, aged 78, when the barony became extinct. He is buried with his brother Edmund in Brompton Cemetery in London. The monument is currently (2014) concealed behind shrubbery on the east side of the main entrance path from the north but has had a low tunnel created through which it may be viewed.

Parliament of the United Kingdom
Preceded by John Butcher; Lord Charles Beresford	Member of Parliament for York; Feb. 1900–Jan. 1910; With: John Butcher 1892–1906; Hamar Greenwood 1906–1910	Succeeded by Arnold Stephenson Rowntree; John Butcher
Preceded by Percy Melville Thornton	Member of Parliament for Clapham; Jan. 1910–1918	Succeeded by Harry Greer
Peerage of the United Kingdom
New creation	Baron Wittenham; 1918–1931	Extinct
