= John Saunders Gilliat =

British politician (1829–1912)

Gilliat in 1895

John Saunders Gilliat (24 November 1829 – 11 February 1912) was a British banker and Conservative politician.

== Life ==
He was the son of and Mary Anne Saunders of Fernill, Berkshire. His father was founder J K Gilliat and Company, a merchant banking company that traded in England and America. He was educated at Harrow School, and matriculated at University College, Oxford in 1848, graduating B.A. in 1851, M.A. in 1856.

In 1860 he married Louisa Babington, daughter of Matthew Babington of Rothley and Frances Sykes, with whom he had six children. His daughter, Ida Sophia Gilliat, married George Vere Hugh Cholmondeley (b. 13 Sep 1871, d. 28 Mar 1925). In 1862 he joined the court of the Bank of England, and was Governor from 1883 to 1885, having previous served as its Deputy Governor. Gilliat's tenure as Governor occurred during the Panic of 1884.

In 1886, he was elected as Conservative Member of Parliament for the Clapham constituency of south London. In 1891 he put his name forward as Conservative candidate for the parliamentary seat of St Albans, but withdrew his candidacy. He was eventually chosen to contest Widnes when the sitting MP, T C Edwards-Moss retired for health reasons. He held the seat until 1900.

Gilliat made his home at Chorleywood, Hertfordshire. He was deeply involved in the affairs of the Church of England, and was a member of the Committee For Church Defence and Church Instruction and the Bishop of St Albans's Fund as well as being one of the governors of Queen Anne's Bounty.

On his death at the age of 82 in 1912 Gilliat was the oldest member of the Court of the Bank of England.

Parliament of the United Kingdom
| Preceded by John Fletcher Moulton | Member of Parliament for Clapham; 1886–1892 | Succeeded by Percy Melville Thornton |
| Preceded by Tom Edwards-Moss | Member of Parliament for Widnes; 1892–1900 | Succeeded by William Hall Walker |
Government offices
| Preceded by Henry Riversdale Grenfell | Governor of the Bank of England; 1883 – 1885 | Succeeded by James Pattison Currie |
