= List of baronetcies in the Baronetage of the United Kingdom: L =

Peerages and baronetcies of Britain and Ireland
| Extant | All |
|---|---|
| Dukes | Dukedoms |
| Marquesses | Marquessates |
| Earls | Earldoms |
| Viscounts | Viscountcies |
| Barons | Baronies |
| Baronets | Baronetcies |
En, Ire, NS, GB, UK (extinct)

This is a list of baronetcies in the Baronetage of the United Kingdom. They have been created since 1801 when they replaced the baronetages in the Baronetage of Great Britain, and Baronetage of Ireland. This list is not currently complete.

| Title | Date of creation | Surname | Current status | Notes |
|---|---|---|---|---|
| La Fontaine of Montreal | 1854 | La Fontaine | extinct 1867 | |
| Lacon of Great Yarmouth | 1818 | Lacon | extant | |
| Lacy of Ampton | 1921 | Lacy | extant | |
| Laffan of Otham | 1828 | Laffan | extinct 1848 | |
| Lakin of The Cliff | 1909 | Lakin | extant | |
| Laking of Kensington | 1902 | Laking | extinct 1930 | |
| Lambart of Beau Parc | 1911 | Lambart | extinct 1986 | |
| Lamont of Knockdaw | 1910 | Lamont | extinct 1949 | |
| Lampson of Rowfant | 1866 | Lampson | extant | inherited by the second Baron Killearn in 1971 |
| Lane of Cavendish Square | 1913 | Lane | extinct 1972 | |
| Langman of Eaton Square | 1906 | Langman | extinct 1985 | |
| Larcom of Brandeston | 1868 | Larcom | extinct 2004 | |
| Larpent of Roehampton | 1841 | Larpent | extinct 1899 | |
| Latham of Crow Clump | 1919 | Latham | extant | |
| Latta of Portman Square | 1920 | Latta | extinct 1946 | |
| Laurie of Sevenoaks | 1942 | Laurie | extinct 1954 | Lord Mayor of London |
| Lawes of Rothamsted | 1882 | Lawes | extinct 2009 | |
| Lawrence of Sloane Gardens | 1906 | Lawrence | extant | |
| Lawrence of Ealing Park and Whitehall Place | 1867 | Lawrence | extant | |
| Lawrence of Lucknow | 1858 | Lawrence | extant | unproven (sixth Baronet died 1999) - under review |
| Lawrence of the Army | 1858 | Lawrence | extant | first Baronet created Baron Lawrence in 1869 |
| Lawrence of Westbourne Terrace | 1869 | Lawrence | extinct 1897 | Lord Mayor of London |
| Lawson of Brayton | 1831 | Lawson | extinct 1959 | |
| Lawson of Brough Hall | 1841 | Lawson, Howard-Lawson | extant | |
| Lawson of Knavesmire Lodge | 1905 | Lawson | extinct 1973 | |
| Lawson of Westwood Grange | 1900 | Lawson | extant | |
| Layland-Barratt of the Manor House and of Tregarne Lodge | 1908 | Layland-Barratt | extinct 1968 | |
| Le Marchant of Chobham Place | 1841 | Le Marcham | extant | |
| Lea of The Larches and Sea Grove | 1892 | Lea | extant | |
| Lechmere of Hanley Castle | 1818 | Lechmere | extant | |
| Lee of Lukyns | 1941 | Lee | extinct 1967 | |
| Leeds of Croxton Park | 1812 | Leeds | extant | |
| Lees of Black Rock | 1804 | Lees | extant | |
| Lees of Longendale | 1937 | Lees | extant | |
| Lees of Lytchet Manor | 1897 | Lees | extant | |
| Leese of Worfield | 1908 | Leese | dormant | fourth Baronet died 1979 |
| Leigh of Altrincham | 1918 | Leigh | extant | |
| Leigh of Whitley | 1815 | Leigh | extinct 1844 | |
| Leighton | 1886 | Leighton | extinct 1896 | first Baronet created Baron Leighton in 1896 |
| Leith of Newcastle-upon-Tyne | 1919 | Leith | extinct 1956 | |
| Lennard of Wickham Court | 1880 | Lennard | extinct 1980 | |
| Leon of Bletchley Park | 1911 | Leon | extant | |
| Leslie of Glasslough | 1876 | Leslie | extant | |
| Lethbridge of Westway House, Winkley Court and Sandhill Park | 1804 | Lethbridge | extant | |
| Lett of Walmer | 1941 | Lett | extinct 1964 | |
| Lever of Allerton | 1920 | Lever | extinct 1947 | |
| Lever of Hans Crescent | 1911 | Lever | extant | |
| Lever of Hulme | 1911 | Lever | extinct 2000 | first Baronet created Viscount Leverhulme in 1922 |
| Levy-Lawson of Hall Barn and Peterborough Court | 1892 | Levy-Lawson, Lawson | extant | first Baronet created Baron Burnham in 1903; second Baron created Viscount Burnham in 1919, which title became extinct in 1933 |
| Levy of Humberstone Hall | 1913 | Levy | extinct 1996 | |
| Lewis of Hyde Park Gate | 1887 | Lewis | extinct 1893 | |
| Lewis of Essendon Place | 1918 | Lewis | extinct 1978 | first Baronet created Baron Essendon in 1932 |
| Lewis of Harpton Court | 1846 | Lewis | extinct 1911 | |
| Lewis of Portland Place | 1902 | Lewis | extinct 1945 | |
| Lewis of Nantgwyne | 1896 | Lewis | dormant | first Baronet created Baron Merthyr in 1911; third Baron and third Baronet died 1977 |
| Lewthwaite of Broadgate | 1927 | Lewthwaite | extinct 2004 | |
| Ley of Lazonby Hall | 1905 | Ley | extant | |
| Lindsay-Hogg of Rotherfield Hall | 1905 | Lindsay-Hogg | extant | |
| Lindsay of Dowhill | 1962 | Lindsay | extant | unproven (second Baronet died 2005) - under review |
| Lipton of Osidge | 1902 | Lipton | extinct 1931 | |
| Lister of Lyme Regis | 1883 | Lister | extinct 1912 | first Baronet created Baron Lister in 1897 |
| Lithgow of Ormsary | 1925 | Lithgow | extant | |
| Llewellyn of Baglan | 1959 | Llewellyn | dormant | second Baronet died 1994 |
| Llewellyn of Bwllfa | 1922 | Llewellyn | extant | |
| Lloyd of Bromwydd | 1863 | Lloyd | extinct 1933 | |
| Lloyd of Lancing | 1831 | Lloyd | extinct 1844 | |
| Lloyd of Rhu | 1960 | Lloyd | extant | |
| Lockhart of Lee and Carnwath | 1806 | Lockhart | extinct 1919 | |
| Locock of Speldhurst and Hertford Street | 1857 | Locock | extinct 1965 | |
| Loder of Whittlebury | 1887 | Loder | extant | |
| Longman of Lavershot Hall | 1909 | Longman | extinct 1940 | |
| Lonsdale of Pavilion | 1911 | Lonsdale | extinct 1924 | first Baronet created Baron Armaghdale in 1918 |
| Lopes of Maristow House | 1805 | Lopes | extant | fourth Baronet created Baron Roborough in 1938 |
| Louis of Chelston | 1806 | Louis | extinct 1949 | |
| Low of Kilmaron | 1908 | Low, Low-Morrison | extant | |
| Lowe of Edgbaston | 1918 | Lowe | extant | |
| Lowson of Westlaws | 1951 | Lowson | extant | Lord Mayor of London |
| Lowther of Belgrave Square | 1914 | Lowther | extinct 1916 | |
| Lowther of Swillington | 1824 | Lowther | extant | |
| Lubbock of London | 1806 | Lubbock | extant | fourth Baronet created Baron Avebury in 1900 |
| Lucas-Tooth of Queen's Gate and Kameruka | 1906 | Lucas-Tooth | extinct 1918 | |
| Lucas of Ashtead Park and Lowestoft | 1887 | Lucas | dormant | fourth Baronet died 1980 |
| Lumsden of Auchindour | 1821 | Lumsden | extinct 1821 | |
| Lusk of Colney Park | 1874 | Lusk | extinct 1909 | Lord Mayor of London |
| Lyell of Kinnordy | 1864 | Lyell | extinct 1875 | |
| Lyell of Kinnordy | 1894 | Lyell | extinct 2017 | first Baronet created Baron Lyell in 1914 |
| Lyle of Glendelvin | 1929 | Lyle | extant | |
| Lyle of Greenock | 1915 | Lyle | extinct 1923 | |
| Lyle of Canford Cliffs | 1932 | Lyle | extinct 1976 | first Baronet created Baron Lyle of Westbourne in 1945 |
| Lyons of Christchurch | 1840 | Lyons | extinct 1887 | first Baronet created Baron Lyons in 1856; second Baron created Viscount Lyons in 1881 |
| Lyons of Grateley | 1937 | Lyons | extinct 1963 | first Baronet created Baron Ennisdale in 1939 |
| Lytton of Knebworth | 1838 | Lytton | extant | first Baronet created Baron Lytton in 1866, second Baron created Earl of Lytton in 1880 |
