= 1922 Clapham by-election =

UK parliamentary by-election

The 1922 Clapham by-election was held on 9 May 1922. The by-election was held due to the resignation of the incumbent Coalition Conservative MP, Sir Arthur du Cros, Bt.

Sir John Leigh

It was won by the Coalition Conservative candidate Sir John Leigh, 1st Baronet.

== Candidates ==
Clapham Liberal Association decided not to contest the by-election.
