= W & G Du Cros =

Motor importer and dealership business

W & G Du Cros Limited, also well-known as W & G, was a business established in 1901 as a motor importers and dealership by Harvey Du Cros, founder of the pneumatic tyre industry also founder and head of the Dunlop Rubber Company and a major investor in businesses connected to the automobile. It grew into a major taxicab business and car and commercial motor-body builder which manufactured it own brand lorries and passenger vehicles.

It became a subsidiary of a major car manufacturing combine which fell into financial difficulties in the Great Depression and W & G Du Cros closed its doors in 1935.

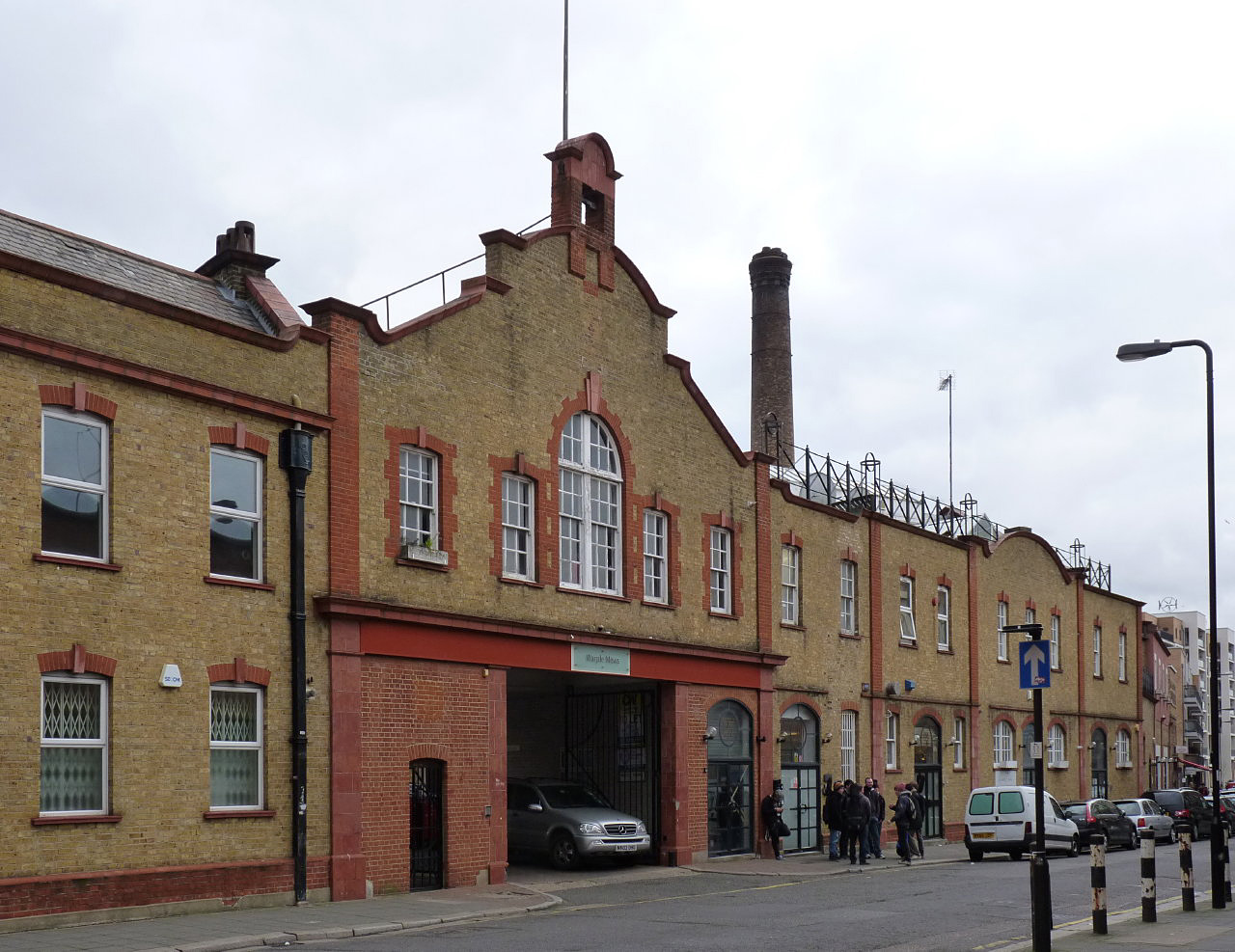
Street frontage of the former W & G Du Cros Works in Warple Way, Acton, London

== Panhard ==
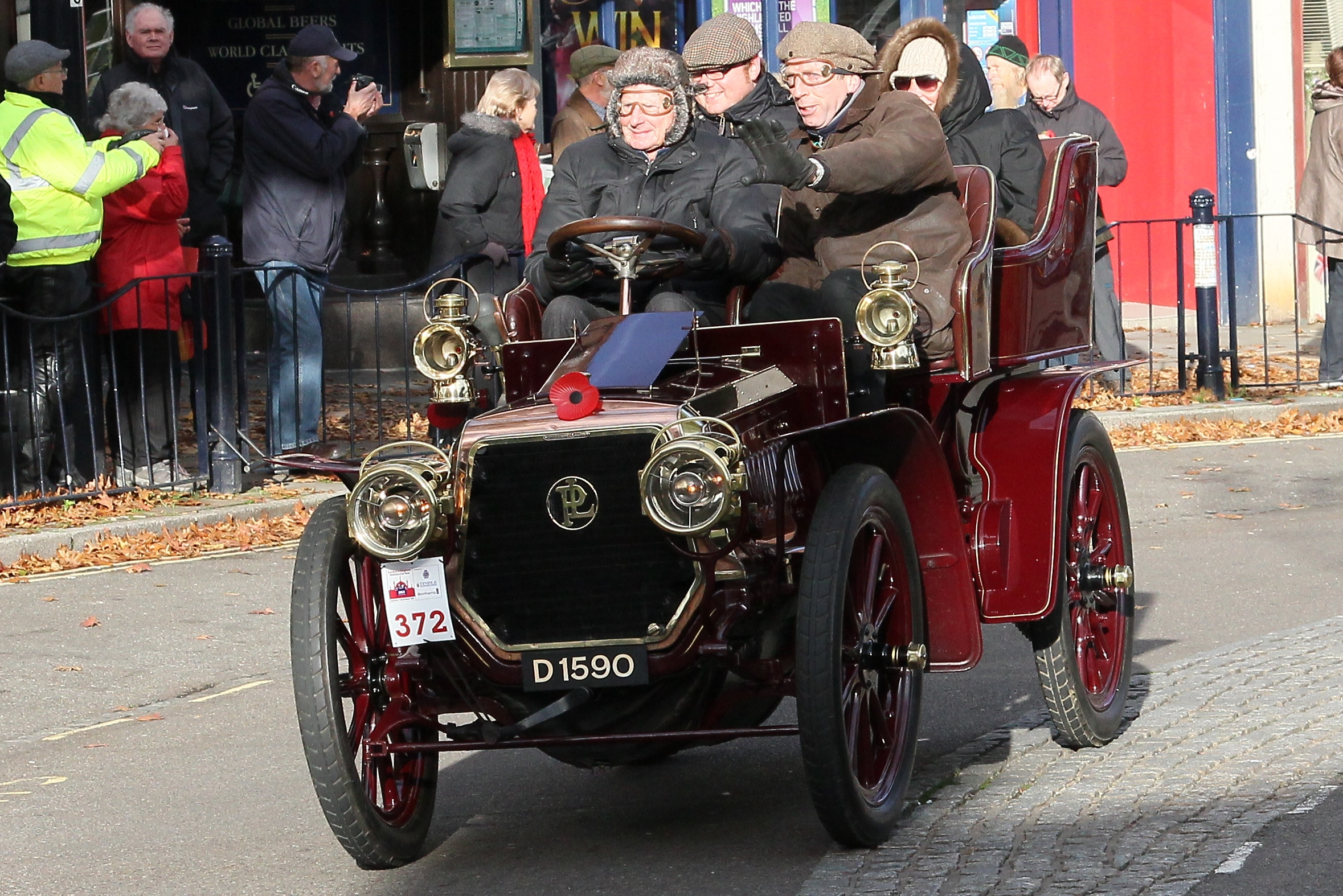
1902 Panhard & Levassor tonneau leaving London

Though Dunlop was late to move into the manufacture of car tyres Lord Montagu of Beaulieu persuaded Du Cros to buy a French Panhard & Levassor. Impressed, Du Cros obtained the rights to sell Panhard & Levassor cars in Britain and Ireland and the colonies. A showroom was set up in Lower Regent Street, London W1 at the junction with Carlton Street on the ground floor of Dunlop Rubber's head office.

Harvey's youngest sons, William and George Du Cros, were directors of Dunlop but found time to attend the Paris exhibitions as British concessionaires to welcome English-speaking visitors to Panhard & Levassor's displays. The business extended to Ireland where they were retailers of Mercedes, Swift and Austin cars as well as Panhard & Levassor. Harvey Du Cros had major holdings in Swift and Austin and was Austin's deputy chairman. The Panhards were serviced and repaired in premises in Kimberley Road Willesden Lane NW.

== Taxicabs ==
They established one of London's major taxi fleets using Napier as well as Panhard & Levassor taxicabs. Both brands of the taxis had yellow bonnets to their engines, W & G was inscribed on their radiators and their drivers wore special grey uniforms. New premises were bought in Warple Way Acton to provide a depot and service facilities tor the taxicab business. These new premises also included a foundry. In 1908 W & G Du Cros was incorporated as a limited liability company and William and George Du Cros were joint managing directors. In 1910 W & G Du Cros employed about one thousand drivers and in Warple Way, close to Napier's Works, they made taxicab bodies. Offices were in the same block of buildings but at number 177 Acton Vale, on the corner of Warple Way and Acton Vale. From cab bodies they moved on to lorry bodies and then complete W & G lorries using bought-in engines and mechanicals. In 1920 they listed W & G delivery vans with 23.7 hp and 25 hp engines and 30cwt and 40cwt capacities.

Before the First World War they operated more than 450 Napier cabs and some 150 Panhards. After 1910 trade slackened from the competition of much cheaper underground and rail bus and tram services. By this time W & G Du Cros employed more than 1,000 drivers and operated 600 cabs. The trade moved towards owner-drivers and small companies. By 1912 many cabs had been converted to delivery vans and works space into a parcels repository.

== Bodies ==
Following the First World War there was serious over-capacity in the motor body building business because of its enormous expansion during the war making aircraft wings and fuselages. In the summer of 1920 it was revealed that Darracq about to become S T D Motors were completing the purchase of all the share capital of W & G Du Cros and their engineering body-building and foundry works by the issue of preference shares. The Warple Way premises were close to those of the Darracq Motor Engineering Company.

== STD Motors ==
In 1920, the company sold out to STD Motors Ltd, which needed additional body-building capacity next to its Darracq works. In the 1920s Du Cros built lorry and charabanc chassis and in 1926 announced a new low-frame six-cylinder bus. Many of these buses were given bodywork by the Du Cros concern in the 1920s. A 1921 commercial directory described the current business as W & G Du Cros Limited, motor and general engineers, 177 The Vale, Acton London W3 —specialty W & G commercial vehicle chassis, repairers of motor cars, vans and lorries, founders.

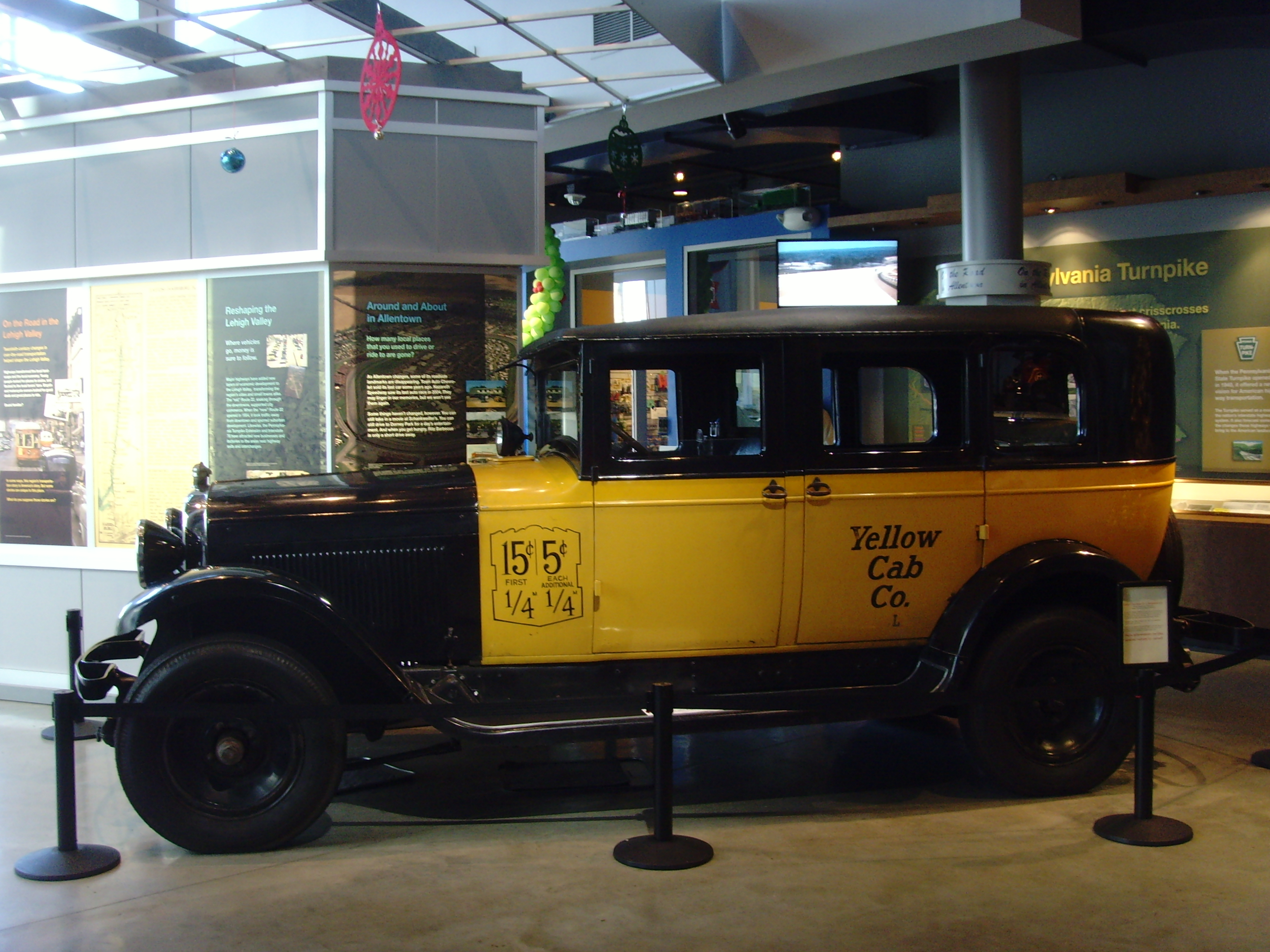
US assembled Yellow Cab

== Yellow Cab ==
Postwar W & G introduced American made but locally assembled Yellow Cabs About 100 yellow cabs appeared in London in the autumn of 1923 after some years of planning to introduce a French design to replace the prewar vehicles.

== Thrupp & Maberly ==
When S T D Motors went into receivership in 1935 the Du Cros operation was closed down. The Warple Road Works became the premises of Rootes' up to that time West End subsidiary, the coachbuilders Thrupp & Maberly.
