= Arthur Du Cros =

British industrialist and politician

Sir Arthur Du Cros Bt
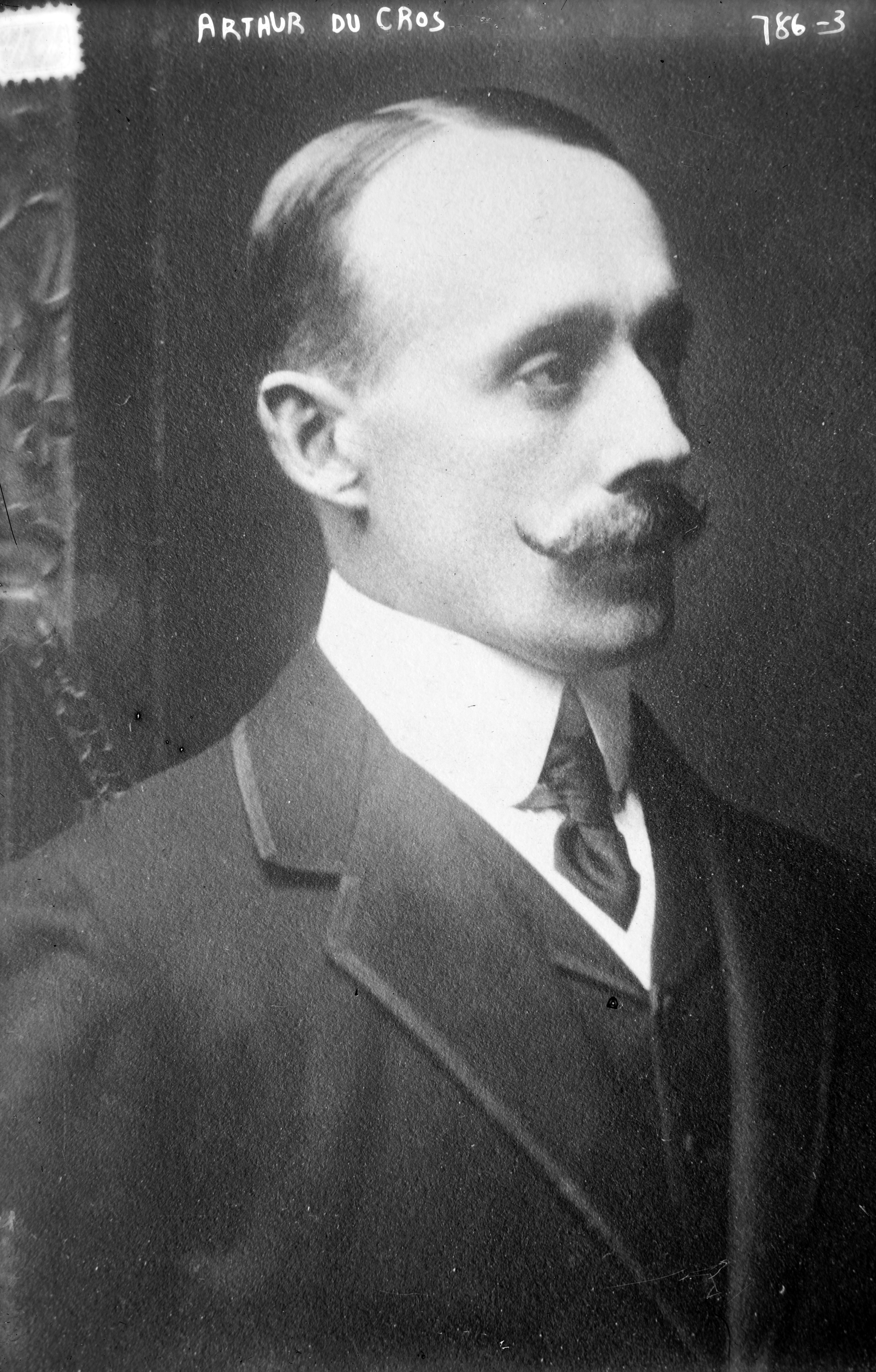
- Arthur du Cros in 1913

Member of Parliament for Hastings
- In office 4 March 1908 – 25 November 1918
- Preceded by: Harvey du Cros
- Succeeded by: Laurance Lyon

Member of Parliament for Clapham
- In office 28 December 1918 – 26 October 1922
- Preceded by: Harry Greer
- Succeeded by: John Leigh

Personal details
- Born: 26 January 1871
- Died: 28 October 1955 (aged 84)
- Spouse(s): Maude Gooding (m. 1895 div. 1923); Florence King (m. 1928); Mary Beaumont
- Children: 2 sons, 2 daughters

Sir Arthur Philip Du Cros, 1st Baronet (26 January 1871 – 28 October 1955) was a British industrialist and politician.

== Early life and education ==
Du Cros was born in Dublin on 26 January 1871, the third of seven sons of Harvey du Cros and his wife Annie Jane Roy. In his childhood, his father was only a bookkeeper with an income of £170 a year and Arthur grew up in modest circumstances. He attended a national school in Dublin and entered the civil service at the lowest-paid grade.

== Business career ==
In 1892 he joined his father and brothers in Dublin's Pneumatic Tyre and Booth's Cycle Agency. This business had been set up in 1889 by Harvey du Cros and J B Dunlop to exploit Dunlop's pneumatic tyre. Arthur was made general manager. His brothers had been or were later sent to Europe and America to develop their family's pneumatic tyre interests there.

After J B Dunlop retired in 1895. Terah Hooley bought the business, now named Pneumatic Tyre Co, in 1896 for £3 million and for a return of £5 million floated a new listed company on the stock market to own it. Hooley called the new company The Dunlop Pneumatic Tyre Company though J B Dunlop had no financial link to it. Arthur was made a joint managing director alongside his father but Harvey du Cros was also chairman.

From 1890 Pneumatic Tyre and Booth's Cycle Agency (later Dunlop Pneumatic Tyre Company) made its (cycle) tyres in Coventry by assembling bought-in components on its own machines and through its 1894 investment in Byrne Brothers also made cycle tyres in Birmingham. Byrne Brothers was renamed Rubber Manufacturing Company in 1896 and again, in 1900, renamed Dunlop Rubber Company. By 1914, 4,000 were employed at Castle Bromwich and 12,000 in 1927 when Dunlop controlled 90 per cent of national tyre production though imports limited their share of the UK tyre sales market to 60 per cent.

In August 1912 the Dunlop Pneumatic Tyre Company went out of business though retaining certain financial commitments. It passed its activities to Dunlop Rubber in exchange for shares. Then it changed its name to The Parent Tyre Company Limited. Dunlop Rubber purchased certain of its assets including goodwill and trading rights and in exchange the tyre company shareholders now owned three-quarters of Dunlop Rubber. The amalgamation was intended to bring about a substantial reduction in overhead and clarify what had been seen as a confusing relationship between the two enterprises when they shared most shareholders.

Du Cros was made managing director and deputy chairman in 1912 and retained that position after his father's death in 1918 when A L Ormrod became chairman until 1921.

In 1928 Du Cros and his brothers Alfred and George finally resigned as president, vice-president and director of Dunlop though they had been on leave of absence from the board since March 1924.

=== Business and financial impropriety ===
During the period 1912-1921, when Du Cros was chief executive, his family interests dominated the board and this period featured much financial impropriety. He found it difficult to distinguish between personal and company assets, using company funds to sponsor family investments and appointing family members to senior positions without regard for merit. He also participated in financial manipulation as a close associate of James White, a financier who specialised in share rigging and whose actions left Dunlop close to bankruptcy in 1921. Du Cros had already lost influence within the company and was dismissed after the 1921 depression.

=== Personal financial demise ===
Du Cros had significant personal investments with Clarence Hatry. The collapse of Hatry's group in 1929 and subsequent criminal fraud proceedings cost du Cros's personal company £3 million, and his personal fortunes never recovered.

== Political career ==
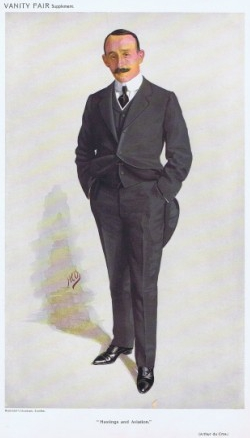
Arthur Du Cros, Vanity Fair, 1910

In 1906 Du Cros entered politics, unsuccessfully contesting the seat of Bow & Bromley as a Conservative candidate, a seat to which his brother was elected in 1910. At a by-election in 1908 he was elected Member of Parliament for Hastings, immediately succeeding his father in that position.

In 1909 he formed (and was the director of) the Parliamentary Aerial Defence Committee to ensure funding for military aeronautical development, of which he was a strong proponent. During the First World War he worked for the Ministry of Munitions on an honorary basis, buying two motorised ambulance convoys with his own money and helping form an infantry battalion, being a former captain of the Royal Warwickshires and for some years being the honorary colonel of the 8th battalion of the Royal Warwickshire Regiment.

After the death of Edward VII, Daisy Warwick attempted to blackmail King George V by threatening to release to the press love letters that she claimed proved Edward VII's adultery. When the High Court restrained her from publishing the letters in Britain, she threatened to sell them to American media. In 1914 Du Cros offered to pay £64,000 (equivalent to £6,380,000 in 2025) worth of Daisy's debts in return for the letters, and for his generosity he was created a baronet in 1916. He continued to represent Hastings until 1918, when he was elected as a Member of Parliament for Clapham, a position he resigned four years later.

=== House attacked by suffragettes ===
On 14 April 1913 Levetleigh, a house at St Leonards-on-Sea, close to Hastings, belonging to the Eversfield Estate, which Du Cros had inhabited until March 1912, was burnt down. The perpetrators were suffragettes, including Kitty Marion, angry at his opposition to votes for women. Contemporary newsreels reported the estimated cost of the damage to be £10,000.

== Personal life ==
Du Cros married Maude Gooding, the daughter of a Coventry watch manufacturer in 1895, when he was 24 years old. They had two sons and two daughters. He left Maude in 1917, briefly returned, was caught having an affair, and they divorced in 1922 on the grounds of his adultery and desertion.

In February 1908 he fathered an illegitimate child in Nice by a French woman, Suzanne Arlette. The daughter was named Marjorie. She is not with him or his family in the 1911 or 1921 census. After his 1922 divorce he acknowledged Marjorie openly but seems to have passed her off as his first wife's child. By the late 1920s father and daughter were travelling abroad together, and living with his second wife, Florence. As Marjorie Du Cros, she married Richard Jenks, son of the Lord Mayor of London, in 1932.

Du Cros married Florence May Walton King secretly in Paris in 1928. He was 57 years old and she was 14 years his junior, but they did not announce it until three years later, and then very quietly. Immediately after her death in 1951 he married for the third time, again secretly and abroad. He was 80 years old and his bride, Mary Louise Joan Beaumont, (nee Buhman, b in Hanover in 1889) was 71. The 1939 Register shows that she was his secretary, and lived with him and his second wife.

He wrote a memoir entitled Wheels of Fortune: A Salute to Pioneers, published by Chapman and Hall in 1938.

He died at home near Watford, Hertfordshire on 28 October 1955 aged 84 and was interred in Finstock, Oxfordshire.

Parliament of the United Kingdom
Preceded by Harvey du Cros	Member of Parliament for Hastings; 1908–1918	Succeeded by Laurance Lyon
Preceded by Harry Greer	Member of Parliament for Clapham; 1918–1922	Succeeded by John Leigh
Baronetage of the United Kingdom
New creation	Baronet (of Canons); 1916–1955	Succeeded by Harvey Du Cros
