= Leigh baronets =

Set index of baronetcies

There have been six baronetcies created with the surname of Leigh: two in the Baronetage of England, one in the Baronetage of Ireland, one in the Baronetage of Great Britain and two in the Baronetage of the United Kingdom. The only creation remaining extant is that of Altrincham.

- Leigh Baronets of Stoneleigh (1611): see Baron Leigh
- Leigh Baronets of Newnham (1618): see Earl of Chichester
- Leigh Baronets of Tyrone (1622)
- Leigh Baronets of South Carolina (1773)
- Leigh Baronets of Whitley (1814): see Sir Robert Holt Leigh, 1st Baronet (1762–1843)
- Leigh Baronets of Altrincham (1918)
