= Harry Greer =

British businessman and Conservative politician

Sir Harry Greer (18 September 1876 – 20 March 1947) was a British businessman and Conservative politician.

He was elected Member of Parliament for Clapham in a by-election in 1918. However, in the general election of that year he contested, and won, the constituency of Wells. He held the seat until the next election in 1922. He was knighted in the 1922 New Years Honours List.

Earlier in his career, Greer and his brother William founded the British trading house H. & W. Greer, Ltd. in London in 1904, establishing a Japanese operation, H. & W. Greer (Japan), in Kobe in 1906. In 1909 the firm founded Dunlop Far East, building a Dunlop tyre factory in Kobe. The brothers sold their shareholding to George Millward in 1916, and the company later became Sumitomo Rubber Industries.

Greer later became chairman of the Lord Roberts Memorial Workshops, an organisation set up to create employment for wounded ex-servicemen and named after Field Marshal Lord Roberts. In the 1930s, he joined the board of the Baird Television company, and soon became its chairman. In 1934 his speech to shareholders was delivered by television from Crystal Palace to a meeting in Film House, Wardour Street, London, seven miles away. Until his death he was chairman of the Scottish Machine Tool Corporation.

He married in 1906 and had three daughters.

Parliament of the United Kingdom
Preceded by Denison Faber	Member of Parliament for Clapham; 1918 by-election–1918	Succeeded by Sir Arthur du Cros
Preceded by George John Sandys	Member of Parliament for Wells; 1918–1922	Succeeded by Robert Bruford
