= 1918 Clapham by-election =

UK parliamentary by-election

The 1918 Clapham by-election was a by-election held on 21 June 1918 for the British House of Commons constituency of Clapham in South London.

The by-election was triggered by the elevation to the peerage of the serving Conservative Party Member of Parliament (MP), Denison Faber.

The Unionist (Conservative) candidate was Harry Greer. With the wartime (set to become postwar) coalition in office, there was no other candidate from the major parties. Henry Hamilton Beamish, a writer for the pro-war conspiracy theory penning Vigilance or Vigilante Society, ran as an independent with the support of populist MP Noel Pemberton Billing, whose very prominent libel case of the century of defending various accusations of German blackmail and depravity was a staged exercise in propaganda.

The main issue was ostensibly Beamish's earnest demand for the denaturalization and internment of all citizens of enemy countries in the United Kingdom, the closure of all foreign banks and the wearing of a badge by all foreign aliens. Greer expressed the view that 'stronger measures were necessary' and published a letter from the Prime Minister, who said he was 'determined to take whatever action is shown to be necessary'. The Times reported unexpected support for Beamish in areas that were normally predominantly Conservative. The result was a modest majority for the party from an established party.

== Result ==
Clapham by-election, 1918
Party	Candidate	Votes	%	±%
Conservative	Harry Greer	4,512	57.0	+1.9
Independent	Henry Hamilton Beamish	3,331	43.0	New
Majority		1,181	14.0	
Turnout		7,843	33.3	−42.8
Conservative hold		Swing		

== See also ==
- List of United Kingdom by-elections
- Clapham constituency
