= Harvey du Cros =

British financier and businessman (1846-1918)

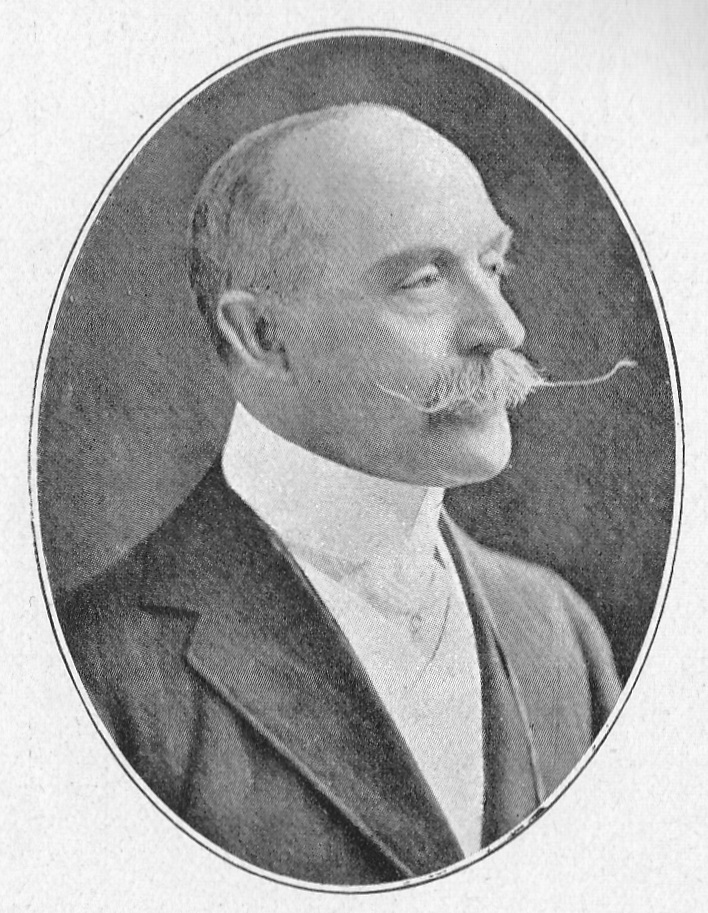

Member of Parliament for Hastings (UK Parliament constituency)
- Preceded by: Freeman Freeman-Thomas
- Succeeded by: Arthur Du Cros

Personal details
- Born: 19 June 1846 Dublin, Ireland
- Died: 21 December 1918 (aged 72)
- Party: Conservative and Unionist Party
- Spouse: Annie Jane Roy
- Education: The King's Hospital

William Harvey du Cros (19 June 1846 – 21 December 1918) was a Dublin-born financier who became the founder of the pneumatic tyre industry by supporting development of the innovations of John Boyd Dunlop and mass-producing Dunlop's tyres. He was briefly a Conservative Party politician in England.

== Early career ==
Son of Edouard Pierre du Cros who was of French Huguenot descent and Maria Molloy he was educated at The King's Hospital, Dublin. He married Annie Jane Roy in 1866 when he was just 20. Advised when aged 30 to take up sport for the sake of his health he made himself Ireland's boxing champion at two weights and Ireland's fencing champion as well as founding and captaining a team which won the Irish Rugby championship. By the time he reached his late-twenties du Cros had formed his six sons into a successful team of racing cyclists, The Invincibles. The team rode on solid tyred penny-farthing bicycles. He was made president of the Irish Cyclists' Association.

== Pneumatic tyre industry ==
Two of his sons were beaten in a cycle race by a little-fancied competitor using John Boyd Dunlop's rudimentary pneumatic tyres. Seeing a commercial opportunity du Cros, now well known in Irish business circles and president of the Irish Cyclists' Association, managed to be invited to form a public listed company to exploit Dunlop's innovations. Friends of du Cros, J. M. Gillies and Dublin cycle agent William Bowden, also persuaded John Boyd Dunlop to join them to promote the new company. With his financial expertise, du Cros successfully floated the company's shares keeping all arrangements under his own control.

In 1896, du Cros sold that company to a group of people including Ernest T. Hooley for 3 million pounds. The business was then refloated to the public as Dunlop Pneumatic Tyre Company in May 1896. Dunlop Pneumatic Tyre Company produced its first car tyre in 1900, considerably after Michelin. Later it began to diversify into aircraft tyres and golf balls.

Du Cros helped finance the British army's first airship and organised the first motorized movement of British troops.

== Sons ==
Within a month of the foundation of the business his sons were recruited to be scattered to the four corners of the globe. They quartered the globe going wherever a cycle business existed.

1= Frederick Hilary du Cros (1868–1917) twin eldest son France
1= Alfred James du Cros (1868–1946) twin North and South America
3. Arthur Philip du Cros (1871–1955) England
4. Harvey du Cros junior (1872–1928) see below North and South America
5. William Ernest du Cros (1874–1937) Belgium
6. George Herbert du Cros (1875–1946) Canada. Made the American continent's first pneumatic tyre in Chicago aged 16 in 1891.

== Parliament ==
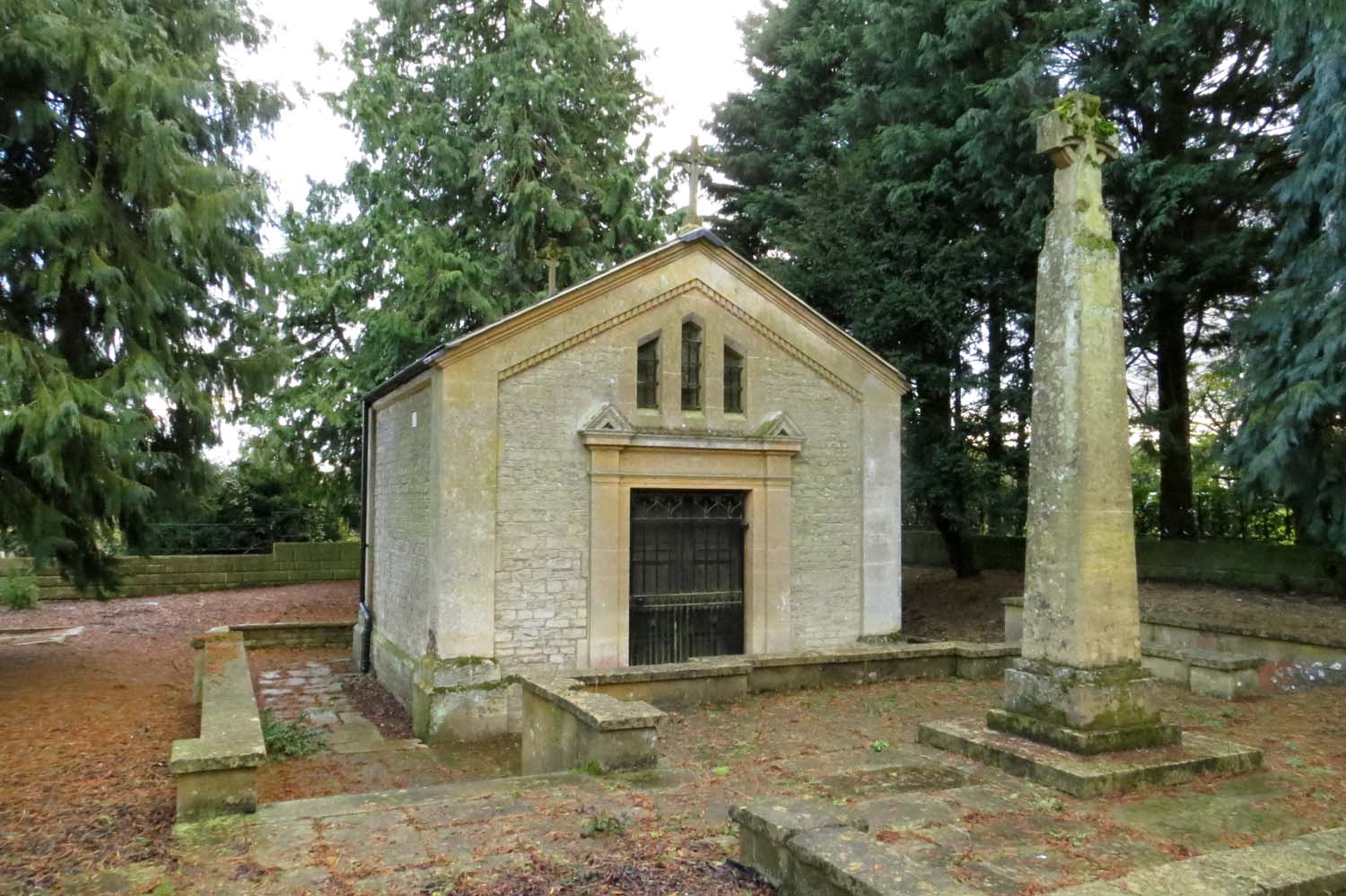
The du Cros family vault in Finstock churchyard

He was elected in the 1906 general election as Member of Parliament for Hastings in East Sussex. He resigned from the House of Commons two years later because of ill health, by the procedural device of accepting the post of Steward of the Chiltern Hundreds. The resulting Hastings by-election of 3 March 1908 was won for the Conservatives by du Cros's son Arthur, later Sir Arthur du Cros, 1st Baronet du Cros.

William Harvey du Cros died at his house Inniscorrig Dalkey county Dublin on 21 December 1918 and was buried in a family vault at Finstock Oxfordshire.

== Harvey du Cros junior 1872–1928 ==
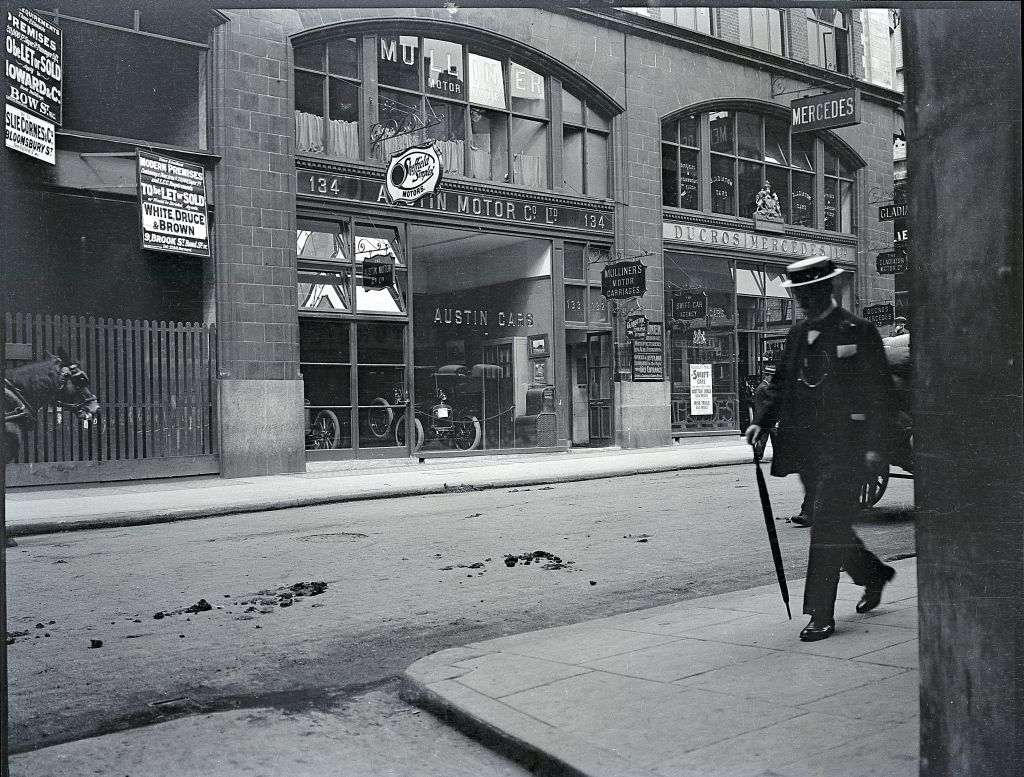
130–134 Long Acre London showing clockwise Austin Motor Co, Mulliner Motor Carriages, Gladiator Cars, Du Cros Mercedes, Swift cars c. 1910

Born in Dublin 15 March 1872 the son of Harvey du Cros (above) and his wife Annie Jane Roy he was one of six sons. His father sent him from England to America in 1892, still aged 19, to found a pneumatic tyre business there but he was unable to sign the necessary deeds until his 21st birthday. He formed a long enduring link with what became the Goodyear Tire and Rubber Company. He later left his father's Dunlop business founding the Swift Motor Company and the Yellow Cab Company. He was also the importer of Mercedes motorcars to Britain beginning when few cars were made in Britain. With Frank Kayser of Kayser Ellison Steel a major backer of Herbert Austin when Austin formed his own business he was deputy chairman of the Austin Motor Company and held many other directorships. He died 1 November 1928 in Longwood Maidenhead and was interred at Finstock Oxfordshire.

Du Cros co-owned the Motor Power Company with S. F. Edge and they imported the French Clement-Gladiator cars, often known as Gladiators, into the UK.

Parliament of the United Kingdom
Preceded by Freeman Freeman-Thomas	Member of Parliament for Hastings; 1906 – 1908	Succeeded by Arthur du Cros
