= Leigh Baronets of Tyrone (1622) =

The Leigh Baronetcy, of Tyrone, was created in the Baronetage of Ireland in February 1622 for Sir Daniel Leigh. The title became extinct on the death of his son Sir Arthur Leigh, 2nd Baronet in 1638.

== Leigh baronets, of Tyrone (1622) ==
- Sir Daniel Leigh, 1st Baronet, High Sheriff of Tyrone (died 1633)
- Sir Arthur Leigh, 2nd Baronet (died 1638).

== Notes ==
Baronetage of Ireland
| Preceded by Aylmer baronets | Leigh baronets of Tyrone; 16 February 1622 | Succeeded by Gore baronets |
