= Levin (surname) =

Levin is a common Ashkenazi Jewish surname derived from the tribe of Levi, whose descendants the Levites had distinctive duties in the Temple period.

It may also be a transliteration without diacritics of the Russian surname Лёвин (Lyovin).

People with the name "Levin" (and East Slavic feminine variant Levina) include:

== People ==
=== A–I ===
- A. Leo Levin (1919–2015), American law professor at the University of Pennsylvania Law School
- Adam K. Levin, former director of the New Jersey Division of Consumer Affairs and businessman in consumer credit-related businesses
- Adam Levin, fiction author
- Alan Levin (business), American businessmen, CFO of drug maker Pfizer
- Alan Levin (filmmaker) (1926–2006), American filmmaker and journalist
- Alan Levin (Internet governance), South African computer scientist and Internet activist
- Aleksandr Mitrofanovich Levin (1871–1929), Russian chess player
- Alter Levin (1883–1933), Hebrew writer and poet
- Andy Levin (born 1960), US Democratic Representative from Michigan; son of Sander and nephew of Carl
- Arnold Levin, New Yorker cartoonist
- Aubrey Levin, psychiatrist and head of The Aversion Project
- Bengt Levin (1958–2020), Swedish orienteering competitor
- Benjamin Levin (born 1988), American record producer and songwriter known professionally as Benny Blanco
- Bernard Levin, (1928–2004), British writer and broadcaster
- Beth Levin (linguist), American linguist
- Beth Levin (musician), American pianist
- Bobby Levin, American bridge player
- Burton Levin (1930–2016), American diplomat, former Ambassador to Burma
- Camille Levin (born 1990), American soccer player
- Carl Levin (1934–2021), US Democratic Senator from Michigan; brother of Sander Levin, cousin of Charles Levin and uncle of Andy Levin
- Charles Levin (actor) (1949–2019), American actor
- Charles Levin (judge) (1926–2020), American jurist; cousin of Carl and Sander Levin
- Corey Levin (born 1994), American football player
- Daniel Levin (attorney) (active 2004–2005), Acting Assistant Attorney General for the Office of Legal Counsel of the U.S. Justice Department
- Daniel Levin (writer) (born c. 1980), American attorney and novelist
- David L. Levin (born 1949), American politician from Missouri
- David Levin (businessman) (born 1962), British businessman
- David Levin (born 1999), Israeli ice hockey player
- David Levin (singer), American singer-songwriter
- David N. Levin (1948–2017), American balloonist
- David P. Levin (born 1958), American producer, director, writer and editor
- Diane Levin (born 1947), American author and educator
- Diane Levin, American author and educator
- Douglas Levin, American businessman
- Elinor Levin (born 1987), American politician
- Eyal Levin (born 1986), Israeli Olympic sailor
- Ezra G. Levin, American lawyer
- Fred Levin (1937–2021), American lawyer
- Gabe Levin (born 1994), American-Israeli basketball player in the Israeli Basketball Premier League
- Gerald M. Levin (1939–2024), American businessman with Time Warner
- Gilbert Levin, American engineer
- Hanoch Levin (1943–1999), Israeli writer and theater director
- Harold Levin, American violist, composer, and conductor
- Harry Levin (1912–1994), American literary critic
- Harvey Levin, TV and movie producer
- Helen Phillips Levin, (1924–1985) disability rights activist and philanthropist
- Hjördis Levin (born 1930), Swedish historian and author
- Ingeborg Levin, German geoscientist and climatologist
- Ira Levin (1929–2007), American novelist, playwright and songwriter

=== J–Z ===
- Jack Levin, professor at Northeastern University and sociologist
- Janice H. Levin (1913–2001), American philanthropist and art collector from New York City
- Janna Levin, theoretical cosmologist
- Jennifer Levin (1968–1986), murder victim in New York City's Central Park
- Jill Levin (born 1961), American bridge player
- Joe Levin, American lawyer
- Jon Levin (born 1966), physicist (incorrect?)
- Jonathan Levin (economist) (born 1972), American economist and academic
- Jonathan Levin (footballer), Mexican footballer
- Jonathan Levin (teacher) (1966–1997), American murder victim
- Josef Lhévinne (1874–1944), Russian pianist
- Kenneth Levin (born 1944), American psychiatrist and author
- Leonid Levin (born 1948), Russian-born computer scientist
- Lev Levin (1870–1938) Physician, born Odessa, executed during Stalin's purges
- Lewis Charles Levin (1808–1860), first Jewish Representative to the U.S. Congress
- Lori Levin, American computer scientist and computational linguist
- Maks Levin (1981–2022), Ukrainian photojournalist killed in the 2022 Russian invasion of Ukraine
- Marc Levin, Jewish American filmmaker
- Mark Levin (director) (born 1966), American director and screenwriter
- Mark Levin (born 1957), American conservative radio host, lawyer, author, and political commentator who served in the Reagan administration
- Meyer Levin (1905–1981), U.S. novelist
- Michael Levin (philosopher) (born 1943), professor of philosophy at the City University of New York
- Michael Levin (biologist) (born 1969), professor of biology at Tufts University
- Mike Levin (born 1978), US Democratic Representative from California
- Murray Levin (1927–1999), political science professor at Boston University
- Nathaniel Levin (1818–1903), New Zealand businessman and politician
- Neil David Levin (1954–2001), former executive director of the Port Authority of New York and New Jersey who was killed in the September 11 attacks
- Nora Levin (1916–1989), American Holocaust historian
- Petra Levin, American microbiologist
- Philip J. Levin (c. 1909–1971), American real estate developer and investor
- Rick Levin (born 1947), American economist, president of Yale University
- Rob Levin (1955–2006), founder of the freenode IRC network
- Robert D. Levin (born 1947), U.S. composer and musicologist
- Robert Levin (Norwegian pianist) (1912–1996), Norwegian pianist and composer
- Robert Levin (writer) (born 1939), American fiction writer
- Sander M. Levin (born 1931), US Democratic Representative from Michigan; brother of Carl, cousin of Charles and father of Andy
- Savannah Levin (born 1995), American soccer player
- Simon A. Levin, theoretical ecologist, professor of biology at Princeton University
- Sofia Levin, Australian food journalist
- Susan Bass Levin, New Jersey, US politician
- Tatyana Levina (born 1977), Russian sprinter
- Theodore Levin (1897–1970), U.S. federal jurist
- Tony Levin (born 1946), U.S. bass player
- Vladimir Levin (hacker), Russian mathematician and alleged criminal hacker
- Vladimir Levin (historian), Israeli historian
- Walter Levin (1924–2017), German-born violinist, founder member of the LaSalle Quartet
- William Levin (1845–1893), New Zealand businessman and politician
- Yariv Levin (born 1969), Israeli MK and Deputy Prime Minister
- Yuval Levin, member of White House domestic policy staff
- Zara Levina (1906–1976), Ukrainian composer

== Fictional characters ==
- Kevin Levin, protagonist/antagonist from the television series Ben 10"
- Konstantin Levin, a protagonist in Tolstoy's novel Anna Karenina
- Patti Levin, character in The Leftovers
- Jack Levin, a character in the racing video game series F-Zero

== See also ==
- Lavine
- Levene
- Levi
- Levi (surname)
- Levin (given name)
- Levina
- Levine
- Lewin
- Lieven
- Lewinsky
