= Levine =

Levine (French transliteration from Russian) / Levin (English transliteration from Russian Левин) is a common Ashkenazi Jewish surname derived from the Hebrew name Levi. Levinsky is a variation with the same meaning.

People with the name Levine or LeVine include:

== People ==
=== In arts and media ===
==== In film, television, and theatre ====
- Alice Levine (born 1986), British television and radio presenter
- Chloe Levine, American actress
- Floyd Levine, American film and television actor
- Joseph E. Levine, American film producer
- Kate Levine, American voice actor
- Ken Levine (TV personality), American television and film writer and baseball announcer
- Kristine Levine, American actress and stand-up comedian
- Naomi Levine, American actor
- Rhoda Levine (1932–2026), American opera director and choreographer
- Samm Levine (b. 1982), American television and film actor
- Ted Levine (b. 1957), American actor

==== In literature and journalism ====
- Allan Levine (born 1956), Canadian writer
- David Levine (1926–2009), American artist and illustrator
- David D. Levine (born 1961), American science fiction writer
- Gail Carson Levine (born 1947), American author of young adult books
- Irving R. Levine (1922–2009), American journalist
- Jeffrey Levine (poet), American poet, publisher, musician, and attorney
- Judith Levine (born 1952), American political writer and civil libertarian
- Ketzel Levine, American radio journalist
- Mark Levine (journalist) (born 1966), delegate in the Virginia State House of Delegates and American liberal radio host
- Mark Levine (poet) (born 1965), American poet
- Noah Levine (born 1971), writer; son of author Stephen Levine
- Norman Levine (1923–2005), Canadian short story writer
- Paul Levine (born 1948), American novelist and lawyer
- Philip Levine (poet) (1928–2015), American populist poet, professor of English and Poet Laureate of the United States
- Stephen Levine (author) (1937–2016), American poet and author
- Yasha Levine (born 1981), Russian-American journalist

==== In music ====
- Adam Levine (born 1979), American singer, songwriter, multi-instrumentalist, actor, and television personality
- Baruch Levine (born 1977), American Orthodox Jewish singer-composer
- Elliot Levine, (born 1963), American jazz pianist
- Gilbert Levine (born 1948), American conductor
- Ian Levine (born 1953), British songwriter, producer, and DJ
- James Levine (1943–2021), American orchestral conductor and pianist
- James S. Levine, American composer
- Jeffrey Levine (poet), American poet, publisher, musician, and attorney
- Joey Levine, American songwriter, music producer and performer
- Mark Levine (musician) (1938–2022), American jazz musician
- Mark LeVine, American history professor and musician
- Michael A. Levine, Los Angeles-based composer
- Mike Levine (musician), Canadian bassist and keyboardist
- Ryan Levine (musician) American musician, lead singer of band Wildling
- Stewart Levine, American record producer

==== In other media ====
- David Levine (photographer) (born 1960), British photographer
- Esther Levine (born 1970), German-born, New York-based photographer
- Herbert Levine (fashion executive), American fashion designer
- Jack Levine (1915–2010), American expressionist painter
- Janet Levine (1963–1996), American illustrator and murder victim
- Ken Levine (video game designer), American computer game designer
- Marilyn Levine (1935–2005), Canadian ceramics artist
- Philip Levine (entrepreneur), British entrepreneur, trendsetter and artist
- Sherrie Levine (b. 1947), American photographer

=== In business ===
- David Levine (executive), Canadian music and television executive
- Dennis Levine (born 1953), American stock trader sentenced for perjury and securities fraud
- Earl Levine, American computer businessman
- Leon Levine (1938–2023), American retailer
- Marne Levine (born 1971/72), American businesswoman
- Philip Levine (entrepreneur), British entrepreneur, trendsetter and artist
- Randy Levine, American president of New York Yankees

=== In government, law, and politics ===
- Adam Levine (press aide), American political adviser and former Bush administration aide
- Beryl J. Levine (1935–2022), American judge
- Daniella Levine Cava (born 1955), American lawyer, social worker and politician, Mayor of Miami-Dade County since 2020
- David Levine (politician) (1883–1972), American politician
- Eugen Leviné (1883–1919), German revolutionary leader of the Bavarian Soviet Republic
- J. Sidney Levine (died 1955), New York politician
- Jeffrey D. Levine, United States Ambassador to Estonia
- Judith Levine (born 1952), American political writer and civil libertarian
- Mark Levine (journalist) (born 1966), delegate in the Virginia State House of Delegates and American liberal radio host
- Mark D. Levine (born 1969), New York City council member
- Max S. Levine (1881–1933), American lawyer, politician and judge
- Michael E. Levine, American lawyer
- Paul Levine (born 1948), American novelist and lawyer
- Philip Levine (politician), mayor of Miami Beach, Florida

=== In science and academia ===
==== In biology, medicine, and psychology ====
- Arnold J. Levine (b. 1939), American virologist and molecular biologist
- Bruce E. Levine, American psychologist
- Bruce R. Levin, American evolutionary biologist
- David F. Levine (b. 1965), American author, professor, and biomedical scientist
- Lena ("Lee") Levine (1903–1965), American psychiatrist and gynecologist
- Madeline Levine, American psychologist
- Peter G. Levine, (b. 1960) American stroke researcher and educator
- Philip Levine (physician) (1900–1987), Russian-born American immuno-hematologist; researched blood groups
- Rachel Levine (born 1957), American pediatrician, Pennsylvania Secretary of Health since 2017
- Robert V. Levine (1945–2019), American psychologist
- Samuel A. Levine (1891–1966), American cardiologist
- Stephen B. Levine (b. 1942), American psychiatrist
- Eric S. Levine (b. 1964), American neuroscientist

==== In other academic fields ====
- Amy-Jill Levine, New Testament scholar
- David K. Levine (born c.1955), American economist and game theorist
- Dov Levine (born 1958), American-Israeli physicist
- Ira N. Levine (1937–2015), American chemistry professor, Brooklyn College
- Jerome Paul Levine (1937–2006), American mathematician
- Joel S. Levine (born 1942), American planetary and atmospheric scientist
- John R. Levine, American internet consultant
- Joseph Levine (philosopher), American philosopher
- Marc Levine, American mathematician
- Mark LeVine, American history professor and musician
- Phillip Levine (b. 1963), American economist
- Raphael David Levine (b. 1938), Israeli chemist
- Robert M. Levine (1941–2003), American historian
- Ross Levine (b. 1960), American economist
- Suzanne Jill Levine, American translator and academic

=== In sport ===
- Al Levine, American major league baseball relief pitcher
- Alison Levine (boccia), Canadian Paralympic boccia player
- Artie Levine, American middleweight and light heavyweight boxer
- Darren Levine, American martial artist
- David Levine (racing driver) (born 1993), American racing driver
- Jesse Levine (born 1987), US/Canadian tennis player
- Jon Levine (born 1963), American tennis player
- Nir Levine (born 1962), Israeli footballer and football manager
- Tony Levine (born 1972), American football coach

=== In other fields ===
- Samuel Levine (mobster)
- Scott Levine, computer criminal
- William P. Levine (1915–2013), United States Army major general and Holocaust speaker
- Charles A. Levine (1897–1991), first passenger to cross the Atlantic by airplane

== See also ==
- Arthur A. Levine Books, an American publisher owned by Scholastic
- Lavine
- Levene
- Levi (disambiguation)
- Levin (disambiguation)
- Levy
- Lewin (disambiguation)
- Lieven
- Justice Levine (disambiguation)
