= Leven =

Leven may refer to:

== People ==
- Leven (name), list of people with the name

=== Nobility ===
- Earl of Leven a title in the Peerage of Scotland

== Placenames ==
- Leven, Fife, a town in Scotland
- Leven, East Riding of Yorkshire, a village in England
- Leven station (disambiguation)
- Loch Leven (disambiguation), several lakes of that name
- River Leven (disambiguation), several rivers of that name
- Municipality of Leven, former Local Government Authority in Tasmania. Now part of Central Coast Council.

== Ships ==
- SS Leven, an Australian hopper ship in service 1966-88

== See also ==
- Levens (disambiguation)
- Levin (disambiguation)
- Leaven
