= Alan Levin =

Alan Levin may refer to:

- Alan Levin (business), former CFO of Pfizer
- Alan Levin (filmmaker), filmmaker
- Alan Levin (internet governance), policy, research and development specialist involved in global Internet Governance
- Alan Levin (radio) (known on-air as Brother Wease), American radio personality

== See also ==
- Al Levine, baseball player
- Allan Levine, Canadian author
