= Ido Noy =

Curator and historian of Jewish art and ephemera

Dr. Ido Noy

Dr. Ido Noy (Hebrew: עידו נוי; born 26 March 1979) is a designer, curator and historian of jewelry and fashion, Jewish art, folklore, popular art and ephemera.

== Early life and education ==
Ido Noy was born in Kfar Vradim, a village in Northern Israel. He currently lives in Jerusalem, with his wife Maya and their two children.

He attended the Bezalel Academy of Art and Design, where he earned his Bachelor of Fine Arts in 2006 in the Department for Jewelry and Fashion, followed by a Master of Arts in 2012 from Hebrew University with a thesis, “Head Decoration Representations on Ancient Jewish Coins” (Hebrew). In 2018 Noy earned his Ph.D. from Hebrew University focusing on medieval Jewish art. His doctoral thesis was, “Medieval Ashkenazi Wedding Jewelry and Love Tokens: Christian Material Culture in Jewish Context (Hebrew). During his doctoral studies, Noy was a member of the Ph.D. Honors Program at the Jack, Joseph & Morton Mandel School for Advanced Studies in the Humanities. Between 2019 and 2022 Noy was working on his post-doctorate at Hebrew University as part of the European Research Council (ERC) fellowship “Beyond the Elite: Jewish Daily Life in Medieval Europe."

== Career ==
Between 2013 and 2017, Noy was a member of the Center for Jewish Art at The Hebrew University of Jerusalem where he directed the Department of Documentation of Ancient Art and Judaica and ritual objects. In addition, Noy founded and directed an additional department entitled Bezalel School.

Noy is a curator, specifically for Contemporary Judaica exhibitions and the Bezalel School of Judaica. He has curated exhibits for a variety of different institutions including The Association of Israelis of Central European Origin, The Jerusalem Biennale, Rishon LeZion Museum, and The Museum for Islamic Art, Skirball Museum of Biblical Archaeology, The Worldwide North Africa Jewish Heritage Center, The Old Synagogue in Erfurt, Galerie Waidspeicher (Erfurt), The Berend Lehmann Museum and The Kalus Synagogue in Halberstadt, Tisch gallery (JCC Manhattan, NYC), German Consulate Gallery, Manhattan (NYC), The Wolfson Museum at Hechal Shlomo, he Cymbalista Jewish Heritage Center, Tel Aviv University, Max and Iris Stern Gallery at the Hebrew University of Jerusalem.

Between 2019 and 2024 Noy was the Deputy Director and Director of Content for the 4th Jerusalem Biennale, the director of operations of Musrara School of Art and Society, and the director of c.a.t.a.m.o.n dance group in Jerusalem. Noy currently teaches in the Department of History and Philosophy of Art, Design, and Technology at Shenkar – Engineering. Design. Art., as well as at the School of Architecture at Ariel University.

== List of publications ==
- Ido Noy (ed.), De Profundis: Catalog of the 7th edition of the Jerusalem Biennale, Jerusalem 2026 (English and Hebrew).
- Ido Noy, "Beyond Kiddushin: The Medieval Ashkenazi Betrothal Ring," in: E. Baumgarten (ed.), Beyond the Elite: Everyday Jewish Lives in Medieval Northern Europe (Cornell University Press, 2026), pp. 226-254.
- Ido Noy, “We Hate the Holidays: Garbage Pail Kids and H̱avurat HaZevel as a Platform for Cultural Exchange,” in: Shalom Sabar and Rina Talgam (eds.), Welcoming Visuality: New Studies in Jewish Art and Material Culture, (Brill, 2026), pp. 447-474.
- Ido Noy, Disgrace to the White House: Garbage Pail Kids as a Platform for Political Satire, Black Edition (Jerusalem: Self publishing, 2024).
- Ido Noy, Disgrace to the White House: Garbage Pail Kids as a Platform for Political Satire (Jerusalem: Self publishing, 2025).
- Ido Noy, "Disgrace to the Knesset: On Garbage Pail Kids, Caricature and Political Satire in Israel," Israeli Journal of Humor Research 12/2 (September 2024): 61-109.
- Ido Noy, “Medieval Ashkenaz: Views from the 21st Century,” Jewish Studies Quarterly (2021), 429-466.
- Ido Noy “Garbage Pail Kids: On Caricature, Satire and Political Stench,” Jerusalem Studies in Jewish Folklore 34 (2022), 211-252. (Hebrew).
- Elisheva Baumgarten and Ido Noy (eds.), In and Out, Between and Beyond: Jewish Daily Life in Medieval Europe (Jerusalem: Hebrew University, 2021).
- Ido Noy, “Amor Vincit Omnia: Medieval Jewish Love and Romance in Light of the Erfurt Girdle,” in: Maria Stürzebecher and Claudia Bergmann (eds.) Erfurter Schriften zur jüdischen Geschichte Vol 6: Ritual Objects in Ritual Contexts, (Erfurt: Landeshauptstadt Erfurt, 2020), 80-93.
- Ido Noy and Shirat Miriam Shamir, Rash Rash Rash: Contemporary Noisemakers of the Bezalel School (Tel Aviv: The Cymbalista Synagogue and Jewish Heritage Center at the Tel Aviv University, 2020).
- Ido Noy (ed.), For Heaven's Sake: Catalog of the 4th edition of the Jerusalem Biennale, Jerusalem 2020 (English and Hebrew).
- Ido Noy, "The Fleuron Crown of Mrs. Zemah Daughter of Rabbi Aaron: Concepts of Royalty, Nobility and Virginity among Ashkenazi brides in the late Middle Ages," Chidushim, Studies in the History of German and Central European Jewry, vol.12 (2019), pp.83-112.
- Ido Noy, "Love Conquers All: The Erfurt Girdle as a Source for Understanding Medieval Jewish Love and Romance," Images 11 (2018), pp. 227–246.
- Ido Noy and Shirat Miriam Shamir, Israel Dahan: Fifty Years of Judaica (Jerusalem: The Jerusalem Biennale, 2019).
- Ido Noy and Shirat-Miriam Shamir (editors), Khamsa Khamsa Khamsa: The Evolution of a Motif in Contemporary Israeli Art, Museum for Islamic Art (Exhibition Catalogue), Jerusalem 2018 (English, Hebrew and Arabic).
- Ido Noy and Shirat-Miriam Shamir (editors), Keep It Light: Memorial Candle of Bezalel School, Part of the 3rd Jerusalem Biennale for Contemporary Jewish Art (Exhibition Catalogue), Jerusalem 2017 (English and Hebrew).
- Ido Noy, Yonah Shapira and Shirat-Miriam Shamir (editors), Hallel, Carmel, Bezalel, Rishon Le-Zion Museum (Exhibition Catalogue), Tel Aviv 2016. (English and Hebrew).
- Ido Noy, "The Fleuron Crown from Neumarkt in Silesia (Środa Śląska): Christian Material Culture in Jewish Context," Ars Judaica 12 (2016), pp. 23–38.
- Ido Noy and Shamir Shirat-Miriam, Bezalel: In and Out in Jewish Contemporary Art, Part of The Second Jerusalem Biennale for Contemporary Jewish Art (Exhibition Catalogue), Jerusalem 2015 (English and Hebrew).
- Ido Noy, "Head Decoration Representations on Hasmonean and Herodian Coins," Israel Numismatic Research, Vol.8 (2013), pp. 38–53.
- Ido Noy, "The Victory Wreath of Hyrcanus I," Israel Numismatic Research, Vol.7 (2012), pp. 31–42.
