= Lewin =

Lewin is a Germanic name, usually originating from either of two different sources, the Old English Leofwine or a variant of the Jewish Levin. People with the name include:

- Albert Lewin (1894–1968), American film director, producer, and screenwriter
- Benjamin Lewin, founder of the Cell journal
- Bernard Lewin (1906–2003), German-born American collector of Mexican art
- Blanca Lewin, Chilean television and film actress
- Daniel M. Lewin, co-founder of Akamai Technologies, and victim of the September 11 attacks.
- David Lewin (1933–2003), American music theorist and composer
- Derek Lewin (1930–2019), English amateur international footballer
- Frank Lewin (1925–2008), American composer and teacher
- Gary Lewin (born 1964), British football physiotherapist
- Gordon Lewin (fr) (1921–2008), British clarinetist, saxophonist and composer
- Herbert G. Lewin (1914–2010), American politician
- Hugh Lewin (1939–2019), South African anti-apartheid activist and writer
- Jack Lewin (1915–1990), New Zealand public servant and trade unionist
- James Lewin (1887–1937), German physician and psychiatrist
- John Lewin (1770–1819), English-born artist, first professional artist of the colony of New South Wales
- Jonathan S. Lewin, American neuroradiologist
- Josh Lewin, American sports commentator
- Kurt Lewin (1890–1947), German psychologist
- Louis Lewin, German pharmacologist
- Mark Lewin, American professional wrestler
- Míriam Lewin, Argentine journalist and writer
- Moshe Lewin (1921–2010), historian of Russia
- Nathan Lewin, American attorney
- Nora Lewin, fictional District Attorney appearing in the Law & Order franchise
- Paula Lewin (born 1971), Bermudian sailor
- Ralph A. Lewin (1921–2008), American biologist known as "the father of green algae genetics"
- Robert Lewin (screenwriter) (1920–2004), motion picture-TV writer-producer-director
- Robert Lewin (art dealer) (1918–2004), Polish-born British art dealer and philanthropist
- Roger Lewin, anthropologist and science writer
- Ruthe Lewin Winegarten (1930–2004), American author, activist, and historian
- Stephen Lewin (19th century), English builder of steamboats and steam locomotives
- Terence Lewin, Admiral of the Fleet in the Royal Navy
- Walter Lewin, nuclear physicist
- William Lewin (1747–1795), English naturalist and illustrator
- Lewin Nyatanga, Welsh footballer

== See also ==
- Dominic Calvert-Lewin (born 1997), English footballer
- Lewin, Hakkari, a historical Assyrian tribe in Hakkari, Turkey
- Levin (disambiguation)
- Levine
