= Vladimir Levin =

Vladimir Levin may refer to:

- Vladimir Levin (hacker) (born 1967), Russian hacker of Citibank
- Vladimir Levin (historian) (born 1971), Israeli historian
- Volodimir Levin (born 1984), Azerbaijani and Ukrainian football player
