= Levin =

Levin may refer to:

- Levin (given name)
- Levin (surname)
- Levín, a market town in the Czech Republic
- Levin, New Zealand, a town in southern North Island
- Toyota Corolla Levin, an automobile
- Levin (guitar company), Sweden
- Konstantin Dmitrievitch Levin, a character in Tolstoy's Anna Karenina
- Lewyn, a playable character in Fire Emblem: Genealogy of the Holy War, named Levin in Japan
- Ira Levin, playwright and novelist

== See also ==
- Leven (disambiguation)
- Levine
- Levinz, a surname
- Anatol Lieven
- Lieven
- Elia Levita
