= Aliza Cohen-Mushlin =

Israeli art historian

- עליזה כהן-מושלין
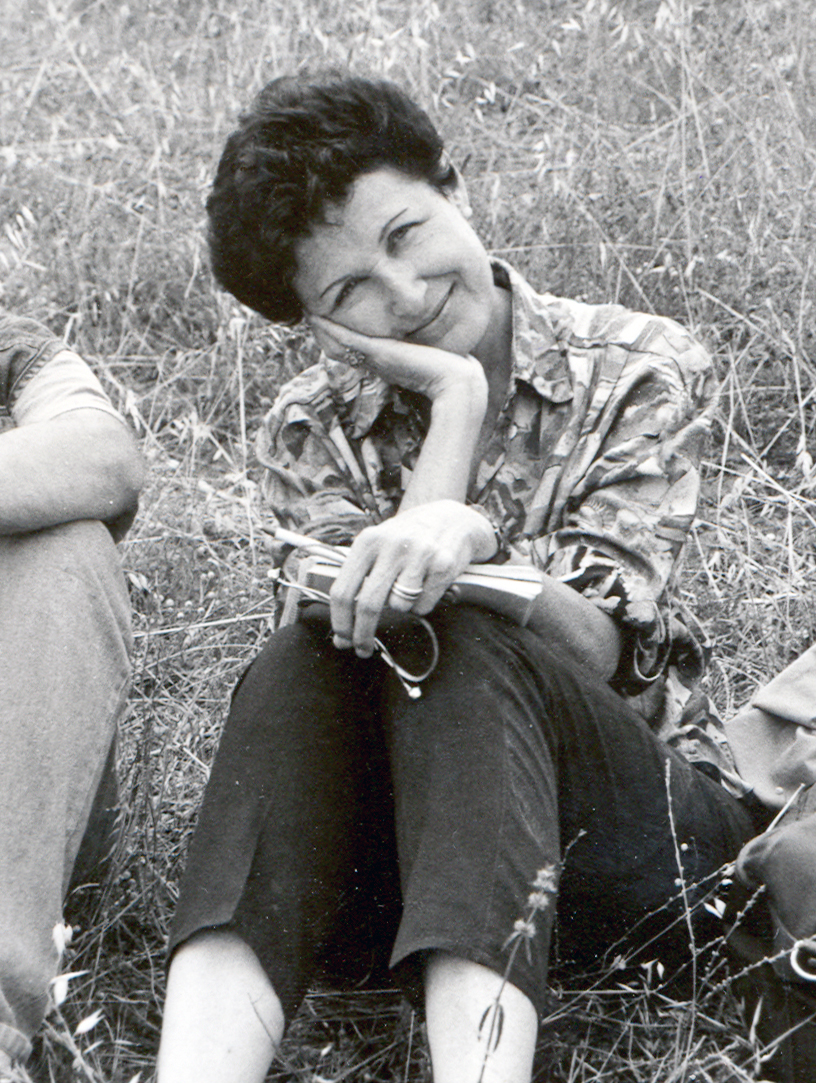
- Aliza Cohen-Mushlin
- Born: 8.4.1937; Rechovot, Israel
- Occupations: Art Historian, Academic, Author

Academic background
- Education: Hebrew University of Jerusalem, Warburg Institute

Academic work
- Discipline: Latin and Hebrew manuscripts, Jewish architecture
- Institutions: Hebrew University, Center for Jewish Art

Aliza Cohen-Mushlin (Hebrew: עליזה כהן-מושלין; born 8 April 1937) is an Israeli art historian, a specialist in medieval Latin and Hebrew manuscripts and Jewish architecture, an author of important researches on the medieval scriptorium.

== Biography ==
Aliza Cohen-Mushlin was born in Rehovot. She studied biology (B.Sc.) and Art History (M.A.) in the Hebrew University of Jerusalem and harpsichord and organ in the Rubin Music Academy (B.Mus.). She earned her Ph.D. in art history in 1981 from the Warburg Institute, London University.

== Academic career ==
Cohen-Mushlin taught in the Art History Department of the Hebrew University of Jerusalem from 1981 and retired in 2006 as associate professor. In 1986-2006 she was the editor of Jewish Art (formerly Journal of Jewish Art).

Cohen-Mushlin was director of the Center for Jewish Art in 1991–2006, where founded the Section for Jewish Architecture and headed it in 1992–2006. Cohen-Mushlin led numerous field expeditions to document endangered Jewish art and architecture.

In 1994, Cohen-Mushlin together with Prof. Harmen Thies founded Bet Tfila Research Unit for Jewish Architecture in Technische Universität Braunschweig.

In 2009, Cohen-Mushlin was granted Cross of Merit of the Order of Merit of the Federal Republic of Germany by the President of the Republic of Germany for groundbreaking research of Latin and Hebrew manuscripts in Germany, for life achievements in the preservation of Jewish Art and for establishing of 'Bet Tfila' Research Unit for Jewish Architecture.

== Published books ==
- Hebrew Illuminated Manuscripts in the British Isles, vol. I, Spanish and Portuguese Manuscripts, by Bezalel Narkiss, Aliza Cohen-Mushlin and Anat Tcherikover, the Israel and British Academies, Oxford University Press, 1982.
- Aliza Cohen-Mushlin, The Making of a Manuscript, The Worms Bible of 1148 (Wolfenbütteler Forschungen, vol. 25), Harrassowitz, Wiesbaden, 1983. ISBN 978-3-447-02419-8
- The Kennicott Bible, introductory volume to a facsimile edition, by Bezalel Narkiss and Aliza Cohen-Mushlin, Facsimile Editions, London, 1985.
- The Worms Mahzor, introductory volume to a facsimile edition, by Malachi Beit-Arie, Bezalel Narkiss, Aliza Cohen-Mushlin, E. Fleischer, J. Eldar J. Allerhand, O. Wachter, Chone Schmeruk, Cyelar Publishing Co., London, and Jewish National and University Library, Jerusalem, 1986.
- Aliza Cohen-Mushlin, A Medieval Scriptorium, Sancta Maria Magdalena de Frankendal (Wolfenbütteler Mittelalter-Studien 3), Harrassowitz, Wiesbaden, 1990, 2 vols. ISBN 978-3-447-03106-6
- Aliza Cohen-Mushlin, Scriptoria in Medieval Saxony: St. Pancras in Hamersleben, Harrassowitz, Wiesbaden, 2004. ISBN 978-3-447-04622-0
- Aliza Cohen-Mushlin, Sergey Kravtsov, Vladimir Levin, Giedrė Mickūnaitė and Jurgita Šiaučiūnaitė-Verbickienė (eds.), Synagogues in Lithuania: A Catalogue. 2 vols. Vilnius: Vilnius Academy of Art Press, 2010–2012. ISBN 978-9-955-85460-9, 978-6-094-47004-2
- Aliza Cohen-Mushlin, Selected Hebrew Manuscripts from the Bavarian State Library, in collaboration with Yaffa Levy, Michal Sternthal, Ilona Steimann, Anna Nizza-Caplan and Estherlee Kanon-Ebner, Harrassowitz, Wiesbaden, 2020. ISBN 978-3-447-11421-9
