= P. Levine =

P. Levine may refer to:

- Paul Levine
- Peter G. Levine
- Philip Levine (disambiguation)
