= Lewinski =

Lewinski (Polish: Lewiński) is a Jewish surname of Polish origin. Notable people with the surname include:

- Ed Lewinski (1918–1962), American professional basketball player
- Eduard von Lewinski (1829–1906), Prussian general
- Erich von Manstein genannt von Lewinski (1887–1973), German field marshal in the Second World War
- Jan Lewiński (1851–1919), architect
- Jorge Lewinski (1921–2008), Polish-British photographer and soldier
- Thomas Lewinski (c. 1800–1882), American architect
- William Lewinski (born 1940s), Canadian-born police psychologist
- Wolf-Eberhard von Lewinski (1927–2003), German music and theatre critic

== See also ==
- Levinsky
- Lewinsky (surname)
