= Leven (name) =

Leven is both a unisex given name and a surname. People with the name include:

== Given name ==
- Leven Cooper Allen (1894–1979), American army officer
- Leven H. Ellis (1881–1968), American politician
- Leven Kali, Dutch singer
- Leven Powell (1737–1810), American army officer and politician
- Leven Rambin, American actress

== Surname ==
- Andrew Baxter Leven (1885–1966), Scottish-born Australian architect
- Boris Leven (1908–1986), Russian-born American art director
- Jackie Leven (1950–2011), Scottish singer and songwriter
- Jeremy Leven (born 1941), American director and novelist
- John Levén (born 1963), Swedish musician
- Marian Leven (born 1944), Scottish artist
- Mats Levén, Swedish singer
- Matt Vant Leven (born 1987), New Zealand rugby player
- Mel Leven (1914–2007), American composer
- Milton M. Leven (1911–1979), American engineer
- Narcisse Leven (1833–1915), French lawyer and politician
- Peter Leven (born 1983), Scottish football player
- Ryan Leven (born 1977), American football players
- Steve Leven (born 1982), Australian basketball player
