= Lewinsky (surname) =

Lewinsky is an Ashkenazi Jewish (Yiddish) surname in West Slavic form, derived from Levite. Notable people with the surname include:

- Abraham Lewinsky (1866–1941), German rabbi
- Bernard Lewinsky (born 1943), oncologist and father of Monica Lewinsky
- Charles Lewinsky (born 1946), Swiss writer
- Elhanan Leib Lewinsky (1857–1910), Hebrew writer and Zionist
- Monica Lewinsky (born 1973), former White House intern

== See also ==
- Levinsky
- Lewinski
