= Center for Jewish Art =

Research institute at the Hebrew University of Jerusalem

Center for Jewish Art at the Hebrew University of Jerusalem
- המרכז לאמנות יהודית באוניברסיטה העברית בירושלים
- Established: 1979
- Location: Mount Scopus, Jerusalem, Israel
- Website: cja.huji.ac.il

The Center for Jewish Art (CJA; Hebrew: המרכז לאמנות יהודית, romanized: HaMerkaz LeOmanut Yehudit) is a research institute at the Hebrew University of Jerusalem, devoted to the documentation and research of Jewish visual culture. Established in 1979, it documented and researched objects of Jewish art in ca. 800 museums, libraries, private collections and synagogues in about 50 countries. Today, the Center's archives and collections constitute the largest and most comprehensive body of information on Jewish art and material culture in existence. The CJA's research and documentation is included in the Bezalel Narkiss Index of Jewish Art.

== History ==
The Center for Jewish Art at the Hebrew University of Jerusalem was established in 1979 by Professor Bezalel Narkiss, Israel Prize laureate, with an aim to document objects of Jewish art and produce a comprehensive iconographical index of Jewish subjects. The center was an outcome of Narkiss's iconographical research of medieval Hebrew illuminated manuscripts, which he initiated with Professor Gabrielle Sed-Rajna in 1974. The Index initially consisted of four sections: a Section of Hebrew Illuminated Manuscripts, of Sacred and Ritual Objects, of Ancient Jewish Art, and of Modern Jewish Art.

Professor Bezalel Narkiss headed the CJA until 1991. The next director, Professor Aliza Cohen-Mushlin, established a fifth section for Jewish Ritual Architecture and Funerary Art. Under her leadership, the CJA undertook many research expeditions to post-Communist Central and Eastern Europe, in order to measure endangered synagogues and tombstones in regions, which were previously inaccessible to western scholars. In addition, from 1994 CJA documented those synagogues in Germany which survived the Nazi regime and were not demolished in Kristallnacht. The documentation projects in Germany were done in cooperation with the Department of Architectural History at the Technical University in Braunschweig, headed by Professor Harmen H. Thies. In 1997 this cooperation was institutionalized as the Bet Tfila Research Unit for Jewish Architecture in Europe.

Since 2011, the CJA has been directed by Vladimir Levin. In 2012, the Israeli government recognized the Center's archives as "national heritage." In 2018, the sixth section of the Index, the one for Printed Books in Hebrew Typeset, was established.

From 2019 to 2023, the academic head of the CJA was Prof. Rina Talgam, and since 2023, the academic head is Prof. Sarit Shalev-Eyni.

== Selected publications ==
- Jewish Art (in 1974–1985, Journal of Jewish Art) is an annual devoted to the research of Jewish art. Its editors were Bezalel Narkiss and Aliza Cohen-Mushlin; Professors Ziva Amishai-Maisels and Bianca Kühnel served as guest editors of two issues.
- Rimonim (רימונים) is a Hebrew journal on Jewish art, aiming at bringing the results of academic research to a wider Israeli audience.
- In 1976-1994 the Center for Jewish Art published ten volumes of Jerusalem Index of Jewish Art as collections of card on Hebrew illuminated manuscripts, ritual objects and ancient Jewish art.
- From 2007, Beit Tfila publishes a series of monographs on Jewish architecture and a series of smaller studies on individual Jewish buildings. The editors of both series are Aliza Cohen-Mushlin and Harmen Thies, and they are published by the Imhoff Verlag in English and German.
- Sergey R. Kravtsov and Vladimir Levin, Synagogues in Ukraine: Volhynia. Jerusalem: Zalman Shazar Center for Jewish History and the Center for Jewish Art, 2017 (848 pages, 1,200 ills.).
- Ilia Rodov, In Search for Lost Time: Zussia Efron’s Travelogues on Jewish Art in Romania (in Hebrew). Jerusalem: the Center for Jewish Art, 2023 (264 pages, 329 ills.).

== The Bezalel Narkiss Index of Jewish Art and Material Culture ==
The Bezalel Narkiss Index of Jewish Art and Material Culture is the main project of the Center for Jewish Art at the Hebrew University of Jerusalem. The Index is the world’s largest repository of documentation on Jewish material culture which constantly continues to grow. Currently, the Index includes more than 620,000 images from ca. 800 museums, libraries, private collections, and synagogues all over the world, as well as architectural plans of ca. 1,700 synagogues documented in situ. The images are classified according to their iconographical subject, type of objects, origin, date, style, community, etc. The Index currently contains seven thematic divisions: Historic Synagogues of Europe, Catalogue of Wall Paintings in Central and East European Synagogues (by Boris Khaimovich), Catalogue of Illuminated Esther Scrolls (by Dagmara Budzioch), Slovenian Jewish Heritage, Gross Family Collection, Kurt and Ursula Schubert Archive of Hebrew Illuminated Manuscripts, and a database of Holocaust Memorial Monuments. In 2025, the Index was renamed The Bezalel Narkiss Index of Jewish Art and Material Culture.

The initial digitization of the Index is being undertaken in cooperation with the National Library of Israel and the Judaica Division of Harvard University Library.

== Documentation expeditions ==
- 1. Albania: ancient synagogues (2003).
- 2. Austria: medieval synagogues and manuscripts (1994, 1998-2005); Holocaust memorial monuments (2024).
- 3. Azerbaijan: ritual objects and synagogues (1994, 1997).
- 4. Belarus: synagogues, cemeteries (1993-2003, 2007).
- 5. Bosnia and Herzegovina: synagogues (1998-2004).
- 6. Bulgaria: ritual objects and synagogues (1998).
- 7. Canada: synagogues (1998, 1999).
- 8. Croatia: synagogues, cemeteries, ritual objects (1986, 1987, 1998, 2000-2007, 2021).
- 9. Czech Republic: ritual objects and synagogues (1994, 1995, 2014); synagogues (2023, 2024).
- 10. Dagestan: ritual objects and synagogues (1994).
- 11. Denmark: manuscripts (1979-1989), synagogues (2023).
- 12. Egypt: ritual objects and synagogues (1983, 1984).
- 13. France: manuscripts (1972-1989, 1999, 2002).
- 14. Georgia: ritual objects and synagogues (1997, 1999).
- 15. Germany: synagogues and manuscripts (1985, 1994–2010, 2008-2014), Holocaust memorial monuments (2025).
- 16. Greece: ritual objects and synagogues (1996, 1997, 1999, 2001-2003).
- 17. Hungary: ritual objects (1986, 1988, 1990), synagogues (2018–19).
- 18. India: ritual objects and synagogues (1995).
- 19. Ireland: manuscripts (1975-1980).
- 20. Israel: archaeology, modern art, ritual objects, synagogues, Holocaust memorial monuments (1979-2024).
- 21. Italy: ritual objects and synagogues (1983, 1985, 1990, 1991, 1995, 2000, 2002, 2008, 2009, 2012).
- 22. Latvia: synagogues (2000, 2007-2009), Holocaust memorial monuments (2023-2024).
- 23. Lithuania: ritual objects and synagogues (1993, 2000, 2004, 2006-2009), Holocaust memorial monuments (2022).
- 24. Macedonia: ancient and modern synagogues (2003).
- 25. Moldova: synagogues, cemeteries (1994).
- 26. Montenegro: ancient synagogues and Jewish monuments (2004).
- 27. Morocco: ritual objects and synagogues (1992, 1993).
- 28. Poland: ritual objects (1991-1995, 1997), synagogues and Holocaust memorial monuments (2023-2024).
- 29. Romania: ritual objects, cemeteries and synagogues (1993, 1996, 1997, 2009, 2010, 2011, 2012, 2017, January 2019, September 2019, May 2022, May 2025.
- 30. Russia: manuscripts, cemeteries (1989-1994); synagogues, cemeteries and ritual objects in Siberia (2015); synagogues, cemeteries and ritual objects along the Volga River (2021).
- 31. Serbia: ritual objects and synagogues (1986, 1987, 2001, 2002, 2004).
- 32. Slovakia: synagogues (2001).
- 33. Slovenia: synagogues (2000), Jewish sites, objects, and manuscripts (2018).
- 34. Spain: manuscripts (1987).
- 35. Tunisia: ritual objects and synagogues (1997).
- 36. Turkey: ritual objects and synagogues (1992-1994, 2017).
- 37. Ukraine: synagogues, cemeteries (1991-2003, 2007, 2010-2013).
- 38. United Kingdom: manuscripts (1962-1997).
- 39. United States: manuscripts (1988-1992, 1998)
- 40. Uzbekistan: ritual objects and synagogues (1992, 2000, 2002-2012).
- 41. Vatican: survey of manuscripts (1985).

== See also ==
- Visual arts in Israel
- Jewish art
