= Levens =

Levens may refer to:

== People ==
- Amanda Levens, an American women's college basketball coach
- Dorsey Levens, an American football running back
- Justin Levens, an American mixed martial artist
- Marie Levens, a politician
- Peter Levens, an English lexicographer
- Philip Levens, an American screenwriter and television producer

== Places ==
- Levens, Alpes-de-Haute-Provence, France
- Levens, Alpes-Maritimes, France
- Levens, Cumbria, England

== See also ==
- Leven (disambiguation)
