= Philip Levine =

Philip Levine may refer to:

- Philip Levine (entrepreneur), British entrepreneur, trendsetter and artist
- Philip Levine (physician) (1900–1987), Russian-born American immuno-hematologist, researched blood groups
- Philip Levine (poet) (1928–2015), American populist poet, professor of English and Poet Laureate of the United States
- Philip Levine (politician) (1962-), former mayor of Miami Beach, Florida

== See also ==
- Phillip Levine (born 1963), American economist
