= Bezalel Narkiss =

- בצלאל נרקיס
- Born: 1926; Jerusalem, Mandatory Palestine
- Died: 2008 (aged 81–82); West Jerusalem, Israel
- Resting place: Har HaMenuchot, Jerusalem
- Occupation: Art historian
- Father: Mordechai Narkiss
- Awards: Israel Prize (1999)

Academic background
- Education: Hebrew University

Academic work
- Discipline: Jewish art
- Institutions: Hebrew University; Center for Jewish Art

Bezalel Narkiss (Hebrew: בצלאל נרקיס; 1926–2008) was an Israeli art historian. He was awarded the Israel Prize for his contribution to the field of Jewish art in 1999.

== Early life ==
Bezalel Narkiss was born in Jerusalem, the son of Mordechai Narkiss, director of the Bezalel National Museum. He studied at the Hebrew University of Jerusalem. He served in the Palmach during the Israeli War of Independence and was wounded twice.

== Academic career ==
Narkiss was an expert in illuminated medieval Latin and Hebrew manuscripts and the relationship between Christian and Jewish visual art. After the collapse of communism in Europe in 1989, he embarked on a project to document the synagogues there.

Narkiss was the Nicolas Landau Professor of Art History at the Hebrew University, where he taught since 1964. In 1979, he created the Center for Jewish Art to document endangered Jewish art and architecture.

Narkiss was a visiting professor at the New York University Institute of Fine Arts, Brown University and Princeton University. In addition to his teaching positions, he was art editor of the Masada Press (1963–1975) and Encyclopaedia Judaica. He was editor-in-chief of the Journal of Jewish Art in 1974—1986.

== See also ==
- Visual arts in Israel
