= Judge Levin =

Judge Levin may refer to:

- Gerald Sanford Levin (1906–1971), judge of the United States District Court for the Northern District of California
- Theodore Levin (1897–1970), judge of the United States District Court for the Eastern District of Michigan

== See also ==
- Max S. Levine (1881–1933), judge of the Court of Special Sessions of New York
- Justice Levine (disambiguation)
