= Jack Glatzer =

American violinist

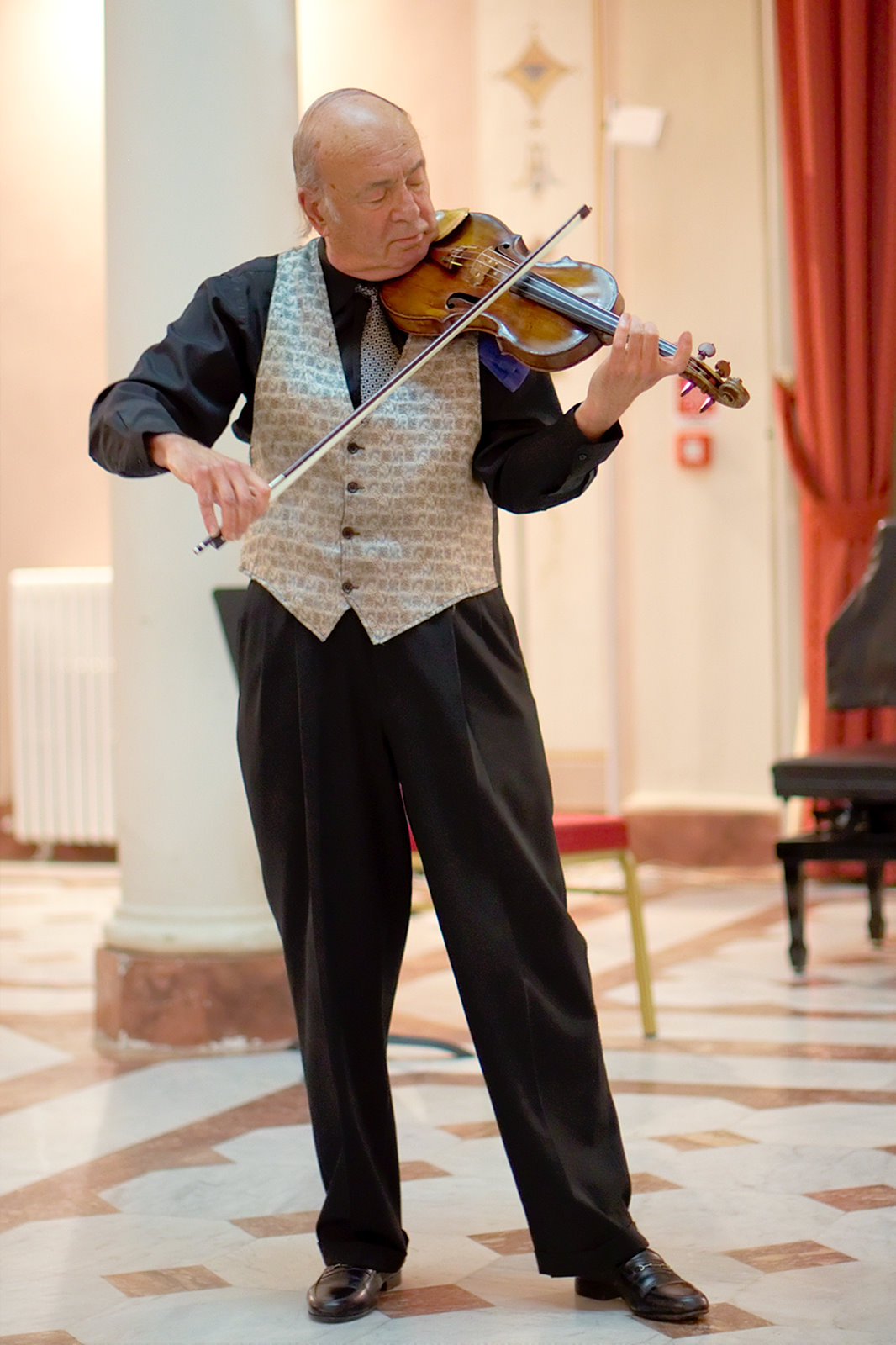
- Jack Glatzer during a recital in Florence, Italy (2 October 2012).
- Born: Jacob Joseph Glatzer; February 9, 1939 (age 87)

Jacob Joseph (Jack) Glatzer is an American violinist. He has performed as a soloist in North and South America, Europe, Asia, Africa, and Australia, and has also released several acclaimed recordings. Glatzer specializes in the literature for solo violin, such as the unaccompanied works of Bach, Paganini, Bartók, and Locatelli, and calls upon his strong academic background in world history and civilization in presenting frequent lecture-recitals of the solo violin literature.

== Early life and musical training ==
Glatzer was born in Dallas, Texas, the son of Fred and Miriam (Feder) Glatzer. He began violin lessons at age five. Glatzer's primary teacher in Dallas was Henry Brahinsky; he pursued additional musical studies with G. Clinton Davis, Marvin Gross, and Leonard Posner. At 14, Glatzer performed a movement of the Violin Concerto No. 4 by Henri Vieuxtemps with the Dallas Symphony Orchestra conducted by Walter Hendl. In 1956, at age 17, he was the winner among all string players and runner-up for the Grand Prize at the Merriweather Post Competition in Washington, D.C., and performed a movement of the Brahms Violin Concerto with the National Symphony Orchestra under Howard Mitchell. Glatzer's playing was strongly praised by Washington music critics Day Thorpe and Paul Hume.

Following his graduation from Forest Avenue High School (now James Madison High School) of the Dallas Independent School District, Glatzer attended Yale University, where he studied violin with Joseph Fuchs while earning a bachelor's degree summa cum laude and Phi Beta Kappa in history. Glatzer, a Rhodes Scholar, subsequently earned an honours degree in history from Oxford University. He undertook further music study at the Musik Akademie in Basel, Switzerland, under Sándor Végh.

== Career ==
In the 1960s, Glatzer performed as concertmaster of the Sándor Végh String Orchestra. He participated in the Prades Festival, where he worked with the legendary cellist Pablo Casals. Glatzer settled in Portugal, where he came to the attention of Maxim Jacobsen, an influential Russian violin pedagogue whose protégés included Benito Mussolini and Queen Elisabeth of Belgium. Jacobsen, then in his 80s, chose Glatzer as the young artist with whom he wished to share certain unpublished writings of the great 19th-century Italian virtuoso violinist Niccolò Paganini, which until then had been kept among Mussolini's papers. In these writings, Paganini described "secret" techniques for producing desired tone colors in his Caprices, Op. 1. Glatzer has since incorporated these techniques into his performances and describes many of them to listeners at recitals and on recordings.

Glatzer has performed concerts and recitals in more than fifty countries and on every continent (presumably excepting Antarctica). Most of his recitals include visual components such as films and slides, as well as spoken discourse. He has led numerous master classes and gives frequent presentations for schoolchildren.

== Personal life ==
Jack Glatzer lives with his wife, Margaret, near Seattle, Washington. He had previously lived for many years in Cascais, Portugal. He was married before with Clara, with whom he lived in Portugal until her death. They had a son: Miguel.

== Discography ==
Glatzer has released several recordings, including the following:

- Locatelli: Caprices. Golden Crest RE-7077. (1982)
- Piano trios of Debussy and Cowell. With the Manitoba Trio. UMSoM 111. (1986?)
- February Suite. Music by S. C. Eckhardt-Gramatté and Robert Turner. With Delores Jerde Keahey, piano. Eckhardt-Gramatté Foundation EGF 200D. (1989)
- Jack Glatzer - Scattered Sparks of Sound. Music of Bloch, de Sousa, Bartók. Chatsworth FCM 1006. Also released as 20th Century Violin Recital by Orient Vision. (recorded 1993; released 1994)
- Cláudio Carneiro: Sonata and other works. With Filipe de Sousa, piano. Strauss. (1995). ISRC SP 4060
- Niccolo Paganini: 24 Caprices for Solo Violin. Orient Vision CW 1002. (recorded 1997; released 1998)
- Murray Adaskin: Sonatine Baroque for unaccompanied violin. On The Adaskin Collection. SOCAN MMI 05. (2000)
- Bach in the Cathedral. With Joseph Munzenrider, harpsichord.
- Jack Glatzer in Recital. Music of Bach, Sculthorpe, Elgar, Paganini. ABC Classic FM.

== Sources ==
- Birth records of Dallas County, Texas.
- Communications. York University libraries newsletter. Undated, c. 1986. (link)
- "Dal-Hi Salute Dated." The Dallas Morning News, 2 December 1963.
- "Dallas Violinist Wins Praise of Washington Music Critics" by Ruth Schumm. The Dallas Morning News, 26 May 1956.
- "Organ Guild Series to Open with Watkins." The Dallas Morning News, 16 November 1952.
- "Two Gain in Music Contest." The New York Times, 22 May 1956.
- Wilkinson, Anthony. Liner notes for Niccolo Paganini: 24 Caprices for Solo Violin. London: Orient Vision, 1998.
