= Lavigne =

Lavigne (French: la vigne) is a French surname meaning literally "the vine" or "the vineyard". Notable people with the surname include:

- Antoine Joseph Lavigne (1816–1886), French oboist
- Ariane Lavigne (born 1984), Canadian snowboarder
- Avril Lavigne (born 1984), Canadian Grammy Award–nominated rock singer
- Brad Lavigne, Canadian political and corporate communications strategist
- Charles Lavigne (1840–1913), Roman Catholic bishop
- J. Conrad Lavigne (1916–2003), Canadian media proprietor
- Grant Lavigne (born 1999), American baseball player
- Laurent Lavigne (politician) (1935–2017), member of the Canadian House of Commons
- Odette Lavigne, Canadian politician from Quebec
- Raymond Lavigne (born 1945), Canadian senator and businessman
- Steve Lavigne (born 1962), American comic book illustrator
- Thomas Lavigne, American politician
- Valentin Lavigne (born 1994), French association football player
- Yanna Lavigne (born 1989), Brazilian actress
