= James Madison High School (Dallas) =

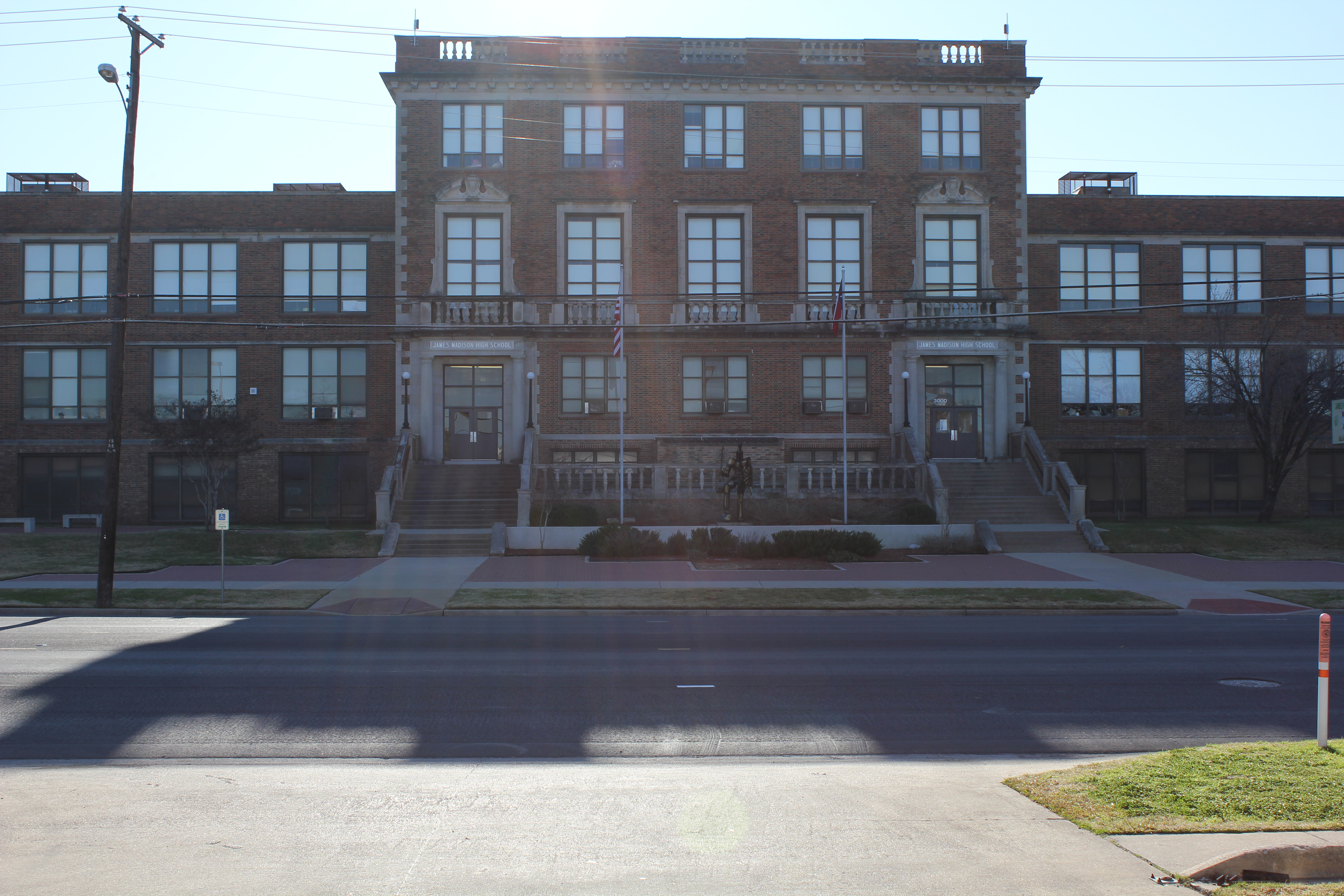
- Madison High School in 2012

Location
- 3000 Martin L. King, Jr. Blvd. Dallas, Texas 75215; United States; 32°46′16″N 96°45′53″W

Information
- Type: Public, Secondary
- Established: 1956
- Locale: South Dallas/Fair Park
- School district: Dallas Independent School District
- Principal: Marian Willard
- Staff: 37.69 (FTE)
- Grades: 9-12
- Enrollment: 388 (2023-2024)
- Student to teacher ratio: 10.29
- Campus size: 3.4 acres (1.4 ha)
- Colors: Green and Gold
- Mascot: Trojan
- Trustee, District: Bernadette Nutall, 9
- Website: madison.dallasisd.org
- Old Forest Avenue High School
- U.S. National Register of Historic Places
- Dallas Landmark
- Location within Texas Location within the United States
- Built: 1916
- Architect: W.P. Ittner
- Architectural style: Renaissance
- MPS: East and South Dallas MPS
- NRHP reference No.: 95000318
- DLMK No.: H/62

Significant dates
- Added to NRHP: March 23, 1995
- Designated DLMK: November 10, 1993

James Madison High School, formerly Forest Avenue High School, is a public secondary school in Dallas, Texas (USA). Madison High School enrolls students in grades 9-12 and is a part of the Dallas Independent School District.

The school is a Dallas Landmark which serves Cedars. It formerly served much of Downtown Dallas, until 2016.

In 2015, the school was rated "Met Standard" by the Texas Education Agency.

== History ==
The original Forest Avenue High School was constructed in 1916 in the style of Italian Renaissance architecture, in what were then fast-growing suburban areas of Dallas. The building is on the United States National Register of Historic Places on the basis of its architecture as well as its importance in the growing South Dallas community over the period ending with the close of World War II in 1945. In 1951 a junior high annex for grades eight and nine was constructed at the south end of the building. Beginning in the late 1940s, the demographics of the surrounding community shifted as large numbers of African-Americans moved into the area.

On June 14, 1956, the Dallas Board of Education announced that Forest Avenue High School would have its attendance zone redrawn to relieve overcrowding at the two existing "Negro schools," Booker T. Washington High School and Lincoln High School. In keeping with its existing policy on racial segregation, the school would be reassigned as a school for black students and the current white student body would attend Crozier Tech High School. The following day, the front page of The Dallas Morning News reported the criticism of the Texas Field Secretary of the NAACP, Edgar Washington, Jr., of the district's decision to turn over the school rather than to integrate. The paper also ran an editorial in the same day's paper applauding the school system for providing black students with an excellent facility while not violating state law by integrating the school. One week later, the paper reported a petition by "the Dad's Club [sic] and Parent-Teacher Association" of the school — with signatures from the student body — to request that the school's name, colors (green and white), and emblem (lion) be retired, with the colors and emblem remaining available to any future whites-only school that might request to use them. The principal announced at that same meeting that all Forest Avenue trophies and other memorabilia were to be transferred to Crozier Tech. The school reopened that fall as James Madison High School, though the district's faculty and staff had been prepared for possible repetition of the 1955 attempts of 24 Black students to enroll in five White schools.

The Forest Avenue High School Alumni Association donated items related to the school to the Dallas Public Library in 1983. The association at one time gave scholarships to Madison students but discontinued after a loss of funding. In October 2012 the association still had 800 members.

== Statistics ==
The attendance rate for students at the school is 93%, compared with the state average of 96%. 12% enroll in special education, 13% enroll in gifted and talent programs, and 4% are considered "limited English proficient."

The ethnic makeup of the school is 58% African American, 40% Hispanic, 1% White American, non-Hispanic, and 1% other races, including Asian and mixed race

== Academic performance ==
In 2011 2% of the black students received a "criterion" or passing grade, as defined by the State of Texas, in SAT and/or ACT. No Hispanic students received criterion scores in the tests that year. In 2012 1% of Madison students made a passing score on the SAT. Jim Schutze of the Dallas Observer wrote that the school performed poorly and did not deserve the "high esteem" it received in South Dallas. In 2013 there was a rumor that principal Marian Willard was going to be fired in light of the poor performance.

== Athletics ==
The James Madison Trojans compete in the following sports in the UIL:

- Baseball
- Basketball
- Cross Country
- Football
- Golf
- Soccer
- Softball
- Swimming and Diving
- Tennis
- Track and Field
- Band
- Volleyball
- Wrestling

=== State Titles ===
- Boys Basketball
  - 1997(3A), 2009(3A), 2017(3A), 2019(3A), 2022(3A), 2026(3A/D1)

== Notable alumni ==
As Forest Avenue High School:

- Jack Glatzer '56, concert violinist
- Stanley Marcus '21, department-store magnate
- Aaron Spelling '40, television producer
- Ruthe Lewin Winegarten '47, author and activist

As James Madison High School:

- Admon Gilder, basketball player for NBA G League Ignite
- Stone Johnson, 1960 Olympic track star and Kansas City Chiefs player
- Michael A. Lenoir, 2013 President Elect of the National Medical Association; CEO Ethnic Health America
- Brett Maxie, former NFL player and assistant coach
- Dave Stallworth, NBA player (first-round draft pick), won championship with New York Knicks
- Sylvia Stanfield, senior diplomat and first black female U.S. ambassador to Brunei
- Alan Thompson, former CFL and WFL player
- Dwight White, former NFL Pro Bowl player, member of Pittsburgh Steelers "Steel Curtain" defense
- Danny Gray, NFL player for the Philadelphia Eagles

== See also ==
- National Register of Historic Places listings in Dallas County, Texas
- List of Dallas Landmarks
- History of the African Americans in Dallas-Fort Worth
