= Levin (given name) =

Name

- Gender: Man
- Language: English

Origin
- Origin: Old German word or Old English word
- Meaning: dear friend
- Region of origin: Germany

Other names
- Alternative spelling: Leobwin, Liebwin, Leofwine
- Variant form: Levi
- Nickname: Levi
- Related names: Levi

Levin is a masculine given name. It is a modern German version of the Old English name Leofwine or the Old German Leobwin or Liebwin, meaning "dear friend." Dutch variants include Lieven and Lievin. A rare modern English variant is Lewin. It can also be a variant of Levi, and is a surname with different origins.

Notable people with the name include:

- Levin C. Bailey (c. 1892–1952), judge of the Maryland Court of Appeals
- Levin August von Bennigsen (1745–1826), German general in the service of the Russian Empire
- Levin Bates (fl. c. 1830s), proprietor of the Levin Bates House, Kentucky
- Levin Bufkin (c. 1533–1617), English landowner
- Levin Gale (1784–1834), American politician
- Levin Goldschmidt (1829–1897), German jurist, judge and academic
- Levin H. Campbell (born 1927), United States Circuit Judge
- Levin H. Campbell Jr. (1886–1976), U.S. Army lieutenant general
- Levin Corbin Handy (c. 1855–1932), American photographer
- Levin Irving Handy (1861–1922), American educator, lawyer and politician
- Levin Thomas Handy Irving (1828–1892), justice of the Maryland Court of Appeals
- Levin Jones (1847–1914), American professional baseball player
- Levin Kipnis (1894–1990), Israeli children's author and poet
- Levin Major Lewis (1832–1886), Confederate States Army colonel during the American Civil War
- Levin R. Marshall (1800–1870), American banker and planter in the Antebellum South
- Levin Moreno (born 1989), Colombian para-athlete
- Levin Muller (born 1998), South African cricketer
- Levin Öztunalı (born 1996), German professional footballer
- Levin M. Powell (1798–1885), U.S. Navy rear admiral
- Levin Rauch (1819–1890), Austrian-Hungarian politician
- Levin Schücking (1814–1883), German novelist
- Levin Ludwig Schücking (1878–1964), German scholar of the English language and English literature
- Levin Winder (1757–1819), Revolutionary Army officer in the American Revolutionary War

== See also ==
- Levin (surname)
- Lewin
- Levon (name)
