= Leofwine =

Leofwine is an Old English name meaning "dear friend." A modern German equivalent is Levin or Lewin. The name may refer to:

- Leofwine (bishop of Lindsey), fl. 953
- Leofwine, Ealdorman of the Hwicce died 1028
- Leofwine Godwinson, killed at the Battle of Hastings
- Leofwin, bishop of Lichfield (in office 1053–1070)
