= Lavine =

Lavine may refer to:

- Charles Lavine (born 1947), a member of the New York State Assembly
- Eric Lavine (born 1971), a Barbadian football player who played in the League of Ireland
- Jacqueline Lavine (born 1929), an American swimmer
- John Lavine, an American journalist and dean of Northwestern University's Medill School of Journalism
- Mark Lavine (1973–2001), a West Indian cricketer
- Michael Lavine (born 1963), a portrait photographer based in New York City
- Pamela Lavine (born 1969), a West Indies cricketer
- Zach LaVine (born 1995), American basketball player

== See also ==
- Levine
- Lake Lavine, Michigan, a small lake, 87 acres (350,000 m^{2}), in south central Michigan
- Lavigne
