= Levene =

Levene is a surname. Notable people with the surname include:

- Allan Levene (born 1949 or 1950), British-American information technology specialist and political candidate
- George Levene (1885–1930), American football player and coach at the college level
- Gus Levene (1911–1979), American composer, arranger, orchestrator, guitarist
- Gustavo Gabriel Levene (1905–1987), Argentinian historian and writer
- Harry Levene, English boxing promoter, associated with Terry Lawless
- Howard Levene (1914–2003), American statistician and geneticist
- John Levene (born 1941), English film and television actor
- Keith Levene (1957–2022), English musician
- Peter Levene (born 1941), English businessman and nobleman
- Philip Levene (1926–1973), English television writer, actor, and producer
- Phoebus Levene (1869–1940), biochemist who identified the components of DNA
- Rebecca Levene, British author
- Sam Levene (1905–1980), American stage and film actor

== See also ==
- Levene's test, a statistical test used to assess variance between data sets
- Stora Levene, a locality in Västra Götaland County, Sweden
- Levine
