= Levinz =

Levinz is a surname, Notable people with the surname include:

- Baptist Levinz (before 1660 - 1693), Anglican churchman
- Creswell Levinz (1627–1701), English judge
- Robert Levinz (1615–1650), English Royalist, executed as a spy
- William Levinz (1625-1698), doctor of medicine, Regius Professor of Greek at Oxford University
- William Levinz (MP) (c. 1671 – 1747)

== See also ==
- Levin (disambiguation)
