= Arnold Levin =

American cartoonist

- Area: Cartoonist

Arnold Levin is an American cartoonist whose work has appeared in The New Yorker and elsewhere.

== Awards ==
He received the National Cartoonist Society Gag Cartoon Award for 1991 and 1992.
