= Ryan Leven =

American soccer player

Personal information
- Date of birth: November 29, 1977 (age 48)
- Place of birth: Pittsburgh, Pennsylvania, United States
- Height: 5 ft 9 in (1.75 m)
- Positions: Midfielder; forward

Youth career
- 1996–2000: Ohio State Buckeyes

Senior career*
Years	Team	Apps	(Gls)
1994–1995	Pittsburgh Stingers	0	(0)
1999–2000	Pittsburgh Riverhounds	67	(33)
2000–2002	Columbus Crew	0	(0)
Total		67	(33)
- * Club domestic league appearances and goals

== Youth ==
Born in Pittsburgh, Leven grew up in Hampton, Pennsylvania. During this time he played for the Pittsburgh Strikers and Beadling SC club teams, while also playing for Western Pennsylvania ODP. He graduated from Hampton High School. He attended the Ohio State University, playing on the men's soccer team from 1996 to 2000. Leven graduated with a degree in Management Information Systems (MIS).

== Professional player career ==
Leven started his career with the now defunct Pittsburgh Stingers in the Continental Indoor Soccer League (CISL). The Pittsburgh Riverhounds signed Leven in 1999 as an undrafted free agent. In the fall of 2000, Leven was transferred to the Columbus Crew where he participated as a training team member. On August 20, 2002, the San Diego Soccers selected Leven in the sixth round of the MISL Dispersal Draft. He did not sign with the Soccers. Leven retired from professional soccer in 2002. Leven was inducted into his high school sports hall of fame in 2006.

== Coaching career ==
=== College Coaching ===
Tiffin University Men's Soccer Assistant Coach - 2002 – 2005
Heidelberg University Director of Soccer & Head Men's Soccer Coach - 2005 – 2010
Otterbein University Men's Soccer Coach - 2010 – 2015

=== High school coaching ===
New Albany High School (Ohio) - Varsity Girls Soccer Assistant Coach - 2010 - 2015
Gahanna Christian Academy - Head Varsity Boys Soccer Coach - 2016
Bexley High School - Head Varsity Girls Soccer Coach - 2017 - 2019

=== Youth club coaching ===
Hampton Soccer Club - 1995 - 1996
Dublin Soccer Club - 1996 - 2009
New Albany Soccer Club - 2009 - 2016
Columbus Crew Youth Development Program - 2011 - 2016
FC614 - 2016 - 2019
Ohio Premier - 2019–Present
