= Harold Levin =

American violist, composer, and conductor

Harold Levin (born 13 March 1956) is an American violist, composer, and conductor.

An Interlochen Arts graduate, Levin holds a BS from Ball State University, a MM from the University of Cincinnati, and a DMA from Rutgers University.

He has been a violist with the Louisville Orchestra and has taught at the University of Nebraska–Lincoln, where he directed the Lincoln Youth Symphony Orchestra. In addition, Levin has also served as conductor and Professor of Viola at the University of Memphis, Western Illinois University, and Bucknell University. Levin has also been conductor of several youth orchestras; he was the principal conductor of the Florida Symphony Youth Orchestra. In addition, Levin also plays in several ensembles, including the Herrick Ensemble, and is a composer and frequent guest artist.
