= Ruthe Lewin Winegarten =

American historian (1929–2004)

Ruthe Lewin Winegarten (August 26, 1929 – June 14, 2004) was an American author, activist, and historian.

== Early life ==
Born Ruthe Lee Lewin in Dallas on August 26, 1929, she was the daughter of Charles and Celia (Cohen) Lewin.

Winegarten attended Forest Avenue High School (known today as James Madison High School), receiving a scholarship to attend Southern Methodist University.

Lewin also attended the University of Texas at Austin, where she received her bachelor's degree in anthropology in 1950, and was active in helping to get the first black student admitted to the University of Texas Law School. She later earned a master's degree in social work from the University of Texas at Arlington and did coursework for a doctorate in history at the University of Texas at Dallas.

== Career ==
Before moving back to Austin, Texas in 1978, Winegarten worked for various social causes in Dallas, including serving as the southwest regional director of the Anti-defamation league of the B'nai B'rith, and as assistant director of the Jewish Welfare Federation in Dallas. She also was active in the North Dallas Democratic Women's Club and performed in musical spoofs with future Texas Governor Ann Richards.

While researching a thesis paper in the 1970s at the University of Texas at Dallas, she compiled an oral history of Annie Mae Hunt. Later she and collaborators would edit these conversations, including Hunt's recollections of her grandparents' histories of slavery, into a popular book, I am Annie Mae: A Black Texas Woman in Her Own Words and then subsequently into a musical drama.

After returning to Austin, Winegarten became director of Austin's Women's Center. In 1979, she was appointed as Curator of the Texas Women's History Project, which developed the touring exhibit "Texas Women: A Celebration of History" (now housed at Texas Woman's University). Later, Winegarten oversaw the addition of women to the exhibits in the Bob Bullock Texas History Museum in Austin.

Winegarten twice won the Liz Carpenter Award, for her books Black Texas Women: 150 Years of Trial and Triumph, and Capitol Women: Texas Female Legislators 1923–1999 (with Nancy Baker Jones). The Liz Carpenter Award is given annually for the best scholarly book on the history of women and Texas published during the calendar year by the Texas State Historical Association. Winegarten was made a fellow of the TSHA in 2003. She authored or co-authored a total of 18 books, primarily on subjects in Texas women's history. The last of these was Las Tejanas: 300 years of History (with Teresa Palomo Acosta).

== Personal life ==
Ruthe Lewin married Wendell Addington in 1948, Thomas W. Sanders in 1952, Alvin Winegarten in 1956, and Stanley Schneider in 1986. She bore three children, Martha Frances Addington, (1952–2007), Marc David Sanders (1954–2022), and Debra Lou Winegarten (1957– 2018).

== Death and legacy ==
The Ruthe Winegarten Memorial Foundation for Women in Texas History, a non-profit 501(c)(3) organization, was started by a group of her colleagues to carry on her work. The Foundation's website is: www.womenintexashistory.org.

Winegarten died in 2004, of a self-inflicted gunshot wound. She had been living at an assisted-living facility and was in the early stages of dementia.

Writings about Ruthe Winegarten include the book Mum's the Word (Austin, Texas: Sunbelt Media, 2001), and an obituary in Off Our Backs. "Ruthe Winegarten" by Nancy Baker Jones, in Patrick L. Cox and Kenneth E. Hendrickson, Jr., eds., Writing the Story of Texas (Austin: University of Texas Press, 2013).

== Bibliography ==
- Jones, Nancy Baker (2013). "Ruthe Winegarten". In Cox, Patrick L.; Hendrickson, Kenneth E. Jr. (eds.). Writing the Story of Texas. University of Texas Press. ISBN 978-0292748750.
