= River Leven =

River Leven could refer to one of the following:

- River Leven, Cumbria (historically in Lancashire), England
- River Leven, Dunbartonshire, Scotland
- River Leven, Fife, Scotland
- River Leven, North Yorkshire, England
- River Leven (Tasmania), Australia
  - Leven Canyon, on the River Leven (Tasmania)
