= Justice Levine =

Justice Levine may refer to:

- Beryl J. Levine (1935–2022), associate justice of the North Dakota Supreme Court
- Howard A. Levine (born 1932), associate justice of the New York Court of Appeals
- Irving A. Levine (1924–1978), associate justice of the Maryland Court of Appeals
- Isadore Levine (1897–1963), associate justice of the Supreme Court of Indiana

== See also ==
- Charles Levin (judge) (1926–2020), associate justice of the Michigan Supreme Court
- Judge Levin (disambiguation)
