= Petra Levin =

American microbiologist

Petra Anne Levin is an American microbiologist. She is a professor in the department of biology and co-director of the Plant and Microbial Biosciences Graduate Program at Washington University in St. Louis.

== Education and early career ==
Levin graduated, cum laude, from Williams College with a bachelor of arts in biology in 1989. She worked as a science teacher at the American School in Switzerland from 1989 to 1990. Levin completed a doctor of philosophy in biology from Harvard University in 1996. Her dissertation was titled Asymmetric Division During Spore Formation in Bacillus subtillis. Her doctoral advisor was Richard Losick. Levin was a postdoctoral fellow in the MIT Department of Biology under advisor Alan Grossman.

== Career ==
Levin was an assistant professor at Washington University in St. Louis in the department of biology. She was an associate professor from 2008 to 2015 before becoming a professor. In 2015, she became the co-director of the Plant and Microbial Biosciences Graduate Program at Washington University.

Levin became a member of the editorial advisory board of Molecular Microbiology in 2008. In 2016, Levin became a front matter editor of PLOS Genetics. In 2018, she became an editorial board member of Current Biology.

== Awards and honors ==
Levin was awarded a National Science Foundation CAREER Award in 2005. She was a Fulbright scholar in the Netherlands from 2015 to 2016.
