= Abraham Lewinsky =

German rabbi (1866–1941)

Abraham Lewinsky (1866–1941) was a late nineteenth to early twentieth century German rabbi. He was born on 1 March 1866 in Loslau, Upper Silesia, Kingdom of Prussia. He studied at the University of Breslau from 1884 to 1887, obtaining a (Ph.D.), while pursuing his rabbinical studies at the Jewish Theological Seminary in Breslau. In 1890 he became rabbi to Weilburg, and two years later assumed leadership as land rabbi of the Land Rabbinate of Hildesheim in the Province of Hanover, retiring in 1935. He died on 18 December 1941 in Mainz, People's State of Hesse.

Lewinsky is best known for his studies of the 1st century Jewish historian Josephus. He has also published works on a predecessor in the Hildesheim rabbinate, the seventeenth-century rabbi Samuel Hameln, brother-in-law of Glückel of Hameln, and on the general history of Judaism in Central and Eastern Europe from the 16th to the eighteenth century.

== Published works ==
- Lewinsky, A. Beiträge zur Kenntnis der religionsphilosophischen Anschauungen des Flavius Josephus. Breslau: Preuss & Jünger, 1887.
- Lewinsky, A. Festpredigt zur Feier des 50jährigen Bestehens der Synagoge in Hildesheim am 12. November 1899. Hildesheim: Gebr. Gerstenberg, 1899
- Lewinsky, A. Der Hildesheimer Rabbiner Samuel Hameln. Hildesheim: A. Lax, 1900.
- Lewinsky, A. Die Kinder des Hildesheimer Rabbiners Samuel Hameln. Hidesheim: A. Lax, 1901.
- Lewinsky, A. Zur Geschichte der Juden in Polen und Russlands während des 18. Jahrhundert. St. Petersburg, 1907.
