= Levinsky =

Levinsky or Levinský is a Jewish surname of partial Slavic origin. The first part comes from the word Levite. Notable people with the surname include:

- Alex Levinsky (1910–1990), professional ice hockey player in the National Hockey League
- Battling Levinsky (1891–1949), light heavyweight boxing champion of the world
- Benjamin Levinsky (1893–1922), American gang leader, labor racketeer, and organized crime figure
- Dmitri Levinsky (born 1981), Kazak professional ice hockey player
- Jaroslav Levinský (born 1981), professional doubles tennis player from the Czech Republic
- King Levinsky (1910–1991), also known as Kingfish Levinsky, an American heavyweight boxer
- Roland Levinsky (1943–2007), academic researcher in biomedicine and a university senior manager
- Tomer Levinsky (born 1989), Israeli businessman
- Walt Levinsky (1929–1999), American big band and orchestral player, composer, arranger, and band leader

== See also ==
- The Rise of David Levinsky, novel by Abraham Cahan
- Lewinski
- Lewinsky (surname)
- Ivan Levynskyi (1851–1919), Ukrainian-German architect
