= Lewin (disambiguation) =

Lewin is a surname.

Lewin may also refer to:

== Places in Poland ==
- Lewin Brzeski
- Lewin Kłodzki
- Lewin, Kuyavian-Pomeranian Voivodeship
- Lewin, Łódź Voivodeship

== Other uses ==
- T. M. Lewin, UK-based gentleman's shirtmakers
- The Lewin Group, a policy research and consulting organization
