= Gustavo Gabriel Levene =

Argentinian historian and writer

Gustavo Gabriel Levene (August 30, 1905 – 1987) was an Argentinian historian and writer.

== Biography ==
Gustavo Gabriel Levene was born on August 30, 1905, in San Fernando del Valle de Catamarca, Catamarca, Argentina where he begins his elementary studies, later moving to Buenos Aires, where he finishes his secondary studies. He enrolls at the Faculty of Medicine at the University of Buenos Aires but he later drops out. He then continued his studies at the Faculty of Humanities and Educational Science at the University of La Plata, from where he graduated with a professor's degree. As such, he holds several positions in different high schools, and was director of the Cangallo Schule school from 1962 to 1965. He was also assistant to the minister of education, and member of the editorial board of the Biblioteca de Mayo (May's Library) of the Senate.

He was a prolific historian who conceived history from a human perspective through the common life of his historical characters, their traditions and beliefs. This point of view was unique during a time in which history was written based on heroic military facts or about people who were able to change the course of history. Among his works it stands out the New Argentine History, Costumbrist and Social View from the Conquest to Our Days (Nueva historia argentina, panorama costumbrista y social desde la Conquista hasta nuestros días) and History of the Argentine Presidents (Historia de los presidentes argentinos), the latter covering from Bernardino Rivadavia's presidency to the third presidency of Juan Domingo Perón. His interpretation of the nation's history adheres to the liberal tradition, viewing the colonial period like an arid and unprogressive era, having in Bernardino Rivadavia his early nineteenth century hero, and viewing Juan Manuel de Rosas as a reactionary, defender of the colonial system who was useful for the British interests. He stepped into the historical playwright with Mariano Moreno, a play that won the First National Prize of Literature 1957. He went on to write other historical plays about the personalities of José de San Martín and Juan Martín de Pueyrredón in The Unknown (El desconocido), Bernardino Rivadavia in Bernardino, Esteban Echeverría in The Tomorrow (El mañana) and Lucio V. Mansilla in A Man at the Mirror (Un hombre ante el espejo). However, it is Childhood in Catamarca (Niñez en Catamarca) his most known and piece of work, which is an autobiographic tale that has been adopted by many Argentine schools as a lecture book. Gustavo G. Levene died in Buenos Aires, in 1987.

== Works ==
- Fiction
  - Minuto meridiano (1930)
  - Niñez en Catamarca (1946)
- Poetry
  - Poemas para mi infancia de hoy (1967)
- Drama
  - Mariano Moreno (1953), First National Prize of Literature 1957.
  - Bernardino (1960)
  - El desconocido (1967)
  - El mañana: escenificación del romance de Esteban Echeverría y Mariquita Sánchez (1975)
  - Teatro histórico argentino (1980), anthology integrated by Mariano Moreno, Bernardino, El mañana, El desconocido, Un hombre ante el espejo.
- Children's Literature
  - Sultán (2003), illustrated by Marcela Purita. A tale selected from Niñez en Catamarca.
- History
  - Nueva historia argentina; panorama costumbrista y social desde la Conquista hasta nuestros días (1956)
  - La Argentina se hizo así (1960)
  - Historia de los presidentes argentinos (1961), with Alberto Palcos, Boleslao Lewin, Ricardo Rodríguez Molas and Félix Luna
  - Hombres de la Argentina, de Mayo a Caseros (1962), with Gregorio Weimberg, et al.
  - Historia ilustrada argentina, desde la colonia hasta nuestros días (1963)
  - Breve historia de la independencia argentina (1966)
  - Para una antología del odio argentino (1975)
  - La Argentina Hoy (1979)
  - Hombres de la Argentina: de mayo a la crisis del 30 (1987)
  - Breve Historia de la Argentina (2011)
- Zoology
  - Vida animal (1949)
