= Leven station (disambiguation) =

Leven station is a railway station on the Levenmouth rail link in Scotland.

Leven station or Leven railway station may also refer to:

- Leven Station, Mpumalanga, a town in South Africa
- Leven railway station (Manitoba), a railway station in Canada
- Leven railway station, a proposed station on the North Holderness Light Railway in England in the early 20th century
