= Antoine Joseph Lavigne =

French oboist

Antoine Joseph Lavigne (23 March 1816 – 1886) was a French oboist. A highly regarded musician, he lived in England for much of his career, and was a member of the Hallé Orchestra.

== Life ==
Lavigne was born in Besançon in 1816, and received his early musical education from his father, a musician in an infantry regiment. In 1830 he was admitted a pupil of the Conservatoire de Paris, where he studied the oboe under Gustave Vogt. He was obliged to leave in May 1835, when his father's regiment was ordered from Paris. He rejoined the school in October 1836, and obtained the first prize in 1837.

Lavigne was for several years principal oboe at the Théâtre-Italien at Paris. In 1841 he came to England, and appeared as oboe soloist at the Promenade Concerts at Theatre Royal, Drury Lane. Later he was for many years a member of the Hallé Orchestra in Manchester. He addressed himself with great earnestness to applying to the oboe the system of keys which Boehm had contrived for the flute, and devoted several years to perfecting the instrument.

The music critic William Henry Husk wrote: "This admirable player has great execution and feeling; but what he is most remarkable for is his power and length of breath, which by some secret known to himself enables him to give the longest phrases without breaking them."

Lavigne was among the musicians in an orchestra which in 1853 travelled to America with the conductor Louis-Antoine Jullien. A critic in Boston wrote that Lavigne was "generally considered the first oboist in Europe; his execution is most exquisitely delicate and the tone very thin and cutting, as it were, like glass."
