= Alan Levin (business) =

American business executive

Alan Levin is the former CFO of Pfizer, Inc. He joined Pfizer in 1987, was elected treasurer in 1995 and was named vice president in 1997. Since April 2003 he oversaw the company's tax, treasury and accounting services organizations as senior vice president for finance and strategic management. He is a 1976 graduate of the New York University Stern School of Business. On May 21, 2007, Pfizer announced Levin's retirement as well as that of R&D Chief John LaMattina.
