= Alan Levin (Internet governance) =

Alan Levin (born 15 April 1968 in Johannesburg, South Africa) is a South African computer scientist and internet activist.

== Early life and career ==
He obtained a Computer Science degree at the University of the Witwatersrand in 1990 and left South Africa to avoid his conscription to the South African army during the last years of apartheid. After the government changed in 1994, Alan returned to South Africa and completed his Master's in Business Administration (MBA) at the University of Cape Town. Alan is a co-founder of Telkom Internet, one of the biggest ISPs in Africa.

== Internet Activist ==
Alan is a champion of Internet user rights and lobbied for 9 years for freedom in telecommunications in South Africa. From 1999 to 2008 he regularly presented submissions in the South African Parliament on behalf of the Cape Telecommunications User Forum as well as the ISOC South Africa.

Alan currently operates a niche ISP, Vanilla. He has performed the roles of Chairman of the Internet Society - ISOC South Africa (2004–2007), he sat on the founding Boards of Directors of AfriNIC (2004–2006), the .za DNA (2003–2008) and Future Perfect Corporation (2000–current). Alan established the Spammer Bounty Hunter program and is currently participating in the Village Telco project.
