= Philip Levine (entrepreneur) =

British entrepreneur and artist

- Born: 1981 (age 43–44); Manchester, United Kingdom
- Occupation(s): Artist and entrepreneur
- Known for: Body art using his head in what he termed baldazzling

Philip Levine is a British entrepreneur and artist, who creates body art using head designs, for which he has coined the term baldazzling. He uses his head as a canvas for creativity. He also founded brand and sponsorship agency Two Penny Blue and co-founded the collective Lazy Gramophone, a couture arts and design label.

== Career ==
Philip Levine started using his head as a canvas for creativity in 2006 when he began to go bald. He did not want simply to shave his head but to use it as an art form. Philip's head designs have gained attention around the world.

Levine teamed with a body painter, Kat Sinclair, who created designs ranging from his 1000 Swarovski crystal headpiece to homages to artists such as Roy Lichtenstein and Hokusai. Philip collaborated with Gillette, who supported his debut exhibition in a London gallery in May 2011. He was an exhibit during the Friday Late evening at the V&A on 25 March 2011, where he was displayed on a plinth with his crystal head design.

Philip has worked for Art Below and as a cultural attaché for the Dutch embassy in London.

Levine co-founded Two Penny Blue, with Dan Johnston and Mark Goddard, a creative agency dealing in brand, sponsorship and business development, production coordination and event organisation. In 2003, he co-founded the collective Lazy Gramophone, a couture arts and design label that supports developing artists. He is business developer for innovative ethical fashion designer Ada Zanditon's and was part of The Observer Future 500 2011.

Between 30 January and 29 February 2012, Levine's work was featured at Art Below's first "pop up" billboard show in America in New Orleans Billboard space used normally for advertising featured a mix of urban and contemporary art. A curated selection of 20 billboards flanking the major Mardi Gras parade routes. Running alongside the billboard show was an exhibition of the artists original works at Gallery Orange based in the French Quarter. Scenes and moments from this exhibition were screened on the Art Below website in April 2012. Levine featured in Art Below's earlier exhibition Art in Motion. For two weeks from 11 April 2011, Art Below took over the digital projection screens (2 m high x 3.7m wide) on the Westbound Central line platform at Liverpool Street for "Art in Motion". Curated by Art Below, "Art in Motion" was a series of short films showing artists at work.
