= Vladimir Levin (historian) =

Israeli historian (born 1971)

- ולדימיר לוין
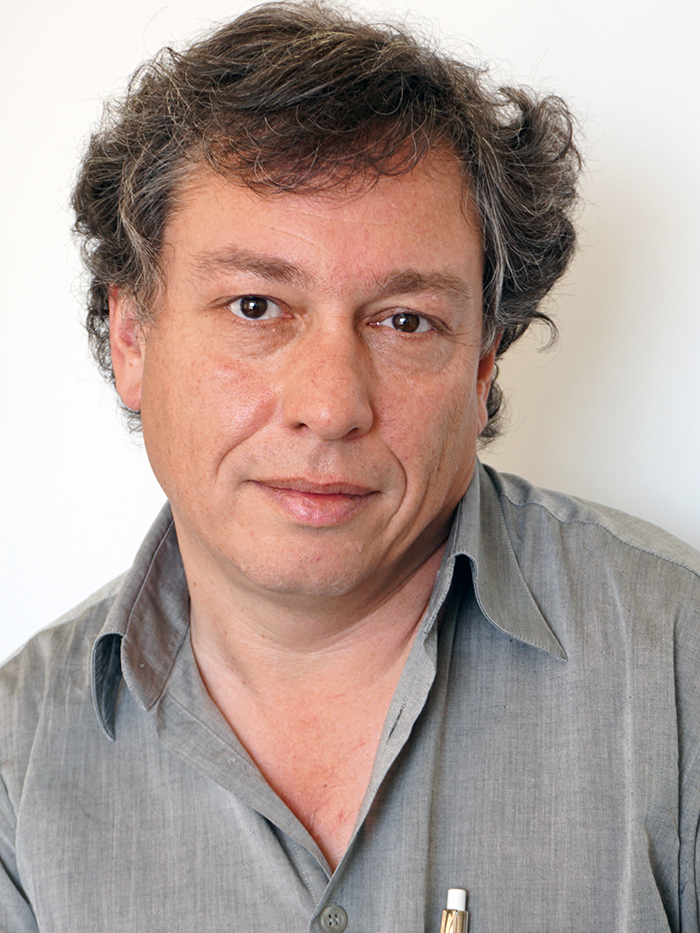
- Born: October 4, 1971 (age 54); St. Petersburg
- Citizenship: Israel
- Education: Hebrew University of Jerusalem
- Occupations: historian, art historian
- Organization: Center for Jewish Art

Vladimir Levin (Hebrew: ולדימיר לוין) is an Israeli historian specializing in east European Jewish history. Since 2011, he has been a director of the Center for Jewish Art at the Hebrew University of Jerusalem.

== Work ==
Levin's research focuses on modern east European social history and synagogues. He received his Ph.D. from the Hebrew University of Jerusalem as a student of Jonathan Frankel. Levin authored From Revolution to War: Jewish Politics in Russia, 1907–1914, co-authored Synagogues in Ukraine: Volhynia, and co-edited Synagogues in Lithuania: A Catalogue. Levin has written on social and political aspects of modern Jewish history in Eastern Europe, synagogue architecture and ritual objects, Jewish religious Orthodoxy, Jewish-Muslim relations, Jews and Jewish politics in Lithuania, etc. (see the list of selected publications below). Currently, he is preparing for publication his new book Orthodox, Socialist, Liberal: Jewish Politics in the Early Twentieth-Century Russian Empire and working on another book, which explores Jewish heritage in Siberia, together with Anna Berezin.

Since 1993, Levin has been working at the Center for Jewish Art, which aims to research and document Jewish art and material culture across the globe. Since 2011, Levin has been serving as the Center's director. After assuming the position, Levin launched the project on digitalization of all the documentation the Center possessed, which resulted in the creation of the Bezalel Narkiss Index of Jewish Art. For now, the Index includes more than 550 thousand images and it is constantly growing due to the Center's own research trips and due to collaboration with other research institutions.

Recently, Levin has launched another project entitled Holocaust Memorial Monuments in collaboration with the Sue and Leonard Miller Center for Contemporary Judaic Studies, University of Miami. The project aims "to collect and preserve digital documentation about Holocaust memorial monuments, including standardized mapping, photography, description, and historical research."

== Selected publications ==
=== Books ===
- Vladimir Levin and Sergey R. Kravtsov, Synagogues in Ukraine: Volhynia. Jerusalem: Zalman Shazar Center for Jewish History and the Center for Jewish Art, 2017.
- Vladimir Levin, From Revolution to War: Jewish Politics in Russia, 1907–1914 [ממהפכה למלחמה: הפוליטיקה היהודית ברוסיה, 1907–1914]. Jerusalem: Zalman Shazar Center for Jewish History, 2016 (in Hebrew).

=== Edited volumes ===
- Vladimir Levin and Victoria Gerasimova (guest editors), Judaic-Slavic Journal 1(5) (2021), a special issue devoted to Jewish history and culture in Siberia.
- Vladimir Levin, Aliza Cohen-Mushlin, Sergey Kravtsov, Giedrė Mickūnaitė and Jurgita Šiaučiūnaitė-Verbickienė (eds.), Synagogues in Lithuania: A Catalogue. 2 vols. Vilnius: Vilnius Academy of Art Press, 2010–2012.

=== Articles and chapters in edited volumes ===
- Vladimir Levin, "Jewish Cultural Heritage in the USSR and After its Collapse," in Becoming Post-Communist: Jews and the New Political Cultures of Russia and Eastern Europe, ed. Eli Lederhendler (New York: Oxford University Press, 2022), pp. 86–120. https://doi.org/10.1093/oso/9780197687215.003.0006
- Vladimir Levin, "Synagogues in the System of Jewish Self-Government in Tsarist Russia," Polin: Studies in Polish Jewry 34 (2022): 261–281. https://doi.org/10.2307/j.ctv25zcvmq.18
- Vladimir Levin, "The Architecture of Gender: Women in the Eastern European Synagogue," Jewish History 35 (2021): 89–134. https://doi.org/10.1007/s10835-021-09412-4.
- Vladimir Levin, "Russian Jews and the Russian Right: Why Were There no Jewish Right-Wing Politics in the Late Russian Empire?" in The Tsar, the Empire, and the Nation: Dilemmas of Nationalization in Russia's Western Borderlands, 1905–1915, eds. Darius Staliūnas and Yoko Aoshima (Budapest: CEU, 2021), pp. 357–381. https://openresearchlibrary.org/viewer/46c7b1f4-549b-4010-a126-1d2ded7d0211/6
- Vladimir Levin, "Reform or Consensus? Choral Synagogues in the Russian Empire," Arts 9 (2020), 1–49. https://www.mdpi.com/2076-0752/9/2/72
- Vladimir Levin, "Denying Tradition: Academic Historiography on Jewish Orthodoxy in Eastern Europe," Polin: Studies in Polish Jewry 29 (2017): 255–284.
- Vladimir Levin and Darius Staliūnas, "Lite in the Jewish Mental Maps" in Spatial Concepts of Lithuania in the Long Nineteenth Century, ed. Darius Staliūnas (Boston: Academic Studies Press, 2016), pp. 312–371.
- Vladimir Levin, "Civil Law and Jewish Halakhah: Problems of Coexistence in the Late Russian Empire" in Religion in the Mirror of Law: Eastern European Perspectives from the Early Modern Period till 1939, eds. Yvonne Kleinmann, Stephan Stach, and Tracie Wilson (Frankfurt am Main: Vittorio Klostermann, 2016), pp. 213–239.
