= Levy (surname) =

- Pronunciation: /ˈliːvi, ˈlɛvi/

Origin
- Language: Hebrew
- Meaning: joining

Other names
- Variant forms: Levi, Lévi, Lévy; Lewy, Lewi, Lewj (languages: Polish, German, etc.); Weil, Veil, etc. (in anagram form)

Levy or Lévy is a surname generally of Hebrew origin. Another spelling of the surname—among multiple other spellings—is Levi or Lévi.

The surname usually refers to a family claiming Levite descent (from the Israelite tribe of Levi), which implies a specific social status in the structure of a traditional Jewish community. A priest, which is Kohen in Hebrew, is from a subset of the Levite tribe, descended from the first high priest Aaron, the brother of Moses.

Levy can also be—though it is very rarely—a surname of French, Scottish, and Welsh origin. Variant spellings of the Scottish surname Levy are Levey, Leevy and Leavy.

== People with the surname Levy/Lévy ==
=== In arts and media ===
==== Film, television, and theatre ====
- Caissie Levy (born 1981), Canadian stage actress and singer
- Dani Levy (born 1957), Swiss filmmaker, theatrical director, and actor
- Dan Levy (Canadian actor) (born 1983), Canadian actor and TV personality; son of comedic actor Eugene Levy
- David Levy (psychologist) (born 1954), American psychologist, professor, author, and actor
- Deborah Levy (born 1959), British playwright, novelist, and poet
- Elise Minette Levy (1919–2023), American ballerina
- Eugene Levy (born 1946), Canadian actor
- Franklin R. Levy (1948–1992), American film producer
- Gabriel Levy (1881–1965), German film producer
- Hassia Levy-Agron (1923–2001), Israeli dancer
- Jane Levy (born 1989), American actress
- Jefery Levy (1958–2026), American film and television director, producer, and writer
- Mariana Levy (1966–2005), Mexican actress
- Marvin Levy (publicist) (1928–2025), American film publicist
- Paul Bern (Paul Levy, 1889–1932), German-American film director, screenwriter, and producer
- Scott Anthony Levy (born 1964), American professional wrestler better known as Raven
- Shawn Levy (born 1968), Canadian-American actor, director, and producer
- Sophie Khan Levy (born 1989), English actress
- William Levy (actor) (born 1980), Cuban-American actor

==== In literature and journalism ====
- Adrian Levy (born 1965), British journalist
- Andrea Levy (1956–2019), British author
- Bernard-Henri Lévy (born 1948), French public intellectual and journalist
- Dan Levy (journalist) (born 1978), American sports journalist
- Daniel Levy (pianist) (born 1947), Argentine classical pianist, author and broadcaster
- David Levy (chess player) (born 1945), Scottish chess International Master; writer on chess, software, and games theory
- David Levy (economist), American economist and author
- David Levy (psychologist) (born 1954), American psychologist, professor, author, actor
- David H. Levy (born 1948), Canadian astronomer and science writer
- Deborah Levy (born 1959), British playwright, novelist, and poet
- Gideon Levy (born 1953), Israeli journalist and author
- Hyman Levy (1889–1971), Scottish mathematician, author, and politician
- Moshe Levy (author) (born 1948), Iraq-born author, survivor of the Israeli destroyer Eilat
- Newman Levy (1888–1966), American lawyer and poet
- Oscar Levy (1867–1946), German physician and writer
- Paul Levy (journalist) (born 1941), American-British journalist and author
- Paul M. G. Lévy (1910–2002), Belgian journalist and professor
- Steve Levy (born 1965), ESPN anchor
- Steven Levy (born 1951), American technology writer
- William Levy (author) (1939–2019), American writer

==== In music ====
- Addie Levy, Americana mandolinist and singer, lately allied (as of November 2024) with the Brothers Comatose
- Barrington Levy (born 1964), Jamaican reggae and dancehall artist
- Dan Levy, French musician and multi-instrumentalist for The Dø
- Daniel Levy (pianist) (born 1947), Argentine classical pianist, author and broadcaster
- Émile Waldteufel (Charles Émile Lévy, 1837–1911), French composer and court pianist to the Empress Eugénie
- Fabien Lévy (born 1968), French composer
- General Levy (Paul Levy, born 1971), London-born ragga vocalist
- Hugo Chula Alexander Levy (born 1981), Thai singer-songwriter
- Jacques Levy (1935–2004), American songwriter
- James Levy, American singer, songwriter and producer, best known for song Glorious covered by The Pierces
- Joshua Levy, pianist and arranger for Big Bad Voodoo Daddy
- Kristiana Levy (born 1967), German musician, songwriter
- Lou Levy (pianist) (1928–2001), American jazz pianist and session man
- Louis Levy (1894–1957), English composer and musical director of Gaumont-British studios
- Marvin David Levy (1932–2015), American composer
- Mike Lévy (born 1985), French musician known as Gesaffelstein
- Paul Lhérie (Paul Lévy, 1844–1937), French opera singer
- Yasmin Levy (born 1975), Israeli-Spanish singer-songwriter

==== In other media ====
- Bob Levy (comedian) (born 1962), American stand-up comedian and radio personality
- Dan Levy (born 1981), American comedian
- Henri-Léopold Lévy (1840–1904), French painter
- Maya Cohen Levy (born 1955), Israeli artist
- William Alexander Levy (1909–1997), American architect and interior designer
- William Auerbach-Levy (1889–1964), Russian-American painter and artist

=== In business ===
- Daniel Levy (businessman) (born 1962), Chairman of the British football club Tottenham Hotspur
- David Levy Yulee (1810–1886), Democratic senator from Florida, industrialist and railroad entrepreneur
- David Guy Levy, president and CEO of Periscope Entertainment
- Delphine Levy (1969–2020), French manager of cultural institutions
- Florence Nightingale Levy (1870–1947), American arts administrator
- Lewis Levy (1815–1885), Australian businessman and politician
- Lou Levy (publisher) (1912–1995), American music publisher who played a key role in the careers of some of the most famous songwriters
- Morris Levy (1927–1990), American music industry executive
- Paul F. Levy, former president and CEO of Beth Israel Deaconess Medical Center
- Rami Levy, Israeli discount supermarket owner

=== In government and politics ===
==== United States ====
- Aaron J. Levy (1881–1955), New York politician and judge
- Bob Levy (New Jersey politician) (born 1947), former mayor of Atlantic City, New Jersey
- David A. Levy (born 1953), U.S. Representative from New York
- Harold O. Levy (1952–2018), American lawyer and businessman
- Meyer Levy (1887–1967), New York politician
- Murray D. Levy (1944 or 1945–2024), American politician in Maryland
- Norman J. Levy (1931–1998), American politician
- Samuel D. Levy (1860–1940), New York lawyer and judge
- Steve Levy (politician) (born 1959), American politician
- William M. Levy (1827–1882), U.S. Representative from Louisiana

==== Other countries ====
- Andrea Levy (politician) (born 1984), Spanish politician
- Anne Lévy (public health manager) (born 1971), Swiss public health manager
- Bob Levy (Canadian politician), Canadian politician and judge
- Sir Daniel Levy (politician) (1872–1937), Australian lawyer and politician
- David Levy (Israeli politician) (1937–2024), Israeli politician
- Hyman Levy (1889–1971), Scottish mathematician, author, and politician
- Ian Levy (born 1966), British politician and MP
- Jean-Pierre Lévy (born 1935), French diplomat
- R. Clifford Levy (1905–1971), Canadian politician
- Solomon Levy (1936–2016), Gibraltarian politician
- Yolette Lévy (1938–2018), Haitian-born Canadian politician and activist

=== In military ===
- André Robert Lévy (1893–1973), French World War I flying ace
- Moshe Levy (author) (born 1948), Iraq-born author, survivor of the Israeli destroyer Eilat
- Simeon Magruder Levy (1774–1807), US Army officer

=== In science and academia ===
==== In biology, medicine, and psychology ====
- Carl Edvard Marius Levy (1808–1865), Danish obstetrician
- David Levy (psychologist) (born 1954), American psychologist, professor, author, actor
- Jerre Levy (born 1938), American psychologist
- Julia Levy (born 1934), Canadian microbiologist and immunologist
- Oscar Levy (1867–1946), German physician and writer

==== In mathematics ====
- Azriel Lévy (born 1934), Israeli mathematician
- Hyman Levy (1889–1971), Scottish mathematician, author, and politician
- Paul Lévy (mathematician) (1886–1971), French mathematician
- Tony Lévy (born 1943), French historian of mathematics

==== Other academic fields ====
- Bernard-Henri Lévy (born 1948), French public intellectual and journalist
- Daniel Levy (sociologist) (born 1962), German–American political sociologist
- David Benjamin Levy (fl. 2000s), American musicologist
- David Levy (economist), American economist and author
- David C. Levy (born 1938), American educator, museum director and art historian
- David H. Levy (born 1948), Canadian astronomer and science writer
- David M. Levy, American computer scientist at the University of Washington
- Gertrude Rachel Levy (1884–1966), British author and cultural historian
- Habib Levy (1896–1984), Iranian Jewish historian
- Jacob T. Levy (born 1971), American political theorist
- Jonathan Levy, American historian
- Maurice Lévy (1922–2022), French physicist
- Moshe Levy (chemist) (1927–2015), Israeli professor of chemistry
- Paul M. G. Lévy (1910–2002), Belgian journalist and professor
- Pierre Lévy (born 1956), French philosopher, cultural theorist and media scholar
- Raphaël-Georges Lévy (1853–1933), French economist
- Richard S. Levy (1940–2021), American historian and academic
- Uriah P. Levy (1792–1862), American sailor and curator

=== In sport and games ===
- Alexander Lévy (born 1990), French golfer
- David Levy (chess player) (born 1945), Scottish chess International Master; writer on chess, software, and games theory
- David Levy (footballer) (born 1963), Israeli footballer
- DeAndre Levy (born 1987), American Detroit Lions linebacker
- Edward Lawrence Levy (1851–1932), English world champion weightlifter
- Harel Levy (born 1978), Israeli professional tennis player; highest world singles ranking # 30
- Len Levy (1921–1999), American football player and professional wrestler
- Lenny Levy (1913–1993), American Major League Baseball coach
- Marv Levy (born 1925), American and Canadian football coach
- Maximilian Levy (born 1987), German track cyclist
- Mike Levy, American pro wrestler
- Moshe Levy (athlete) (born 1952), Israeli Paralympic athlete
- Nadine Netter Levy (born 1944), American tennis player
- Raphaël Lévy (born 1981), French Magic: The Gathering player
- Ronny Levy (born 1966), Israeli football manager
- Sarah Levy (rugby union) (born 1995), American Olympic bronze medalist rugby union and rugby sevens player
- Solomon Levy (cricketer) (1886–?), English cricketer
- Syd Levy (1922–2015), South African tennis player
- Timna Nelson-Levy (born 1994), Israeli Olympic judoka
- Uriah P. Levy (1792–1862), American sailor and curator

=== In other fields ===
- Bernard Levy (died 1987), pioneer of kosher certification in the United States
- Chandra Levy (1977–2001), American murder victim
- Clifton H. Levy (1867–1962), American rabbi
- David Levy (inventor) (born c. 1967), American inventor and entrepreneur
- David L. Levy (1936–2014), American children's rights activist; Board President of Children's Rights Council
- Elias Levy (fl. c. 2000), computer security specialist
- Felix A. Levy (1884–1963), American rabbi
- Hirtzel Levy (died 1754), French martyr
- J. Leonard Levy (1865–1917), English-American rabbi
- June Rockwell Levy (1886–1971), American philanthropist
- Liza Levy, South Africa-born American Jewish community activist
- Ludwig Levy (1854–1907), German architect
- Maurice Lévy (1838–1910), French engineer
- Yvette Lévy (born 1926), French educator and Holocaust survivor

== Given name ==
- Levy Rozman
- Levy Mwanawasa
- Levy Tran
- Levy Sekgapane
- Levy Konigsburg

== See also ==
- Levy (disambiguation), includes list of people with the given name
- Levi (surname)
- Levie (disambiguation), includes list of people with name Levie
- Levin, a related name
