= Levi (surname) =

- Pronunciation: English: /ˈliːvi/ LEE-vee or /ˈlɛvi/ LEV-ee; Hebrew: [leˈvi]
- Language: Hebrew

Origin
- Meaning: Attached; joining

Other names
- Variant forms: Lévi; Levy; Lévy

Levi or Lévi is a Jewish surname. It is a transliteration of the Hebrew word לוי. Another spelling of the name is Levy (or Lévy). According to Jewish tradition, people with the surname have patrilineal descent from the Levites of the Bible. In 2019, it was revealed as the second most common surname in Israel (after Cohen).

In addition to its Jewish origins, the surname Levi also has distinct Italian origins:

- Toponymic origin: In some cases, the name is derived from the Valchiavenna region in Northern Italy. Notable examples are Father Abramo Levi and the producer Romano Levi, whose family was of Catholic (not Jewish) descent and native to this area.
- Apheretic form: It can also be an abbreviated or apheretic form of the Italian surnames Diotallevi or Allevi.

For a broader overview of the name's distribution and history, see Levi (cognome).

== Notable male people with the surname ==
- Judah HaLevi (c. 1075–1141), Spanish-Jewish physician, poet, and philosopher
- A. F. J. Levi (born 1959), British-born American physicist, engineer, academic, and professor
- Abramo Levi (1920–2007), Italian essayist and priest
- Albert William Levi (1911–1988), American philosopher
- Alexander Levi (1809–1893), French Jew; first foreigner to be naturalized in Iowa
- Beppo Levi (1875–1961), Italian mathematician
- Carlo Levi (1902–1975), Italian Jewish painter, writer, activist, politician, and doctor
- Charles Levi (born before c. 1977), American bassist of electronic industrial rock band My Life with the Thrill Kill Kult
- Charles S. Levi (1868–1939), English-American rabbi
- Claude Lévi-Strauss (1908–2009), Belgian-born French anthropologist and ethnologist
- Clemente Pugliese Levi (1855–1936), Italian painter
- Daniel Lévi (1961–2022), French singer-songwriter, composer, and pianist
- David Levi (disambiguation), several people
- Devon Levi (born 2001), Canadian AHL- and NHL player
- Doro Levi (1899–1991), Italian archaeologist
- Edward H. Levi (1911–2000), American academic leader, scholar, and statesman
- Éliphas Lévi (1810–1875), French occult author, poet, and purported magician
- Elvis Levi (born 1987), Samoan-born New Zealand professional rugby union player
- Eric Lévi (born 1955), French rock musician and film composer
- Eugenio Elia Levi (1883–1917), Italian mathematician
- Friedrich Wilhelm Levi (1888–1966), German mathematician
- Gerson Levi-Lazzaris (born 1979), Brazilian ethnoarchaeologist
- Herbert Walter Levi (1921–2014), German professor emeritus of zoology and curator of arachnologist
- Hermann Levi (1839–1900), German Jewish orchestral conductor
- Howard Levi (1916–2002), American mathematician
- Ijahman Levi (born 1946), Jamaican-British reggae musician
- Itay Levi (born 1988), Israeli musician
- Josef Levi (born 1938), American artist
- Joseph Levi (1924–2019), American businessman and politician
- Leo N. Levi (1856–1904), American lawyer and communal worker
- Leone Levi (1821–1888), Italian-born English jurist and statistician
- Mario Levi (1957–2024), Turkish novelist, journalist, and scholar
- Moshe Levi (1936–2008), Israeli military commander
- Nimrod Levi (born 1995), Israeli-Swedish ISBL player
- Paul Levi (1883–1930), German-Jewish Communist leader
- Paul Levi (picture framer) (1919–2008), German-born picture framer
- Peter Levi (1931–2000), English poet, professor of poetry, archaeologist, Jesuit priest, travel writer, biographer, academic- and prolific reviewer, and critic
- Pop Levi (born 1977), English singer, multi-instrumentalist, record producer, and filmmaker
- Primo Levi (1919–1987), Italian Jewish chemist, partisan, Holocaust survivor, and writer
- Richard Levi (born 1988), English-South African former cricketer
- Romano Levi (1928–2008), Italian craftsman and grappa producer
- Tullio Levi-Civita (1873–1941), Italian mathematician
- Virgilio Levi (1929–2002), Italian Catholic priest, journalist, and writer
- Ya'akov Levi (born 1964), Israeli former Olympic gymnast
- Yehuda Levi (born 1979), Israeli actor, model, singer, and television host
- Yinon Levi, Israeli settler and murderer
- Yishai Levi (1963–2026), Israeli singer
- Yoel Levi (born 1950), Romanian-born Israeli musician and conductor
- Yohanan Levi (1901–1945), German-born Hebrew linguist and historian
- Zachary Levi (born 1980), American actor

== Notable female people with the surname ==
- Alda Levi (1890–1950), Italian archaeologist and art historian
- Kate Everest Levi (1859–1938), American Jewish educator, writer, lawyer, and social worker
- Lauren 'London' Levi-Nance, American contestant on America's Next Top Model season 12
- Rita Levi-Montalcini (1909–2012), Italian neurobiologist
- Sara Levi-Tanai (c. 1910–2005), Israeli choreographer and song writer; founder and artistic director of the Inbal Dance Theatre

== Notable people with the middle name ==
- Graciela Levi Castillo (1926–2014), Ecuadorian journalist and writer

== Fictional characters ==
- Asher Levi, in the UK Internet soap opera EastEnders: E20, played by Heshima Thompson
- Dolly Gallagher Levi, in the 1938 play The Merchant of Yonkers, played by Barbra Streisand in the 1969 US musical romantic comedy film Hello, Dolly!

== See also ==
- Levy (surname)
- Loevy (Hebrew: לוי)
