= Lévai =

Hungarian toponymic surname

Lévai (also spelled Lévay; unaccented forms Levai and Levay) is a Hungarian toponymic surname with a significant historical association with Ashkenazi Jewish families. During the 19th and early 20th centuries, it became one of the surnames adopted by Hungarian Jews through Magyarization of family names. Historical name-change records document numerous instances of its adoption in place of surnames including Levi, Lévi, Löwy, Löwi, Löbl and Löwenstein.

== Etymology ==
The Hungarian suffix -i indicates a connection with a place of origin, residence or landholding. The name Léva is best known as the Hungarian name of Levice, now in Slovakia. Onomastic scholar Mihály Hajdú identifies settlements called Léva in the historical counties of Bars, Trencsén and Valkó as possible sources of the surname. The Visegrád surname dictionary lists Lévay as a spelling variant of Lévai.

== Hungarian Jewish use ==
Hajdú records that many bearers of Levi, Lévi, Löwi, Löbl and other surnames adopted Lévai in the nineteenth century. In a study of birth registers from four Hungarian Jewish communities, historian Kinga Frojimovics found that Lévi and variants such as Lőwy, Lövy and Lövi were among the most frequent surnames of Hebrew origin in the registers she examined. The association between Lévai and Levi or Levy in these many cases reflects the adoption of a Hungarian surname. Tamás Farkas notes that the surnames adopted by Hungarian Jews often overlapped with those used by surrounding Hungarians.

=== Examples from the Great Hungarian Plain ===
Zoltán Szentiványi's 1895 compilation of authorized name changes lists József Levi and his children in Szentes among those who took the surname Lévai in 1882. It also records changes to Lévai from Löwi, Lövy and Löwy. The Családnév index lists two later changes from Lévi to Lévai: Miksa Lévi in Mezőtúr in 1910 and Jakab Lévi in Túrkeve in 1912.

The name also appears in Jewish community records from the southern Great Plain. The Jewish martyrs' list from Hódmezővásárhely records Géza and Pál Lévai, and a 1942 community list records Zoltán Lévai. The Jewish congregation's 1942 voting roll in Szeged lists Ferenc, Henrik, Miklós and Vilmos Lévai. The Holocaust Memorial Center records the married name Lévai for Katalin Klein, whose last recorded residence was Szolnok.

== Notable people with the surname ==
- András Lévai, multiple people
- Anikó Lévai (born 1963), wife of Viktor Orbán
- Henrik Lévay (1826–1901), Hungarian economist
- Imre Róbert Lévai (born 1973), Hungarian attorney, engineer
- István Lévai (born 1957), Hungarian boxer
- Ivan Levaï (born 1937), Hungarian-French journalist
- Jenő Lévai (1892–1983), Hungarian journalist and writer
- Katalin Lévai (born 1954), Hungarian politician
- Lajos Lévai (1853–1908), printer and publisher in Óbecse who previously used the surname Löwy or Lövy
- Lajos Lévay (born 1865), Hungarian politician and member of parliament
- Levente Lévai (born 2005), Hungarian wrestler
- Nick Levay (1977–2021), American computer security expert
- Péter Lévai (born 1962), Hungarian physicist
- Sándor Lévai (1935–2009), Hungarian speedway rider
- Sylvester Levay (born 1945), Hungarian composer
- Tamás Lévai (born 1999), Hungarian wrestler
- Vivien Lévai (born 1992), Hungarian volleyball player
- Zoltán Lévai (born 1996), Hungarian wrestler
- Zsolt Lévai (born 1965), Hungarian rower

== See also ==
- Levi (surname)
- Levy (surname)
- Lévay József Református Gimnázium és Diákotthon, a school in Hungary
