= David Levy =

David Levy may refer to:

- David A. Levy (born 1953), American politician
- David Benjamin Levy (fl. 2000s), American musicologist
- David H. Levy (born 1948), Canadian astronomer and science writer
- David Levy Yulee (1810–1886), American politician and attorney
- David L. Levy (1936–2014), children's rights activist
- David Levy (chess player) (born 1945), British chess player
- David Levy (historian) (born 1937), American historian
- David Levy (inventor) (born c. 1962), American inventor
- David Levy (Israeli politician) (1937–2024), Israeli politician
- David Levy (psychologist) (born 1954), American psychologist, author, actor
- David Levy (footballer) (born 1963), Israeli footballer
- David Levy (economist), American economist and author
- David Guy Levy, president and CEO of Periscope Entertainment
- David Levy, former CEO of the Brooklyn Nets and former president of the Turner Broadcasting System
- David M. Levy, American computer scientist
- David C. Levy (born 1938), museum director
- David Levy, creator and executive producer of The Addams Family (1964 TV series)

== See also ==
- Dave Levey, a winner of the American version of Hell's Kitchen
- David Levi (disambiguation)
