= Shervin Mirhashemi =

American sports executive

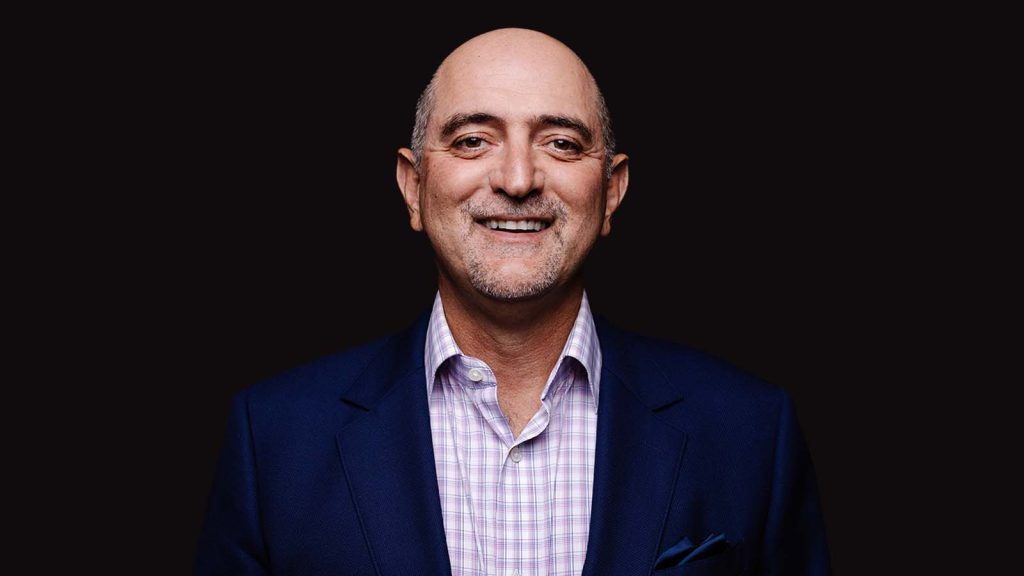
- Born: 1969 (age 56–57)
- Education: University of Southern California; University of California San Diego
- Occupation: Sports executive
- Board member of: Legends Board of Directors; Legends for Charity; St. Jude Children’s Research Hospital
- Website: https://www.legends.net/about/shervin-mirhashemi-president-and-ceo

Shervin Mirhashemi (born 1969) is an American sports executive who has been the president and chief executive officer (CEO) of Legends Hospitality since 2016. Legends Hospitality was founded by Dallas Cowboys owner Jerry Jones, and the New York Yankees.

== Early life and education ==
Born in 1969, Mirhashemi attended Miraleste High School in Palos Verdes, California, and later earned a B.A. in biomedical engineering from University of California San Diego and a J.D. from the University of Southern California.

== Career ==
Mirhashemi joined Legends as president and chief operating officer (COO) in 2013. In 2016, Mirhashemi was appointed as the CEO and is now part of the Legends Hospitality Board of Directors.

Under Mirhashemi's tenure, Legends has grown its services and established four new divisions: Global Merchandise, Global Partnerships, Global Technology, and Growth Enterprises. It also managed merchandising and concessions at the $5 billion SoFi Stadium, successfully negotiated its annual $30 million naming-rights agreement, and oversaw the development of the neighboring 300-acre Hollywood Park entertainment district. Additionally, it also secured the naming-rights deal for Allegiant Stadium and managed the Raiders' seat-license campaign, raising $549 million ahead of the 2020 season.

Legends also expanded internationally, representing Real Madrid, FC Barcelona, Manchester City F.C., Rugby World Cup 2023, UFC, The European Tour and Ryder Cup, among others.

In January 2021, Legends announced a majority investment from Sixth Street, a global investment firm with over $50 billion in assets under management, that valued Legends at $1.3 billion USD.
