= Giorgio Perlasca =

Italian businessman (1910–1992)

- Born: 31 January 1910; Como, Italy
- Died: 15 August 1992 (aged 82); Padua, Italy
- Occupations: Businessman, diplomat
- Known for: Saving 5,218 Jews from deportation during the Holocaust
- Awards: Righteous Among the Nations (1989); Order of Merit of the Italian Republic (1991)

Giorgio Perlasca (31 January 1910 – 15 August 1992) was an Italian businessman. With the collaboration of official diplomats, he posed as the Spanish consul-general to Hungary in the winter of 1944, and saved 5,218 Jews from deportation to Nazi extermination camps in eastern Europe. In 1989, Perlasca was designated by Israel as a Righteous Among the Nations.

== Early life ==
Perlasca was born in Como and grew up in Maserà, province of Padua, Italy. During the 1920s, he became a supporter of Italian Fascism, fighting in East Africa during the Second Italo-Abyssinian War, and in the Spanish Civil War for the Nationalist Corpo Truppe Volontarie. As a gratitude safe conduct for his service in Spain, he was awarded a diplomatic mission from Francisco Franco.

Perlasca grew disillusioned with fascism, in particular, due to Benito Mussolini's alliance with Nazism and adoption of Italian racial laws that came into force in 1938.

== In World War II ==
During the initial phase of World War II, he worked at procuring supplies for the Italian Army in the Balkans. He was later appointed as an official delegate of the Italian government with diplomatic status and sent to Eastern Europe with the mission of buying meat for the Italian army fighting on the Russian front. On 8 September 1943, Italy surrendered to the Allies. Italians had to choose whether to join Mussolini's newly formed Italian Social Republic, which was fascist, or stay loyal to the King and join the Allied side. Perlasca chose the latter.

In Budapest, he was arrested and confined to a castle reserved for diplomats. After a few months, he used a medical pass that allowed him to travel within Hungary and requested political asylum at the Spanish Embassy. He took advantage of his status as a veteran of the Spanish war, adopted the first name of "Jorge" and, since Spain was neutral in the war, he became a free man.

Perlasca worked with the Spanish Chargé d'Affaires, Ángel Sanz Briz, and other diplomats of neutral states to smuggle Jews out of Hungary. The system he devised consisted of furnishing "protection cards" which placed Jews under the guardianship of various neutral states. He helped Jews find refuge in protected houses under the control of various embassies, which had extraterritorial conventions that gave them an equivalent to sovereignty. They could provide asylum for Jews.

When Sanz Briz left Hungary at night in November 1944, he did not tell Perlasca that he was going to leave, and Perlasca chose to remain in Hungary. The Hungarian government ordered the Spanish Embassy building and the extraterritorial houses where the Jews took refuge to be cleared out. Perlasca immediately made the false announcement that Sanz Briz was due to return from a short leave, and that he had been appointed as chargé d'affaires for the meantime. Throughout the winter, Perlasca was active in hiding, shielding and feeding thousands of Jews in Budapest. He continued issuing safe conduct passes as initiated by the Spanish government, on the basis of a Spanish decree passed 20 December 1924 that granted citizenship to Jews of Sephardic origin (descendants of Iberian Jews expelled from Spain in the late 15th century), but it had been cancelled in 1930, a fact the Hungarian authorities were not aware of.

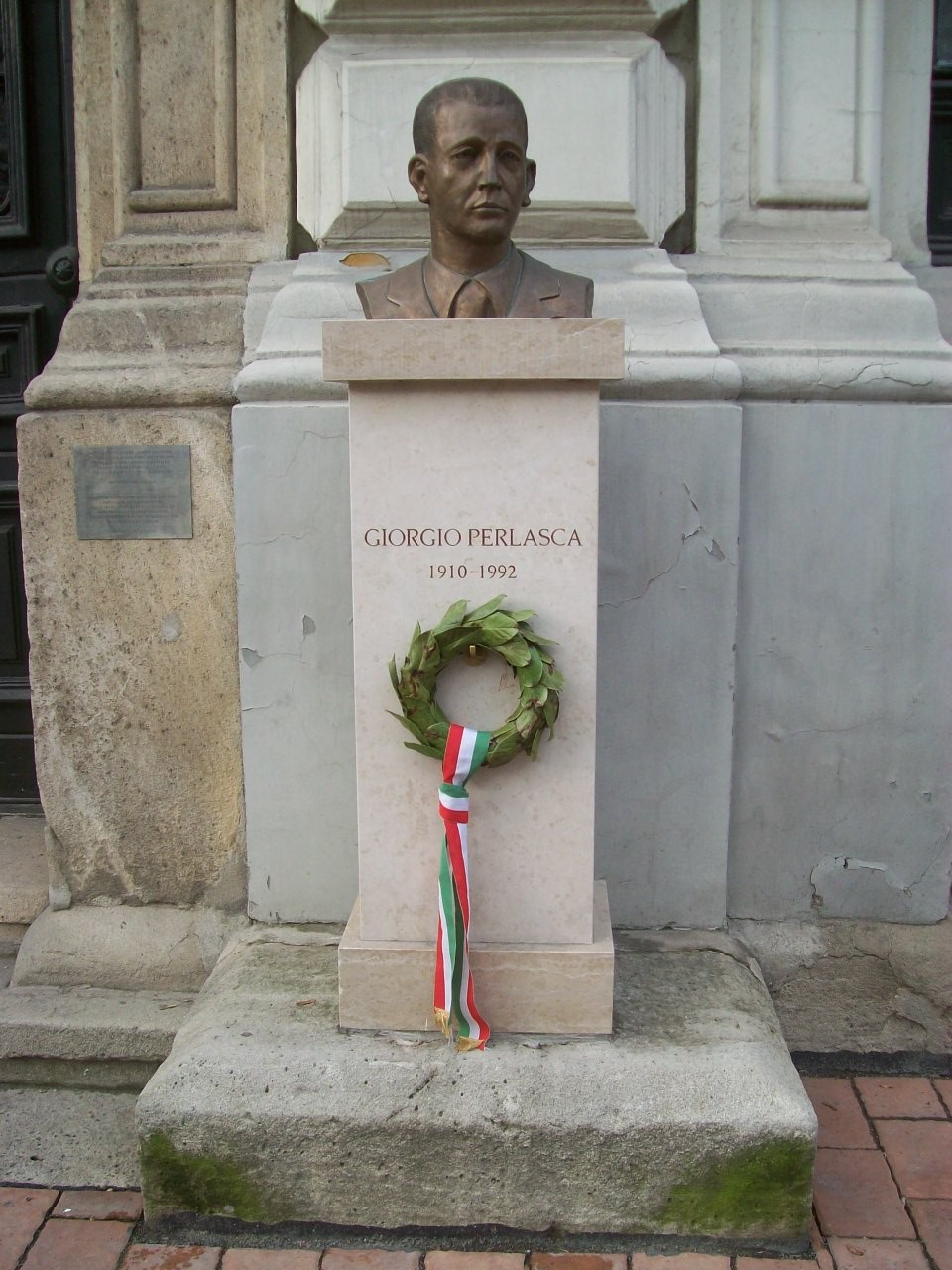
Perlasca bust in Budapest

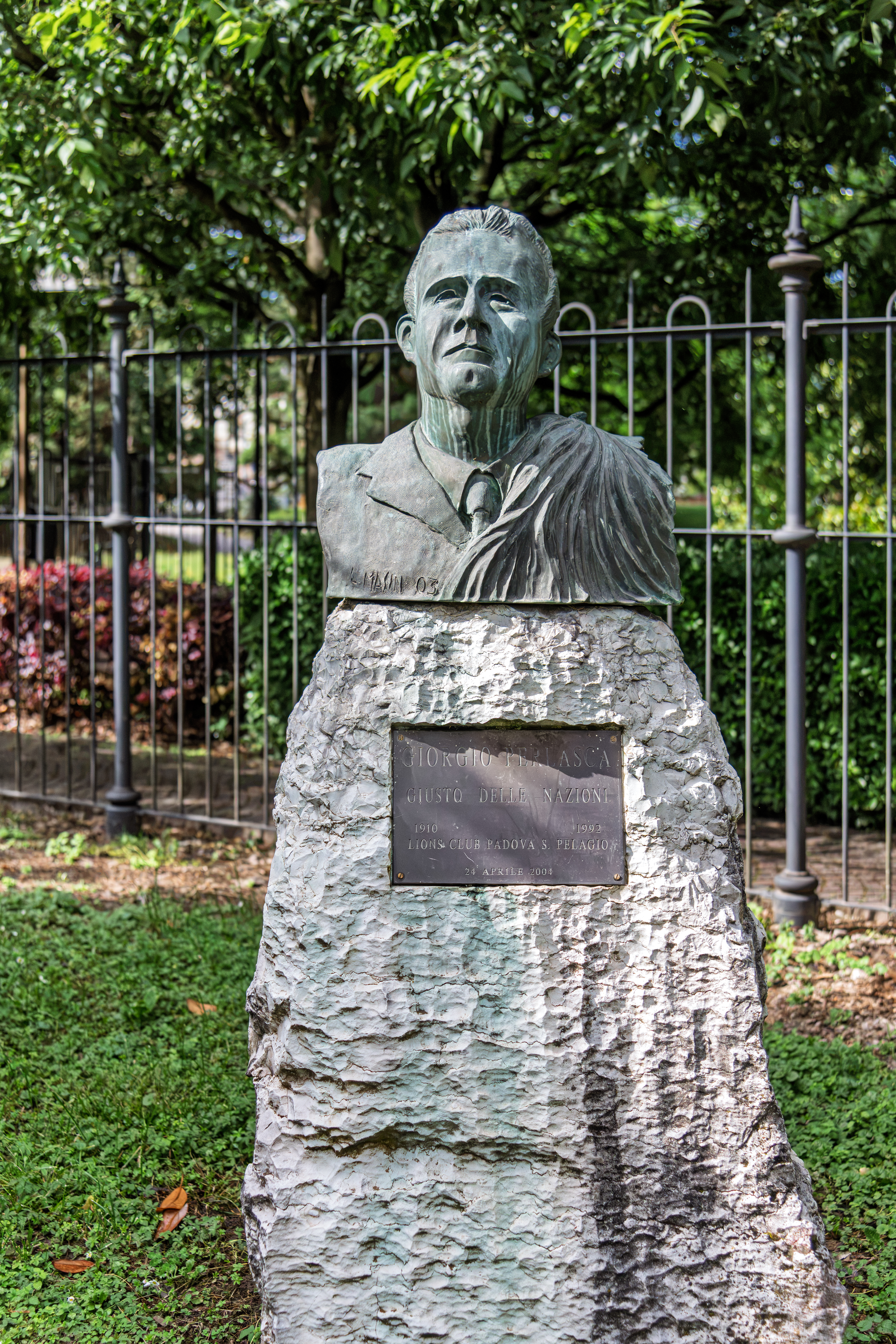
Perlasca bust in Padova

In December 1944, Perlasca rescued two boys from being herded onto a freight train in defiance of a German lieutenant colonel on the scene. The Swedish diplomat-rescuer Raoul Wallenberg, also present there, later told Perlasca that the officer who had challenged him was Adolf Eichmann. Over 45 days, from 1 December 1944 to 16 January 1945, Perlasca helped save more than 5,000 Jews.

According to Perlasca, he also prevented the execution of a plan to raze the Budapest Ghetto with around 60,000 people in it, as the Nazis had done in Warsaw. While Perlasca was posing as the Spanish consul-general, he learned of the intentions of the SS and the far-right Hungarian Arrow Cross to destroy the ghetto. He asked for a direct hearing with the Hungarian interior minister, Gábor Vajna, and threatened him with legal and economic measures against the "3,000 Hungarian citizens" (in fact, a much smaller number) declared by Perlasca as residents of Spain, unless Vajna withdrew the plan. After this episode, the plan to raze the Budapest Ghetto was cancelled.

== After the war ==
After the war, Perlasca managed to return to Italy only in August 1945. On 5 June 1945, while still in Istanbul, he delivered a first brief report on his activity to the Spanish consul general in Turkey, in order to prevent any legal charges for his actions on behalf of the Spanish embassy. Back home, Perlasca drew up a detailed memorandum of the events, dated 13 October 1945, and sent it to the Spanish foreign minister in Madrid and to the Italian government, keeping a copy for himself. He also wrote to Sanz Briz, the ambassador whom he had replaced in Budapest, who laconically replied, warning Perlasca not to expect recognition for his work.

Perlasca did not tell his story publicly or even to his family, but rather turned to those he considered might be the only appropriate recipients. The few institutional bodies to which he wrote, however, ignored him for diplomatic and political reasons or due to a simple lack of interest. Even the Jewish historian Jenő Lévai, who asked for a copy of Perlasca's memorandum in 1946 and then contributed to spreading his name, omitted to tell Perlasca's story in his Black Book, presumably for political reasons. Back home, Perlasca was also asked to pay with his own money for an expensive car (a Fiat 500 "Topolino"), which he had rented during the rescue of the Jews and had been destroyed in the Soviet siege of Budapest; Perlasca later struggled to make ends meet.

Only in 1961, on the occasion of the media clamor around the Eichmann trial, did il Resto del Carlino newspaper publish a first article by Giuseppe Cerato that told Perlasca's story, without resonance; the same happened with an article by Furio Colombo published in the end of the 1960s on La Stampa.

Perlasca never yearned for fame or explicitly hid his story; he simply told it to those he thought might be the appropriate recipient, and then lived his life. Only in 1980 did Perlasca's family learn of the memorandum he drafted, after Perlasca had a stroke, when he decided to talk about it to his closest relatives, but he continued to keep it private once he recovered. The family eventually learned of the contents of the memorandum in 1987, when the story became public.

In 1987, a group of Hungarian Jews whom Perlasca had saved finally found him after searching for him for 42 years in Spain. There was wide publicity at the time over the event, and Perlasca became noted for his heroic deeds. Enrico Deaglio wrote an account of his remarkable heroism, Banality of Goodness (2002), which became a bestseller. The book was adapted as a made-for-TV film, Perlasca – Un eroe Italiano (2005), by the RAI national television corporation, not to be confused with the 1993 movie Perlasca. In 1989, Perlasca was awarded by the Hungarian parliament in its plenary session with the highest national honour. The following year, Perlasca received acclaim in the United States and was welcomed by dozens of journalists and some survivors (Eva Lang, Avrham Ronai) in Washington, when the Holocaust Museum awarded him as Righteous Among the Nations.

In October 1991, Perlasca was awarded the title Grand Ufficiale of the Italian Republic; the Senate approved the grant of a life pension for notable Italian senior citizens in financial difficulty (via the Bacchelli law), but Perlasca declined the grant.

Perlasca died of a heart attack in Padua on 15 August 1992.

== Decorations and honours ==
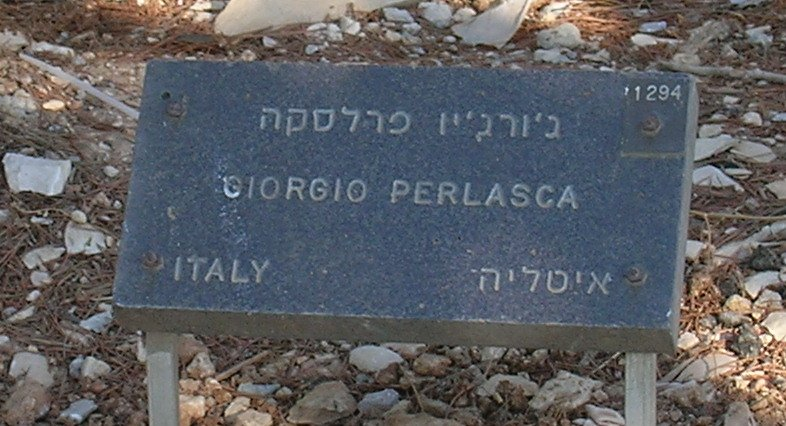
Stele dedicated to Giorgio Perlasca at Yad Vashem Museum in Jerusalem.

- In 1987, Perlasca was made an honorary citizen of Israel and was honoured by the Yad Vashem Holocaust Memorial Museum with a stele and a 10,000-tree forest.
- Perlasca was designated by Yad Vashem as Righteous Among the Nations in 1989
- Star of Merit, Hungary, 1989
- Knesset Medal, Israel, 1989
- Town Seal of Padova, Italy, 1989
- Wallenberg Medal, United States, 1990
- Medal of Remembrance of the United States Holocaust Memorial Council, USA, 1990
- Invitation to lay the first stone of the Holocaust Museum in Washington, USA, 1990
- Knight Grand Cross, Spain, 1991
- 1st Class, Knight Grand Cross (Italy), 1991
- Gold Medal for Civil Bravery (Italy), 1992
- A bust of Perlasca was created in Budapest.
- As part of its Righteous Among the Nations project, the Raanana Symphonette Orchestra commissioned an original orchestral piece, "His Finest Hour", from composer Moshe Zorman in tribute to Perlasca. The piece premiered 10 December 2014 in Raanana in the presence of Perlasca's son Franco and daughter-in-law Luciana Amadia.

=== Places ===
- Inside Raoul Wallenberg Memorial Garden (Dohàny street 2)
- Giorgio Perlasca Kereskedelmi, Vendéglátóipari Szakközépiskola és Szakiskola (Giorgio Perlasca Highschool)

=== Movies ===
- Perlasca – Un eroe Italiano (2005)
- El ángel de Budapest

=== Songs ===
- Sandy Cash: Giorgio Perlasca
- David Ben Reuven: The Rescuers

=== Stamps ===
- Italian stamp of 2010
- Israeli stamp of 1998

=== Books ===
- Silvia del Francia & Luca Cognolato, L'eroe invisible, ISBN 978-958-30-6345-9
- Giorgio Perlasca, L'impostore, 2007, Il Mulino. ISBN 9788815060891 (Perlasca's memorial, published posthumously)
- Enrico Deaglio, La banalità del bene. Storia di Giorgio Perlasca, 1991, Feltrinelli. ISBN 9788807070242
