= Corey Stern =

American lawyer

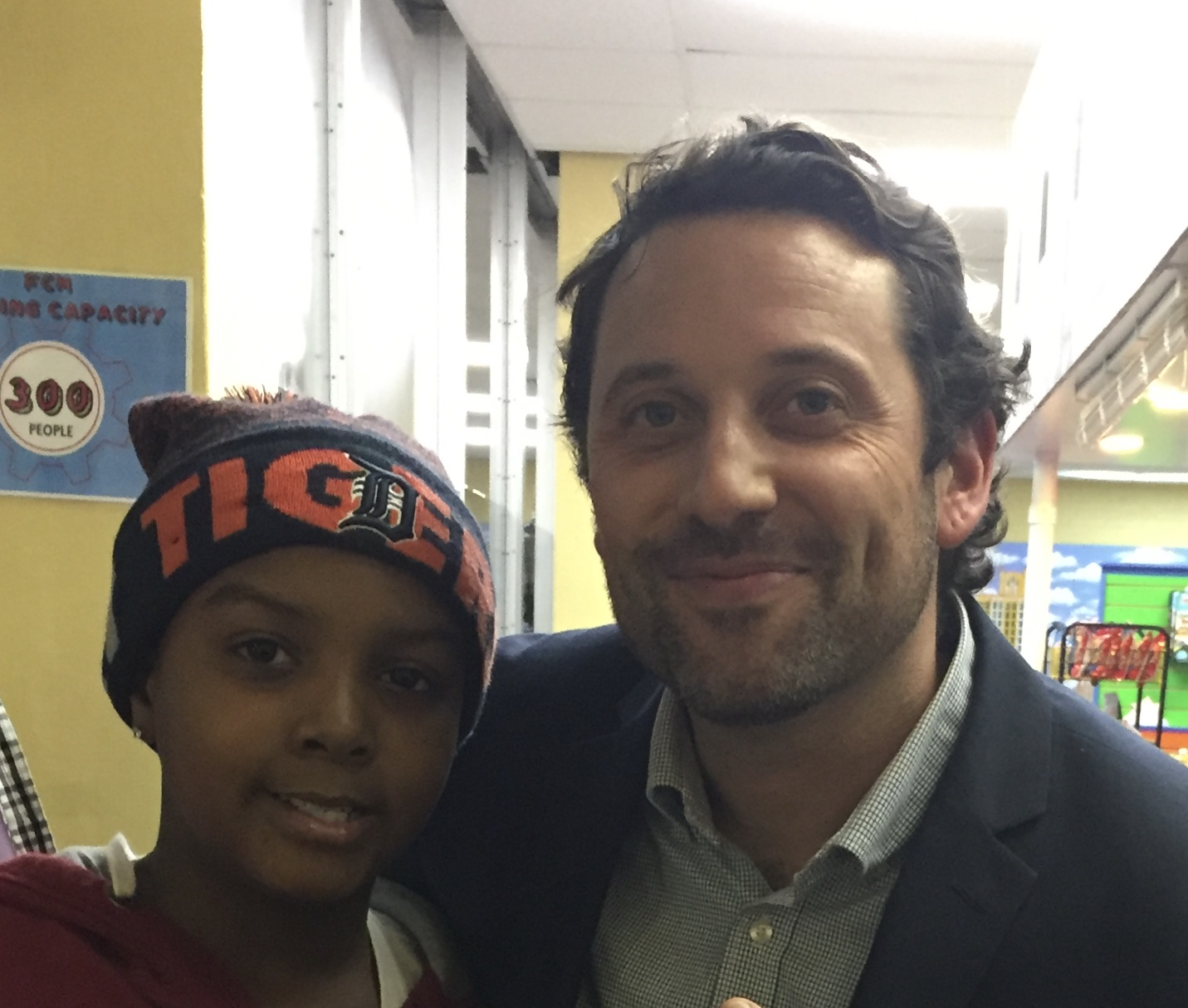
- Occupation: Lawyer

Corey Stern is an American lawyer, known for representing children and their families in lead-poisoning and sex abuse lawsuits.

== Career ==
Working as a partner at Levy Konigsberg LLP, Stern filed cases against the City of Flint, State of Michigan, and several private entities in 2016 during the Flint Water Crisis. Starting with around a hundred cases, after being appointed Lead Counsel in the Genesee County Litigation by Circuit Court Chief Judge Richard Yuille, the number of cases filed quickly grew, with the total children he has represented expanding to in excess of 2500. The lawsuits also named three employees of the local water authority. Stern has represented over one hundred children, individually, against the New York City Housing Authority (“NYCHA”) in lead-poisoning cases; the poisonings occurred as a result of lead paint hazards in the buildings maintained by the authority. In 2017, Stern filed a Federal class action lawsuit against NYCHA and New York City Mayor Bill de Blasio, alleging violations of residents’ constitutional rights.

In 2019, Stern filed a class action suit in the U.S. District Court for the Southern District of New York representing sexual assault victims of Dr. Reginald Archibald during his employment at The Rockefeller University. The lawsuit filed by Jeffrey Poppel, a former patient, alleges that during his four decades as a pediatric endocrinologist at Rockefeller, Dr. Reginald Archibald had more than 9,000 patients, many of whom were boys who were unable to grow normally. The New York Times spoke with 17 people, most of them men, who said they were abused by Dr. Archibald when they were young boys or adolescents.

He has previously worked with lead-poisoning cases in the State of Georgia. In 2016, Stern secured a $2.5 million judgment from New York City, the property owner, after lead paint caused lead-poisoning in a child resident.

== Flint Water Litigation & Settlement ==
Stern is known for spearheading litigation over the Flint Water Crisis, in which he represented thousands of plaintiffs, including more than 2,500 children, who were exposed to lead, legionella, and other contaminants in the City of Flint's municipal water supply system.

Stern became aware of the case in late 2015 when he received a phone call from a woman in a homeless shelter in Michigan. Though initially hesitant of the claims and not yet licensed to practice law in Michigan, he returned the woman's call after researching the issue and receiving encouragement from his wife and secretary. Being experienced in lead poisoning litigation, he knew even low levels of lead exposure in children could lead to lifelong deficits.

In January 2016, he attended a town hall hosted by Rachel Maddow that drew thousands of Flint residents, prominent community organizers, and local leaders. The town hall was televised nationally and served as motivation for Stern to work the case. He began traveling weekly from New York to Flint to speak with residents and community members and his number of clients grew.

On November 15, 2016, Circuit Court Chief Judge Richard Yuille appointed Stern as Lead Counsel in the Court's first Case Management Order governing the Flint Water Litigation. The Order applied to all plaintiffs maintaining claims in Genesee County Circuit Court for personal injuries and losses resulting from the Flint Water Crisis.

On July 27, 2017, Stern was appointed Liaison Counsel in U.S. District Court for the Eastern District of Michigan for all individual personal injury and property damage cases arising from the Crisis. The Court renewed the appointment in 2018, 2019, and 2020.

On August 12, 2020, following years of litigation and 18 months of court-supervised negotiations, Stern signed a $600 settlement agreement with the State of Michigan, the largest settlement in state history. As an architect of the settlement, Stern advocated for children by insisting most of the settlement be paid to plaintiffs ages six and younger.

On November 10, 2021, U.S. District Judge Judith Levy issued final approval of the $626 million partial settlement. Per settlement terms, nearly 80% of money paid through a court-monitored victims compensation fund was dedicated to plaintiffs who were younger than 18 at the time of the crisis, with children 6 years old and younger receiving the largest share. The settlement also required $35 million to be set aside for “future minor claimants” who had not yet filed claims. The state of Michigan and other defendants associated with state agencies would be responsible for approximately $600 million, while the remaining portion of the settlement would be paid by the city of Flint and its associated defendants, McLaren Healthcare and Row Professional Services Company.

Stern continues to represent plaintiffs in ongoing litigation against private companies involved in Flint's switch from Lake Huron to the Flint River for its source of drinking water. This includes serving as counsel for children in the first bellwether trials against private engineering firms Veolia North America (VNA) and Lockwood, Andrews & Newnam (LAN), which were hired as consultants on Flint's water system.

== Jackson, MS Water Contamination ==
Stern is serving a leading role in a federal lawsuit filed in October 2021 against the city of Jackson, Mississippi over claims that hundreds of children were exposed to lead after officials disregarded warnings about water safety, corrosion, and unsafe levels of lead in its water supply for more than six years. Stern and his firm represent more than 1000 children in the ongoing Jackson litigation.

In September 2022, Stern provided an update on the litigation, stating that the same mismanaged and underfunded water system which led to the Jackson Water Crisis and subsequent federal emergency declaration also contributed to children being exposed to contaminated water for years on end. He stated that counsel is continuing to research and study the problems in Jackson, and that there is potential for a resolution of the cases in the future.
