= Daniel Levy =

Daniel or Dan Levy may refer to:

== Arts ==
- Daniel Levy (pianist) (born 1947), Argentine classical pianist, author and broadcaster
- Dan Levy (Canadian actor) (born 1983), Canadian actor and television personality
- Dan Levy (American comedian) (born 1981), American comedian
- Dan Levy, American musician, film score composer, and former member of The Dø

== Sports ==
- Daniel Levy (basketball) (1930–2020), Israeli Olympic basketball player
- Daniel Levy (businessman) (born 1962), former chairman of the English football club Tottenham Hotspur
- Dan Levy (journalist) (born 1978), American sports journalist

== Others ==
- Sir Daniel Levy (politician) (1872–1937), Australian lawyer and politician
- Daniel Levy (sociologist) (born 1962), German-American sociology professor, specialist in memory studies
- Daniel Levy (physician), American cardiologist
- Daniel Levy (political analyst), British-Israeli Middle East analyst and author

== See also ==
- Dani Levy (born 1957), Swiss filmmaker, theatrical director and actor
- Daniel Levey (c. 1875–?), infamous swindler in the early 20th century
- Daniel Levi (disambiguation)
