= Perlasca – Un eroe Italiano =

2002 Italian television film

- Based on: La banalità del bene by Enrico Deaglio
- Written by: Enrico Deaglio, Sandro Petraglia
- Screenplay by: Sandro Petraglia, Stefano Rulli
- Directed by: Alberto Negrin
- Starring: Luca Zingaretti
- Theme music composer: Ennio Morricone
- Country of origin: Italy
- Original language: Italian

Production
- Cinematography: Stefano Ricciotti
- Editor: Antonio Siciliano
- Running time: 200 minutes
- Production companies: Rai Fiction, Focusfilm Kft.

Original release
- Network: Rai 1
- Release: 28 January 2002

Perlasca – Un eroe Italiano (English: Perlasca, an Italian Hero also known as Perlasca, The Courage of a Just Man) is a 2002 Italian drama, directed by Alberto Negrin, about Giorgio Perlasca, an Italian businessman working in Hungary for his government. After the surrender of Italy to the Allies, he took refuge in the Spanish embassy. Aware of the threat to Jews, he first began to help them find shelter in Spanish safe houses.

After the Spanish ambassador moved to Switzerland, Perlasca posed as the Spanish consul, tricking Nazi officials and saving the lives of more than 5,000 Jews in Hungary in 1944 during the Holocaust. The film was made by Rai Uno and aired as a two-part TV film.

== Background ==
The movie is adapted from the book, La banalità del bene – Storia di Giorgio Perlasca (2002) by Enrico Deaglio, about the achievements of an Italian man in saving Jews in Hungary in 1944. During World War II, Perlasca (a former fascist who changed his opinion about fascism) worked at procuring supplies for the Italian army in the Balkans. In the autumn of 1943, he was appointed as an official delegate of the Italian government with diplomatic status and sent to eastern Europe with the mission of buying meat for the Italian army. On 8 September Italy surrendered unconditionally to the Allied forces. Italian citizens in Hungary were then considered the enemy of the Hungarian Government, which was allied with Germany, and were at risk of arrest and internment. During this period, the Hungarians had forced Jews of Budapest into a ghetto, and they began deporting them to Nazi death camps, even as the Russians advanced on the eastern front.

Some of the film's scenes feature other historical persons. For instance, Perlasca rescued two children from deportation and certain death while observed by Adolf Eichmann, who was in Hungary overseeing deportation of Jews to concentration and death camps. The film refers to Raoul Wallenberg, a Swedish diplomat who issued papers to protect tens of thousands of Jews.

After the war, Perlasca returned to his home in Padua. In post-war Italy Perlasca didn't speak of his efforts to nobody, not even his family, he lived an humble life and his story was unknown until 1987, when the people he saved found him after 42 years of searching him in Spain.

== Plot ==
The film starts in a Budapest Hotel with a narrative introduction by Perlasca. His chambermaid warns him of a raid of Hungarian Arrow Cross storm troopers coming to arrest him. He escapes and manages gets to the railway station, where he tries to sneak onto a sheep transport wagon. Discovered by a local officer named Glückmar he is arrested (as Italy has surrendered to the Allies, Italian citizens in Hungary are considered enemies). While he is being taken away, an Allied air strike hits the station and Perlasca escapes.

He goes to an upper-class party to get information from Contessa Eleonora about Resistance members who can help him leave the country. Another squad of troopers, led by Captain Bleiber, arrive on the scene and arrest some guests, including Italian military officers. The contessa uses her Hungarian social rank to get Perlasca out safely and sends him to Professor Balázs, a doctor. Perlasca finds he is sheltering Jews who have left the ghetto, at a time when they are being deported to Nazi death camps.

Perlasca spends the night at his clinic, but the place is investigated by Bleiber and his Lieut. Nagy. Escaping the immediate threat, the Jews leave the house in fear and most are caught and killed by Bleiber and his forces, who had been waiting outside. Perlasca survives with Magda, a young Jewish woman, and her daughter Lili. They reach the Spanish Embassy where, thanks to a safe-passage letter signed by Francisco Franco, he gains an audience with the ambassador Sanz Briz. He sends them to a Spanish safe house, protected by embassy sovereignty. They are accompanied by a local Hungarian Jewish lawyer working for the embassy.

At the safe house, Perlasca meets more refugees from the clinic, and Eva and Sándor, a Jewish couple. He helps get groups to collaborate within the house. He and the lawyer leave the house for a drink but upon his return he recognizes that the house was indeed cleaned up illegally by the Arrow Cross soldiers. He begins searching for Magda first in the railway station where the fascists have already started to gather and load the Jews to wagons ready to roll out.

For the second time, he confronts Glückmar, who helps him. Perlasca is sent to the SS-Führer of the station who is easily bribed and thus lets him compile a list of Jews needed by the Spanish Embassy. He cheats with the list and actually calls more people to his truck than it is permitted, except Magda, who isn't on the train. He then visits an Arrow Cross Interrogation base, where he finds a lot of executed Jews but saves those few who survived the torture with Magda among them. Returning to the Embassy, Briz tells him that the Spanish are withdrawing from Hungary and ceasing to operate. This is the point where Perlasca decides to take on the role of a so-called consul and to lie, saying he is of Spanish nationality and have others call him "Jorge". He refuses to let the Arrow troopers in and acts as if the Embassy is still functioning and is therefore sovereign territory. He organizes education, alert duty and supplies within these buildings. He visits Gábor Vajna, the Arrow Cross Interior Minister of Hungary as consul and claims that the Jews housed by the Spanish are Sephardi Jews. Meanwhile, Lt. Nagy – according to the local rules – forces the protected Jews to the streets to clear debris caused by air raids. He then attempts to escort the group to the railway station for deportation, but is stopped again by a dispatch reporting Perlasca's and Vajna's agreement. Then comes the aforementioned encounter with Adolf Eichmann where Perlasca saves the lives of two siblings. He then falsifies 5000 'Schutzbriefs' (protection letters) when he is informed of his own Spanish passport waiting for him at the Hungarian border. He still chooses to stay because Magda's life is in danger. A final raid on the safehouse results in Nagy taking all the Jews (except a half dozen of them who remain in hiding) to the Danube bank, while Perlasca is attending a ball where he tries to borrow a train-wagon for his protégés to be sent to Switzerland. While running away from the safehouse, Magda's father is shot on sight by a young militiaman, who tries to test him by asking him to recite the prayer, "Our father, who art in ... ". As a Jew he cannot do so, and the soldier yells, "Where is our father?" When Sándor responds, "I don't know where he is," he is shot immediately. Perlasca and the few remained Jews find shelter at Professor Balázs' flat. At the Danube River, the 1944/45 Danube executions take place and despite recruiting aid from Major Glückmer, Perlasca arrives too late to the scene. He manages to save only Eva. Upon hearing the news of plans to burn down the Budapest ghetto and its inhabitants, he decides to convince the Jewish community to take up arms and to fight if necessary. He also makes his final visit to Vajna's office and, with a successful bluff, he convinces him to let the ghetto stand and thus be freed by the Red Army days later. In the final scenes, Cpt. Bleiber is seen hanged in the street and Perlasca leaves the city with the help of Glückmer, who was originally ordered to arrest him because of his previous fascist affiliations.

== Cast ==
=== Main ===
- Luca Zingaretti as Giorgio Perlasca, an Italian veteran and businessman who saves the lives of over 5,200 Jews by bribing and outsmarting officials. He uses Italian government funds intended for his purchase of cattle to feed Italian troops.
- Géza Tordy as Ángel Sanz Briz, the ambassador of Spain in Hungary
- Jérôme Anger as lawyer Farkas, counsel to Briz, who became Perlasca's accomplice
- Giuliana Lojodice as Mme Tournè, secretary to the ambassador; she helps create and issue 'Schutzbriefs' (protection letters)
- Mathilda May as Contessa Eleonora, the wife of a Hungarian high officer assigned to the Soviet Union
- György Cserhalmi as SS captain Bleiber, the main antagonist; he follows orders in persecuting deserters, Jews and opposition members
- Amanda Sandrelli as Magda, whose cause Perlasca takes on
- Christiane Filangieri as Eva, a Jewish bride
- Marco Bonini as Sándor, Eva's fiancé
- Dezső Garas as the Rabbi of the Budapest Ghetto
- Jean-François Garreaud as Professor Balázs

=== Secondary ===
- Zoltán Bezerédi as Gábor Vajna, the Arrow Cross Interior Minister of Hungary
- Ferenc Borbiczky as Major Glückmer, a Hungarian royal gendarmerie officer, who has not absorbed Nazi ideology
- Imre Csuja as a corrupt SS officer
- Tamás Puskás as Adolf Eichmann
- András Stohl as Arrow Cross Lieutenant Nagy, who answers to Bleiber
- Giorgio Perlasca as himself (interview excerpt)
- László Szacsvay as László, a Hungarian violinist and friend of Perlasca

== Reception ==
In Italy the film was divided into two episodes for release as a two-part TV film. When the premiere of the second part was broadcast, it attracted 13 million viewers with a 43% share of TV coverage in Italy.

The New York Daily News said: "Zingaretti does a fine job shading a character that is written as an unalloyed saint. But the most touching moments come at the end, when we see documentary footage of his true-life inspiration."

The New York Times wrote that Perlasca deserved better than this film, criticizing some scenes as predictable, but its reviewer noted that "Mr. Zingaretti does carry off an exhilarating scene in which he bribes soldiers to take a Jewish woman and her daughter off the train headed for a death camp, then rescues many more."

== Awards ==
Perlasca won Best Actor and the Humanitarian Award at the Ft. Lauderdale International Film Festival and won best TV Movie Telegatto, in Italy.

== See also ==
Other Holocaust dramas based on true stories:

- Schindler's List
- Amen.
