= Loevy =

Loevy (Hebrew: לוי) is a surname. Notable people with the surname include:

- Edward Loevy (1857–1910), Polish-French painter and illustrator, husband of Marya
- Marya Chéliga-Loevy (1854–1927), Polish-French writer, playwright, feminist and pacifist
- Ram Loevy (1940–2025), Israeli television director and screenwriter
- Robert D. Loevy (born 1935), American political scientist

== See also ==
- Levi (surname) (another transliteration of the Hebrew word לוי)
