= Daniel Levi =

Daniel Levi may refer to:

- Daniel Lévi (1961–2022), French singer-songwriter, composer, and pianist
- Daniel Levi (police commissioner), Israeli law enforcement officer
- Danny Levi (born 1995), rugby league footballer

== See also ==
- Daniel Levy (disambiguation)
