= Leavy =

Leavy (Lee-Vee) is an Irish surname.

Notable people with the surname include:

- Bill Leavy, American football official
- Calvin Leavy (1940–2010), American blues musician
- Charles H. Leavy (1884–1952), American judge
- Edward Leavy (born 1929), American judge
- Jane Leavy, American sportswriter and feature writer
- Jim Leavy (1842–1882), Irish gunfighter in the Old West
- Joseph Britton Leavy (1872–1921), American philatelist at the Smithsonian Institution
- Stanley Leavy (1915–2016), American psychoanalyst

== See also ==
- McLeavy
