= Eva Lang (writer) =

Hungarian writer

- Born: 10 April 1925; Budapest
- Died: 2013?
- Occupations: Writer, poet, journalist
- Spouse: Pál Láng

Eva Lang, born Eva Königsberg (10 April 1925 in Budapest – 2013?) was a Hungarian writer, poet and journalist.

== Life ==
Daughter of Arnold Königsberg (1891–1956) and Ilona Vámos (1898–1961), Eva Lang began her studies at the Institute of the Scottish Reformed Mission in Budapest and then at the Álmos Jaschik Graphic Institute. She then graduated from the School of Journalism of the National Association of Hungarian Journalists (MÚOSZ). In 1944 she married Pál Láng in Terézváros. During the Second World War, Lang was persecuted but saved thanks to the protection work of Giorgio Perlasca in Budapest (forty years later - in 1989 - Lang was among the witnesses who contributed to the international recognition of Perlasca's actions, based on her testimony and family documents). After the war, Lang first moved to Canada and then to Israel.

From 1967 to 1985, she was an associate editor and designer at The Health Worker. Despite being a journalist and poet, similarly to many other Holocaust survivors she started publishing her works late in life, the first of which in 1985, entitled A nyomtalan nyomában. The following year, Lang published a new volume Ki fogja elbeszélni (Who will tell the story?). Between 1991 and 1992, she also graduated as an editor designer. In 1993 Lang was in the cast of the film Why wasn't there? by András Jeles, in which she played the role of the grandmother. In the same year Lang published Mókuskerék and in 1997 the book Köldökzsinóron.

Her daughter Zsuzsa died in 2002, just over fifty.

In 2003, Lang published Nincs kivétel with Tevan publisher, and a poem dedicated to the holocaust.

== Books ==
- Eva Lang, A nyomtalan nyomában, Szikra, 1985, ISBN 9631529770.
- Eva Lang, Ki fogja elbeszélni, Pallas Lap- és Könyvkiadó Vállalat, 1990, ISBN 9632722833.
- Eva Lang, Mókuskerék, Mediant, 1993, ISBN 9638263008.
- Eva Lang, Elkésett köszönet (költemény), in Tiszteletadás Angel Sanz-Briznek Spanyolország ügyvivőjének Magyarországon (1942-1944), Magánkiadás, 1994.
- Eva Lang, Köldökzsinóron, Mediant, 1997, ISBN 9638263067.
- Eva Lang, Nincs kivétel, Tevan, 2003, ISBN 9637278826.
- Eva Lang, A Holocaust Poem, Contemporary Review, 2003.
