= Yohanan Levi =

Hebrew linguist and historian

- יוחנן לוי
- Born: 1901; Berlin, German Empire
- Died: 20 July 1945 (aged 43–44); Jerusalem, Mandatory Palestine
- Occupations: Linguist, historian, professor
- Awards: Israel Prize (1957, posthumously)

Academic background
- Education: Ph.D., Berlin University (1926)

Academic work
- Discipline: Hebrew linguistics, history
- Sub-discipline: Second Temple period
- Institutions: Hebrew University of Jerusalem

Yohanan Levi (Hebrew: יוחנן לוי; 1901 – 20 July 1945) was a Hebrew linguist and historian, specialising in the Second Temple period.

== Biography ==
Levi was born in Berlin, Germany in 1901. He studied at Berlin University and received a doctorate in 1926. He emigrated to Mandate Palestine (now Israel) in 1934 and taught at the Hebrew University of Jerusalem, where he was professor of Roman language and literature. He died, age 44, in 1945. A number of his articles were collected by his students and published some fifteen years after his death.

== Awards ==
- In 1957, Levi was posthumously awarded the Israel Prize, for the humanities.

== See also ==
- List of Israel Prize recipients
- Levi
