= Legends Hospitality =

Hospitality company

Legends
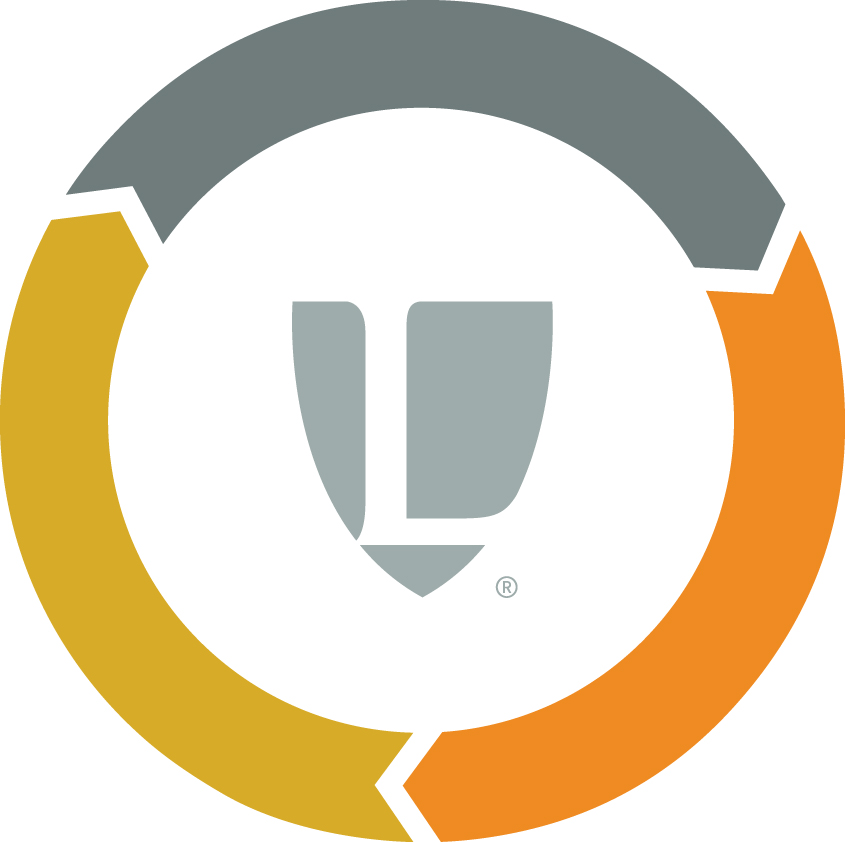
- Industry: Event hospitality services Ticket sales Merchandising
- Founded: October 2008; 17 years ago
- Headquarters: New York City, United States
- Area served: Worldwide
- Key people: Dan Levy (CEO)
- Owner: Sixth Street Partners; Jerry Jones; Yankee Global Enterprises
- Divisions: Hospitality; Global Sales; Global Planning; Global Merchandise; Global Partnerships; Global Technology Solutions; Global Attractions; Legends International
- Website: Official website

Legends is a food, beverage, merchandise, retail, and stadium operations corporation serving entertainment venues and companies. Formed in 2008, Legends is a joint venture of Yankee Global Enterprises and Jerry Jones of the Dallas Cowboys.

On October 20, 2008, Cowboys owner Jones and New York Yankees owner George Steinbrenner announced a joint business venture called Legends Hospitality Management LLC which would operate the concessions and merchandising sales at the AT&T Stadium in Arlington, Texas, and at the new Yankee Stadium in the Bronx, New York City, along with the stadiums of the Yankees' minor league affiliates. The company was also backed by Wall Street investment firm Goldman Sachs and Dallas private equity firm CIC Partners LP.

Legends has since branched out to multiple venues across the world such as the One World Observatory in a 15-year, $875 million contract, Levi's Stadium, Indianapolis Motor Speedway and IndyCar, Banc of California Stadium, Nissan Stadium, Angel Stadium, Golden 1 Center, SoFi Stadium, Allegiant Stadium, University of Southern California, Prudential Center, Notre Dame, the Rose Bowl, Oklahoma Sooners, Dallas Mavericks, Buffalo Bills, and numerous other professional and college venues and companies.

It has in addition branched out in what it offers. Although Legends began as a concessions company it has since expanded to help teams build and operate stadiums. It also sells naming rights, tickets, and Personal seat licenses on behalf of teams. In 2019, Legends negotiated the largest naming rights deal in the National Football League when SoFi agreed to a 20-year, $30 million per year deal with Kroenke Sports & Entertainment and the Los Angeles Chargers to sponsor SoFi Stadium in Inglewood, California.

In 2021, Legends was bought by Sixth Street Partners, who now lead the Legends partnership group with co-founders YGE Holdings, LLC, an affiliate of the New York Yankees, and Jones Concessions LP, an affiliate of the Dallas Cowboys.

On November 10, 2023, Legends announced it would be acquiring California-based ASM Global for an undisclosed amount.

On August 23, 2024, Legends announced the completion of its previously announced acquisition of ASM Global.
