= Edelweiss Emission =

- Founded: 1989
- Distributor: Edelweiss Emission
- Genre: classical and ancient music
- Country of origin: Switzerland
- Official website: http://www.edelweissemission.com

Edelweiss Emission is a Swiss independent record label that was founded in 1989. It is dedicated to classical and ancient music.

Artists who have recorded for the Edelweiss Emission label include the Argentine classical pianist Daniel Levy (classical pianist), the baritone and conductor Dietrich Fischer-Dieskau, the Philharmonia Orchestra, the baritone Wolfgang Holzmair, the Polish-Italian cellist Franco Maggio Ormezowski, the ensemble Ars Antiqua de Paris and the sitarist, Ravi Shankar.

Recording venues include Abbey Road Studios in London, The Barocksaal in Austria and the Scuola Grande di San Giovanni Evangelista in Venice, among others.

The label has a wide catalogue of recordings, with a repertoire that ranges from music of the Middle Ages and Renaissance – G. de Machaut – Venetian Music from the 16th century and Elizabethan Music, to the golden age of classical music, from Bach up to the romantic period. The catalogue also includes improvisations and contemporary classical music.

== See also ==
List of record labels
