= Richard Yuille =

American judge (1947–2026)

Richard Yuille (April 3, 1947 – July 28, 2026) was an American judge. In 2009 Yuille became the chief judge of the 7th Circuit Court of Genesee County in Michigan. He is known for acting as the judge for cases against the State of Michigan during the Flint Water Crisis. He was an editor of the Journal of Law Reform, and graduated with his JD from the University of Michigan Law School. Yuille died on July 28, 2026, at the age of 79.
