= Liza Levy =

- Born: Cape Town, South Africa
- Occupation: Jewish community activist
- Years active: Late 1980s – present
- Known for: Past president, Jewish Federation of Greater Washington; Co-founder, Jewish Coalition Against Domestic Abuse; Co-founder, Tikkun Olam Women's Foundation
- Spouse: Michael Levy

Liza Levy is an American community activist in Washington, D.C. She is a past president of the Jewish Federation of Greater Washington, co-founder of the Jewish Coalition Against Domestic Abuse, and co-founder of the Tikkun Olam Women's Foundation.

She has been honored with the Kipnis/Wilson Friedland Award from the Jewish Federations of North America as well as the Jerome J. Dick Young Leadership Award.

== Biography ==
She was born in Cape Town, South Africa, to a Jewish family. She graduated from the University of Cape Town Teachers College with a degree in childhood education. In 1984, she and her husband immigrated to the United States, settling in Washington, D.C.

She taught at the Jewish Community Center of Greater Washington's Early Childhood Department satellite center in Silver Spring, Maryland, later becoming director of the center. She joined the Jewish Federation of Greater Washington in the late 1980s, finding it a venue both to make friends and retain her Jewish identity. In 1998, she became a Federation board member, and served as president of women's philanthropy, chair of planning allocations, and chair of financial resource development. In 2013, she was elected to a two-year term as president.

In 2000, Levy co-founded the Jewish Coalition Against Domestic Abuse, for which she is an executive board member. In 2003, she co-founded the Tikkun Olam Women's Foundation, which invests in programs for women and girls.

She has been a member of the board of the Charles E. Smith Jewish Day School since 2001, and the board of the Adat Shalom Reconstructionist synagogue from 1999 to 2003.

== Honors and awards ==
In 2012, she was named one of the Women to Watch in the category of Community Leadership by Jewish Women International and received the Kipnis/Wilson Friedland award "for women demonstrating the highest ideals of leadership, philanthropy and volunteerism" from the Jewish Federations of North America. In 1999, she received the Jerome J. Dick Young Leadership Award.

== Personal ==
She and her husband, Michael Levy, have three children. They reside in Potomac, Maryland.
