= McLeavy =

McLeavy is a surname. Notable people with the surname include:

- Frank McLeavy, Baron McLeavy (1899–1976), British politician
- John McLeavy Brown (1835–1926), British diplomat
- Mike McLeavy (1898–?), Scottish footballer
- Robin McLeavy (born 1981), Australian actress

== See also ==
- McLeary
