= Sixth Street Partners =

American investment firm

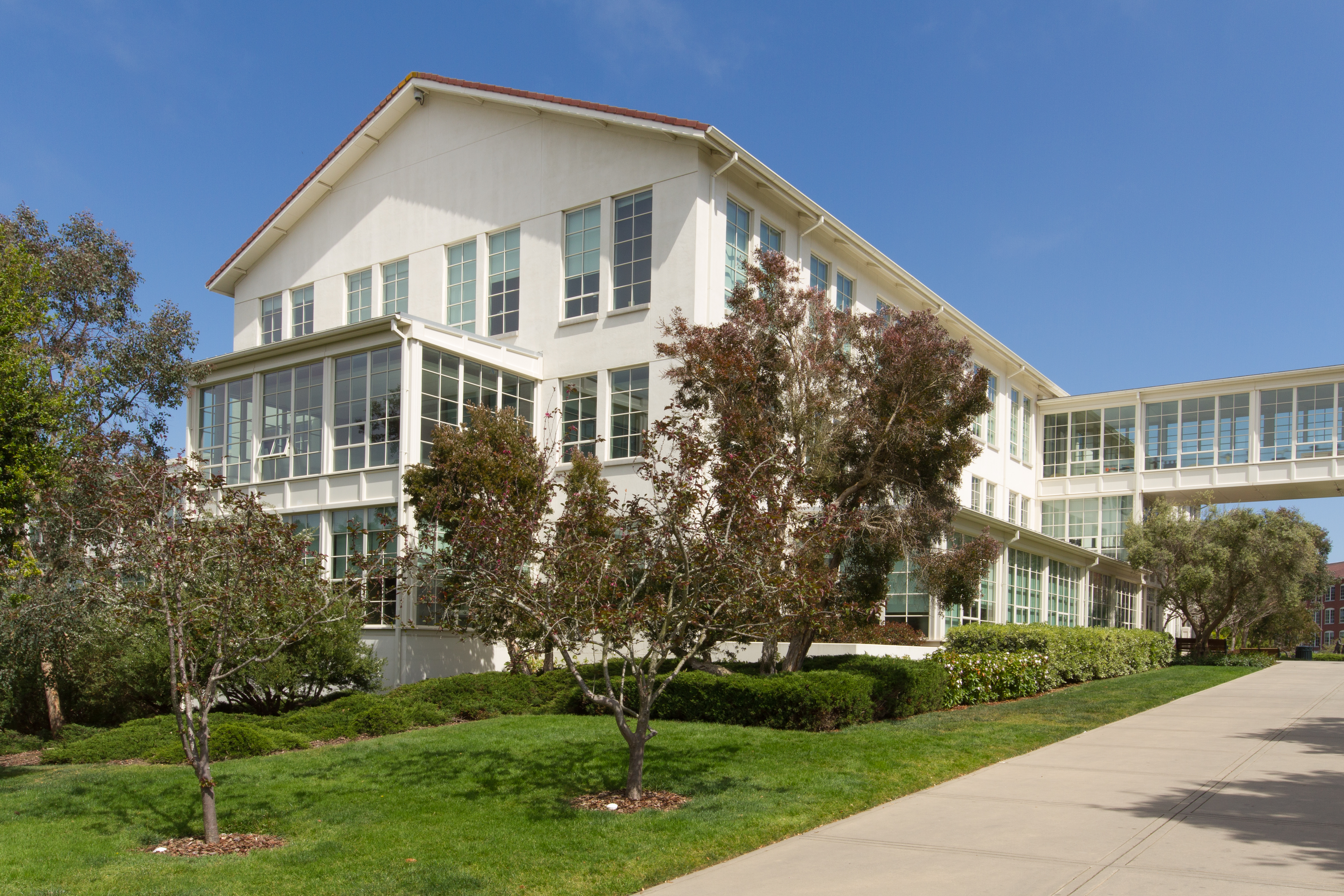
- Headquarters at the Letterman Digital Arts Center
- Type: Private
- Industry: Asset management
- Founded: 2009; 17 years ago
- Founders: Alan Waxman; Clint Kollar; David Stiepleman; Vijay Mohan; Joshua Easterly; Michael Muscolino; Matt Dillard; Bornah Moghbel; Steven Pluss
- Headquarters: Letterman Digital Arts Center; San Francisco, California, U.S.
- Number of locations: 11
- AUM: over $130 billion (2026)
- Number of employees: over 750 (2026)
- Website: sixthstreet.com

Sixth Street (formerly known as TSSP) is an American investment firm founded in 2009, based in San Francisco, California. The firm operates nine investment platforms across its growth investing, adjacencies, direct lending, fundamental public strategies, infrastructure, special situations, agriculture and par liquid credit businesses.

== History ==
Sixth Street was established in 2009, when CEO Alan Waxman recreated a type of investing platform that he had managed in his former role at Goldman Sachs. This included a strategic partnership with TPG, which made $2 billion in fund commitments to the Sixth Street team. The two firms operated autonomously while TPG maintained a minority stake in Sixth Street. They became formally independent in May 2020 when they had $34 billion in assets under management (AUM), and have grown to $75 billion AUM as of 2024. TPG Specialty Lending became Sixth Street Specialty Lending effective on June 15, 2020; Sixth Street Partners is the parent company of Specialty Lending's adviser, which also underwent a name change in 2020, from TSL Advisers, LLC to Sixth Street Specialty Lending Advisers, LLC. Sixth Street Specialty Lending is publicly traded on the New York Stock Exchange (NYSE) under the ticker symbol "TSLX".

== Notable investments ==
Sixth Street invests in the equity and debt of public and private companies, acquires real estate, finances infrastructure projects, and provides start-up capital to new businesses. Sixth Street has been noted in the financial media for the unusual structure of its largest fund, which is open-ended and able to hold longer-term investments.

=== Legends Hospitality ===
In January 2021, Sixth Street acquired a majority interest in Legends Hospitality, a sports and live entertainment services company co-founded by affiliates of the New York Yankees and Dallas Cowboys.

=== San Antonio Spurs ===
In June 2021, Sixth Street acquired a 20% stake in the San Antonio Spurs. They were joined by Michael Dell, who acquired a 10% stake.

=== Santiago Bernabéu Stadium (Real Madrid) ===
In May 2022, Real Madrid entered into a 20-year strategic partnership with Sixth Street and Legends concerning the exploitation of certain new businesses at the Santiago Bernabéu Stadium. Sixth Street acquired the right to participate in the operation of select new businesses at the stadium for a duration of 20 years, with Real Madrid receiving approximately €360 million.

=== FC Barcelona ===
In July 2022, Sixth Street acquired rights to 25% of FC Barcelona's income from LaLiga TV rights over the next 25 years. The deal was worth €207.5 million for the initial 10% stake and an additional €310 million for the other 15%. FC Barcelona did not transfer the relevant LaLiga TV rights directly to Sixth Street. Instead, the rights were transferred to a company known as Locksley, in which Sixth Street held a 51% stake and FC Barcelona retained the remaining 49%.

=== Bay FC ===
On April 4, 2023, the American National Women's Soccer League awarded one of its two planned 2024 expansion teams to a Bay Area group at a reported $53 million expansion fee. The expansion announcement confirmed the involvement of Sixth Street Partners as the Bay Area group's lead investor. Sixth Street CEO Alan Waxman and former United States women's national soccer team and professional club players Brandi Chastain, Leslie Osborne, Danielle Slaton, and Aly Wagner were announced as the club's founding board members. The club would be the first professional sports team in the United States to have an institutional investor as a majority owner, in contrast to rules established by other United States sports leagues that restricted or prohibited such ownership. NWSL commissioner Jessica Berman noted that the investment did not have a target hold period, and was funded from Sixth Street Tao Partners, a balance sheet fund with no requirement to be liquidated, which the league intended to treat like an individual owner with a large net worth. The team's name, Bay FC, and logo were announced on June 1, 2023.

=== Boston Celtics ===
In March 2025, it was announced that Sixth Street was reportedly part of William Chisholm’s $6.1bn takeover bid of NBA team Boston Celtics.

=== Sunderland Women ===
In April 2026, Bay Collective, Sixth Street's multi-club ownership vehicle purchased a majority stake in Sunderland A.F.C. Women. Sunderland currently compete in the English Women's Super League 2.

=== Spotify ===
In the spring of 2016, the firm co-led an investment consortium that invested $1 billion in music-streaming service Spotify Ltd. through debt convertible to equity.

=== Credit Suisse ===
In May 2016, Sixth Street purchased a $1.27 billion portfolio of debt and equity investments related to 170 different companies from Credit Suisse. The transaction's complexity and short turn-around time reportedly required a team of nearly 50 Sixth Street staff members to underwrite.

=== Airbnb ===
In Spring 2020, Sixth Street co-led a $1 billion equity and debt investment in online travel marketplace Airbnb.

=== Talcott Resolution ===
In January 2021, Sixth Street acquired Talcott Resolution, the former life insurance and annuity business of The Hartford, for more than $2 billion.

=== Caris Life Sciences ===
Sixth Street led an $830 million growth-equity round for precision oncology company Caris Life Sciences in May 2021. Sixth Street had previously invested in the company in 2018 and 2020.

=== Dyal Capital Partners ===
In April 2017, Dyal Capital Partners made a strategic minority investment valuing Sixth Street at $3.5 billion. All proceeds from the transaction were reinvested into Sixth Street's business. In February 2021, Sixth Street filed a lawsuit against Dyal, claiming that a competitor will own a stake of the firm after Dyal merges with Owl Rock and goes public.
