= David Levi =

David Levi may refer to:

- David Levi (Italy) (1816–1898), Italian-Jewish poet and politician
- David Levi (scholar) (1742–1801), Anglo-Jewish scholar
- David F. Levi (born 1951), Dean of Duke University Law School (United States) and former U.S. federal judge
- David Levi (musician) (born 1994), keyboardist of The Naked Brothers Band
- David Levi (poker player) (born 1962), professional poker player

== See also ==
- David Levy (disambiguation)
