= Clemente Pugliese Levi =

Italian painter (1855–1936)

Clemente Pugliese Levi (1855–1936) was an Italian painter, mainly of luminous alpine landscapes in his native Piedmont.

Born in Vercelli, he lived and worked in Turin. He was strongly influenced by Impressionism. He painted numerous vedute, including Il Mercato del Pesce. Among his works are Il Mattino nuvoloso; Fieno maturo; and a Chestnut forest. In the 1881 Exhibition at Turin, in 1881, he displayed Un'occhiata ai lavori; in 1884 again in Turin, he exhibited Sul mercato dei fiori a Porta Palazzo; La Dora and Uno studio dal vero. At the 1887 Mostra of Venice, he sent Color del sole; Paesaggio; Fieno maturo and Mattino nuvoloso. In 1888, he displayed Per la festa del Mercato; Un giorno triste; and Un bosco.
