= Levy Konigsberg =

American law firm

- Headquarters: 605 Third Avenue, 33rd Floor, New York City, NY 10158
- Major practice areas: Asbestos litigation
- Date founded: 1985
- Company type: LLP
- Website: www.levylaw.com

Levy Konigsberg is an American-based law firm that was established in 1985. The company is known for a number of high-profile cases in the United States. Its practice areas include asbestos litigation, qui tam, lead poisoning, sexual abuse, tobacco litigation, medical malpractice, and negligence. In 2015, Levy Konigsberg was recognized as one of the 50 Law Firms in the 2015 Elite Trial Lawyers list by The National Law Journal.

In March 2020, Levy Konigsberg announced plans to relocate its headquarters to 605 Third Avenue in Murray Hill.

== Recognition ==
The firm was recognized as one of the 50 Law Firms in the 2015 Elite Trial Lawyers list by The National Law Journal.

== Practice areas ==
=== Asbestos litigation ===
The firm's asbestos litigation involvement traces back to Levy's role in the litigation during the 1980s and early 1990s. Levy was one of the attorneys, cited by The New York Times, as representing workers at the Electric Boat shipyard in Groton, Connecticut in cases brought to trial beginning in 1982. In 1986, when Johns-Manville was completing its bankruptcy reorganization, Levy, who was head of the committee representing asbestos victims, was chosen to serve on the board of directors for the company while it emerged from bankruptcy.

In 1990, the firm and Levy participated in a large trial in federal court before Judge Jack Weinstein in Brooklyn involving more than 500 plaintiffs who claimed injury from asbestos exposure from working at the Brooklyn Navy Yard. According to a news article covering the Brooklyn Navy Yard trial, Levy Phillips & Konigsberg represented 132 of the plaintiffs and was then representing "more than 500 asbestos cases elsewhere".

The firm's involvement in asbestos litigation continued into the 2000s. In one series of cases, the firm represented clients against a miner of asbestos-contaminated talc located in St. Lawrence County, New York including a case in which a man developed mesothelioma from using the talc in creating pottery and another case in which a man developed the same asbestos-related cancer from using the talc in making ceramics. In a case against a different talc company, the firm was involved in another landmark talc case against a manufacturer for selling talc that was contaminated with asbestos. The firm secured a jury verdict for a man who developed mesothelioma from working in a factory that manufactured cosmetic talc products between 1967 and 1975.

The firm has also litigated asbestos cases against manufacturers and suppliers of asbestos-containing automotive products. In 2008, the firm obtained a $30.3 million jury verdict in Bergen County, New Jersey in a case in which a man died from mesothelioma at the age of 50. The man was exposed to asbestos from working a few summers at a General Motors auto parts warehouse. There was also $7.7 million for a family of a deceased school bus driver. The settlement was the largest of its kind to date in the Syracuse area of New York. The driver had been exposed to asbestos-laden brakes, gaskets, and clutches in the buses he had driven over a forty-year period. A similar case was brought against the Ford Motor Company by Levy Konigsberg when a man complained of asbestos related issues, after he worked on automotive parts between the 1960s to the 1980s bearing the Ford name.

In 2009, the burial of Harold St. John who developed mesothelioma was delayed after he died a couple of days before his trial was about to start. The St. John case picked up media coverage as the family was temporarily prevented by court order from performing the burial as the result of efforts by companies (including Chrysler) that contended that an autopsy would aid their defense. The family had refused the autopsy on religious and moral grounds. Levy Konigsberg was able to obtain a court order permitting the burial of Mr. St. John before the trial started without the need for an autopsy. After the ruling permitting St. John's burial, a spokesperson for Chrysler, stated: "At no time did Chrysler intend any disrespect to the late Mr. St. John or to his family at this difficult time." Moshe Maimon, partner with Levy Konigsberg, stated: "We are relieved that Harry St. John can finally rest in peace".

Levy Konigsberg handled a case of first impression in New Jersey involving a woman's exposure to asbestos from laundering her husband's contaminated work clothes worn home from an ExxonMobil plant. The case was concluded in 2011 when the New Jersey Supreme Court subsequently declined to hear the case thereby upholding the jury verdict in favor of the woman. The firm has also represented construction workers who helped construct some of the largest buildings and power plants in New York. This included a $7 million award in 2014 for a Long Island, New York man who participated in the construction of the Northport Power Station.

In an unusual case involving a truck driver who developed mesothelioma, Levy Konigsberg won a $7.3 million jury verdict in New York City in 2014 against Union Carbide. The man was exposed to asbestos from Union Carbide's asbestos-containing material that he picked up in bags from the company's plant in Bound Brook, New Jersey.

In a landmark case in 2014, Levy Konigsberg won a $90.5 million court judgment. Judge Ana Viscomi rendered the verdict after hearing evidence on the issue of damages arising from 11 people who died from mesothelioma in connection with the Johns-Manville plant located in Manville, New Jersey. The judgment was entered against two Swiss companies (Anova Holding AG and Becon AG) who supplied asbestos to the Manville plant but failed to participate in the legal proceeding brought against them in New Jersey.

In April 2015, Robert Komitor, a partner at Levy Konigsberg, spoke on behalf of a number of plaintiffs at a town hall meeting before Judge Peter Moulton, who presides over the New York City Asbestos Litigation. The New York Post reported on the meeting, which took place amid the public corruption case against Sheldon Silver, and quoted Komitor as stating "that he would oppose any reforms that could slow down the litigation process and put clients that are fatally ill at risk of dying before trial."

On April 11, 2018, Levy Konigsberg partner Moshe Maimon won a $117 million verdict against Johnson & Johnson Consumer, Inc. and Imerys Talc America for a client who developed mesothelioma from exposure to asbestos contained in Johnson's Baby Powder. The award consisted of $37 million in compensatory damages and $80 million in punitive damages. In an article about the verdict published by Reuters, Mr. Maimon stated: "We are gratified that justice was achieved and that our clients will be fairly compensated."

On May 31, 2019, Jerome Block, a Levy Konigsberg partner, won a verdict totaling $325 million against Johnson & Johnson, and its subsidiary company. The jury found in favor of Donna Olson who developed mesothelioma from asbestos contained in Johnson & Johnson's talcum powder products, including Johnson's Baby Powder. The jury awarded $25 million in compensatory damages to Mrs. Olson and her husband, and imposed $300 million in punitive damages against J&J and its subsidiary company Johnson & Johnson Consumer, Inc. According to Jerome Block, the lead trial counsel in the case: “The internal J&J documents that the jury saw, once more laid bare the shocking truth of decades of cover-up, deception and concealment by J&J of the asbestos found in talc baby powder.” Prompted by landmark verdicts like this, J&J announced in May 2020 that it was ending North American sales of its talc-based baby powder, which comprised half a percent of its consumer health business in the U.S.

In June 2020, Attorneys Amber Long and Moshe Maimon wrote an amicus curiae for the New Jersey Association of Justice, with Long arguing before the New Jersey Supreme Court, in the case of Whelan v. Armstrong International, Inc. The case resulted in a landmark ruling in which the Court held that manufacturers and distributors may be held liable for injuries caused by an asbestos-containing replacement part, even if they did not make or sell the part and that they have a duty to warn consumers about asbestos-containing parts.

In June 2022, the firm secured an appellate victory in the case of Fowler v. Union Carbide Corporation when the New Jersey Supreme Court ruled to reinstate a $2.38 million verdict against a Dow Chemical unit. In its ruling, the Court held that the company failed to sufficiently warn about its products’ risks when it informed employers and hoped the message would trickle down. The Fowler ruling significantly impacts asbestos litigation in New Jersey by reaffirming that asbestos manufacturers cannot evade liability when they fail to place adequate warnings on their products.

Since 2017, Partner Jerome Block and the firm have represented plaintiffs who claim that their use of Johnson & Johnson talc-based products caused their asbestos-related cancers. In May 2023, Block, was featured in a CNN investigation aired on The Whole Story with Anderson Cooper discussing litigation over J&J baby powder products and his representation of women diagnosed with cancer. In June 2023, the firm filed 116 mesothelioma cases against Kenvue, a J&J consumer health spinoff created by the company in response to its growing talc liabilities.

=== Qui Tam ===
Levy Konigsberg is active in Qui Tam cases also known as Whistleblower of False Claims Act cases. In one case filed in 2009, the firm represented a whistleblower, Dr. Gabriel Feldman, who uncovered a large-scale Medicaid fraud. Founding partner Alan J. Konigsberg represented Feldman in the case that resulted in a $70 million settlement paid to the U.S. Government by the New York City government. Feldman was awarded $14.7 million for his role in exposing the fraud. According to a New York Times article discussing the case, Dr. Feldman contended in the lawsuit that "the city was giving people services that squandered taxpayer money". The case concluded years of work by Dr. Feldman when he "began reviewing Medicaid cases in New York in 1990, and first tried to blow the whistle on the city's program in 1993 when he testified before the City Council." The $70 million settlement is one of the largest awards in whistleblower cases that New York City has ever paid.

=== Lead poisoning ===
Another practice area for Levy Konigsberg is representing children that have suffered lead poisoning, often from lead paint used in residences and lead contaminated drinking water. In one case, a young boy suffered from lead poisoning in a rented, city-owned apartment in the Bedford-Stuyvesant section of Brooklyn, New York. Levy Konigsberg won the case, receiving a $3.85 million jury verdict. The New York Post reported that the damages for the lead-poisoned child were $850,000 for pain and suffering and $3 million for loss of earning potential.

Levy Konigsberg is representing a large number of children who suffered lead poisoning as the result of exposure to contaminated water in Flint, Michigan. The Detroit News reported that the firm had filed individual personal injury cases on behalf of 949 children as of October 2016. Levy Konigsberg also represents children suffering from lead poisoning in a federal class action against the New York City Housing Authority. Stern has publicly called out the political response to the NYCHA scandal as far more forgiving of New York City Mayor Bill de Blasio than of Michigan Governor Rick Snyder.

In August 2020, Levy Konigsberg Attorney Corey Stern, who served as "lead counsel" in the Flint Water Crisis litigation, signed a $600 million settlement agreement with the State of Michigan, the largest settlement in state history, to resolve years-long litigation over the Flint Water Crisis. As an architect of the settlement, Stern advocated for terms that ensured most of the settlement funds would be paid to children ages six and younger. In November 2021, the Court issued final approval of the $626 million settlement.

Stern and Levy Konigsberg continue to represent plaintiffs in litigation against private companies involved in switching the source of Flint's drinking water from Lake Huron to the Flint River. In 2022, the firm began a civil bellwether trial against two engineering firms hired as consultants for the city's water supply on behalf of four children who suffered brain damage and other injuries after being exposed to contaminated water.

In October 2021, Stern and Levy Konigsberg filed a lawsuit against the city of Jackson, Mississippi over claims that city officials disregarded warnings about water safety, corrosion, and unsafe levels of lead in its water supply for more than six years. The firm represents over 600 children in ongoing litigation.

On May 27, 2022, Levy Konigsberg Attorneys Corey Stern, Amber Long, and Kimberly Russell filed a federal civil lawsuit in Michigan on behalf of approximately 400 children exposed to lead contaminated water in Benton Harbor. The 111-page complaint claims the city of Benton Harbor and other defendants “severely downplayed the urgency of the water crisis” and “exacerbated the crisis by concealing and misrepresenting its scope, failing to take effective remedial action to eliminate it, and then lying about it to cover up their misconduct.”

=== Sexual abuse ===
Levy Konigsberg maintains an active sexual abuse litigation practice representing child and adult abuse survivors nationwide.

In 2019, the firm filed a class action lawsuit in U.S. District Court for the Southern District of New York against the estate of Dr. Reginald Archibald, Rockefeller University Hospital, and the Madison Square Boys and Girls Club over alleged sexual abuse committed by the pediatric endocrinologist and re-traumatization of victims from unsolicited mass mailings sent to over 1,000 former patients.

Thanks in part to the passing of the New York Adult Survivor's Act and the California Sexual Abuse and Cover Up Accountability Act, which create temporary lookback windows for abuse victims to revive claims barred by the statute of limitations, the firm represents a growing number of former female inmates who were sexually abused by guards and staff at correctional facilities across New York, California, and the country.

In September 2022, the New York Daily News published a cover story about the firm's representation of women who were sexually abused at NY prisons and jails and its pending litigation under the Adult Survivor's Act. The article featured stories from several of the firm's clients and an interview with Partner Anna Kull, who heads the firm's sexual abuse practice.

In November 2022, the firm filed lawsuits on behalf of numerous former female inmates who were sexually abused by correctional officers and staff at the Bayview Correctional Facility in Manhattan. The filings were the first of hundreds Levy Konigsberg expects to file against the NY State prison system under the Adult Survivor's Act.

In 2023, during the months leading up to the November 24th deadline of the Adult Survivors Act’s temporary filing window, Kull and the firm’s sexual abuse litigation team received significant coverage for their work filing civil lawsuits on behalf of hundreds of survivors, including numerous former female inmates who were sexually abused at women’s jails and prisons across New York. This coverage included Kull’s appearance in an episode of the Brutally Informed podcast, a Buffalo News cover story, a Prism reposts article, and the short documentary film, “A Chance for Justice: Life After Abuse in Prison.”

=== Tobacco litigation ===
Levy Konigsberg is one of the few firms to have obtained multiple jury verdicts against makers of cigarettes in tobacco litigation.

In a case filed in 2005, the firm represented Eileen Clinton in a lawsuit over the lung cancer death of her husband Bill Champagne, who began smoking cigarettes when he was 12 years old. Following a three-week trial in 2012 in White Plains, New York, the jury awarded $1.34 million in damages after finding that R.J. Reynolds Tobacco Company, through a predecessor company which manufactured the Lucky Strikes cigarettes Mr. Champagne smoked as a young man, negligently failed to warn of the health hazards and addictiveness of its cigarettes. On a separate claim, the jury found that co-defendant Philip Morris USA fraudulently marketed “Marlboro Lights,” a brand of cigarettes Mr. Champagne later smoked as an adult, in a manner that could lull consumers into a false belief that “light” cigarettes were safer.

In a separate tobacco case tried by Levy Konigsberg in 2013, the firm represented Florence Mulholland whose husband David Mulholland died from lung cancer at the age of 57. Mulholland started smoking at the age of 13, was a pack a day smoker by the age of 15 and died from lung cancer in 2005. The jury rendered a verdict in favor of the Mulhollands against Philip Morris USA. The award of $4.93 million was entered by the New York federal judge who denied Philip Morris' motions to set aside the verdict. Philip Morris then appealed the verdict to the United States District Court for the Second Circuit who upheld the verdict in 2015. In the same ruling, the Court denied Levy Konigsberg's cross-appeal to send the case back to the trial court for consideration of punitive damages. The Court determined that the Master Settlement Agreement reached between the Tobacco Industry and the Attorney General for the State of New York barred claims in New York courts for punitive damages relating to tobacco industry misconduct.

In October 2018, Partner Jerry Block secured a $43.1 million verdict against R.J. Reynolds on behalf of his client Louis Summerlin, who developed lung cancer from smoking menthol cigarettes and from asbestos exposure during his work as a brake mechanic. The case was the first lung cancer case in the U.S. to be litigated through trial against both big tobacco and asbestos product companies. The Summerlin trial was featured in an episode of The Great Trials Podcast

== Other cases ==
=== Childcare abuse ===
Since 2015, Levy Konigsberg has been involved in a civil lawsuit against a pre-school after evidence showed that some of the children had been abused. Videos of the abuse went viral, showing rough and aggressive handling of children. Following the viral leak, a lawyer from Levy Konigsberg appeared on NBC News. The teacher involved was indicted following the incident.

=== Repetitive stress injury ===
In the 1990s, the firm represented a large number of plaintiffs who suffered repetitive strain injury (RSI) allegedly caused, in part, by poorly designed data processing equipment. In one of the earliest RSI case, Apple settled the lawsuit of Nancy Ubanski, a 30-year-old former high school secretary, who suffered disabling injuries to her hands and wrists. The New York Times reported that Apple settled the case after it discovered that its outside litigation firm had failed to disclose relevant documents.

The firm won a verdict of $5.3 million in an RSI case tried in 1996 against Digital Equipment Corporation. However, that verdict was overturned in 1997 by Judge Jack Weinstein. As of 1997, a lawyer representing I.B.M. stated that 13 out of 14 RSI cases that had been decided by juries had been decided in favor of the defendants. This trend of defense verdicts in the RSI cases continued in June 1998 when a federal jury in Brooklyn rejected the claims of nine people who suffered injuries from using computer keyboards.
