= Josef Levi =

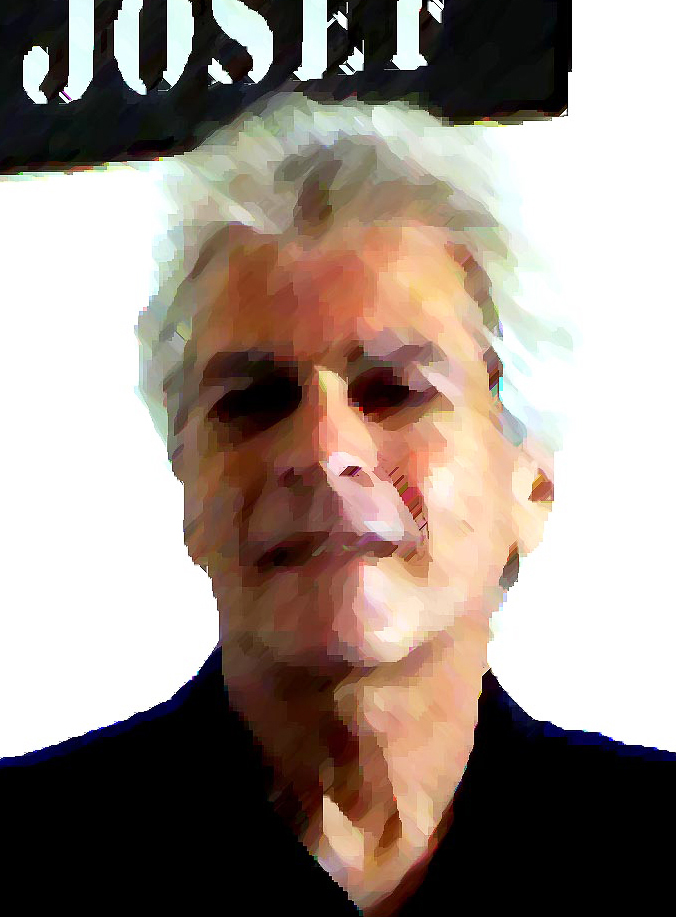
Self portrait (2011); 17 in. x 23 in.

Josef Alan Levi (born February 17, 1938) is an American artist whose works range over a number of different styles, but which are unified by certain themes consistently present among them. Levi began his artistic career in the 1960s and early '70s, producing highly abstract and very modernist pieces: these employing exotic materials such as light fixtures and metallic parts. By 1975, Levi had transitioned to painting and drawing still lifes. At first these were, traditionally, of mundane subjects. Later, he would depict images from art history, including figures originally created by the Old Masters. Around 1980, he made another important shift, this time toward creating highly precise, though subtly altered reproductions of pairs of female faces which were originally produced by other artists. It is perhaps this work for which he is most well known. Since around 2000, Josef Levi has changed the style of his work yet again: now he works entirely with computers, using digital techniques to abstract greatly from art history, and also from other sources.

Two of the most important themes of Josef Levi's artwork are recognized to be: the female form, especially the face; and the similarities in visual aesthetics which transcend cultures. Indeed, since the date his first creations, the vast majority of Levi's material has been taken from female characters in the art of others; and often multiple works are combined in his pieces in order to highlight the relations between the original works. Furthermore, he has been inspired by a great variety of other artists. Levi's works of art in the collections of the Museum of Modern Art, the National Gallery of Art, and the Albright-Knox Museum, among many others. Levi's art has been featured on the cover of Harper's Magazine twice, once in June 1987, and once in May 1997.

== Biography ==
Josef Levi was born to Jacob Levi and Evelyn D. Levi (maiden name Speizer) on February 17, 1938, in New York City. Josef Levi received a Bachelor of Arts degree in 1959 from the University of Connecticut, where he majored in fine arts and minored in literature. From 1959 to 1960, he served to a first lieutenant in the U.S. Army, and from 1960 through 1967 he was in the U.S. Army Reserves.

In 1966, he received the Purchase Award from the University of Illinois in 1966, and he was featured in New Talent U.S.A. by Art in America. He was an artist in residence at Appalachian State University in 1969, taught at Farleigh Dickenson University in 1971 and was a visiting professor of art at Pennsylvania State University in 1977. From 1975 to 2007, Levi resided in New York City. He now lives in an apartment in Rome, where he is able to paint with natural light as he was unable in New York.

== Early work ==
Impermanence of visual experience is the only constant reality. I wish to emphasize this mutability under varying conditions of light and color.

—Art in America, Summer, 1966

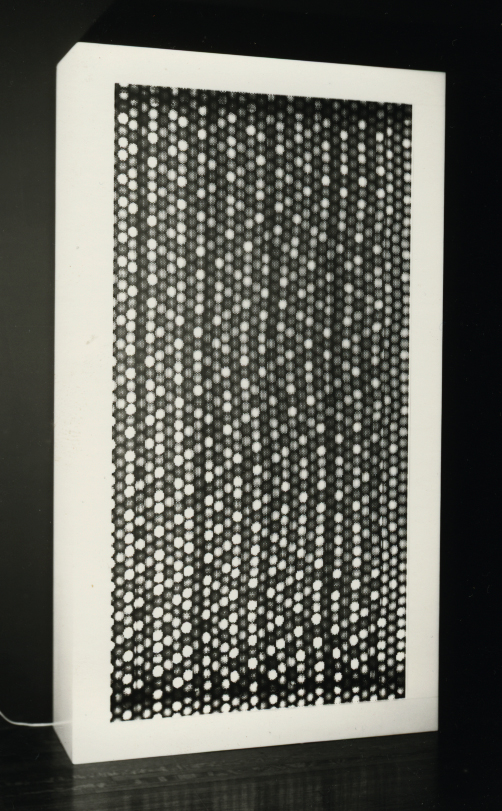
Sarigan (1968); construction with perforated metal and fluorescent light; 103 in. x 58 in. x 18 in.

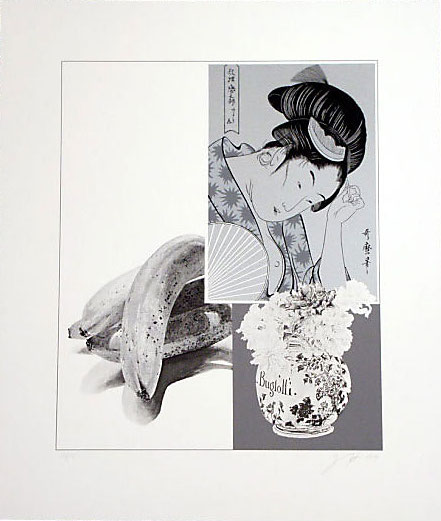
Still life with Utamaro (1979); from a set of three serigraphs; 21.75 x 25.5 inches

From 1959 to 1960, Josef took some courses of Howard McParlin Davis and Meyer Schapiro at Columbia University which initiated him into the techniques of reproducing the works of the Old Masters. His first works, created in the 1960s, were wood and stone sculptures of women. His first mature works were abstract pieces, constructed of electric lights and steel.

In 1970, Levi's materials included fluorescent light bulbs, Rust-Oleum and perforated metal in addition to paint and canvas. His works of this period are characterized by seeming more than the sum of their mundane materials, and each forced the viewer to reflect on his own perceptual relationship with the art. At this time, Levi was being influenced by artistic works with magical and religious purposes, and he was able to transcend time in true modernist fashion.

Before about 1975, Levi's focus was primarily creating still lifes, and the subject of his paintings and drawings were everyday objects. Later, the majority of his work was based around reproducing and referencing subjects of art history, but even then, when his material pictured people instead of things, each work was described as a "still life". Indeed, to Levi, the reproductions of art from which he works are the objects of a still life in the same sense as a flower or a bowl of fruit.

== Faces of two women ==
By 1980, Josef Levi's art had transformed into a very specific form: a combination of reproductions of female faces which were originally depicted by other artists. The faces which he reproduces may be derived from either portraits or from small portions of much larger works; they are taken from paintings of the Old Masters, Japanese ukiyo-e, and 20th-century art. Artists from whom he has borrowed include: Vermeer, Rembrandt, Piero della Francesca, Botero, Matisse, Utamaro, Correggio, Da Vinci, Picasso, Chuck Close, Max Beckmann, Pisanello, Lichtenstein. The creation of these works is informed by Levi's knowledge and study of art history.

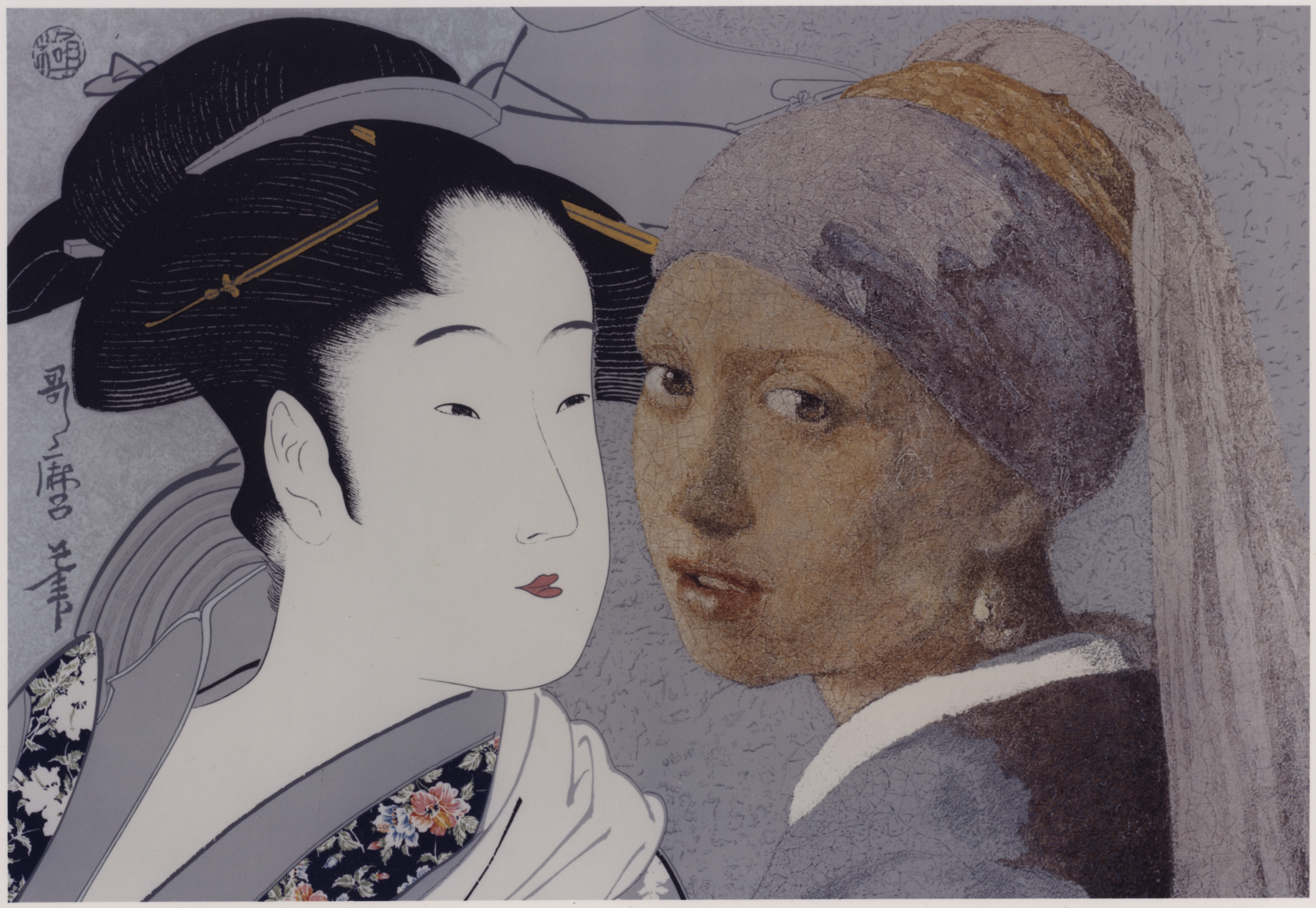
"Still life with Utamaro and Vermeer"

Levi pays great attention to the quality of his reproductions, and he must often employ magnifying glasses for the highly precise work. Levi, in general, carefully preserves the facial expressions of his subjects, and major facets of their appearance, e.g. what sort of clothing the women are wearing. In the generation of these pieces, however, fidelity is not absolute: colors are neutralized; scales are altered; angles are shifted. The two works are made to fit together comfortably in a larger composition, eschewing the landscapes and interiors which were their backgrounds before.

Often the works combined are of very different sorts, and they create a strong contrast in the final piece. Still, the works may have much in common; perhaps both works are three-quarter poses, or the women share an expression. Through trompe-l'œil, Levi "unifies" the works and enhances the contrast, comparing the periods by, for example, the deterioration of the sources which marks their temporal origins. Indeed, Levi has stated that, for him, the similarities between the faces are more important than the differences, and particularly important is the constancy of formal aesthetics throughout the history of art. This is a major concept which he tries to communicate through his art.

Josef Levi's paintings from this period are drawn, then painted on fine linen canvas on wooden stretchers. The canvas is coated with twenty-five layers of gesso in order to produce a smooth surface on which to work. The drawing phase takes at least one month. Levi seals the drawing with acrylic varnish, and then he may apply layers of transparent acrylic in order to approximate the look of old paintings. After the last paint is applied, another layer of acrylic varnish is sprayed on to protect the work.

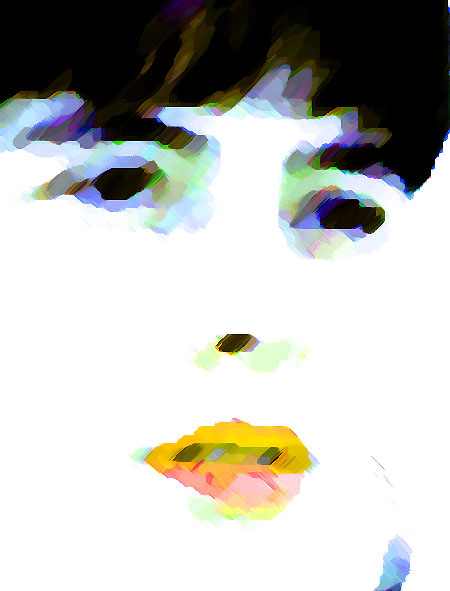
Still life with Jane (2007); 50 x 37 in.

== Digital work ==
Around 2000, Josef Levi began supplementing his manual work with digital techniques, abstracting his form, but maintaining the same subjects. Since then, Levi has developed his art much further, now using computers exclusively, printing his results on both canvases and paper. His work is increasingly abstract, as he flattens space and avoids lines, while highlighting the eyes and mouth. His work still centers on female faces and heads, but Levi also depicts acquaintances and engages in more traditional portraiture work, albeit in his new style. Most of the figures in his contemporary pieces are not paired with any others. His current work can be seen on youtube.com, https://www.youtube.com/watch?v=f7MTrphCmvM and https://www.youtube.com/watch?v=AR_wJP_L8OU&feature=relmfu,
