= Solomon Levy (cricketer) =

English cricketer

Solomon Levy (born 18 May 1886, death date unknown) was an English cricketer. A right-handed batsman and right-arm off break spin bowler born in Stroud, Levy played four County Championship matches for Gloucestershire between July 1910 and July 1911. Primarily a bowler, he took four wickets at a bowling average of 36.75, and scored 43 runs at a batting average of 7.16.
