= Hirtzel Levy =

Alsatian Jew wrongfully executed in 1754

Abraham Hirtzel Levy (died 31 December 1754) was an Alsatian Jew from Wettolsheim, who was falsely accused of theft, tortured, and executed in Colmar.

Alongside three other Jews, Levy faced accusations of having stolen property valued at 3,000 livres from the house of a widow named Madeline Koppinn. Despite all having alibis, Levy and his co-accused were subjected to the judicial practice known as the "ordinary and extraordinary question" (a French euphemism for water cure) Levy maintained his innocence, and was consequently subjected to execution by the breaking wheel the following day.

Prominent Jewish figures of Alsace, convinced of his innocence, pursued an appeal to the Privy Council of Paris. The Privy Council, on 16 June 1755, rendered a verdict that overturned the prior decision, declaring Levy innocent. His remains were removed from the gallows, enshrouded in a tallit, and buried in the Jewish cemetery of Jungholtz.

== See also ==
- Antisemitism in France
- History of the Jews in Alsace
