= Alexander Levi =

First immigrant to be naturalized in Iowa

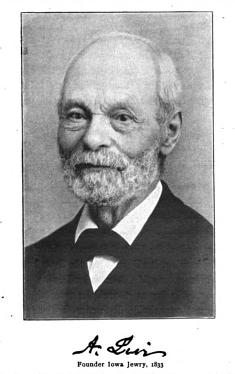
- Alexander Levi, founder of the Iowa Jewish Community
- Born: March 13, 1809; Hellimer, France
- Died: March 31, 1893 (aged 84); Dubuque, Iowa

Alexander Levi, a French Jew of Sephardic origin, was the first immigrant to be naturalized in Iowa, when it was still part of Wisconsin Territory. He was born on March 13, 1809, in Hellimere, France near Strasbourg and arrived in the town of Dubuque on August 1,1833 where he became a civic, business and religious leader. A grocer, miner, mine provisioner and successful department store owner, he founded the first two Jewish congregations in the city, was a loyal Whig, served a term as Justice of the Peace and was the first Mason to be sworn in after the Dubuque lodge received its charter. He was naturalized in 1837 and died in 1893.
