= Gerson Levi-Lazzaris =

Brazilian archaeologist

Gerson Levi-Lazzaris (born November 25, 1979, in Curitiba) is a Brazilian archaeologist. He is a descendant of Ladin immigrants. Most Lazzaris are from Forno di Zoldo, Veneto. Most of them emigrated around the end of the 19th century, with more moving after the Second World War to Argentina, Australia, Brazil and the United States.

== Early life ==
In 1983, his family moved from Curitiba to São Paulo. At age 15 he moved to Lisbon, Portugal, following a short time in Finland. He enrolled in the University of São Paulo, initially studying Archaeology and History, focusing on antisemitism in the Austro-Hungarian Empire. He graduated in 2003. In 2007 he obtained a master's degree in archaeology. His dissertation examined Middle Holocene hunter-gatherer societies in Southeast Brazil. He introduced the ecosystem approach in Brazilian archaeology. In March 2007 he enrolled at Vanderbilt University.

== Career ==
Levi-Lazzaris has published articles ranging from political reviews in Trotskyist periodicals to scientific reviews and governmental reports. He has translated books. Levi-Lazzaris developed his doctoral research in Roraima among the Ninam Indians, a Yanomamo subgroup, publishing ethnoarchaeological studies from the Uraricoera valley. He was the second coordinator of the Frente de Proteção Etnoambiental Yanomami e Ye´kuana through FUNAI during 2010–2011.
