= David Levy (historian) =

David W. Levy
- Born: David William Levy; May 6, 1937; Chicago, Illinois
- Died: August 8, 2025 (aged 88); Norman, Oklahoma
- Occupations: Professor, historian, author
- Years active: 1967 - 2025

David W. Levy is Professor Emeritus of the Department of History of Oklahoma University at Norman Oklahoma. Not only has he written and lectured extensively, many of his former students have gone on to achieve their own notability have stated that he was one of their favorite teachers and mentors.

According to Encyclopedia.com, David W. Levy was born May 6, 1937, to newspaperman Roy A. Levy and his wife Helen Loeffler Levy in Chicago, Illinois. David married Lynne Hunt on September 7, 1969. They have two children, a son, and a daughter.

== Academic background ==
David Levy earned a Bachelor of Arts (B.A.) degree from the University of Illinois in 1959, a Master of Arts (M. A.) degree from University of Chicago in 1961 and a Doctor of Philosophy (Ph. D.) from University of Wisconsin in 1967. He taught at Ohio State University in Columbus, Ohio for three years (1964-1967) as an instructor in history, then moved to the University of Oklahoma (OU) in 1967, where he spent much of his career. He was named David Ross Boyd Professor of History in 1985, and has also been designated as a Sam K. Viersen Presidential Professor, and the Irene and Julian Rothbaum Professor of History. His chief scholarly interests are in American intellectual and constitutional history. He has held the title of Professor Emeritus since 2006. Levy was inducted to the Oklahoma Higher Education Hall of Fame in 2006.

Missouri University of Science and Technology appointed Levy as the 2010 Maxwell C. Weiner Distinguished Professor of Humanities.

== Honors ==
- Levy was given both the Regents’ Award for Superior Teaching and the Student Association’s Award for the Outstanding Teacher at the University of Oklahoma.
- The Oklahoma Higher Education Heritage Society called Professor Levy, "...one of the finest classroom teachers ever to serve on their (University of Oklahoma) faculty.
- After completing three volumes of an Oklahoma history series, some sources have called him, "the official historian of Oklahoma."
- David and his wife, Lynne, were charter members of the OU Academy of the Lynx, an organization founded by President David Boren in 2002 to support the school's History of Science Program.

== Professional memberships ==
- American Studies Association
- Organization of American Historians
- Phi Alpha Theta
- Phi Beta Kappa
