= A. F. J. Levi =

British physicist

Anthony Levi
- Born: February 3, 1959 (age 67); London, United Kingdom
- Education: University of Sussex; University of Cambridge
- Known for: Microdisk nanolaser Hot electron transport Optimal semiconductor device design
- Scientific career
- Fields: Physics; Electrical Engineering
- Workplaces: Bell Laboratories; University of Southern California

Anthony F. J. Levi (born 1959) is a British-born engineer and academic. He is professor of electrical and computer engineering at the Department of Electrical and Computer Engineering of the University of Southern California (USC).

He is known for inventing hot electron spectroscopy, discovering ballistic electron transport in heterostructure bipolar transistors, and demonstrating room-temperature unipolar ballistic transistors.

His research focuses on semiconductor device physics, optoelectronics, and hardware security.

== Education and career ==
He received his Ph.D. in Physics from the University of Cambridge in 1983. Following his doctoral studies, he joined AT&T Bell Laboratories.

At Bell Labs, he conducted research in semiconductor device technology, including the discovery of ballistic electron transport in heterostructure bipolar transistors and the demonstration of room-temperature unipolar transistors with ballistic electron transport.

In 1993, Levi joined the faculty at the University of Southern California, where he holds appointments in the Ming Hsieh Department of Electrical and Computer Engineering and the Department of Physics and Astronomy. From 2018 to 2024, he served as Chair of the Department of Electrical and Computer Engineering – Electrophysics.

== Research ==
His early research contributed to the development of parallel fiber-optic interconnects, which are essential for enabling high-speed communication in computer and switching systems.

He invented hot electron spectroscopy, a method used to probe non-equilibrium electron transport in semiconductor devices.

He is also credited with the creation of the microdisk laser, a compact and efficient semiconductor laser widely used in photonic research.

Working with Agilent Technologies, Levi co-developed an optical connector plug-in package capable of transmitting data at an aggregate rate of 10 Gb/s in late 2000.

Working with the Paul Scherrer Institute and researchers at the USC Viterbi School of Engineering, Levi helped advance a technique for defect detection in manufactured semiconductor chips as well as for reverse engineering of circuits.

In an interview with Reuters, Levi commented on supply chain concerns facing the chip industry in the U.S. during the COVID-19 pandemic, suggesting that such issues could be mitigated by focusing on rebuilding the U.S. chip manufacturing and packaging industry.

Levi’s research combines experimental and theoretical approaches across multiple domains, reflecting a broad and integrative vision that bridges solid-state physics, quantum electronics, and applied engineering.

His pioneering work in semiconductor device physics and optoelectronics includes studies on nonequilibrium electron transport, ballistic electron transport in transistors, and microdisk lasers, which have advanced the understanding of high-speed electronic and photonic systems.

In the field of photonics and quantum engineering, Levi has developed integrated photonic systems and explored the quantum-classical boundaries in device design, contributing to innovations in both optical communication and quantum information processing.

He has also demonstrated leadership in hardware security and chip imaging, particularly through the development of 3D X-ray imaging technologies used for microchip inspection and tamper detection, a research area that has received significant attention in the scientific and technical press since 2019.

Levi has led several notable projects at USC in collaboration with industry and government partners. Among these, the 3D X-ray microchip imaging focuses on developing high-resolution 3D X-ray techniques for integrated circuit inspection, enabling the detection of structural defects and unauthorized modifications in semiconductor devices. Another key initiative, quantum and hybrid device optimization, involves ongoing studies on the design, performance limits, and control of hybrid classical–quantum devices, integrating concepts from applied quantum mechanics and nanofabrication.

Levi is the author of several widely used textbooks that connect fundamental physics with practical device design. His book Applied Quantum Mechanics is a comprehensive, application-focused text written for engineers, materials scientists, and applied physicists. Now in its third edition, this book emphasizes real-world examples and includes worked problems, as well as coverage of quantum engineering, quantum information processing, and device optimization. Essential Semiconductor Laser Device Physics, now in its second edition, offers a concise overview of semiconductor laser principles, threshold behavior, and design strategies, serving as a key reference for engineers and researchers working on semiconductor lasers. Essential Classical Mechanics for Device Physics is a concise introduction to classical mechanics concepts, providing readers with the theoretical and mathematical foundation for modern device design.

== Selected publications ==
- McCall, S. L.; Levi, A. F. J.; Slusher, R. E.; Pearton, S. J.; Logan, R. A. (1992-01-20). "Whispering-gallery mode microdisk lasers". Applied Physics Letters. 60 (3): 289–291. doi:10.1063/1.106688. ISSN 0003-6951.
- Chen, Chun-Chung; Aykol, Mehmet; Chang, Chia-Chi; Levi, A. F. J.; Cronin, Stephen B. (2011-05-11). "Graphene-Silicon Schottky Diodes". Nano Letters. 11 (5): 1863–1867. doi:10.1021/nl104364c. ISSN 1530-6984.
- Chuang, Shun Lien; Schmitt-Rink, Stefan; Greene, Benjamin I.; Saeta, Peter N.; Levi, Anthony F. J. (1992-01-06). "Optical rectification at semiconductor surfaces". Physical Review Letters. 68 (1): 102–105. doi:10.1103/physrevlett.68.102. ISSN 0031-9007.
- Levi, A. F. J.; Slusher, R. E.; McCall, S. L.; Glass, J. L.; Pearton, S. J.; Logan, R. A. (1993-02-08). "Directional light coupling from microdisk lasers". Applied Physics Letters. 62 (6): 561–563. doi:10.1063/1.108911. ISSN 0003-6951.
- Tung, R. T.; Levi, A. F. J.; Sullivan, J. P.; Schrey, F. (1991-01-07). "Schottky-barrier inhomogeneity at epitaxial NiSi₂ interfaces on Si (100)". Physical Review Letters. 66 (1): 72–75. doi:10.1103/physrevlett.66.72. ISSN 0031-9007.</ref>
- Levi, A. F. J.; Hayes, J. R.; Platzman, P. M.; Wiegmann, W. (1985-11-04). "Injected-Hot-Electron Transport in GaAs". Physical Review Letters. 55 (19): 2071–2073. doi:10.1103/physrevlett.55.2071. ISSN 0031-9007.
- Levi, A.F.J.; Slusher, R.E.; Mccall, S.L.; Tanbun-Ek, T.; Coblentz, D.L.; Pearton, S.J. (1992-05-21). "Room temperature operation of microdisc lasers with submilliamp threshold current". Electronics Letters. 28 (11): 1010–1012. doi:10.1049/el:19920642. ISSN 0013-5194.
- Levi, A. F. J. (2023-08-31). Applied Quantum Mechanics. Cambridge University Press. ISBN 978-1-009-30808-3.
- Nordin, R.A.; Levi, A.F.J.; Nottenburg, R.N.; O'Gorman, J.; Tanbun-Ek, T.; Logan, R.A. (1992). "A systems perspective on digital interconnection technology". Journal of Lightwave Technology. 10 (6): 811–827. doi:10.1109/50.143082. ISSN 0733-8724.
- Valles, J. M.; White, A. E.; Short, K. T.; Dynes, R. C.; Garno, J. P.; Levi, A. F. J.; Anzlowar, M.; Baldwin, K. (1989-06-01). "Ion-beam-induced metal–insulator transition in YBa₂Cu₃O₇−δ: A mobility edge". Physical Review B. 39 (16): 11599–11602. doi:10.1103/physrevb.39.11599. ISSN 0163-1829.
- Tung, R. T.; Levi, A. F. J.; Gibson, J. M. (1986-03-10). "Control of a natural permeable CoSi2 base transistor". Applied Physics Letters. 48 (10): 635–637. doi:10.1063/1.96728. ISSN 0003-6951.
- Holler, Mirko; Odstrcil, Michal; Guizar-Sicairos, Manuel; Lebugle, Maxime; Müller, Elisabeth; Finizio, Simone; Tinti, Gemma; David, Christian; Zusman, Joshua; Unglaub, Walter; Bunk, Oliver; Raabe, Jörg; Levi, A. F. J.; Aeppli, Gabriel (2019-10-07). "Three-dimensional imaging of integrated circuits with macro- to nanoscale zoom". Nature Electronics. 2 (10): 464–470. doi:10.1038/s41928-019-0309-z. ISSN 2520-1131.
- Levi, A.F.J. (2000). "Optical interconnects in systems". Proceedings of the IEEE. 88 (6): 750–757. doi:10.1109/5.867688. ISSN 0018-9219.
- Levi, A. F. J.; Chiu, T. H. (1987-09-28). "Room-temperature operation of hot-electron transistors". Applied Physics Letters. 51 (13): 984–986. doi:10.1063/1.98784. ISSN 0003-6951.
- Levi, A.F.J.; McCall, S.L.; Pearton, S.J.; Logan, R.A. (1993-09-02). "Room temperature operation of submicrometre radius disk laser". Electronics Letters. 29 (18): 1666–1667. doi:10.1049/el:19931109. ISSN 0013-5194.
- Frateschi, N. C.; Levi, A. F. J. (1996-07-15). "The spectrum of microdisk lasers". Journal of Applied Physics. 80 (2): 644–653. doi:10.1063/1.362873. ISSN 0021-8979.
- Gelfand, B. Y.; Schmitt-Rink, S.; Levi, A. F. J. (1989-04-03). "Tunneling in the presence of phonons: A solvable model". Physical Review Letters. 62 (14): 1683–1686. doi:10.1103/PhysRevLett.62.1683. ISSN 0031-9007.
- Seliger, Philip; Mahvash, Mohammad; Wang, Chunming; Levi, A. F. J. (2006-08-01). "Optimization of aperiodic dielectric structures". Journal of Applied Physics. 100 (3). doi:10.1063/1.2221497. ISSN 0021-8979.
- Levi, A. F. J.; Rosen, I. G. (2010). "A Novel Formulation of the Adjoint Method in the Optimal Design of Quantum Electronic Devices". SIAM Journal on Control and Optimization. 48 (5): 3191–3223. doi:10.1137/070708330. ISSN 0363-0129.
- Levi, A. F. J.; Venuti, L. Campos; Albash, T.; Haas, S. (2014-08-25). "Coherent control of non-Markovian photon-resonator dynamics". Physical Review A. 90 (2). arXiv:1408.5844. doi:10.1103/PhysRevA.90.022119. ISSN 1050-2947.
