= Moshe Levy (author) =

Moshe Levy (Hebrew: משה לוי) is an author, and a survivor of the Israeli destroyer "Eilat".

Moshe was born in Iraq in 1948. In 1951, he fled as a child with his parents from Iraq in an airlift organised by Israel, where he now lives with his family.

At age 18, after graduating high school, he was drafted into the Israeli navy and volunteered to serve aboard destroyer "Eilat". The night in 1967 shortly after the Six-Day War that "Eilat" was attacked by Egyptian SS-N-2 Styx missiles, he was one of the survivors of the initial attack that sank the ship. Many of those who survived the initial attack were subsequently killed by other missiles, secondary explosions, or succumbed to sheer exhaustion.

His story about the personal trauma, desperation, loneliness and anxiety in those tragic night hours are brought together in a book, written by Moshe Levy, called "The 48th Soul." The reason for naming his book "The 48th Soul" (or "Haneshama ha 48" in Hebrew) is explained in the book.

Levy is an insurance consultant and a speaker, invited by organizations in Israel to come and tell his personal story. He also worked as a journalist with the weekly publication: " Magazine HaMoshavot" in central Israel. He had a weekly column that became very popular and had many followers. Later on Moshe decided to go back to his main passion of writing books. In July 2015 he published his book: "Sylvie Doesn't Fit" short stories from life.
