= Péter Lévai =

Hungarian physicist (born 1962)

- Born: 8 August 1962 (age 64)
- Education: Eötvös Loránd University
- Occupations: Physicist, academic

Péter Lévai (born 8 August 1962 in Miskolc) is a Hungarian physicist, research professor, director general of HUN-REN Wigner Fizikai Kutatóközpont and a full member of the Hungarian Academy of Sciences.

== Education ==
Péter Lévai was born in 1962 in Miskolc. He graduated in physics from Eötvös Loránd University in 1986 and was a PhD fellow at the MTA Központi Fizikai Kutatóintézet. He received his PhD in 1989 and was a research fellow at Institute for Particle and Nuclear Physics of MTA KFKI, and between 1990 and 1992 he was a research fellow at Duke University and Texas A&M University in the USA. He has taught high-energy nuclear physics at ELTE since 1989 and was awarded a PhD in physics in 1992.

== Academic career ==
From 1994, he was a senior research fellow at MTA KFKI RMKI, and from 1999 to 2010 he was a scientific advisor.

In 1999 he was awarded a doctorate by the Hungarian Academy of Sciences, and in 2000 he habilitated and became a private lecturer at ELTE.

From 2005 to 2012, he was the leader of the Hungarian ALICE group in the high-energy experiment at European Organization for Nuclear Research. From 2010 to 2011, he was deputy director of the MTA KFKI, and in 2011 he became research professor. Since 2012, he has been Director General of the HUN-REN Wigner Research Centre for Physics. In 2010, he was elected a Corresponding Member of the MTA, and in 2016, he was elected a Full Member.

He specializes in nuclear physics, with research interests in the theoretical and experimental study of the strong interaction between elementary particles and the properties of strongly interacting matter, as well as heavy ion collisions.

He is a member of the European Academy of Sciences and Arts and the Academia Europaea.

== Personal life ==
He is married and has one daughter.
