= David Benjamin Levy =

American musicologist

David Benjamin Levy is a musicologist.

He is professor emeritus of music at Wake Forest University. He also served as a visiting professor of musicology at the Eastman School of Music and the University of North Carolina School of the Arts. He is especially distinguished as a Beethoven scholar, but he also deals generally with the classical and romantic periods.

== Bibliography ==
- Levy, David Benjamin (2003). Beethoven: The Ninth Symphony. Yale University Press. ISBN 978-0-300-09964-5.
