= Daniel Levy (pianist) =

Argentine classical pianist

External image
- Daniel Levy

Daniel Levy (born 1947) is an Argentine classical pianist. He is also an author, radio broadcaster and educator.

== Early life ==
Levy was born in Buenos Aires, Argentina. He began playing the piano at age six and received a musical education under the tutorship of Ana Gelber and Vincenzo Scaramuzza, whose former pupils include Martha Argerich and Bruno Leonardo Gelber. He gave his debut performance at age 16, playing a piano recital with works by Bach, Chopin and Schumann. In 1967 he won the Jeunesses Musicales piano competition and in 1969 was announced the winner of the Mozarteum piano competition.

== Professional career ==
Levy has recorded extensively over a 43-year career, with a catalogue of over 50 recordings for the Nimbus Records, Edelweiss Emission and Syntony record labels. His recording career has included a number of notable collaborations with artists that include Dietrich Fischer-Dieskau, the Philharmonia Orchestra, Wolfgang Holzmair and Franco Maggio Ormezowski.

Levy has performed in some of the world's most famous concert halls, including Royal Festival Hall (London), Teatro Colón (Buenos Aires) and Teatro La Fenice (Venice).

His piano playing has been praised for its "lovely, crystalline tone" (Bernard Jacobson, Fanfare), while he himself has been described as "a sensitive yet assertive musician who is profoundly committed to his art" (Ian Lace, Fanfare).

== Other activities ==
Daniel Levy is the author of the books Euphony – The Sound of Life (Cassiopeia, 1986), Eternal Beauty (Cassiopeia, 1988) and Echoes of the Wind (Editorial Dunken, 2007).

The book Euphony – The Sound of Life is currently being used as the main text in the Euphony – Implementing Teacher Knowledge project (2005–2007) as part of the European Union's Socrates-Grundtvig programme. Levy is also the main tutor of this programme. Levy's latest literary offering, Echoes of the Wind, is an introspective novel that is accompanied by a CD of selected classical pieces chosen by the author.

Levy is the co-founder of the International Academy of Euphony, an organization dedicated to the study of sound and its effects on the human psyche.

== Discography ==
=== Edelweiss Emission recordings ===
- BRAHMS: Variations On A Theme by R. Schumann Op. 9, 3 Intermezzi Op. 117, 6 Klavierstücke Op. 118
- BRAHMS: THE SONATAS FOR VIOLIN AND PIANO, D.Levy – piano, N.Chumachenco – violin
- SCHUMANN: THE COMPLETE PIANO WORKS Vol.1, Papillons Op.2, Impromptu on a theme by Clara Wieck Op. 5, Fantasie in C major, Op.17
- SCHUMANN: THE COMPLETE PIANO WORKS Vol.2, Drei Romanzen Op.28, Allegro Op.8, Sonata in F Sharp Minor Op.11
- SCHUMANN: THE CHAMBER MUSIC WITH PIANO, Violinsonaten Op. 105 & 121, Märchenerzählungen Op. 132, Drei Romanzen Op. 94, Adagio and Allegro Op. 70, Fantasiestücke Op. 73, Märchenbilder Op. 113, Daniel Levy – piano, N. Chumachenco – violin, viola, A. Morf – clarinet, P. Borgonovo – oboe, M. Rota – horn (2 CD)
- SCHUMANN: LIEDER on poems by Heine, Lenau and Geibel, Wolfgang Holzmair – baritone, Daniel Levy – piano
- CLARA WIECK SCHUMANN: Piano Works
- SCHUBERT: Piano Sonata in G Major D894, Impromptus D899
- GRIEG: LYRIC PIECES, 66 LYRIC PIECES, SONATA Op. 7 (3 CD)
- GRIEG: THE SONATAS FOR VIOLIN AND PIANO, Sonata in F Major, Sonata in G Major, Sonata in C Minor, Nicolás Chumachenco – violin, Daniel Levy – piano
- CHOPIN: NOCTURNES
- WALZER: BRAHMS, 16 Walzer Op.39; CHOPIN, 5 Walzer; LISZT, Valse Impromptu, Mephisto Waltz No.1; SCRIABIN, Valse Op.1, Valse Op.Post., Valse op.38
- A PIANO RECITAL FOR ITALY, music by Liszt
- A PIANO RECITAL FOR THE WORLD'S CHILDREN, various composers (LIVE RECORDING)
- A PIANO RECITAL FOR VENICE, various composers
- BRAHMS: PIANO CONCERTO No.1, CHACONNA By Bach For The Left Hand, Daniel Levy – piano, Dietrich Fischer-Dieskau – conductor, Philharmonia Orchestra
- SCHUMANN: PIANO CONCERTO Op. 54 in A Minor, Konzertstücke Op.92 (Introduzione ed Allegro Appassionato); Schön Hedwig Op.106, Zwei Balladen for declamation and piano, Daniel Levy – piano, Philharmonia Orchestra, Dietrich Fischer-Dieskau – conductor and declamation, (Daniel Levy's Edition – A Piano for Human Concord)
- SCHUBERT: Piano Sonata in B Flat D960, Moments Musicaux D780, (Daniel Levy's Edition – A Piano for Human Concord)
- BRAHMS: CELLO SONATAS, Sonata No.1 in E Minor Op.38, Sonata No.2 in F Major Op.99, Franco Maggio Ormezowski – cello, Daniel Levy – piano, (Daniel Levy's Edition – A Piano for Human Concord)
- ALMA ARGENTINA: GUASTAVINO Mariana, El Ceibo, Bailecito, La Siesta, Tres Preludios: El Patio, El Sauce, Los Gorriones, La Casa, Tierra Linda; GINASTERA Tres Danzas Argentinas, Milonga; RAMIREZ Alfonsina y el mar; GARDEL El día que me quieras; PIAZZOLLA Tres preludios, Contrabajísimo (Daniel Levy's Edition – A Piano for Human Concord)

=== Nimbus Records recordings ===
- Schumann: Piano Music Vol. 1, Davidsbündlertänze Op. 6, Kinderszenen Op. 15
- Schumann: Piano Music Vol. 2, Album für die Jugend Op. 68
- Schumann: Piano Music Vol. 3, Fantasiestücke Op. 12, Piano Sonata No. 2 Op. 22, Klavierstücke Op. 32
- Schumann: Piano Music Vol. 4, Gesänge der Frühe Op. 133, Waldszenen Op. 82, Nachtstücke Op. 23
- Schumann: Piano Music Vol. 5, Carnaval Op. 9, Faschingsschwank aus Wien Op. 26, Arabeske Op. 18

=== Syntony Recordings ===
The 7 Tones of Balance and Musical Ecology of the Mind:

- Vol. 1: Strength
- Vol. 2: Positive Optimism
- Vol. 3: Courage
- Vol. 4: Enthusiasm
- Vol. 5: Joy
- Vol. 6: Stillness
- Vol. 7: Compassion
- Vol. 8: Musical Ecology of the Mind
