= Enrico Deaglio =

Italian journalist, writer and broadcaster

Enrico Deaglio (born 11 April 1947) is an Italian journalist, writer and TV presenter.

== Biography ==
Deaglio was born in Turin, where he graduated in medicine (June 1971) and worked in the Mauriziano Hospital.

In the mid-1970s, he started his journalism career for the communist newspaper Lotta continua, of which he was editor from 1977 to 1982. Later he worked for numerous national newspapers and magazines, including La Stampa, Il Manifesto, Panorama, Epoca and l'Unità. From 1985 to 1986 he was the editor of the newspaper Reporter.

Since the later 1980s, he has worked for the news show Mixer on RAI TV, focusing in particular on the Sicilian mafia and events Abroad. In the 1990s he hosted several shows on Rai Tre, such as Milano, Italia (January–June 1994), Ragazzi del '99 (1999), Così va il mondo, Vento del Nord and L'Elmo di Scipio. From 1997 to 2008 he was editor of the weekly Diario.

In 2006 his TV documentary Uccidete la democrazia! (Kill Democracy!), where he suggested that electronic votes in the 2006 Italian general elections were manipulated in favour of Silvio Berlusconi's party, House of Freedoms, generated significant controversies. Deaglio's theory was subsequently discarded by an official recount of ballots by the Italian Parliament.

His brother, Mario Deaglio, is an economist at the University of Turin.

== Selected bibliography ==
- Cinque storie quasi vere (1989)
- La banalità del bene: Storia di Giorgio Perlasca (1991)
- Il figlio della professoressa Colomba (1992)
- Raccolto rosso: La mafia, l'Italia (1992)
- Besame mucho: Diario di un anno abbastanza crudele (1995)
- Bella ciao: Diario di un anno che poteva anche andare peggio (1996)
- Lontano e a zonzo (1998)
- Patria 1978-2008 (2009)
- Storia vera e terribile tra Sicilia e America (2015)
- La zia Irene e l'anarchico Tresca (2018)
