= Jenő Lévai =

Hungarian-Jewish writer (1892–1983)

Jenő Lévai (Budapest, April 26, 1892–Budapest, June 29, 1983) was a Hungarian journalist and Holocaust survivor, whose writing dealt mainly with Hungarian Jews.

== Works ==
- Jenő Levai, ed. (1968). Hungarian Jewry and the papacy. Pope Pius XII did not remain silent. Reports, documents and records from church and state archives assembled by Jenő Levai. Translated by J.R. Foster, etc. [With plates, including portraits and facsimiles.] Translated by J.R. Foster. London: Sands and Co. pp. xii. 131 pages, 8°. OCLC 40465.
