= David Levy (economist) =

American economist and author

David A. Levy is an American economist and author. He is chairman of the Jerome Levy Forecasting Center LLC, an economic consultancy.

== Education ==
Levy holds a B.A. in Mathematics from Williams College and a Master's degree in Business Administration from Columbia University.

== Career ==
Levy was appointed by President Clinton to the commission to Study Capital Budgeting in 1997 and served on the federal government's Competitive Policy Council Infrastructure Subcouncil. He has given briefings and testimony to members of Congress.

== Publications ==
Levy is the coauthor, with Jay Levy, of Profits and the Future of American Society, published by HarperCollins in 1983. Forbes magazine praised the book for explaining "why squeezing business profits for the alleged benefit of the poor or of the working man is a self-defeating exercise. It leads not to the satisfaction of human needs but to inflation and unemployment."

- Uncle Sam Won’t Go Broke - The Misguided Sovereign Debt Hysteria (2010), co-author Srinivas Thiruvadanthai, The Jerome Levy Forecasting Center
- Profits and the Future of American Society, (1983), HarperCollins
