= Dan Levy (journalist) =

American national sports journalist (born 1978)

Dan Levy (born Daniel Jason Levy; born February 11, 1978) is an American national sports journalist who was the national lead writer for Bleacher Report, one of the world's leading sports websites, as well as a radio host on The Morning B/Reakaway on SiriusXM's Bleacher Report Radio. He has appeared as a guest analyst on numerous TV and radio programs — from CNN to the NBC Sports Network.

Levy (no relation to the actor or comedian of the same name or the current chairman of Premier League football side Tottenham Hotspur) was born and raised in Marlton, New Jersey. He attended Rutgers University, where, as part of the sports information office, he began his career. Levy is also a graphic designer, whose work includes the creation of the Rutgers Athletics logo.

== Bleacher Report ==
Levy was national lead writer at Bleacher Report from 2011 to 2015. He was the first hire of Bleacher Report's Lead Writer initiative. During that period, he amassed more than 20.6 million reads. His work was routinely featured on the front page of BleacherReport.com and in the B/R Team Stream app, as well as other Turner Broadcasting outlets, including CNN.com and HLN.com. He covered every sport, major event and sports scandal, including NFL, NBA, MLB, NCAA, FIFA and the Olympics.

== Bleacher Report Radio, Sirius XM ==
Levy was the host of The Morning B/Reakaway, a national radio show, from 2014 to 2015. He co-hosted the program for 10 months, then serving for two months as a solo host, every weekday, from 7-10 am ET. In addition to hosting, he formulated daily topics and booked guests, including some of the top names in sports, media and pop culture.

== Awful Announcing ==
Levy is staff writer (from 2015 to present) for AwfulAnnouncing.com, a sports media website.

== On the DL podcast ==
From 2008 to 2011, Levy hosted the critically acclaimed On the DL Podcast, one of the first sports media and pop culture podcasts in the industry. He recorded, produced, edited and published the daily podcast with listeners around the country. In all, he created 555 shows over nearly half a decade of production, interviewing many top names at every major sports media outlet in the country. From Tony Kornheiser to former Gov. Ed Rendell.

== Sporting News, The Sporting Blog ==
From 2009 to 2010, Levy was a writer for Sporting News' sports and culture website The Sporting Blog. He became a regular contributor, then a full-time staff member, writing nearly 550 articles. He also contributed to Sporting News' print and digital projects, including a weekly media column entitled "Press Coverage."

== 609Design ==
From 1997 to 2015, Levy was creator and lead designer of a company that started as a college side project and turned into a successful media, print and digital design firm. He created dozens of logos and word marks for companies around the world, from local shops in New Jersey to global brands in Africa. Specializing in print design, the firm has created many publications over the years, including everything from corporate annual reports to multimedia presentations to personalized, custom wedding invitations and birth announcements.

== Rutgers University Athletics ==
From 1997 to 2007, Levy worked in the Rutgers University Athletic Communications office. He designed the Rutgers R, seen all across the state of New Jersey at the University's various campuses. He created and designed all the athletic department's publications, including media guides, posters and football and basketball game day programs. He designed both the Rutgers football helmets and initial FieldTurf re-design, as well as several versions of the Rutgers basketball court. He worked closely with marketing and promotional staff on several high profile initiatives, including multiple Heisman Trophy campaigns. He also worked closely, as a problem-solving asset, with local and national media during multiple national scandals.

== Contributing work ==
Levy is a regular contributor to CSN (Comcast SportsNet) Philly as a frequent guest of the network's digital program Lunch Break. He also appeared as a guest on the network's news talk program Philly Sports Talk. He is a former contributor to both The Washington Post and The Philadelphia Inquirer. He also wrote for the Philadelphia blog The 700 Level.

== Charity work ==
Levy has initiated several charity campaigns, including two for Children's Hospital of Philadelphia (CHOP). The campaigns have helped raise tens of thousands of dollars.
