= Levitzki =

Levitzki or Levitsky (Ukrainian: Левицький Łevyćkyj, Russian: Левицкий Levickij, Polish: Lewicki, Hebrew: לויצקי) is a surname, which is derived from the Hebrew name Levi meaning "joined to" in Hebrew. Notable people with the surname include:

- Alexander Levitzki (born 1940), Israeli biochemist
- Jacob Levitzki (1904–1956), Jewish Ukrainian-Israeli mathematician
- Mischa Levitzki (1898–1941), Jewish Ukrainian-American concert pianist

It can also refer to:

- Levitzki radical
- Levitzky's theorem
- Hopkins–Levitzki theorem

== See also ==
- Lewicki (f. Lewicka, pl. Lewici)
- Levitsky (f. Levitska, Levitskaya)
- Levitzky
- Levitin
- Levi
