= Lewicki =

Lewicki (feminine form: Lewicka) is a Polish-language surname. The surname may have several origins. It can be a patronymic surname from a diminutive of the Polish given name Lew "Lion" or the nickname Lewek "Left-handed". It can also be derived from either of the towns called Lewiczyn or, as a Jewish surname, from the meaning "of the Levites".

Other transliterations of the same surname include Levitzki, Levitsky and Lewycky/Lewycka

Notable people with the surname include:

- Anatol Lewicki (1841–1899), Polish historian
- Anders Lewicki (born 1967), Swedish footballer
- Artie Lewicki (born 1992), American baseball player
- Danny Lewicki (1931–2018), Ukrainian-Canadian ice hockey player
- Jakub Lewicki (born 2005), Polish footballer
- Jan Lewicki (1795–1871), Polish artist
- Karin Lewicki (born 1977), American writer
- Karolina Lewicka (born 1981), Polish filmmaker and writer
- Marta Lewicka (born 1972), American professor of mathematics
- Olga Lewicka (born 1975), Polish born visual artist
- Oscar Lewicki (born 1992), Swedish footballer
- Pawel Lewicki (born 1953), cognitive psychologist
- Simon Lewicki, known as Groove Terminator, Australian electronic music artist
- Tobias Lewicki (born 1993), Swedish footballer

== Other ==
- Cegielnia Lewicka, village in Poland
