= Levytsky =

Levytsky or Levytskyi or Levytska is a surname of Ukrainian origin and may refer to

- Dmytro Levytsky (1877–1942), a lawyer and major political figure
- Halyna (Olena) Levytska (1901–1949), piano performer and a music teacher
- Ivan Nechuy-Levytsky, a Ukrainian writer
- Kost Levytsky, the head of government of the West Ukrainian People's Republic in 1918–1919
- Maksym Levytskyi (born 1972), a retired Ukrainian footballer
- Mykhailo Levytsky, a metropolitan of Lviv
- Orest Levytsky (1848–1922), a Ukrainian historian, ethnographer
- Tetiana Levytska-Shukvani (born 1990), a Ukrainian-born Georgian judoka
- Volodymyr Levytsky (1872–1956), a Ukrainian mathematician

== See also ==
- Levitsky, a Russian version
- Levitzky, a Jewish version
- Lewicki, a Polish version
