= Levitsky =

Levitsky is a surname. Notable people with the surname include:

- Fred Momotenko-Levitsky (born 1970), Dutch composer
- Grigory Andreevich Levitsky (1878–1942), Russian and Soviet plant cytogeneticist
- Maxym Levitsky (born 1972), Ukrainian footballer
- Melvyn Levitsky (1938-2025), American diplomat
- Mykhajlo Levitsky (1774–1858), Ukrainian archbishop
- Rafail Levitsky (1847–1940), Russian artist
- Sergey Levitsky (1819–1898), Russian photographer
- Stepan Levitsky (1876–1924), Russian chess master
- Steven Levitsky (born 1968), American political scientist

== See also ==
- Levitzky
- Levytsky
