= Levitzky =

Levitzky is a surname descending from the name Lev, East Slavic form of Leo. Notable people with the surname include:

- Dmitry Levitzky (1735–1822), painter
- Károly Levitzky (1885–1978), rower
- Steven Levitsky (1968–present), political scientist

== See also ==
- Levitsky, a Russian version
- Levytsky, a Ukrainian version
- Lewicki, a Polish version
