= Lewiczyn =

Lewiczyn may refer to:

- Lewiczyn, Grójec County, Poland
- Lewiczyn, Mława County, Poland
