= Rafail Levitsky =

Russian artist and photographer (1847–1940)

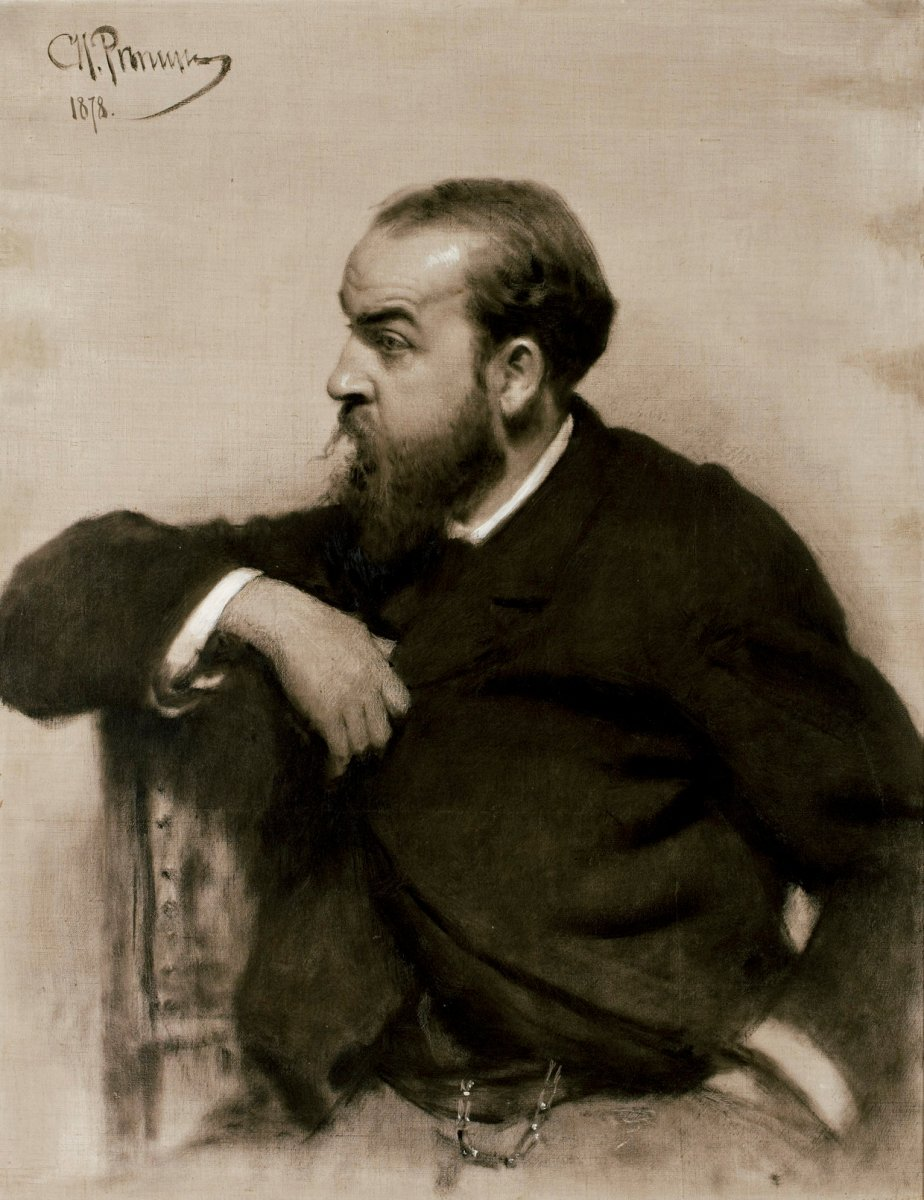
- Ilya Repin, Rafail Levitsky, 1878, oil on canvas; Ateneum, Helsinki
- Born: Rafail Sergeevich Levitsky c. 1840–1847
- Died: c. 1937–1940
- Education: Imperial Academy of Arts (1877)
- Known for: Painting
- Movement: Peredvizhniki

Rafail (Note: Also spelled Rafael or Raphael.) Sergeevich Levitsky (Russian: Рафаил Сергеевич Левицкий; c. 1840–1847 – c. 1937–1940) was a Russian painter in the Realist style, active during Tsars Alexander III and Nicholas II's reigns. The son to pioneering portrait photographer Sergey Levitsky, he was a second-rate master most remembered as friend to contemporaneous artists Ilya Repin and Vasily Polenov.

== Origins ==
Levitsky was born into a wealthy aristocratic family. He was married to Anna Vasilevna Olsufevsky. He was the second cousin of Aleksandr Ivanovich Herzen (1812–1870), the writer and outstanding public figure; and son to Sergei Lvovich Levitsky (1819–1898), one of the founders of photography in Russia and Europe's early photographic pioneers.

He was friend to author Count Lev Nikolayevich Tolstoy (1828–1910) who visited and stayed with him and his wife on several occasions. His letters to his artist friend Vasily Dmitrievich Polenov are a personal account of many of the key figures in Russian art who exhibited during their lifetime.

== Education ==
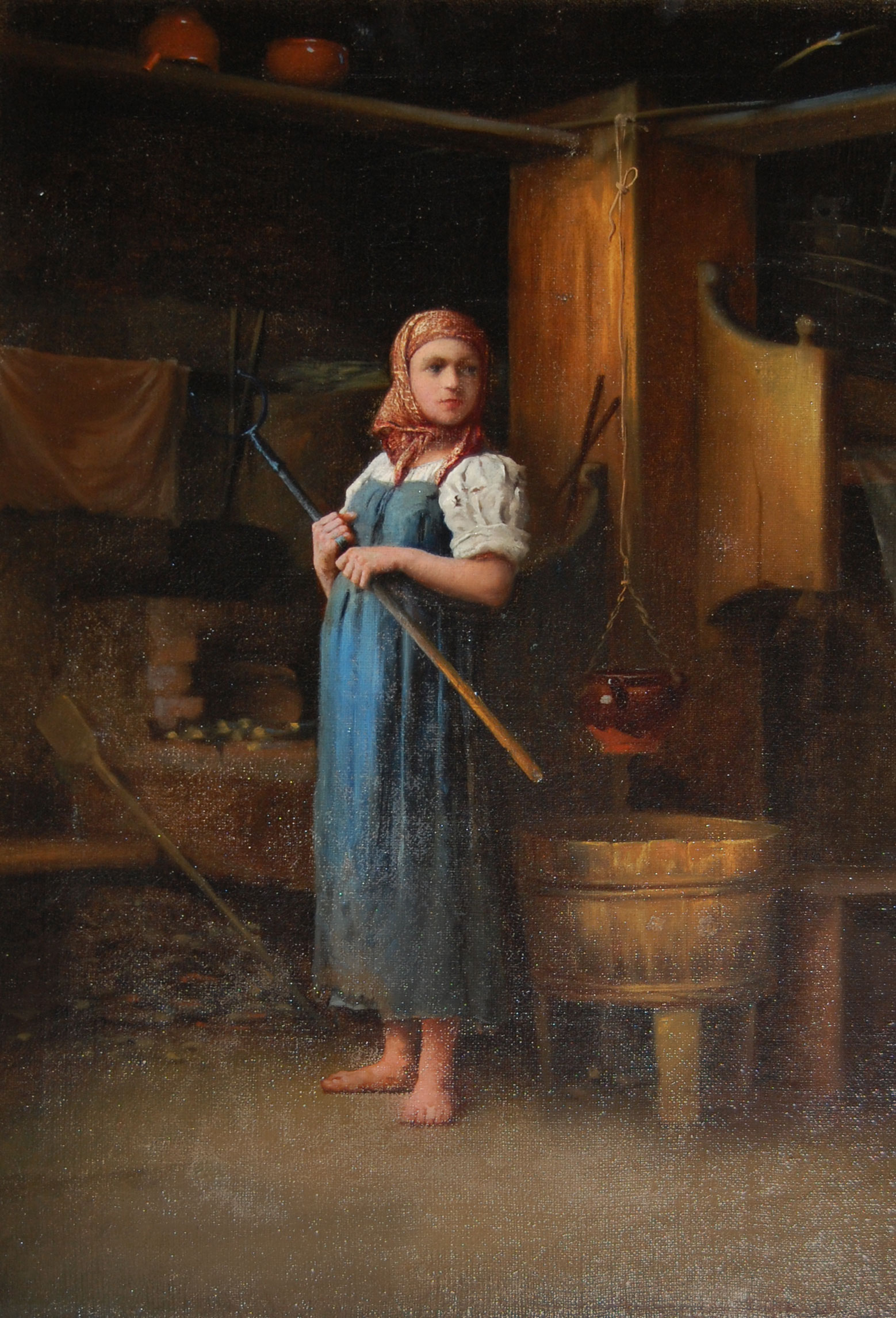
A Village Girl, 1877; Nekrasov Apartment Museum, St. Petersburg

In 1866, Levitsky began his artistic studies at the Imperial Academy of Arts in Saint Petersburg as a free-student. While there, Levitsky established friendship with his classmates, Vasily Polenov and Ilya Repin.

Levitsky received medals in 1867 - 2 silver and in 1872 - a minor and two major honours.

In 1877 he received a rank of "class artist of third stage".

== Teacher ==
Levitsky was a Professor of Drawing and Painting on Porcelain at the School of Imperial Society of Honouring Visual Arts from 1884 until the school was closed by the Soviets in 1918.

His career is documented in a report written by request of the Committee of Imperial Society of Honouring Visual Arts by Nickolay Makarenko, published in Saint Petersburg in 1914.

== The Association of Peredvizhniki Artists ==
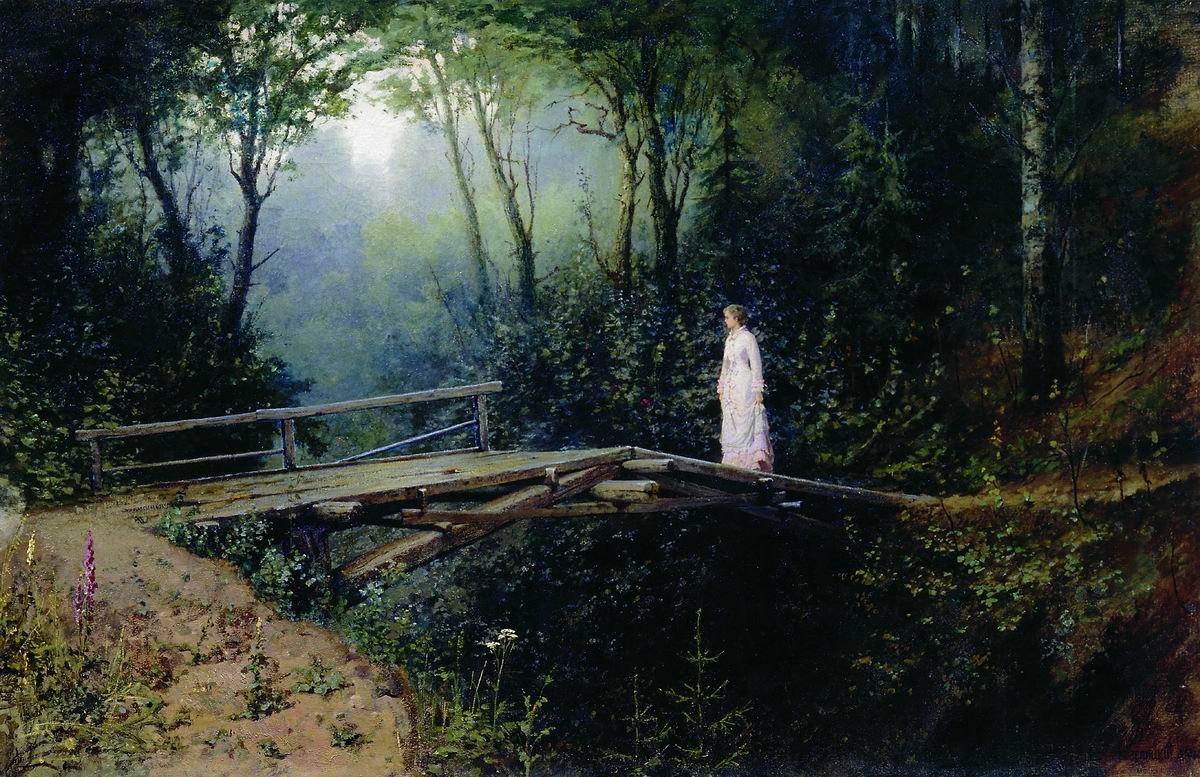
The Bridge in the Woods, c. 1885-1886, oil on canvas; Stavropol Krai Museum of Fine Arts

In 1880, Levitsky joined the free-thinking "Association of Peredvizhniki Artists" who sought to move away from the academic formalism of the official Academy.

Levitsky exhibited with the Peredvizhniki (Itinerant) Movement from 1880 to 1894.

His artistic career took him throughout Russia. After the opening in 1883 of the Rostov Museum of Church Antiquities his name appears twice in the Museum's Book of Visitors (started in 1886). Levitsky visited this cultural centre of old Russian architecture, church and folk art in 1900 and 1904.

A painting of the Interior of the Redeemer Church "na-senyah" found in the Kremlin of Rostov was painted in 1904 by Levitsky and is today at the Tretyakov Gallery, Moscow.

In 1885, 1896, and 1907 he travelled to Italy where he painted genre and impressionistic scenes en plein air.

In November 1914, he documented a scene of Russian forces fighting in the Silesian Offensive in World War I.

== Friendship with Vasily Dmitrievich Polenov (1844-1927) ==
Throughout his life Levitsky was good friends with fellow Itinerant artist Vasily Dmitrievich Polenov. Polenov's freshness of color combined with artistic finish of composition greatly influenced Levitsky's own landscape painting style and treatment.

When Levitsky was a bachelor, he lived and worked together with Polenov in "Devich'e Pole" (the name of the street "Maiden's Field"), in an attic of the Olsufevsky House. This house is illustrated by Polenov in his painting "Grandmother's garden" (1878).

While living there Levitsky would meet and marry Anna Vasilevna Olsufevsky. He would also meet Leo Tolstoy and become good friends with the world-famous author discussing Tolstoy's theories on art and his personal connection to the art and artists of the day. Ultimately, Levitsky in 1896 would paint Tolstoy's portrait.

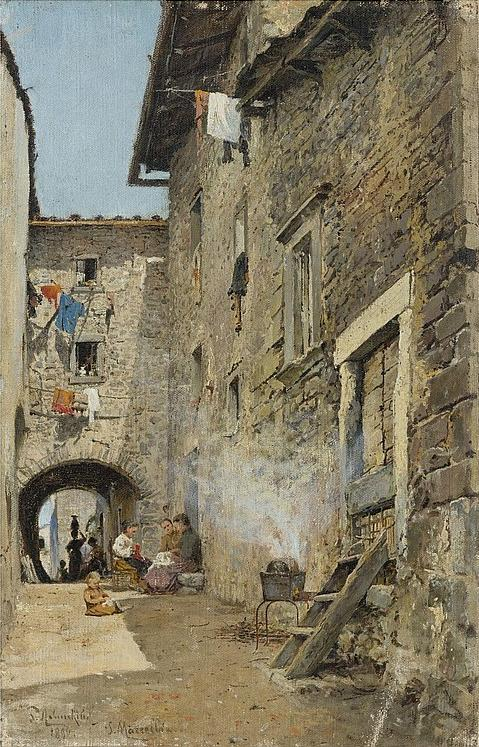
View of Mazzolada di Lison, Veneto, Italy. by Rafail Sergeevich Levitsky.(1896) The Di Rocco Wieler Private Collection, Toronto, Canada

== Levitsky Polenov Correspondence ==
As Levitsky lived and worked in Saint Petersburg we are given insight into the art exhibitions he attended and wrote about in letters to Vasily Dmitrievich Polenov.

In a letter sent to Polenov in Moscow, Levitsky writes about an academic exhibition which occurred on September, 18th, 1869 about the sculptor Opekushin Alexander Mikhailovich (1838–1923) who sculpted a bust of the artist Mikhail Osipovich Mikeshin (1835–1896). He writes:

"The exhibition has been open since yesterday, but there are not a lot of people attending, and those of the public who are attending do not seem to like the exhibition either. Did I tell you about a bust of Mikeshin made by some unknown sculptor named Opekushin. This sculpture is remarkable in its work and the likeness to the face and body of Mikeshin... would this be a painting, I would have gambled that it was done by Mikeshin himself. This same fellow Opekushin also showed a bust of Komisarov".

At a third Academic Exhibition in St. Petersburg where V.M. Vasnetsov (1848–1926) exhibited the picture "Tea drinking at a tavern" Levitsky who visited the exhibition, wrote on February, 8th, 1874 to Polenov, "Vasnetsova whom you, obviously, know, a miracle from miracles…"

Writing to Polenov about the artist Arkhip Ivanovich Kuinji's (1842–1910) work "View of the Isaakievsky cathedral" having visited the academic exhibition in 1869, Levitsky saw the beginnings of what would be Kuinji's use of special light effects to paint nature and achieved astonishing results. Levitsky writes: "A. Kuinji has painted a landscape of the Neva river with the view of the Isaakievsky cathedral which is perfectly realized …"

== Friendship with Ilya Repin (1844-1930) ==
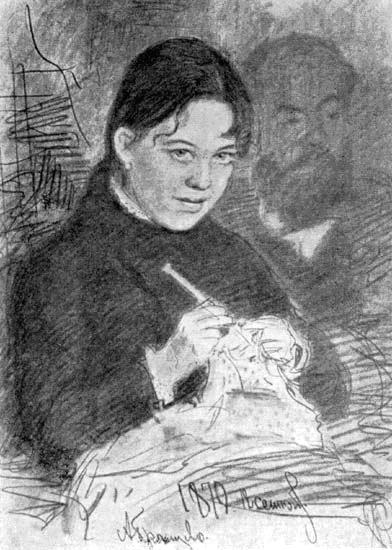
Levitsky (in the background) and Emiliya Prakhova, drawn by Ilya Repin, 1879

Levitsky was classmate and close friends with fellow Itinerant artist Ilya Repin. Repin sketched Levitsky's image and painted his portrait in 1878 showing early Repin's ability to not just paint faces, but rather to paint people fully, revealing his models in their natural state and how they communicated.

When Repin settled in Moscow in 1876, he and Levitsky would travel to the Abramtsevo Colony, the country estate of Savva Mamontov located north of Moscow. Savva was one of the most famous Russian patrons of art of the late 19th century who founded an artist's union in Ambratsevo.

Repin's "On a Bridge in Abramtsevo" (1879) and Levitsky's "The Bridge in the Woods" (1885–1886) are remarkable achievements showing different approaches of these two great artists painting the same subject matter (a bridge) in the same location (Abramtsevo).

In 1920, Ilya Repin donated his portrait of Levitsky along with a collection of other works by him to the Finnish National Gallery.

Levitsky's portrait by Ilya Repin is on permanent display at the Finnish National Gallery, Ateneum Art Gallery, Helsinki, Finland.

== Friendship with author Count Lev Nikolayevich Tolstoy (1828-1910) ==
From February to March, 1896, and from February to March, 1897, Leo Tolstoy visited Rafail Levitsky and his wife Anna Vasilevna Olsufesky, at the Olsufevsky's estate, Nicholskoe, near Moscow. Once he spent two weeks with them and another time he stayed with them for an entire month.

On one such visit, Rafail welcomed Tolstoy hospitably into his workshop and discussed painting Tolstoy's portrait. The session took place, on the second floor of the Nicholskoe's house. It is told that Levitsky, while standing, drew on an easel and chose to make a sketch viewing Tolstoy's right profile. To facilitate the posing, someone read aloud from a Henryk Sienkiewicz (1846–1916) novel. The session lasted for one and a half hours. With the permission of Tolstoy, the final drawing was made into an engraving and sold in shops throughout Russia.

In the month of May 1898, Leo Tolstoy travelled to Grinevka to visit the estate of his son, Count I. L. Tolstoy. While living there, he once again visited his friend, the landlord, Rafail S. Levitsky, where he fell seriously ill with severe dysentery and remained there for ten days. In his Journal translated by Rose Strunsky in 1917 he writes of this time: "I went with Sonya (my daughter-in-law) to the Tsurikov's, Aphremov's, and the Levitsky's. I have a very pleasant impression and fell in love with many; but fell ill and did not do my work and made a lot of fuss both for Levitsky and the household."

== Photographer ==
Levitsky's father was Sergei Lvovich Levitsky (1819–1898, Moscow, Russian: Сергей Львович Львов-Левицкий), who is considered the patriarch of Russian photography and one of Europe's most important early photographic pioneers, inventors and innovators.

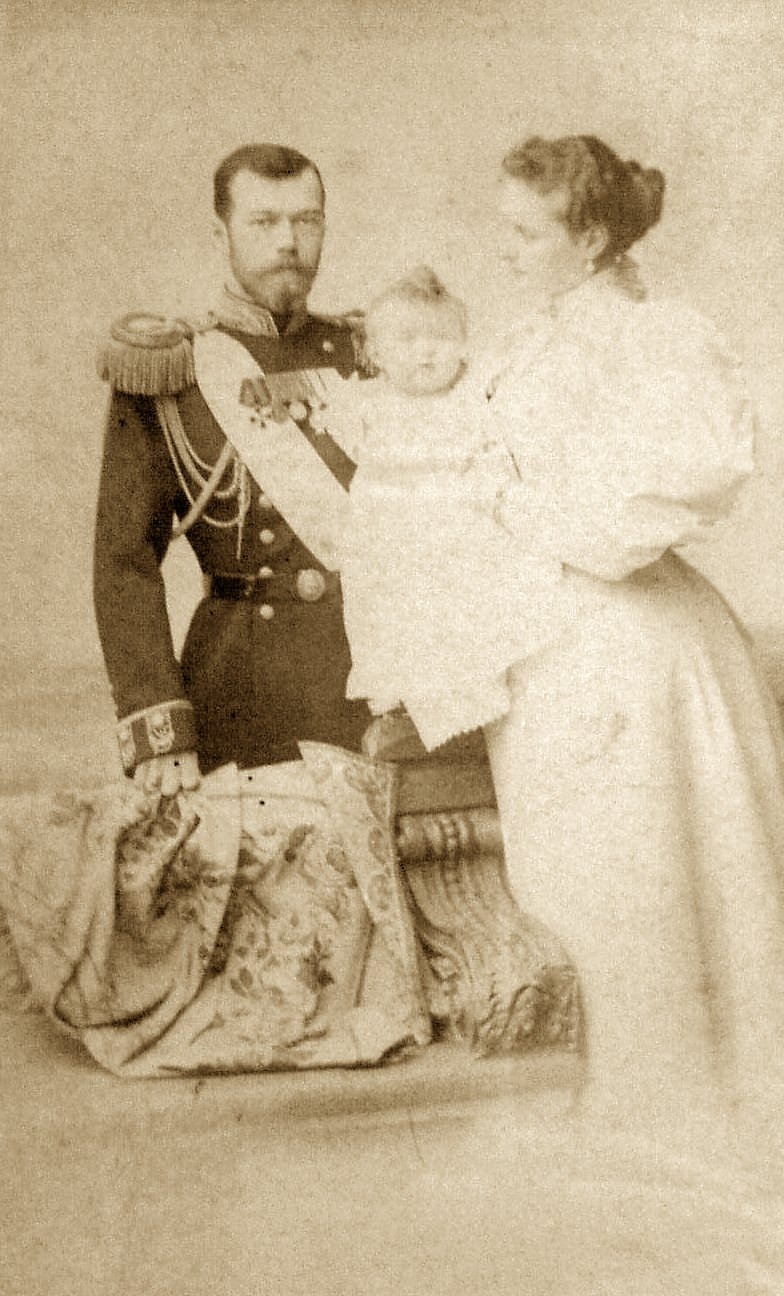
Czar Nicholas II, Empress Alexandra, and daughter Olga. by Sergei Lvovich Levitsky.(1896) The Di Rocco Wieler Private Collection, Toronto, Canada

With a career that began in the 1840s, working as a daguerreotypist in Germany and Italy; Levitsky's father knew Daguerre personally, and introduced the term ‘light painting’ to Russia. It was he who first proposed the idea to artificially light subjects in a studio setting using electric lighting along with daylight.

With a working life that spanned fifty years, Sergei Levitsky distinguished himself in the technical sphere of photographic development. It was he who designed a bellows camera which significantly improved the process of focusing, and it was he who introduced interchangeable decorative backgrounds, as well as the retouching of negatives to reduce or eliminate technical deficiencies.

Sergei is perhaps best known for a series of photographs of famous artists, writers and public figures (included among these notable figures were Nikolai Nekrasov, Ivan Turgenev, Ivan Goncharov, Vladimir Sollogub, Fedor Tyutchev, Peter Vyazemsky, Alexander Strugovshchikov, Vasily Botkin, Ivan Panaev, Pavel Annenkov, Dmitry Grigorovich, Alexander Herzen, Sergey Volkonsky, and Leo Tolstoy). It is perhaps this association that led Nikolai Alekseevich Nekrasov (1821–1878) to purchase a painting by Rafail Levitsky that hangs in the living room of the N.A. Nekrasov Apartment Museum to this day.

Sergei Levitsky was also one of the founders of Russian's first Photographic Societies, a writer of articles for the Russian magazine "Photograph" and was actively involved in organizing national and international photographic exhibitions throughout his lifetime. He wrote memoirs in two volumes entitled, Reminiscences of an Old Photographer (1892) and How I Became a Photographer (1896). He is buried in St. Petersburg's Smolenskoye Cemetery.

=== Paris studio ===
Between 1859 and 1864 Sergei Levitsky operated a photographic studio at 22, rue de Choiseul in Paris formerly the address for American daguerreotypist Warren Thompson (aka Warren-Thompson) and joined the Société Française de Photographie.

Levitsky and Warren-Thompson were associated 1847-49 both making large format daguerreotypes. Thompson opened a studio at 22 rue Choiseul in 1853.

In 1864 Levitsky in turn sold out to Augustin Aimé Joseph Le Jeune whose cards carried the Levitsky name and the information that he was the new owner/successor (i.e., "Lejeune succr") until at least 1867 and Lejeune reused negatives made by Levitsky as well as making his own images.

Lejeune also operated a studio at 106 Rue de Rivoli associated there with a relative Denis Victor Adolphe Le Jeune from 1867.

Confusion as to the operation of Levitsky's studio in Paris has arisen from the reference to "Levitsky", "M. Levitsky" and "Maison Levitsky" on Lejeune's cartes de visites and cabinet cards with his ownership and authorship printed usually on the lower right hand side, as "Le Jeune Succ'r".

By 1872 Le Jeune was operating at 350 Rue St Honoré and in turn after the Le Jeunes sold the Rue de Rivoli studio to Auguste La Planquais in 1873 and the following year the Rue St Honore studio to Léon Abraham Marius Joliot.

Le Jeune was listed as a member of the Société Française de Photographie until 1885 as was Levitsky but the latter is most likely a confusion with the exit date of Lejeune.

In 1864 Levitsky wrote about his Paris career in The Russian Magazine "Photograph" (1864, № 3-4) in which he described his great success and artistic triumph which "brought to his Paris studio daily orders of some 1500 requests; many of which could not be filled".

Showing in practice that the skillful combination of both natural and artificial light allowed one to create interesting effects, Levitsky's photographs became recognized throughout Europe for their mastery.

Following his father's lead, Levitsky worked alongside his father in Paris placing his Russian monogram Russian: Р Л; on the carte de visite (CDV) photo cards when his hand was involved in the process of taking the photograph.

In 1864 when his father closed the Levitsky studio in Paris, Levitsky returned to Russia with his father.

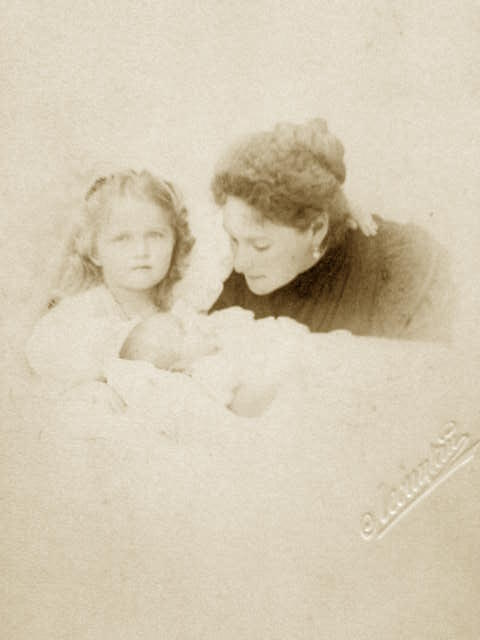
Czarina Alexandra with Olga and Maria, by Rafail Sergeevich Levitsky (1899). The Di Rocco Wieler Private Collection, Toronto, Canada

=== St. Petersburg studio ===
The Levitsky St. Petersburg studio of the 1890s was a father-son enterprise. Photo cards of this time have the distinctive Levitsky name 'and Son' Russian: Левицкий и сын both written as a signature and printed on their backs.

Upon his father's death, Levitsky continued the operation and tradition of the Levitsky portrait studio taking the now famous photos of Czar Nicholas II and Czarina Alexandra and their children Grand Duchess Olga Nikolaevna of Russia, Grand Duchess Tatiana Nikolaevna of Russia, Grand Duchess Maria Nikolaevna of Russia, Grand Duchess Anastasia Nikolaevna of Russia, and Alexei Nikolaevich, Tsarevich of Russia. So popular were the photos of the Romanovs that they were reproduced individually for public consumption in an "Edition A Bon Marché" by Levitsky.

While running the St. Petersburg studio Levitsky began the tradition of taking photos of everyday Russian actors and everyday Russian people while continuing the Studio's resume of taking photos of more well known Russians including Grand Duke Michael Alexandrovich of Russia, Russian General Aleksei Nikolaievitch Kouropatkine and Pyotr Ilyich Tchaikovsky.

Levitsky took part in numerous international and Russian photographic exhibitions, sometimes serving on the jury. His works received multiple awards in international exhibitions.

The Levitsky Studio was located in Moika River Embankment, 30 (1860s), Nevsky Prospect, 28 (1890s), and Kazanskaya Street, 3 (1898, the house is not preserved).

The Levitsky St. Petersburg Studio remained in operation until it was closed by the Soviets in 1918.

=== Photography's first Artist ===
Levitsky is considered to be the first artist in history to be also a fine art photographer. During his lifetime many of the Levitsky famous photographic portraits became partial or complete replacements of the model by artists, lithographers, illustrators and even engravers as in the case of Levitsky's portrait of Alexander III which was used on the Russian ruble bank note.

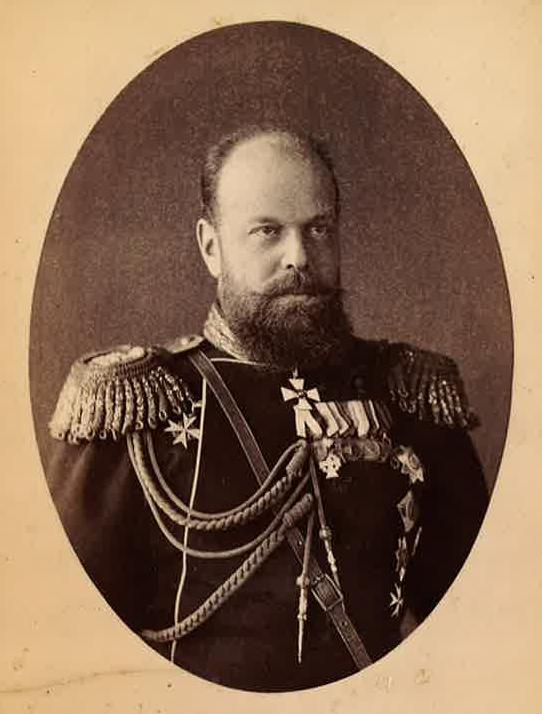
Alexander III. by Sergei Lvovich Levitsky and Rafail Sergeevich Levitsky.(1885) The Di Rocco Wieler Private Collection, Toronto, Canada

However, the Levitsky Studio's lasting importance is found in their ability to understand and exploit the relationship between art and photography; understanding that it could be possible that a photographer using a mechanical device that creates the image, could impose their personal spirit into the finished photograph.

For the Studio believed that it was not simply a process of taking the most famous photographs of the who's who of European and North American society but an artistic endeavour and pursuit to capture the essence of the sitter and relay this through the photographic image captured.

Levitsky's ability to understand, apply and build upon the scientific photographic advancements developed by his father would begin to establish Levitsky's photography as a worthy form of artistic expression; no less effective than a painting or a sculpture.

His achievements preceded famous artists as photographers such as Edgar Degas who began taking photographs in 1895 and Man Ray who would not produce his first significant photographs until 1918.

Levitsky's photos are the first to show images of sitters in naturalistic poses, soft lighting, within naturalistic backgrounds, and expressing real sentiments like joy and laughter or tenderness as in the photo of Czarina Alexandra with Olga and Maria (1899).

Compare similar photos of the time where sitters stood stiff and still, looking out at the viewer and one will see why the Levitsky studio was different from its competitors, and why being an artist was important to the early development of photography.

== Legacy ==
The magnitude of Levitsky's catalogue raisonné remains unknown. His influence on artists, his history, and his life's artistic achievements were erased during the Soviet era; an era where aristocratic origins and ties to the Romanov family were cause for violent repression. The State Russian Museum does not own pictures, drawings or archival documents in its collection of this once great Russian artist.

In the most complete collection ever produced reviewing the tradition of Russian and European painting entitled the Encyclopedia of World Art published by White City; the author Alexander Shestimirov includes Levitsky's artistic work in all three volumes – Russian Seascape Painting – p. 443; Russian Landscape Painting – p. 888; and Russian Portrait Painting – p. 1416.

Individual works are found hanging in the Nekrasov Apartment Museum, 36 Liteiny Avenue, St. Petersburg; The Stavropol Regional Museum of Fine Arts; The Chuvash State Art Museum and The State Tretyakov Gallery, Moscow.

The largest collection of Levitsky works are found in The Di Rocco Wieler Private Collection (DRWC), Toronto, Canada which is dedicated to preserving the memory, legacy and works of Levitsky and Sergei Lvovich Levitsky.

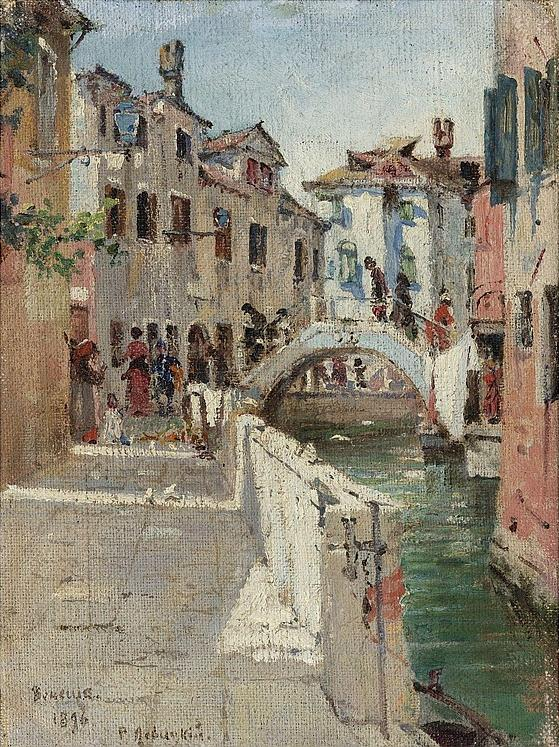
Morning Impression along a Canal in Venice, Veneto, Italy. by Rafail Sergeevich Levitsky.(1896) The Di Rocco Wieler Private Collection, Toronto, Canada

== Selected works ==
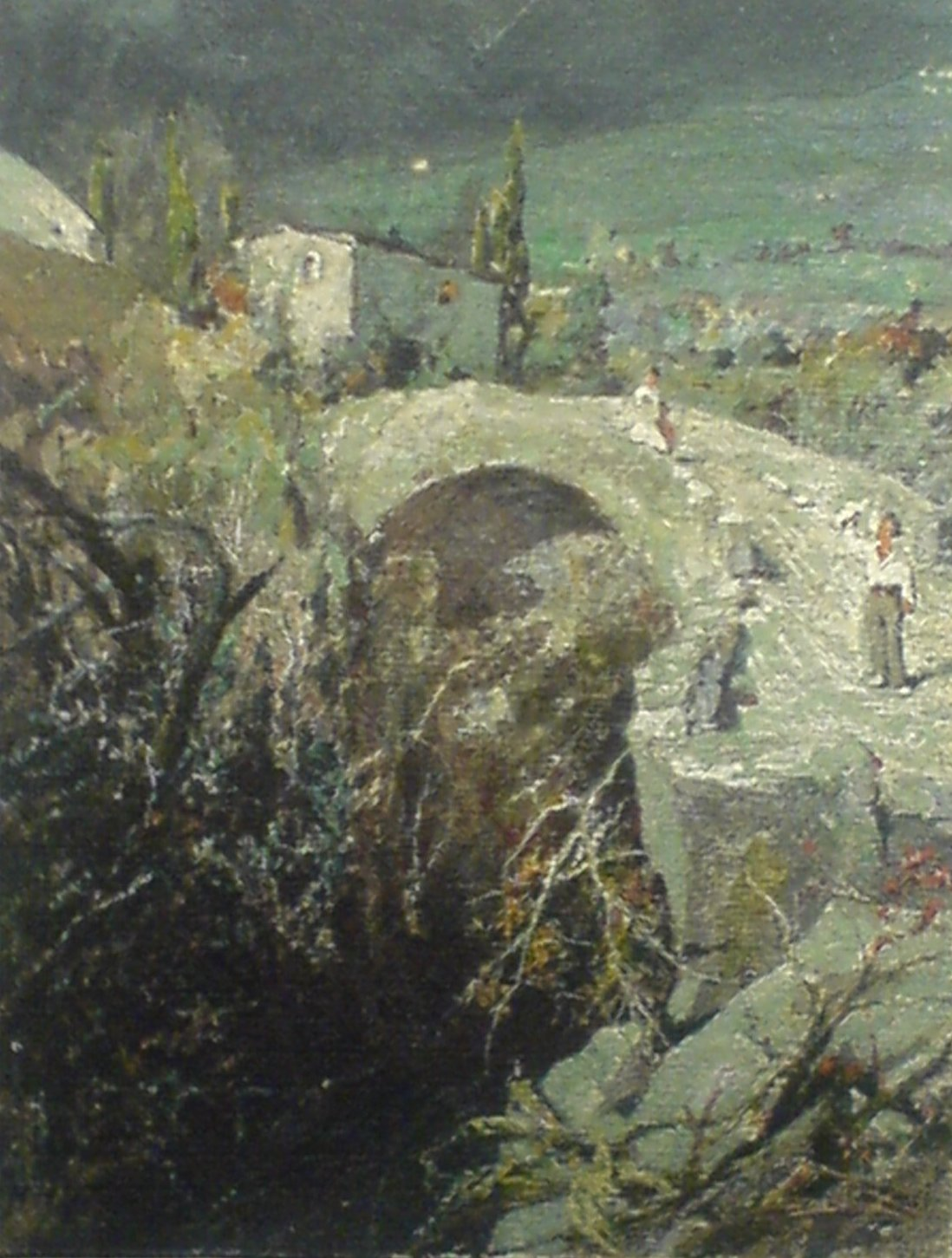
Evening Impression in Rapallo, Genova, Liguria, Italy. by Rafail Sergeevich Levitsky.(1885) The Di Rocco Wieler Private Collection, Toronto, Canada

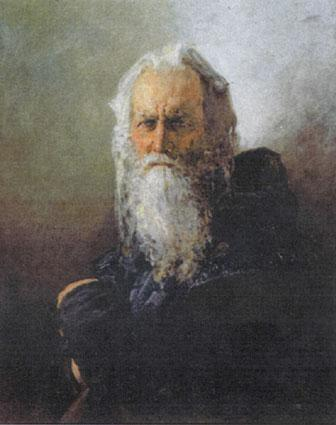
Grandfather Vlas. by Rafail Sergeevich Levitsky. (1895) The Chuvash State Art Museum, Chuvashia Republic

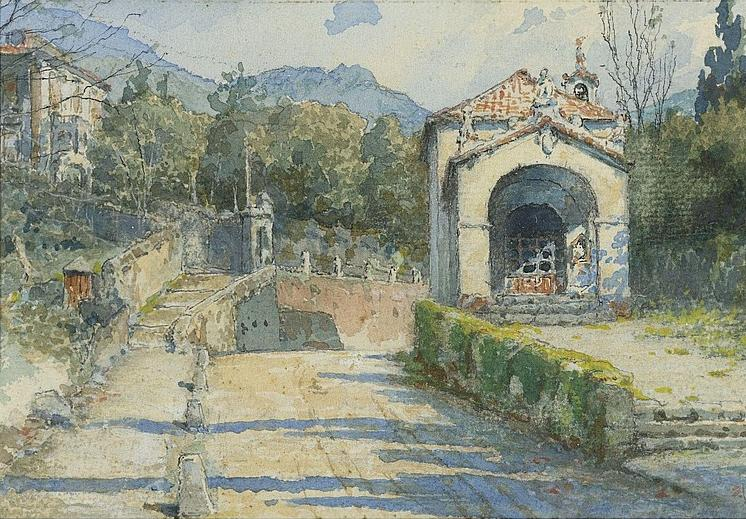
Villa and Gatehouse Trieste, Friuli-Venezia Giulia, Italy. by Rafail Sergeevich Levitsky.(1907) The Di Rocco Wieler Private Collection, Toronto, Canada

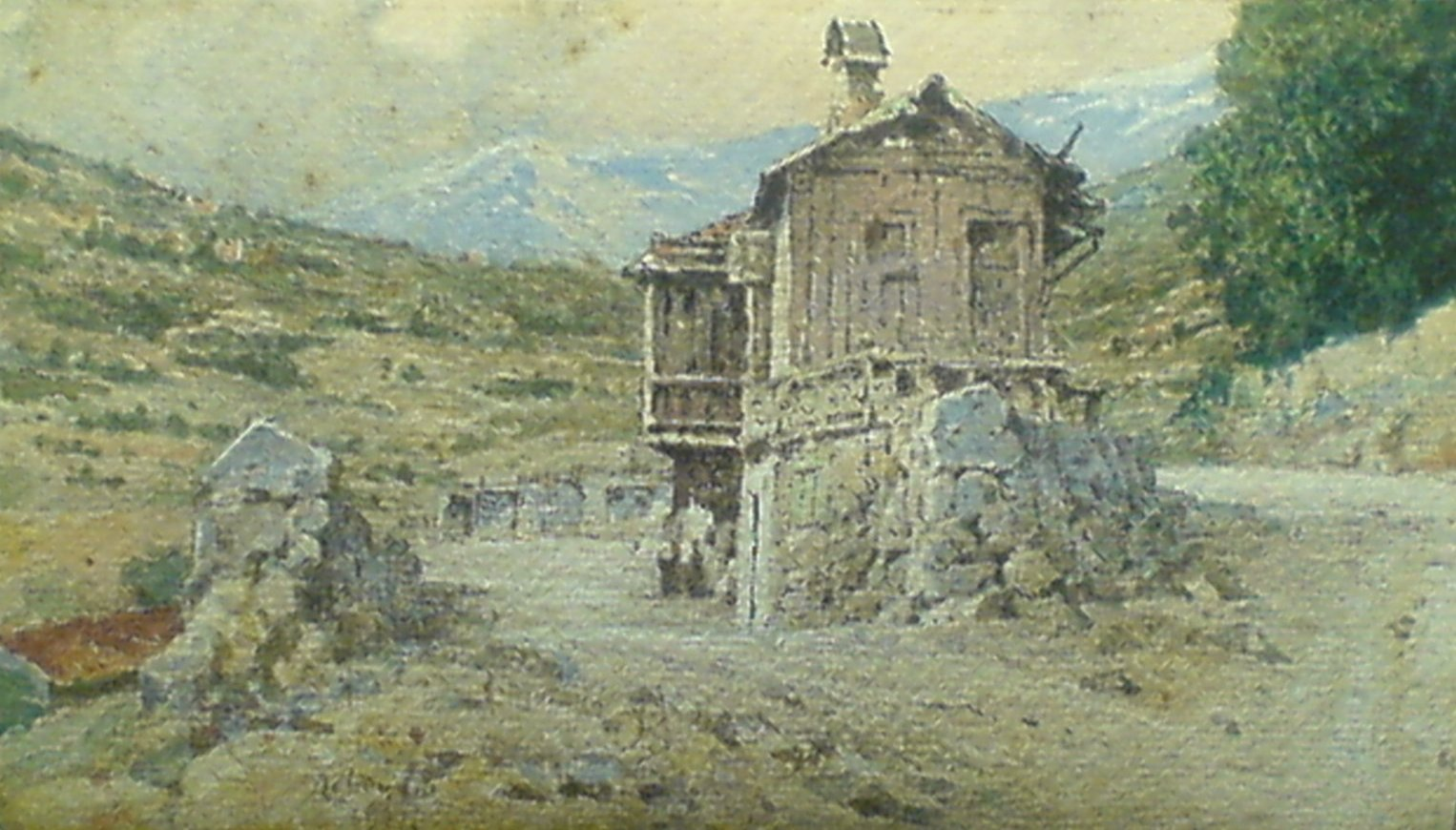
Gatehouse Trieste, Friuli-Venezia Giulia, Italy. by Rafail Sergeevich Levitsky.(1907) The Di Rocco Wieler Private Collection, Toronto, Canada

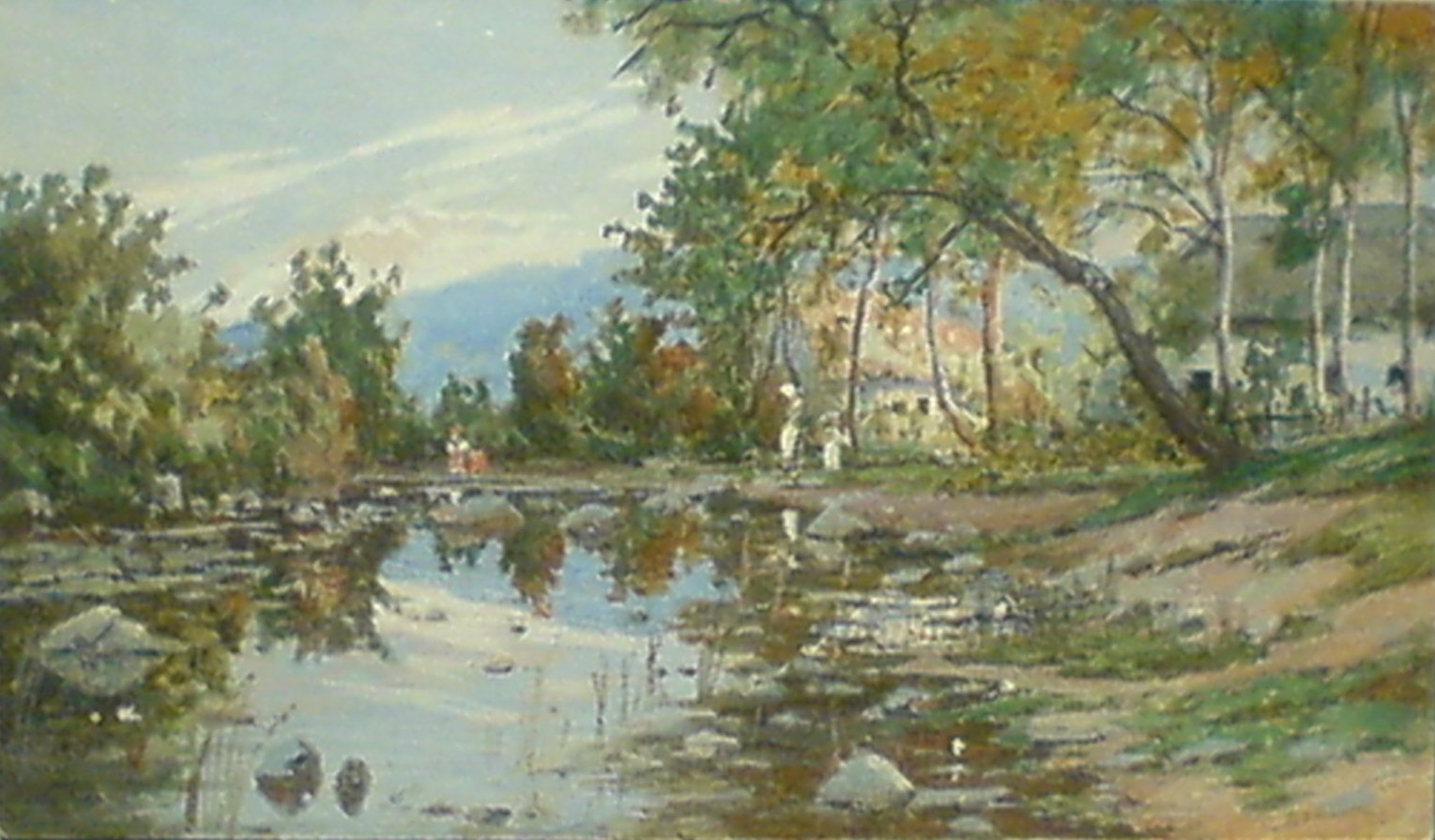
Afternoon Impression Along a Russian Stream. by Rafail Sergeevich Levitsky.(1908) The Di Rocco Wieler Private Collection, Toronto, Canada

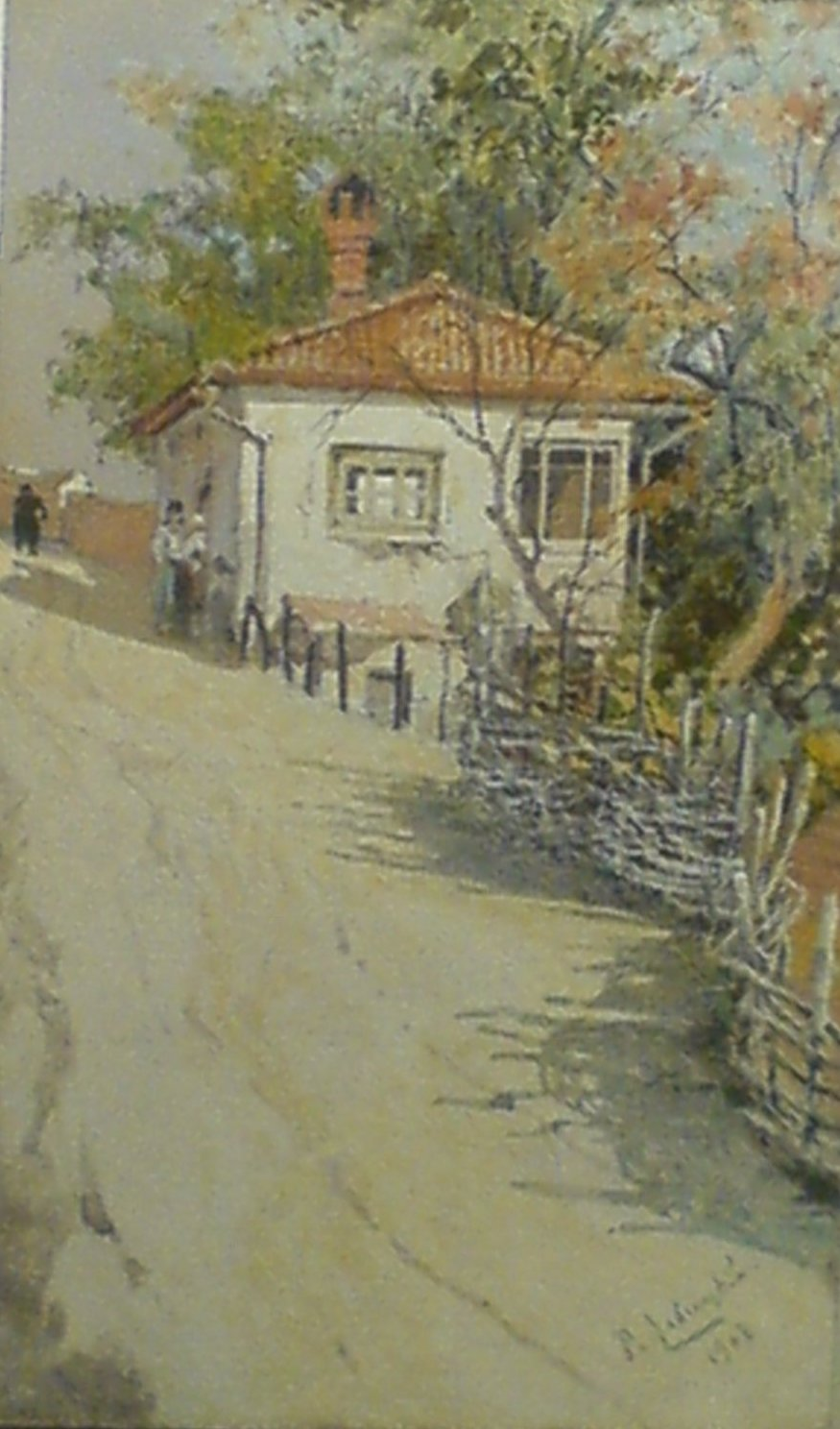
Russian House Afternoon. by Rafail Sergeevich Levitsky.(1908) The Di Rocco Wieler Private Collection, Toronto, Canada

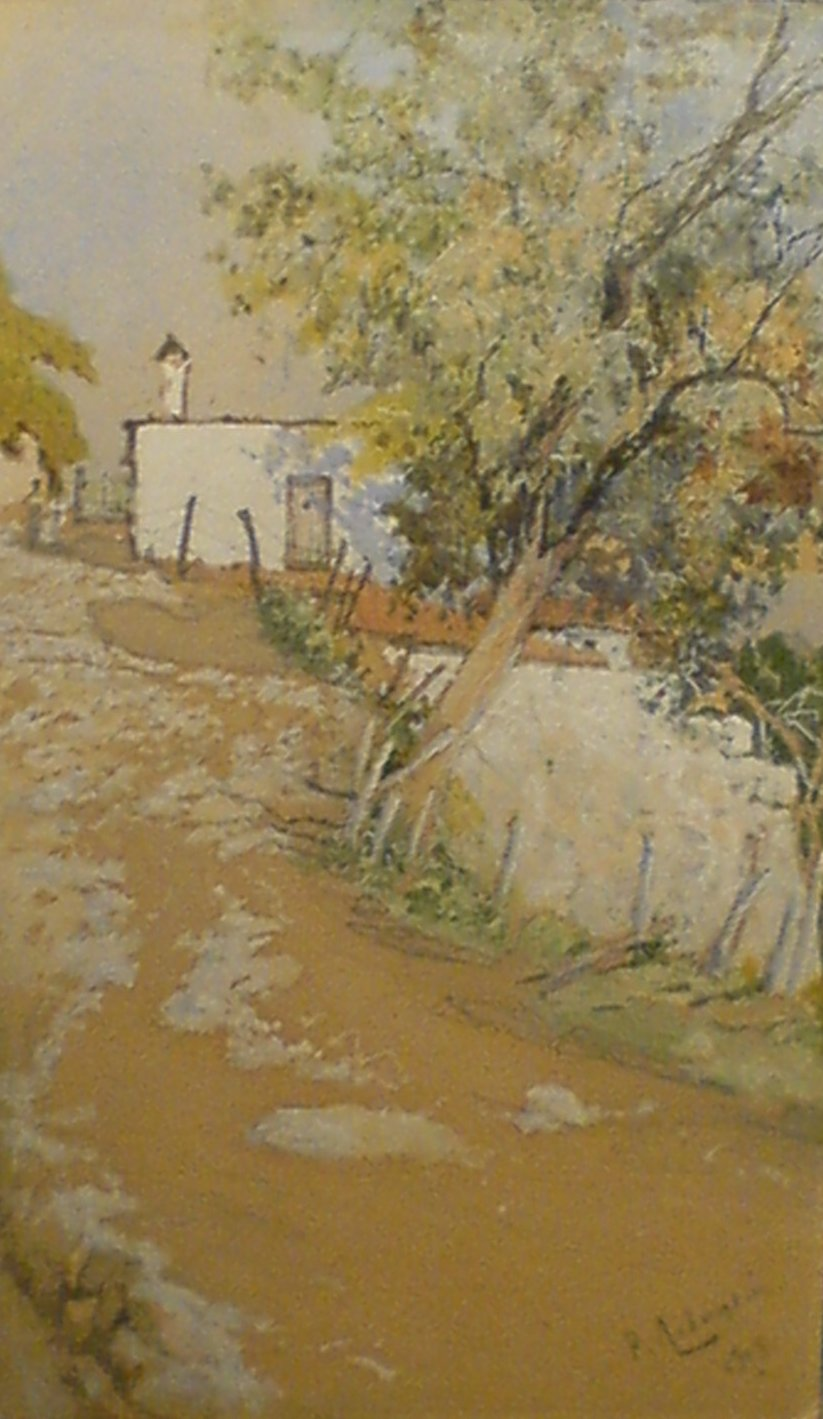
Hillside Walk Russia. by Rafail Sergeevich Levitsky.(1908) The Di Rocco Wieler Private Collection, Toronto, Canada

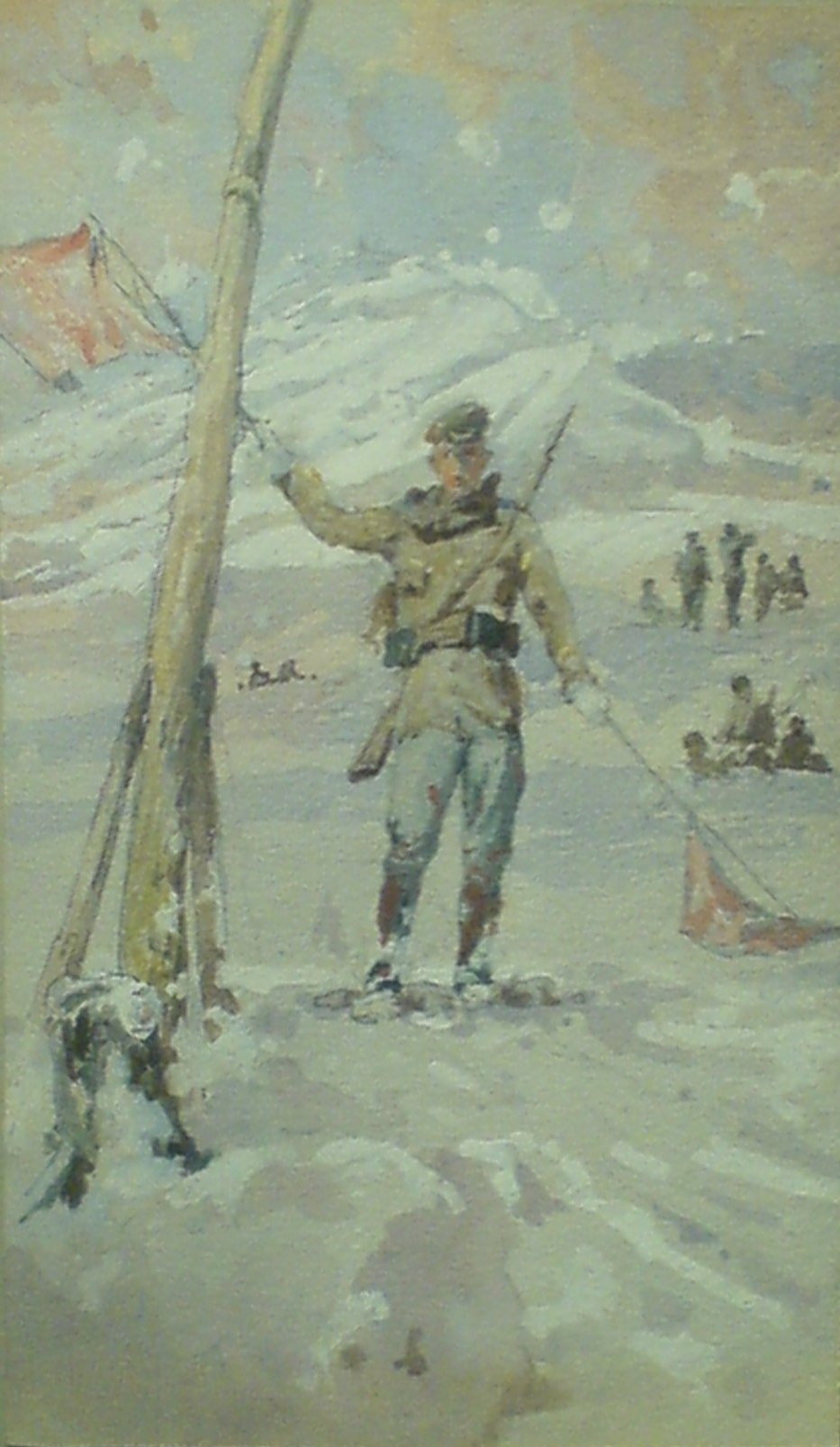
Russian Silesian Offensive. by Rafail Sergeevich Levitsky.(1914) The Di Rocco Wieler Private Collection, Toronto, Canada

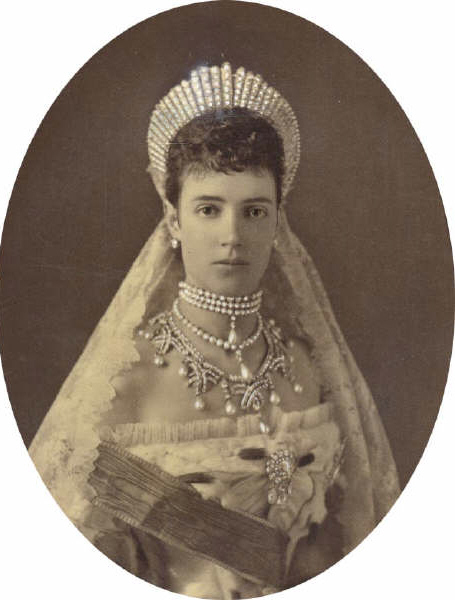
Maria Feodorovna Princess Dagmar of Denmark. by Sergei Lvovich Levitsky and Rafail Sergeevich Levitsky.(1881) The Di Rocco Wieler Private Collection, Toronto, Canada

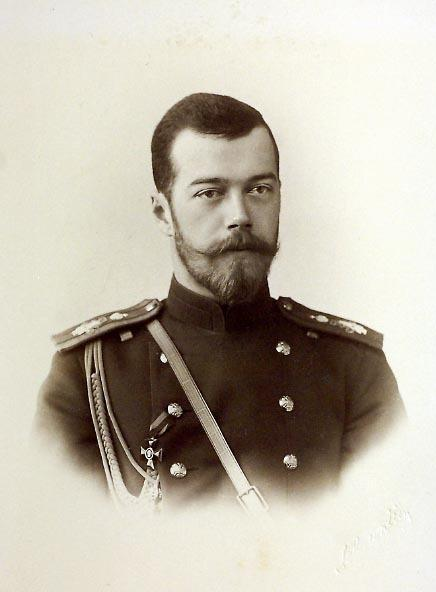
Nicholas II. by Sergei Lvovich Levitsky and Rafail Sergeevich Levitsky.(1894) The Di Rocco Wieler Private Collection, Toronto, Canada

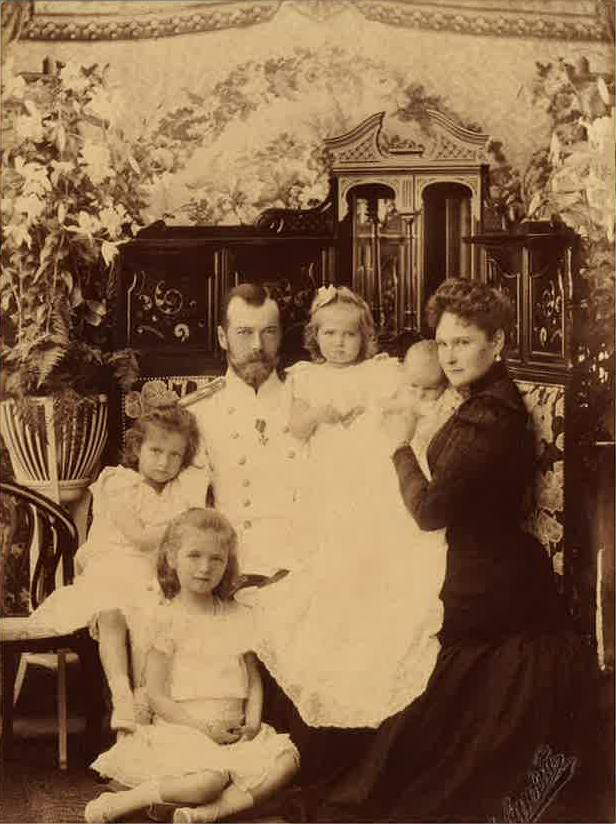
Czar Nicholas II and family by Rafail Sergeevich Levitsky. (August 16, 1901, Peterhof ) The Di Rocco Wieler Private Collection, Toronto, Canada
