= Levitin =

Russian surname

Levitin (masculine) or Levitina (feminine) is a Russian Jewish surname (Леви́тин). It may refer to:

- Daniel Levitin (born 1957), American-Canadian cognitive psychologist, musician and writer
- Igor Levitin (born 1952), Russian politician
- Irina Levitina (born 1954), Russian-American chess player
- Lloyd Levitin (born 1932), American businessman
- Sarah Lewitinn (born 1980), American music executive and DJ
- Sonia Levitin (born 1934), German-American novelist
- Yuri Levitin (1912–1993), Russian composer

== See also ==
- Levi (surname) – family name
