= Olga Lewicka =

Olga Lewicka (born 1975) is a visual artist. Polish born, she lives and works in Berlin. Her practice focuses on painting, but it also encompasses installation, collage, performance, text and artist book.

== Biography ==
Olga Lewicka studied at the Art Academy in Wrocław. In 2005 she won the Eugeniusz-Geppert-Competition and was awarded the price for young Polish painting. In 2007 she was nominated for Views – The Deutsche Bank Foundation Award for the most interesting young artists on the Polish art scene. In 2010 she was awarded the “Młoda Polska” Polish Ministry of Culture and National Heritage scholarship for young artists.

Between 1997 and 2002 she also studied philosophy and literature at Wrocław University, New York University and Europa-Universität Viadrina. In 2003 she completed a doctoral thesis on aporia in art discourses, which was published by Wilhelm Fink Verlag in 2004, under the title “Pollock. Verflechtung des Sichtbaren und des Lesbaren” (Engl. “Pollock. The Intertwining of the Visible and the Readable”).

In her work Olga Lewicka deals with the status of the image and the art work in contemporary society. In research and project based works she mostly deals with painting, examining its possibilities and understanding it as a political argument rather than representation or illustration.

In examining painting, with all its options and reservations caused by its long history, she interrogates and plays off the forces of differences and shifts, to eventually initiate emancipatory visual processes.

== Selected exhibitions ==
=== Solo ===
- 2012 The New Summits. Mapping a Prospective All-Embracing Structure #1 at Wroclaw Contemporary Museum
- 2012 Mapping a Prospective All-Embracing Structure #2 at Verein zur Förderung für Kunst und Kultur am Rosa-Luxemburg-Platz, Berlin
- 2011 Panorama at Galeria Entropia, Wroclaw
- 2009 There ain't no second chance against the thing with forty eyes at lokal_30, Warsaw
- 2005 Showdown at Center for Contemporary Art Ujazdowski Castle, Warsaw

=== Group ===
- 2012 The Happy Fainting of Painting at Zwinger Galerie, Berlin, curated by Gunter Reski and Hans-Jürgen Hafner
- 2011 Love for the Real Thing at Arsenal Municipal Gallery, Poznan, curated by Anna Czaban
- 2010 Diagram – to Jerzy Ludwiński at Galeria Działań, Warsaw, curated by Grzegorz Borkowski and Fredo Ojda
- 2009 How Does Painting Shape New Spaces at Inspiracje Art Festival, Szczecin
- 2008 104. Common Words at Sparwasser HQ, Berlin
- 2007 Views 2007 – The Deutsche Bank Foundation Award, Zachęta National Gallery of Art, Warsaw
- 2004 gegenwärtig: Selbst, inszeniert, Hamburger Kunsthalle, Hamburg, curated by Matthias Mühling

== Selected publications and lectures ==
- 2011 PANORAMA. Materials for Mapping a Prospective All-Embracing Structure. Artist book. Poznań: Morava Publishing House
- 2010 Wie Polens Königsweg nun zum Irrweg wird. from 24 April 2010 and Der Standard from 22 April
- 2007 Samson, or Contemporary Art. Obieg, Centre for Contemporary Art Ujazdowski Castle, no 1&2/2007
- 2007 AURORA. Zwischen Nacht und Tag. Ein Ausstellungs- und Buchprojekt zwischen Berlin und Wrocław in zwei Teilen. Artist book. Wrocław: BWA Awangarda
- 2007 Aurora. Utopie und Surréflexion. In: S. Diekmann/T. Khurana, Latenz. Berlin: Kulturverlag Kadmos
- 2006 An den Grenzen der Repräsentation. In: V. Beyer/A. Haverkamp/J. Voorhoeve, Das Bild ist der König. Repräsentation nach Louis Marin. München: Wilhelm Fink
- 2005 Drip´n´Draw - Entwurf und Konzept bei Jackson Pollock. Lecture at Deutsche Guggenheim Berlin
- 2005 Pollock. Verflechtung des Sichtbaren und des Lesbaren. München: Wilhelm Fink
