= Sergey Lvovich Levitsky =

Russian photographer and inventor (1819–1898)

Sergei Levitsky
- Сергей Левицкий
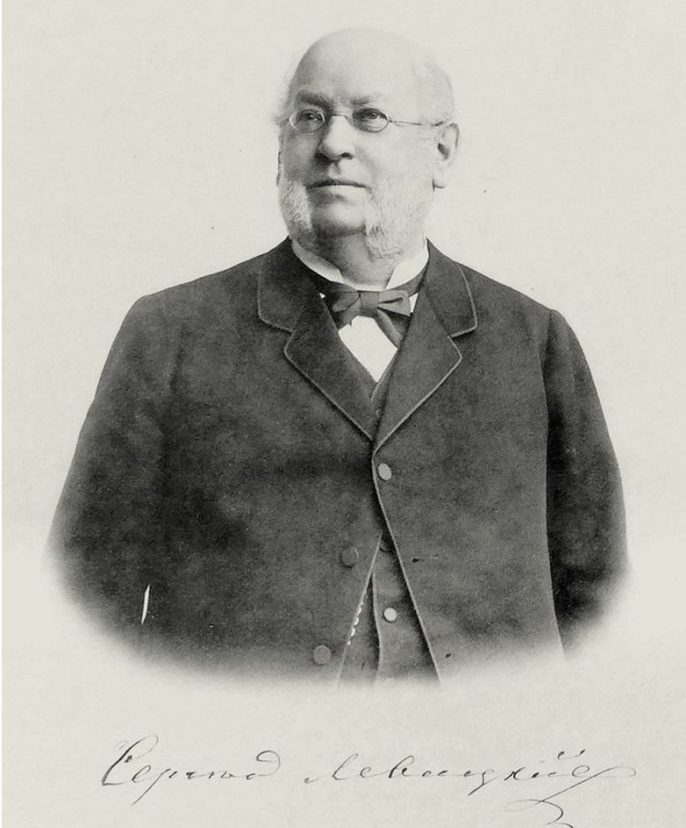
- Levitsky in 1890
- Born: Sergei Lvov-Lvitsky; 17 August 1819; Moscow, Russia
- Died: 22 June 1898 (aged 78); St. Petersburg, Russia
- Resting place: Smolensky Cemetery, St. Petersburg
- Education: Imperial Moscow University
- Known for: Portrait photography
- Awards: 1849, Paris Exposition of the Second Republic received first ever gold medal for landscape photography; in 1851, received first ever gold medal awarded for portrait photography
- Patrons: Alexander II of Russia; Alexander III of Russia; Nicholas II of Russia; Napoleon III

Sergei Lvovich Levitsky (Russian: Сергей Львович Левицкий; 17 August [O.S. 5 August] 1819 – 22 June [O.S. 10 June] 1898) was a Russian photographer, best known for his portraits. He is considered to be one of the patriarchs of Russian photography and one of Europe's most important early photographic pioneers, inventors, and innovators.

== Early life ==
Of noble birth, he was a cousin of Aleksandr Ivanovich Herzen (1812–1870), the writer and outstanding public figure; husband to Anna Antonovna and father to Rafail Sergeevich Levitsky (1847–1940), a Peredvizhniki artist who was court photographer to the ill-fated family of Czar Nicholas II, the last emperor of Russia.

Sergei was born Lvov-Lvitsky in Moscow but later changed his name to Levitsky. At his parents request he attended and graduated (1839) from the Faculty of Law, Lomonosov Moscow State University and soon after served in the Russian civil service with the Ministry of the Interior, St. Petersburg. His ability to speak several languages allowed him to participate in a government commission to study the composition and therapeutic properties of mineral waters in the Caucasus.

On his mission there in 1843, accompanied by the chemist and botanist Carl Julius Fritzsche, an associate of the chemistry department at the Emperor's Academy of Sciences. Levitsky made several daguerreotype views using his camera and the French-made Chevalier lens, which Fritzsche had brought with him from Paris.

Daguerreotype, the first form of photography, was invented by Louis Daguerre in 1839. One problem was that it required exposure times as long as thirty minutes to create a portrait.

Levitsky's use of the 1840 Charles Chevalier-designed lens, known as the "Photographe à Verres Combinés" as it combined two cemented achromats; reduced the time needed to capture an image as it improved the camera's focusing ability. The lens brought speeds down to about f/5.6 for portrait work, and, as a bonus, the lens could be converted for use as a landscape lens.

== Paris studio ==
In 1845 Levitsky travelled to Rome and Venice in Italy before undertaking a course in physics and chemistry at the Sorbonne in Paris but is not listed as working as a professional photographer. He had returned to Russia by 1849 when he opened a studio in St Petersburg.

It was in Paris in the 1840s that Sergei Levitsky studied photography and the technical sphere of photographic development. Daguerre had heard about the Russian photographer and later received him.

In 1847 Levitsky designed a bellows camera which significantly improved focusing. This adaptation influenced the design of cameras for decades and is still in use today in some professional cameras.

While in Paris, he would become the first to introduce interchangeable decorative backgrounds in his photos, as well as the retouching of negatives to reduce or eliminate technical deficiencies.

Levitsky was the first photographer to portray individuals in different poses and even in different clothes; e.g., the subject might appear to play the piano and stand aside to listen to himself.

In 1849 his images of the Caucasus, Pyatigorsk (large Daguerreotype landscape views made on plates 30x40cm and 24x30cm in size) captured by Levitsky, were exhibited by the famous Parisian optician Charles Chevalier at the Paris Exposition of the Second Republic, also known as the Exposition Nationale des produits de l’industrie agricole et manufacturière, as an advertisement of their lenses. These photos would receive the Exposition's gold medal; the first time a prize of its kind had ever been awarded to a photograph.

Between 1859 and 1864, Levitsky operated a studio at 22 rue de Choiseul in Paris, formerly the address of American daguerreotypist Warren Thompson [aka Warren-Thompson] and joined the Société Française de Photographie (SPF).

Levitsky and Warren-Thompson were associated 1847-49 both making large format daguerreotypes. Thompson opened a studio at 22 rue Choiseul in 1853.

Following his father's lead, Rafail Levitsky worked alongside his father in Paris placing his Russian monogram Russian: Р Л; on the carte de visite (CDV) photo cards when his hand was involved in the process of taking the photograph.

In 1864 when his father closed the Levitsky studio in Paris, Rafail returned to Russia with his father.

Levitsky sold his studio to Augustin Aimé Joseph Le Jeune, whose cards carried the Levitsky name and noted that he was the new owner/successor i.e. 'Lejeune succ^{r}' until at least 1867. Lejeune reused negatives made by Levitsky as well as making his own images.

Lejeune also operated a studio at 106 Rue de Rivoli with a relative, Denis Victor Adolphe Le Jeune, from 1867.

Confusion as to Levitsky's studio in Paris has arisen from the reference to 'Levitsky', 'M. Levitsky' and 'Maison Levitsky' on Lejeune's cartes de visites and cabinet cards with his ownership and authorship printed usually on the lower right hand side, as 'Le Jeune Succ^{r}'.

By 1872 Le Jeune was operating at 350 Rue St Honore after the Le Jeunes sold the Rue de Rivoli studio to Auguste La Planquais in 1873, and the next year the Rue St Honore studio to Léon Abraham Marius Joliot.

Le Jeune was listed as a member of the SPF until 1885, as was Levitsky, but the latter is most likely a confusion with the exit date of Lejeune.

In 1864 Levitsky wrote about his Paris career in The Russian Magazine "Photograph" (1864, No. 3-4) in which he described his great success and artistic triumph which "brought to his Paris studio daily orders of some 1500 requests; many of which could not be filled".

Showing how skillful combination of natural and artificial light can create interesting effects, Levitsky's photographs became recognized throughout Europe.

== Art imitating life ==
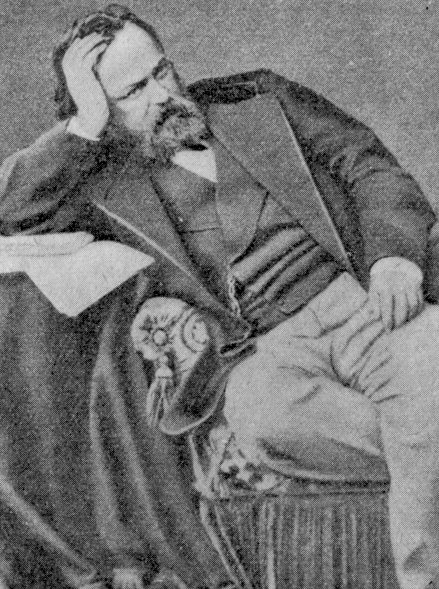
Alexander Herzen, by Sergei Lvovich Levitsky,1860 (Private Collection of Alexei Loginov)

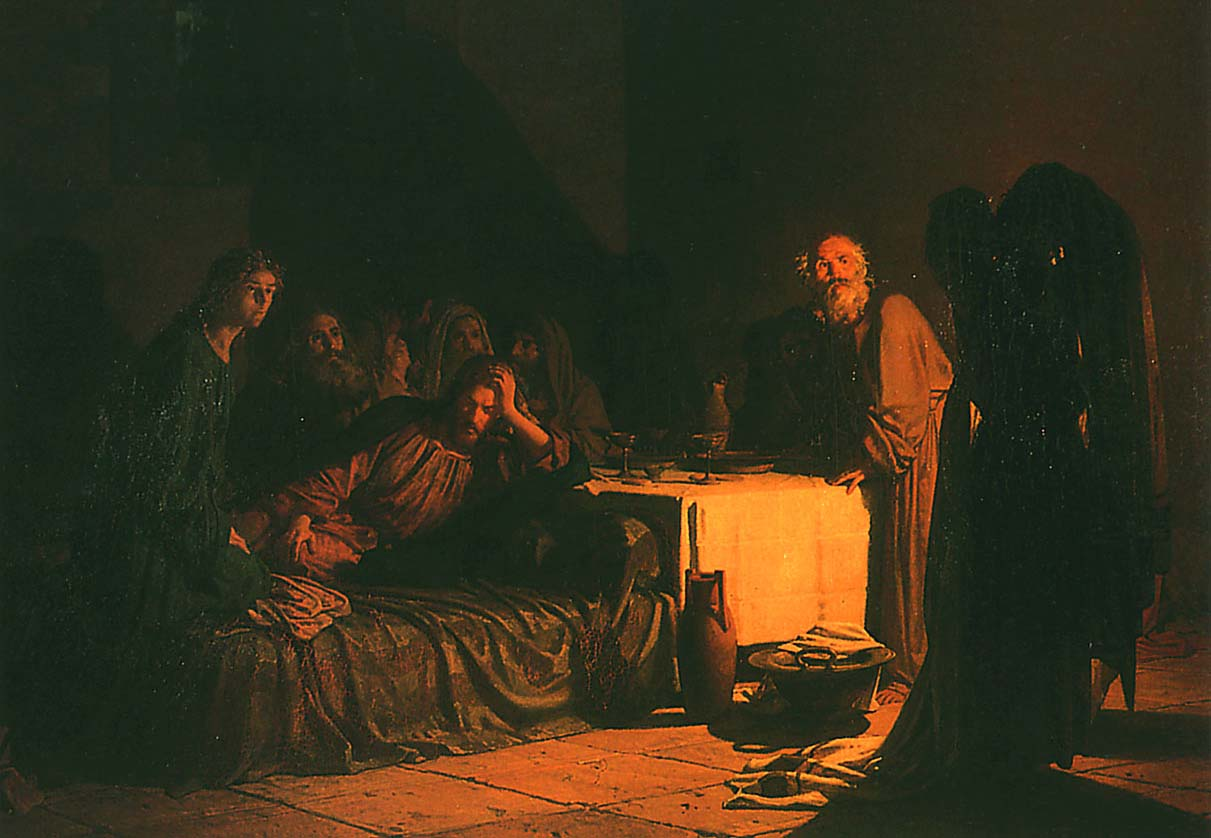
The Last Supper, by Nikolai Ge,1863

During this time Levitsky was thought to be the first photographer to create true psychological photo-portraits.

It is in Paris, that Levitsky would make a series of portraits of his cousin Alexander Herzen; most notable was his portrait of Herzen leaning in a chair which did not simply capture Herzen in his natural state and attitude but conveyed the essence of him as a thoughtful writer, full of mental fatigue, bitterness and disappointment.

Creating images that captured the sentiment of each sitter was in keeping with beliefs found in Russian art of the mid nineteenth century, such as literature, music and theatre where artists believed it was possible to penetrate into the soul of a person.

This image of Herzen was so strong that Peredvizhniki artist Nikolai Ge would use the repose of Herzen for his Christ figure in his painting The Last Supper (1863).

The artist Ge would recall, "I wanted to go to London to paint Herzen's portrait,... and he responded to my request with a large portrait by Mr. Levitsky".

The final painting's similarity between the Levitsky photo of Herzen and Christ led the press of the day to exclaim the painting as "a triumph of materialism and nihilism".

It is the first time photography became the main starting point for the solution to a central character of a painting and speaks to the deep influences that photography would have later on in art and movements like French Impressionism.

In 1851, at an exhibition in Paris, Levitsky would win the first ever gold medal awarded for a portrait photograph.

In Paris, the Levitsky studio took photos of legendary personalities that included U.S. President Millard Fillmore (1800–1874) and European Royalty.

The studio was the first foreign studio to be given the title of court photographer to Emperor Napoleon III of France.

== St. Petersburg studio ==
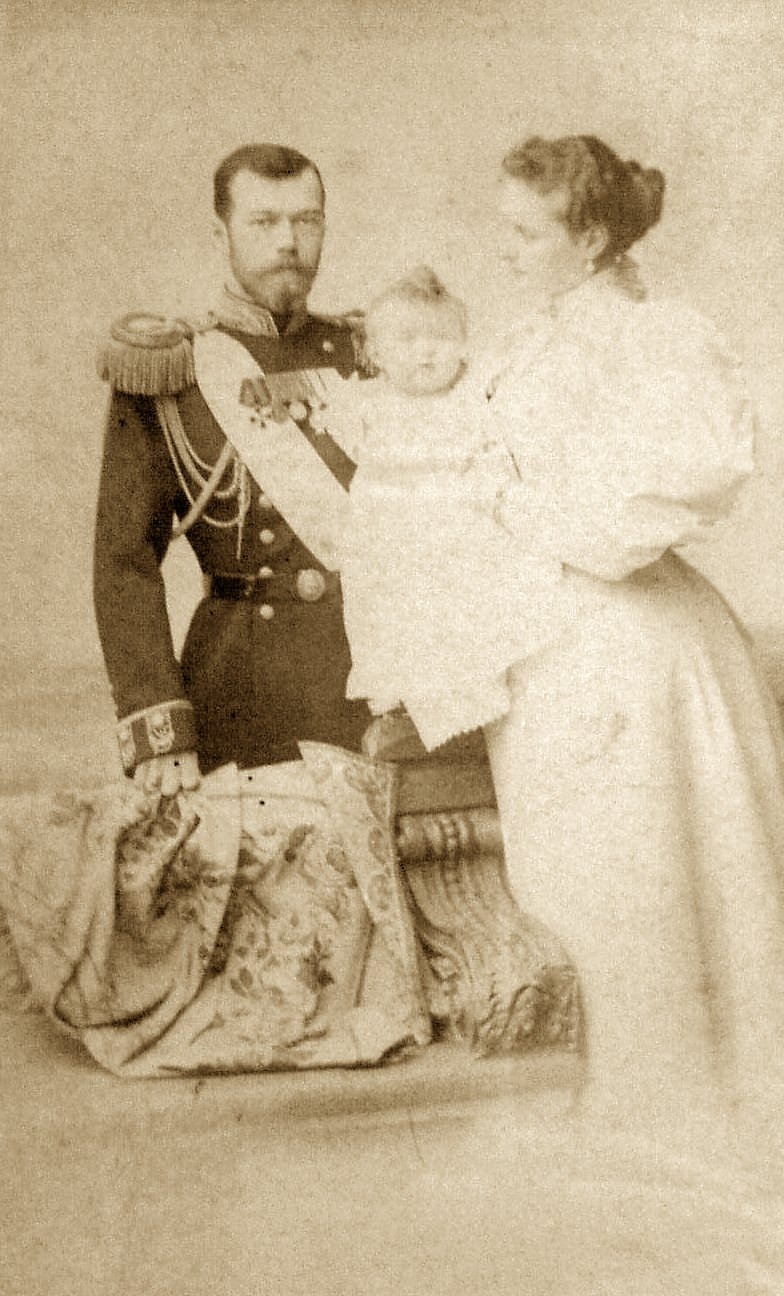
Czar Nicholas II, Empress Alexandra, and daughter Olga. by Sergei Lvovich Levitsky.(1896)

One of the first major photographic studios in Russia was owned and operated by Sergei Levitsky, who on his return from Paris in autumn 1849, opened a daguerreotype photo studio called "Light painting" in St. Petersburg on October 22, 1849.

It is Sergei Levitsky who first proposed the idea to artificially light subjects in a studio setting using electric lighting along with daylight saying of its use, "as far as I know this application of electric light has never been tried; it is something new, which will be accepted by photographers because of its simplicity and practicality".

On a trip to Rome, Sergei photographed a group of prominent Russian painters and writers including Nikolai Gogol, displaying his learned technical advancements. Levitsky's portrait of Gogol is now believed to be the only known portrait of this great personality.

These photos were major successes for Levitsky and word spread quickly about a studio that had its employees traveling to the homes of customers with their daguerreotype apparatus.

Considered the best of Russia's portrait photographers, the Levitsky studio photographed four generations of the Romanov dynasty. In 1877 it was awarded the title Photographer of their Royal Majesty.

Levitsky is perhaps best known for a series of photographs of famous artists, writers and public figures (included among these notable figures were Nikolai Nekrasov, Ivan Turgenev, Ivan Goncharov, Vladimir Sollogub, Fedor Tyutchev, Peter Vyazemsky, Alexander Strugovshchikov, Vasily Botkin, Ivan Panaev, Pavel Annenkov, Dmitry Grigorovich, Alexander Herzen, Sergey Volkonsky, and Leo Tolstoy).

By the 1890s, the Levitsky St. Petersburg studio was a father son enterprise, with Rafail Levitsky working alongside his father.

Photo cards of this time have the distinctive Levitsky name 'and Son' Russian: Левицкий и сын both written as a signature and printed on their backs.

In May 1878 Sergei Levitsky was one of the founders of Russia's first Photographic Societies, part of the Imperial Russian Technical Society; which saw him work alongside Dmitri Ivanovich Mendeleev and other scientists experimenting with photography using artificial light.

Sergei Levitsky was also a writer of articles for the Russian magazine "Photograph" and was actively involved in organizing national and international photographic exhibitions throughout his lifetime.

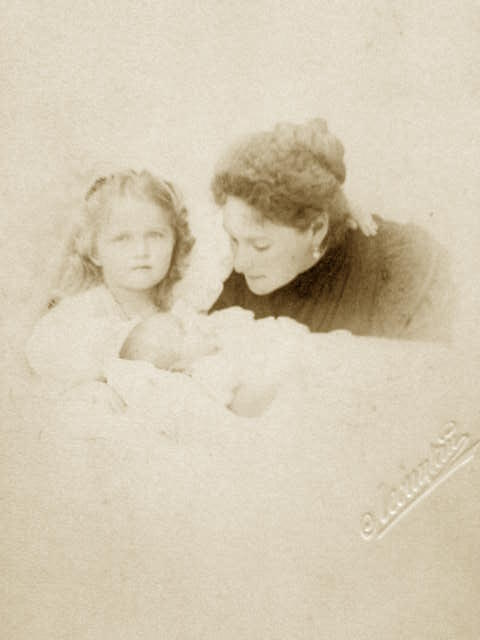
Czarina Alexandra with Olga and Maria. by Rafail Sergeevich Levitsky .(1899) The Di Rocco Wieler Private Collection, Toronto, Canada

He wrote memoirs in two volumes entitled, Reminiscences of an Old Photographer (1892) and How I Became a Photographer (1896).

He is buried in St. Petersburg's Smolenskoye Cemetery.

Upon his father’s death in 1898, Rafail Levitsky continued the operation and tradition of the Levitsky portrait studio taking the now famous photos of Czar Nicholas II and Czarina Alexandra and their children Grand Duchess Olga Nikolaevna of Russia, Grand Duchess Tatiana Nikolaevna of Russia, Grand Duchess Maria Nikolaevna of Russia, Grand Duchess Anastasia Nikolaevna of Russia, and Alexei Nikolaevich, Tsarevich of Russia.

So popular were the photos of the Romanovs that they were reproduced individually for public consumption in an 'Edition A Bon Marche' by Rafail.

While running the St. Petersburg studio, Rafail began the tradition of taking photos of everyday Russian actors and everyday Russian people while continuing the Studio's resume of taking photos of widely known Russians including Grand Duke Michael Alexandrovich of Russia, Russian General Aleksei Nikolaievitch Kouropatkine and Pyotr Ilyich Tchaikovsky.

The Levitsky Studio was located in Moika River Embankment, 30 (1860s), Nevsky Prospect, 28 (1890s), and Kazanskaya Street, 3 (1898, the house is not preserved).

The Levitsky St. Petersburg Studio remained in operation until it was closed by the Soviets in 1918.

== Legacy ==
The magnitude of Sergei and Rafail Levitsky’s catalogue raisonné remains unknown. Their influence on photographers, artists, their history, and their life’s artistic achievements were erased during the Soviet era; an era where aristocratic origins and ties to the Romanov family were cause for violent repression.

During the Soviet era the official government point of view on the development of photography in Russia in the pre-revolutionary period was: "In our country, before the Great October Socialist Revolution there was no photographic industry. Photographic products were found in only a few semi-artisan factories. Although our compatriots were associated with many of the crucial inventions in photography. .., the ruling circles of autocracy hampered the development of domestic photography as cameras, plates, and photographic paper were mainly imported from abroad".

In 1978, the decision to set up a photographic section within the Musée d'Orsay, Paris, France marked the first recognition and inclusion of works by Sergei Lvovich Levitsky. The National Portrait Gallery, London, England followed soon after. The Metropolitan Museum of Art in New York also has a few examples of his work.

In 1992, the vaults of the Russian State Documentary Film and Photo Archive at Krasnogorsk (RGAKFD) were opened to reveal photographic documentation of events from over a century ago to the present in Russia. Many early photos are arranged in large albums according to subject. Among these are 300 personal albums of the Tsars. Although mostly documentary in nature, the Archive does hold work by many famous Russian still photographers which includes those of Sergei Lvovich Levitsky and Rafail Sergeevich Levitsky.

Today, the largest collection of paintings by Rafail Sergeevich Levitsky are found in The Di Rocco Wieler Private Collection (DRWC), Toronto, Canada. The collection, which is dedicated to preserving the memory, legacy and works of both Rafail Sergeevitch Levitsky and Sergei Lvovich Levitsky; has many important early photos by Sergei Lvovich Levitsky.

== Selected works ==
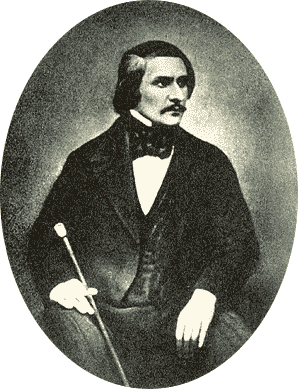
Nikolai Gogol, by Sergei Lvovich Levitsky, 1849

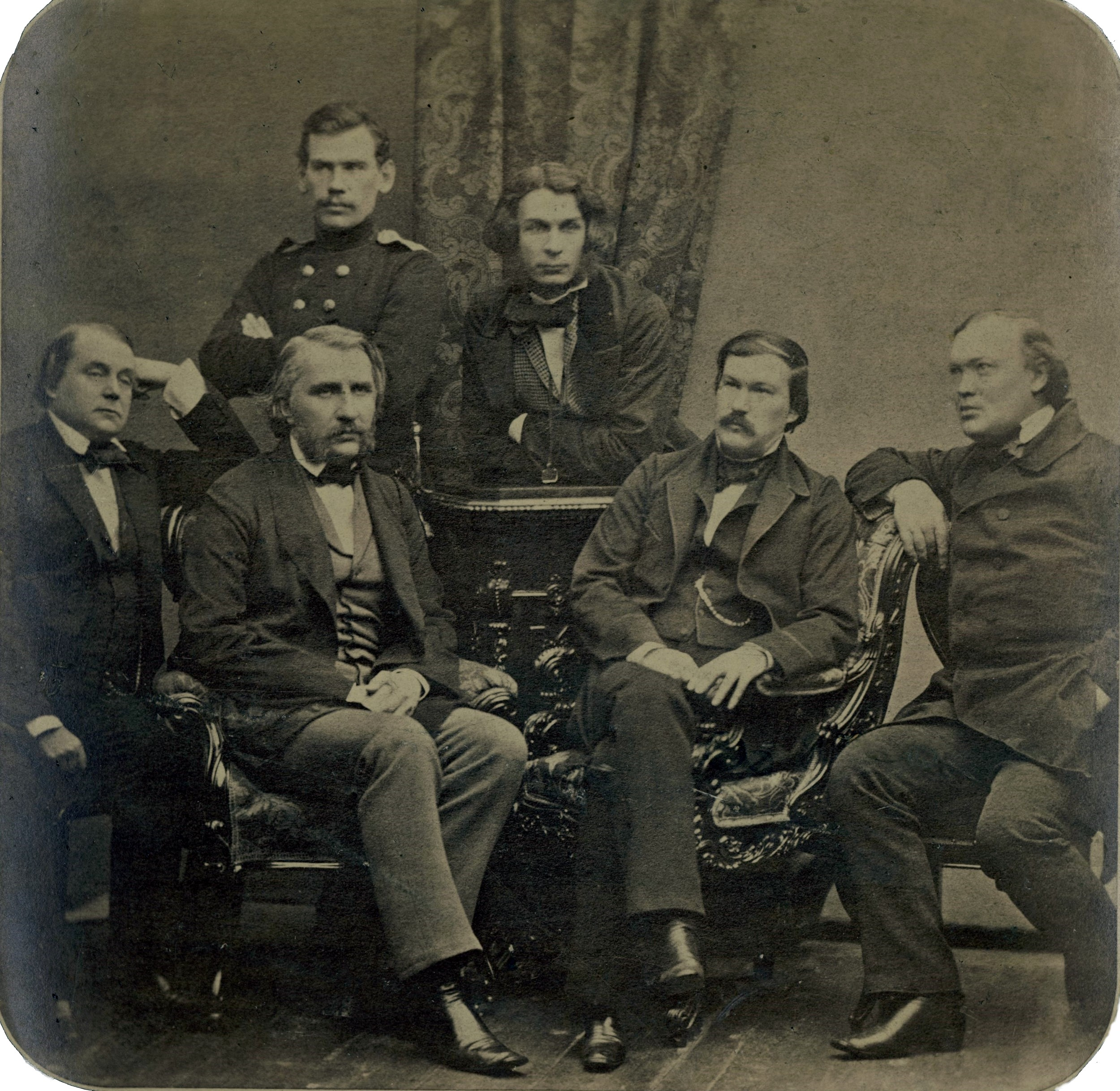
Ivan Goncharov, Ivan Turgenev, Leo Tolstoy, Dimitri Vassilievich Grigorovich, Alexandre Vassilievich Drujinin, and Alexandr Nikolievich Ostrovsky, by Sergei Lvovich Levitsky,1856

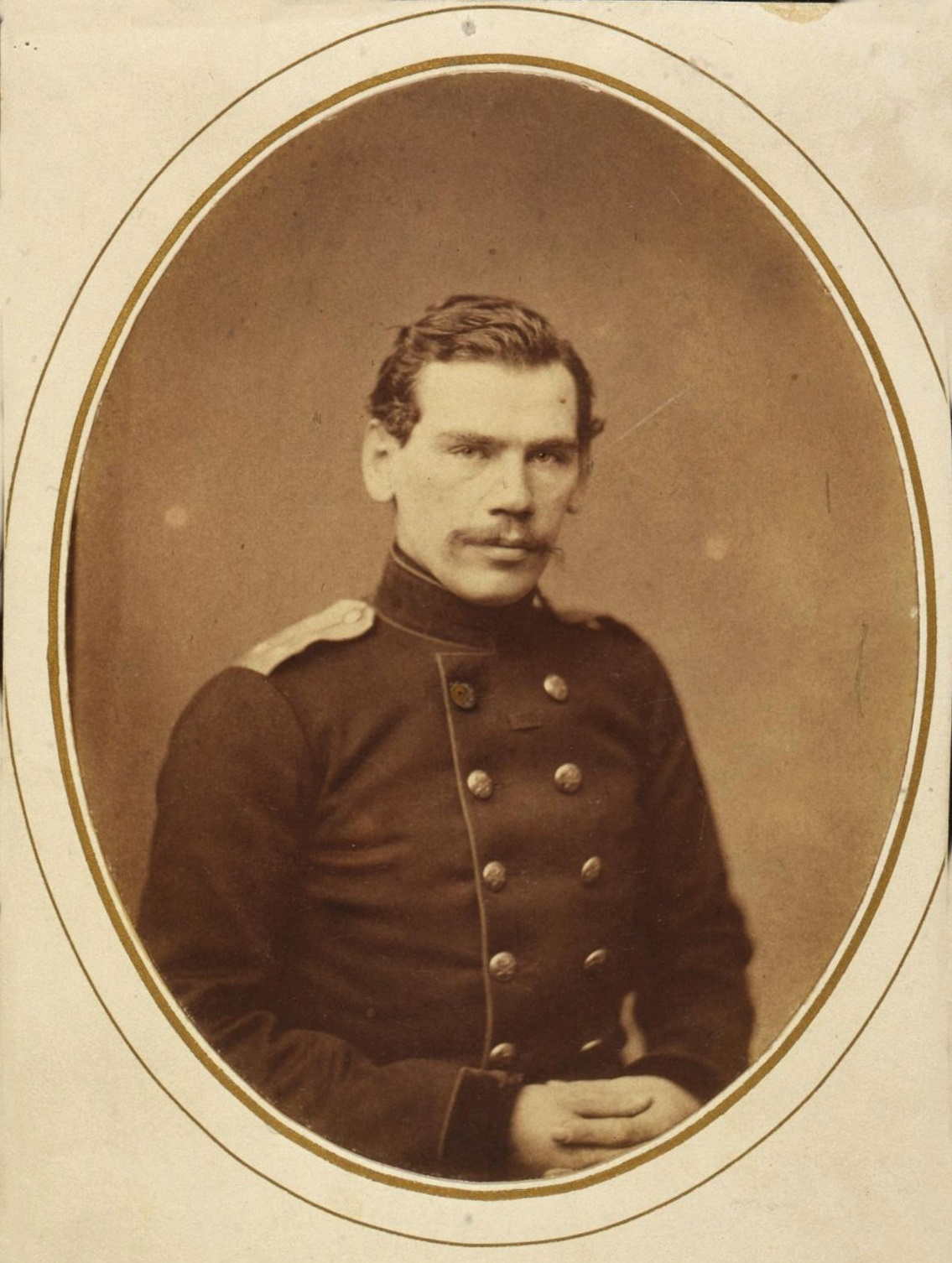
Count Lev Nikolayevich Tolstoy, by Sergei Lvovich Levitsky, 1856

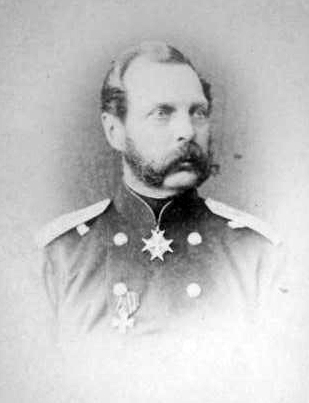
Alexander II, by Sergei Lvovich Levitsky, 1860 (The Di Rocco Wieler Private Collection, Toronto, Canada)

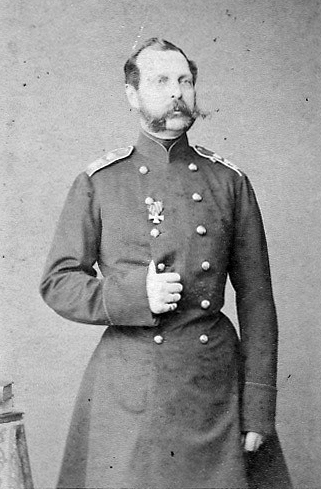
Alexander II, by Sergei Lvovich Levitsky, 1860 (The Di Rocco Wieler Private Collection, Toronto, Canada)

Prince Albert Edward Prince of Wales later King Edward VII, by Sergei Lvovich Levitsky circa 1864 (The Di Rocco Wieler Private Collection, Toronto, Canada)

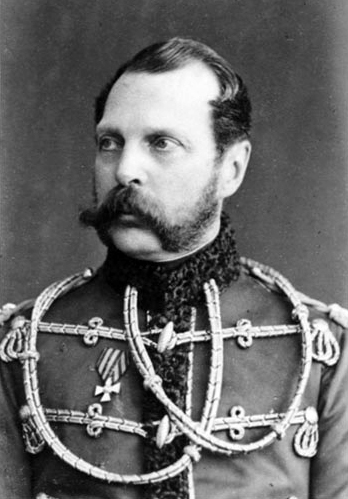
Alexander II by Sergei Lvovich Levitsky 1870 (The Di Rocco Wieler Private Collection, Toronto, Canada)

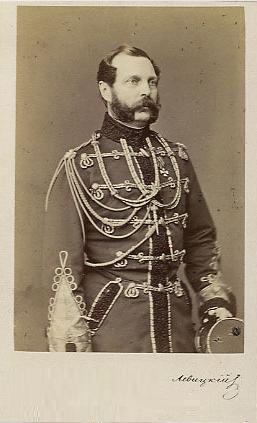
Alexander II by Sergei Lvovich Levitsky 1870 (The Di Rocco Wieler Private Collection, Toronto, Canada)

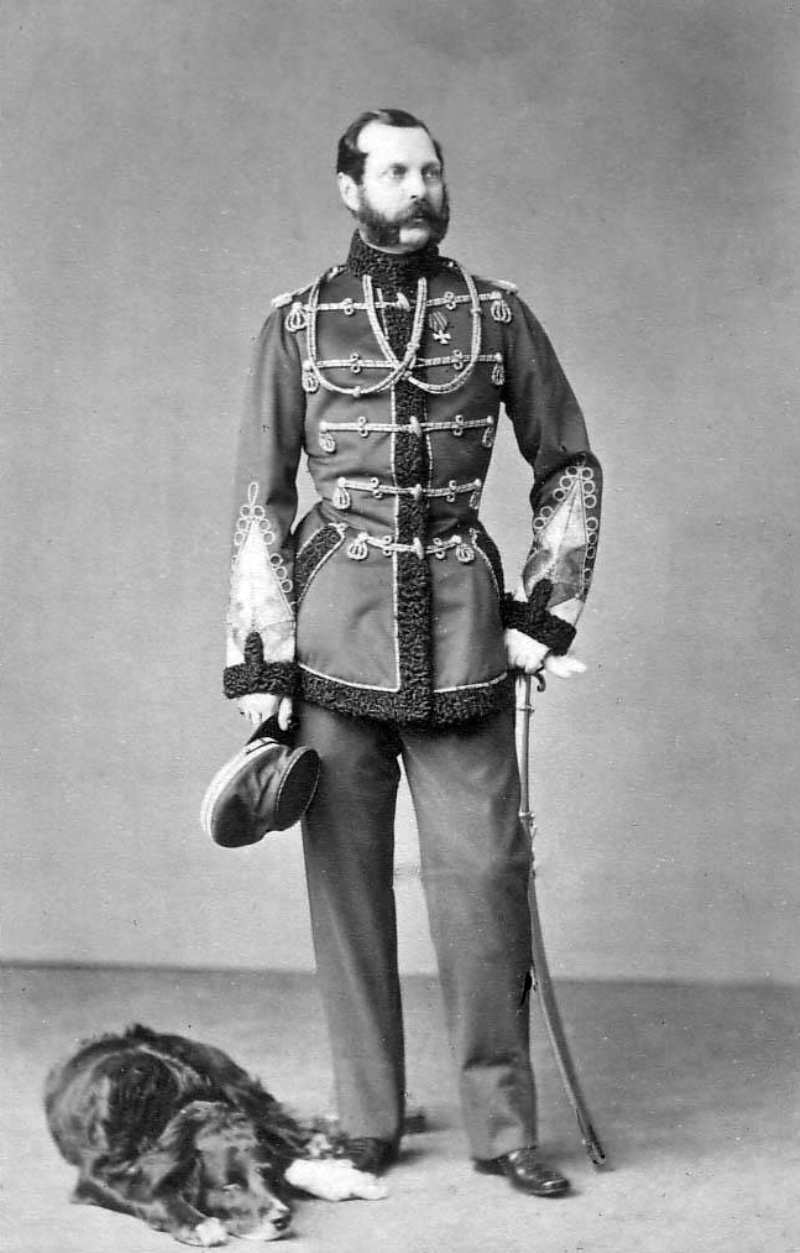
Alexander II and his dog Milord 1870, by Sergei Lvovich Levitsky (The Di Rocco Wieler Private Collection, Toronto, Canada)

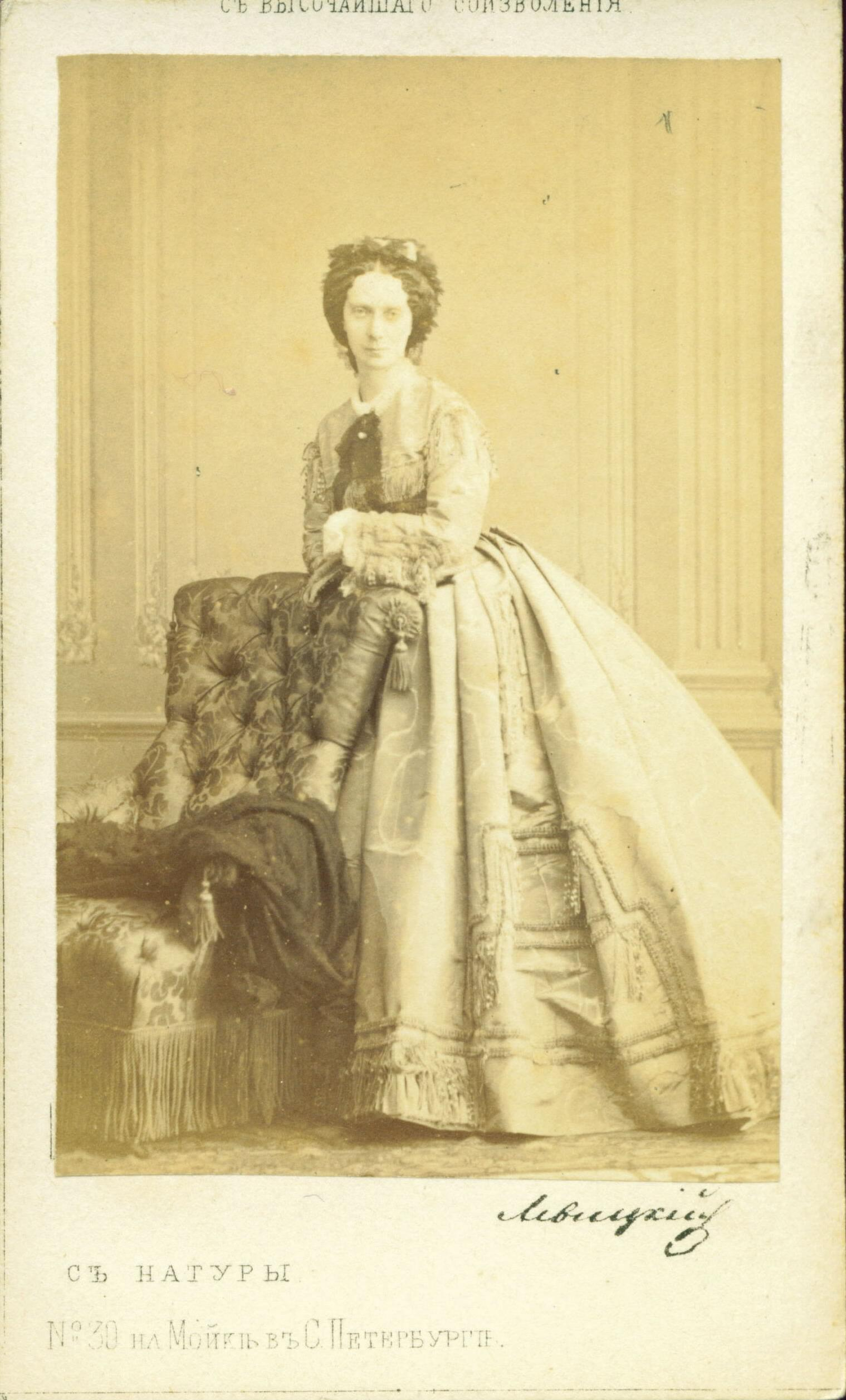
Empress Consort of Alexander II Maria Alexandrovna. by Sergei Lvovich Levitsky, 1855 (The Di Rocco Wieler Private Collection, Toronto, Canada)

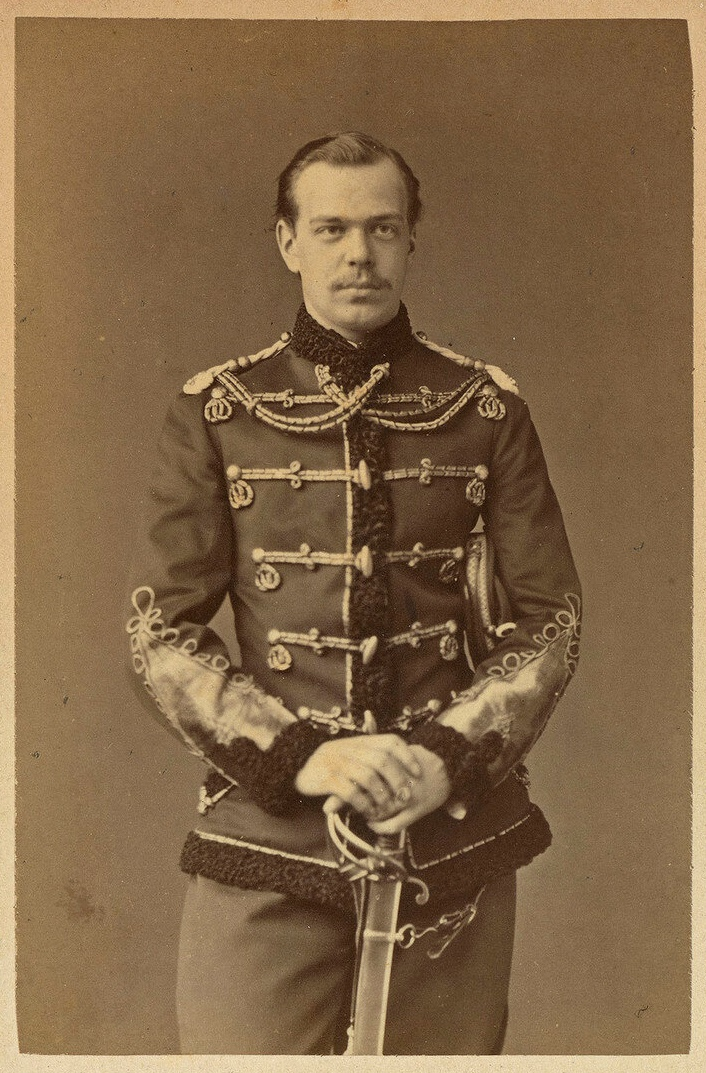
Tsarevitch Alexander later Alexander III, by Sergei Lvovich Levitsky 1865 (The Di Rocco Wieler Private Collection, Toronto, Canada)

Tsarevitch Alexander later Alexander III, by Sergei Lvovich Levitsky 1865 (The Di Rocco Wieler Private Collection, Toronto, Canada)

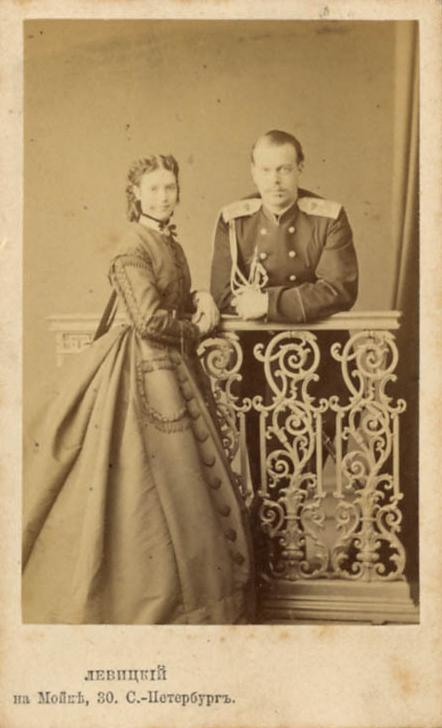
Tsarevitch Alexander later Alexander III and Princess Dagmar of Denmark, by Sergei Lvovich Levitsky 1865 (The Di Rocco Wieler Private Collection, Toronto, Canada)

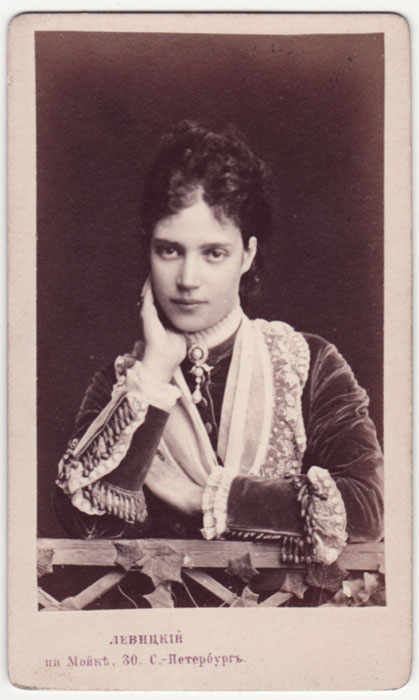
Maria Feodorovna, Princess Dagmar of Denmark Empress consort of Alexander III by Sergei Lvovich Levitsky 1870 (The Di Rocco Wieler Private Collection, Toronto, Canada)

Grand Duke Vladimir Alexandrovich, by Sergei Lvovich Levitsky 1870 (The Di Rocco Wieler Private Collection, Toronto, Canada)

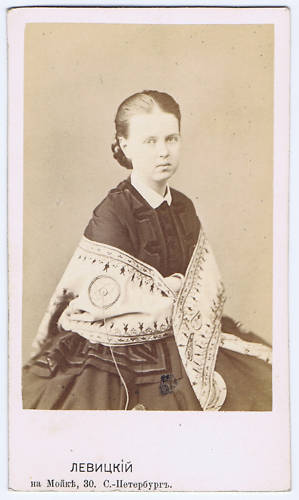
Grand Duchess Maria Alexandrovna, by Sergei Lvovich Levitsky 1865 (The Di Rocco Wieler Private Collection, Toronto, Canada)

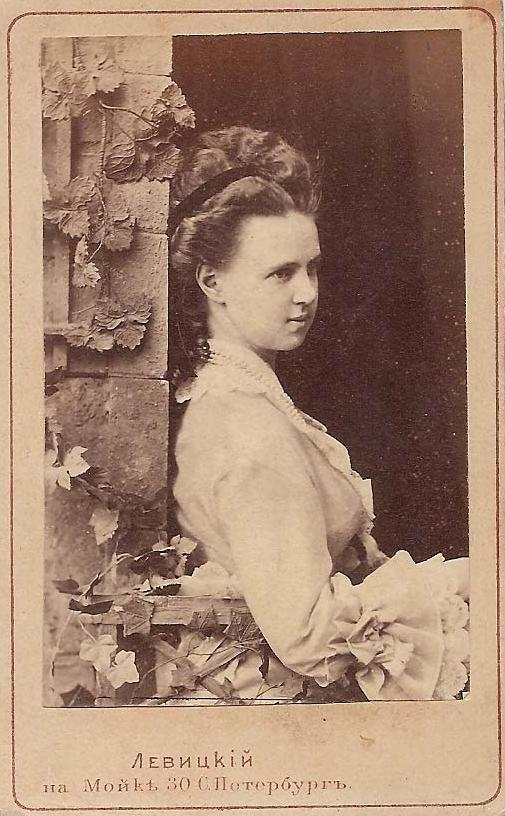
Grand Duchess Maria Alexandrovna, by Sergei Lvovich Levitsky 1870 (The Di Rocco Wieler Private Collection, Toronto, Canada)

Grand Duchess Alexandra Iosifovna, by Sergei Lvovich Levitsky 1855 (The Di Rocco Wieler Private Collection, Toronto, Canada)

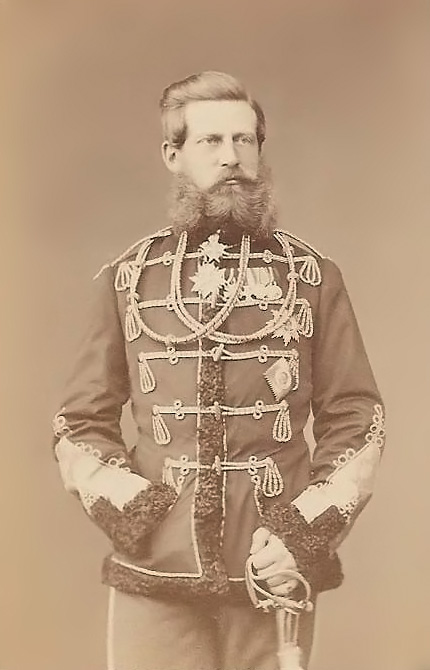
Frederick III as crown prince, by Sergei Lvovich Levitsky 1870 (The Di Rocco Wieler Private Collection, Toronto, Canada)

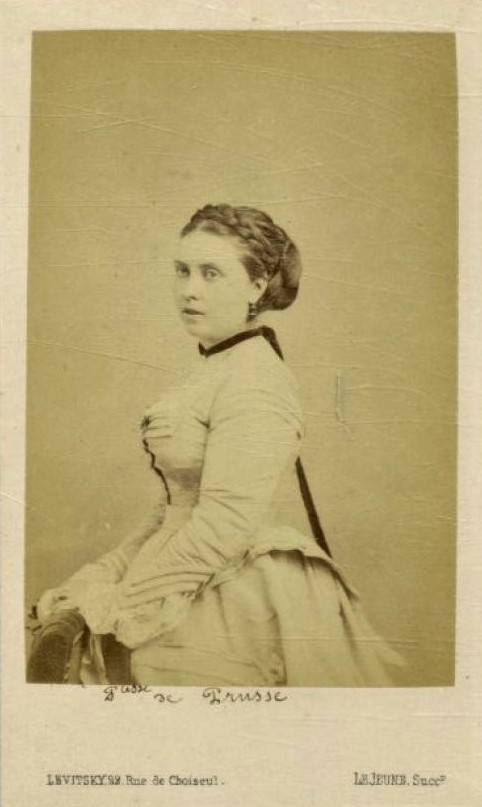
Victoria, Princess Royal, 1870 ('Le Jeune Succ^r')
