= Lewi =

Lewi is an alternative form of Levi (surname) or Levi (given name). It may refer to:

Given name

- Lewi Morgan, member of the British band Rixton
- Lewi Pethrus (1884-1974), Swedish Pentecostal minister
- Lewi Tonks (1897–1971), American quantum physicist
- Lewi White, British record producer

Surname

- Grant Lewi (1902–1951), American astrologer and author
- Joseph Lewi (1820-1897), American physician of Czech Jewish extraction
- Paul Lewi (1938–2012), Belgian scientist

== See also ==
- Levi (disambiguation)
- Levie (disambiguation)
- Levy (disambiguation)
- Levis (disambiguation)
- Lewis (disambiguation)
