= Moise Levy =

Moise Levy or variant, may refer to:

== People ==
- Moïse Lévy, Rabbinic leader in the Democratic Republic of the Congo
- Moïse Lévy de Benzion, Egyptian department store owner
- Moïse Levy, a French politician; see List of senators of Haute-Saône

== Characters ==
- Moise Levy, a fictional character from the Levy Stores film series films Levy and Company and The Levy Department Stores and The Marriages of Mademoiselle Levy

== See also ==
- Moishe Levy, U.S. jazz club entrepreneur
- Moses Levy (disambiguation), an alternate spelling of Moise Levy
- Moshe Levy (disambiguation), an alternate spelling of Moise Levy
- Morris Levy (disambiguation), an anglicized form of Moise Levy
- Moise (disambiguation)
- Levy (disambiguation)
- Levi (disambiguation)
