= DFM =

DFM may refer to:

- D. F. M. Strauss (born 1946), South African philosopher
- Department of Family Medicine
- Deputy First Minister (disambiguation)
- Design for manufacturability, engineering practice
- DetonatioN FocusMe, a Japanese professional League of Legends team
- Diesel Fuel Marine, also known as NATO F76
- Difluoromescaline, a psychedelic drug
- Digital First Media, newspaper publisher
- Dimensional Fact Model, a conceptual model for Data Warehouse design in computer science
- DFM Engineering, an American telescope manufacturer
- Dongfeng Motor Corporation, one of the Chinese "Big Four" state-owned automakers
- Dubai Financial Market, a stock exchange in the United Arab Emirates
- The Distinguished Flying Medal, a British military decoration
- Dynamic force microscopy, an alternative name for non-contact atomic force microscopy
