= Strauss =

Family name

- An ostrich as symbol of the town of Strausberg
- Pronunciation: English: /straʊs/ STROWSS; German: [ʃtʁaʊs]

Origin
- Origin: Middle High German from Old High German strūz
- Region of origin: Germania

Other names
- Variant forms: Strauß, Struz, Strutz, Straus, Strause, Struys, Struijs, Struis, Straussman, Strausman

Strauss, Strauß, or Straus is a common Germanic surname. Outside Germany and Austria Strauß is usually spelled Strauss (the letter "ß" is not used in the German-speaking part of Switzerland).

In classical music, "Strauss" most commonly refers to Richard Strauss or Johann Strauss II.

The name has been used by families in the Germanic area for at least a thousand years. The overlord of Gröna, for example, went by the name of Struz and used the image of an ostrich as his symbol. Examples of it could still be seen on the thousand-year-old church bell of that town. "Struz" or "Strutz" is the North-German form of the word "Strauss", which is the modern German word for ostrich.

Some of the earliest Jewish bearers of the name hailed from the Judengasse in medieval Frankfurt, where families have been known by the name of the houses they inhabited. All the houses had names and these included Haus Strauß, complete with an image of an ostrich on the façade.

When, for tax purposes, Napoleon made surnames obligatory in 1808, some other Jewish families decided to adopt the Straus(s) name.

== Notable people ==
=== A–F ===
- Adolf Strauss (general) (or Strauß 1879–1973), German colonel general
- Adriaan Strauss (born 1985), South African Springbok rugby union player
- Andrew Strauss (born 1977), South African born former English cricket captain
- Andries Strauss (born 1984), South African Springbok rugby union player; brother of Irish International Richardt Strauss and cousin of Springbok Adriaan Strauss
- Annette Strauss (1924–1998), philanthropist and former mayor of Dallas, Texas
- Anselm Strauss (1916–1996), American sociologist
- Anton Strauss (1858-?), German-Russian engineer, inventor and entrepreneur
- Astrid Strauss (born 1968), East German swimmer
- Aurora Straus, American racecar driver
- Barry S. Strauss (born 1953), American classicist and historian
- Bill Strauss (footballer) (1916–1984), South African born Scottish footballer and cricketer
- Billy Straus, American record producer and songwriter
- Botho Strauß (born 1944), German writer and playwright
- Bruce Strauss (born 1952), American boxer
- Carolyn Strauss (born 1963), American television executive and producer
- Christoph Straus (around 1580–1631), composer
- Claude Lévi-Strauss (1908–2009), French anthropologist
- D. F. M. Strauss (born 1946), South African philosopher
- Darin Strauss (born 1970), American writer
- David Strauss (David Friedrich Strauss or Strauß, 1808–1874), German theologian and writer
- Dominique Strauss-Kahn (born 1949), French politician, former managing director of the International Monetary Fund
- Dona Strauss (born 1934), British mathematician
- Donald B. Straus (1916–2007), American educator, author, political advisor
- Eduard Strauss (1835–1916), Austrian composer, son of Johann Strauss I
- Eric Strauss (born 1960), American biologist, professor at Boston College
- Ernst G. Straus (1922–1983), mathematician and assistant to Albert Einstein
- Erwin Straus (1891–1975), phenomenologist and neurologist of European origin
- Fabio Strauss (born 1994), Austrian footballer
- Ferdinand Strauss, The founder of the mechanical toy industry in America
- Franz Josef Strauss (or Strauß, 1915–1988), German politician (CSU)
- Franz Strauss (1822–1905), German horn player and composer, father of Richard Strauss

=== G–L ===
- Gustave Louis Maurice Strauss (c. 1807–1887), British writer
- Harry L. Straus, (1896–1949), American electrical engineer, horse and cattle breeder, sportsman, entrepreneur and computer pioneer
- Harry Strauss (1909–1941), contract killer for Murder, Inc. in the 1930s
- Henry Strauss, 1st Baron Conesford (1892–1974), member of the British Parliament from 1935 to 1955
- Herbert A. Strauss (1918–2005), German-born American historian
- Herbert D. Strauss (1909–1973), American businessman
- Herbert L. Strauss (1936–2014), German-American chemist
- Hugo Strauß (1907–1941), German rower
- Isaac Lobe Straus (1871–1946), American politician and lawyer
- Isidor Straus (1845–1912), owner of R. H. Macy Co., member of the U.S. House of Representatives, died when the steamer Titanic sank
- Ivan Štraus (1928–2018), Bosnian architect
- Jack Straus (1930–1988), American professional poker player
- Jael Strauss, contestant in America's Next Top Model, Cycle 8
- James Straus, American special effects artist and animation developer
- James Strauss (flautist) (born 1974), Brazilian flautist
- James D. Strauss (1929–2014), American theologian and professor
- Jason Strauss (born 1974), co-CEO and co-founder of Tao Group Hospitality
- Jesse I. Straus (1872–1936), son of Isidor Straus, president of Macy's, U.S. ambassador to France 1933–36
- Jessica Straus (born 1962), American voice actress
- Jo-Ann Strauss (born 1981), Miss South Africa in 2000
- Joe Straus (born 1959), politician from Texas
- Joe Strauss (1858–1906), American baseball player
- Johann Strauss I (1804–1849), Austrian composer (Radetzky March), father of Johann Strauss II, Josef Strauss, and Eduard Strauss
- Johann Strauss II (1825–1899), Austrian composer (Die Fledermaus, Blue Danube Waltz)
- Johann Strauss III (1866–1939), Austrian composer, son of Eduard Strauss
- John J. Strauss (born 1957), American producer and writer of film and television
- Jon Strauss, former president of Harvey Mudd College
- Josef Strauss (1827–1870), Austrian composer, son of Johann Strauss I
- Joseph Straus (born 1938), German patent scholar
- Joseph Strauss (disambiguation), several people, including:
  - Joseph Strauss (admiral) (1861–1948), American admiral
  - Joseph Strauss (engineer) (1870–1938), chief engineer in the building of the Golden Gate Bridge in California
- Josh Strauss (born 1986), South African rugby union player
- Julius Strauss, British journalist
- Julius Strauss (photographer) (1857–1924), American photographer
- Kai Strauss (born 1970), German electric blues singer, guitarist, and songwriter
- Karin Straus (born 1971), Dutch politician
- Karl Strauss (1912–2006), German-American master brewer and co-founder of Karl Strauss Brewing Company
- Kathleen N. Straus (born 1923), American educator and politician
- Kim Strauss (or Kurt Strauss) (born 1953), actor
- Jacobus Gideon Nel Strauss (1900–1990), aka Koos Strauss, Kosie Strauss, J. G. N. Strauss, South African politician and Leader of the opposition after Jan Smuts
- Leo Strauss (1899–1973), political philosopher
- Levi Strauss (disambiguation), several people, including:
  - Levi Strauss (1829–1902), Bavaria-born American entrepreneur and inventor of blue jeans
  - Claude Lévi-Strauss, French anthropologist and ethnologist
  - Dina Lévi-Strauss, French anthropologist and ethnologist, wife of the above
- Lewis Strauss (1896–1974) American businessman and chairman of the United States Atomic Energy Commission
- Lotte Strauss (1913–1985), American pathologist after which Churg–Strauss syndrome is named
- Ludwig Straus (1835–1899), Hungarian-Austrian violinist

=== M–Z ===
- Maayan Strauss (born 1983), Israeli artist
- Marianne Strauss (1923–1996), German Holocaust survivor
- Mark L. Strauss, New Testament professor
- Mark Strauss (journalist) (born 1966), American journalist
- Matt Strauss, Canadian politician
- Michael W. Straus (1897–1970), American government official
- Mikaela Straus (born 1998), stage name King Princess, American singer-songwriter and great-great-granddaughter of Isidor and Ida Straus
- Murray A. Straus (1926–2016), American sociologist and professor (University of New Hampshire), creator of the Conflict tactics scale
- Nathan Straus (1848–1931), German-American merchant and philanthropist
- Nathan Straus Jr. (1889–1961), New York journalist and politician
- Nita Strauss (born 1986), American rock musician
- Neil Strauss, (born 1969), American journalist and author
- Ofra Strauss (born 1960), chairperson of Israeli food products manufacturer Strauss
- Oscar Straus (composer) (1870–1954), Austrian composer of operettas
- Oscar Straus (politician) (1850–1926), Secretary of Commerce and Labor under President Theodore Roosevelt
- Paul Strauss (born 1964), politician from the District of Columbia
- Peter Strauss (born 1947), American actor
- Ralph Straus Regula (1924–2017), politician from Beach City, Stark County, Ohio
- Raphael Strauss (1830–1901), American painter
- Ray Strauss (1927–2013), Australian cricketer
- Ricardo Strauss (cricketer)
- Richard Strauss (1864–1949), German composer of operas and tone poems (Salome, Also sprach Zarathustra)
- Richard Strauss (physician) (1938–2005), subject of the Ohio State University abuse scandal
- Richardt Strauss (born 1986), South African rugby union player representing Ireland internationally; brother of Springbok Andries Strauss and cousin of Springbok Adriaan Strauss
- Robert Strauß (born 1986), German football player
- Robert Strauss (actor) (1913–1975), American actor
- Robert E Strauss (born 1983), American professional wrestler using the ring name Robbie E
- Robert Schwarz Strauss (1918–2014), American diplomat
- Roberto Strauss (born 1952), Mexican Olympic swimmer
- Roger Williams Straus Jr. (1917–2004), co-founder of book publishers Farrar, Straus and Giroux
- Rolene Strauss (born 1992), 2014 Miss South Africa and Miss World
- Ruth Strauss (born 1963), English squash player
- Sagi Strauss (born 1976), Israeli footballer
- Stephen Straus (1946–2007), American medical researcher
- Steven D. Strauss, American author and lawyer
- Sylvia Straus, pianist
- Thomas Strauß (born 1953), German rower
- Tiaan Strauss (born 1965), South African Springbok rugby union player
- Victoria Strauss (born 1955), fantasy author
- Walter Alexander Strauss (born 1937), American mathematician
- William Strauss, (1947–2007), American author, historian, playwright, lecturer and theorist
- William M. Straus, (born 1956), member of the Massachusetts House of Representatives
- Zoe Strauss, (born 1970), American photographer

== Fictional Strauss characters ==
- Mrs. Strauss, an elderly client of Jimmy McGill whom he assists with estate planning in the Better Call Saul episode titled "Alpine Shepherd Boy"
- Akabara Strauss, Vampire King from the manga The Record of a Fallen Vampire
- Dr. Arthur Strauss, fictional character who served as the original mentor of serial killer and cult leader Joe Carroll, lead character in the TV series The Following
- Artie Strauss, fictional character based on the real life murderer Richard Loeb of the infamous murder duo Leopold and Loeb
- Erin Strauss, fictional FBI section chief played by Jayne Atkinson in the TV series Criminal Minds
- Hans and Greta Strauss, inspiration for the fairy tale of "Hansel and Gretel" according to the Buffy episode "Gingerbread"
- Justice Strauss, fictional character from A Series of Unfortunate Events by Lemony Snicket
- Leopold Strauss, loan shark and bookkeeper of the Van der Linde gang in the 2018 video game Red Dead Redemption 2
- Maximilian Strauss, leader of the Tremere clan of vampires in Vampire the Masquerade: Bloodlines
- Judge Robert Strauss, fictional character who presided over Carrie Mathison's competency hearing in Homeland
- Roman Strauss, fictional conductor-composer from the 1991 psychological thriller Dead Again
- Tracy Strauss, fictional character from NBC's science fiction TV series Heroes by Tim Kring
- The Strauss siblings, Mirajane, Elfman, and Lisanna. All three are wizards and Fairy Tail guild members from the manga Fairy Tail by Hiro Mashima.
