= Moshe Levy =

Moshe Levy or Moishe Levi, or variant, may refer to:

- Moshe Levy (chief of staff) (1936–2008), 12th Chief of Staff of the Israel Defense Forces
- Moshe Levy (author) (born 1948), author and survivor of the Israeli destroyer Eilat
- Moshe Levy (athlete) (born 1952), Paralympic athlete
- Moshe Levy (chemist) (born 1927), Israeli professor of chemistry at the Weizmann Institute of Science in Rehovot, Israel
- Moshe Levy (soldier) (born 1946), Israeli half-track commander awarded the Medal of Valor
- Morris Levy (born Moishe Levy), U.S. jazz club entrepreneur

== See also ==
- Moise Levy (disambiguation), an alternate spelling of Moshe Levy
- Moses Levy (disambiguation), an alternate spelling of Moshe Levy
- Morris Levy (disambiguation), an anglicization of Moshe Levy
- Levy (disambiguation)
- Levi (disambiguation)
