= Levitt =

Levitt is an English variant Anglo-Norman surname or an Ashkenazi Jewish surname, and can refer to:

== People ==
=== In arts and entertainment ===
- Al Levitt (1932–1994), American jazz drummer
- Alfred Levitt (1894–2000), Russian–American painter and art historian
- Andrew Levitt (1970), American drag queen
- Alfred Lewis Levitt (1916–2002), American screenwriter blacklisted in the 1950s
- Gene Levitt (1920–1991), American film director
- Helen Levitt (1913–2009), American photographer
- Helen Slote Levitt (1916–1993), American screenwriter
- Igor Levit (born 1987) Russian-German pianist
- Joseph Gordon-Levitt (born 1981), American actor
- Saul Levitt (1911–1977), American playwright
- Steve Levitt, American actor

=== In science and academia ===
- Herschel Levit (1912–1986), American artist, designer, professor
- Malcolm Harris Levitt (b. 1957), British physical chemist
- Michael Levitt (biophysicist) (b. 1947), British biophysicist
- Norman Levitt (1943–2009), American mathematician
- Peggy Levitt, American sociologist
- Steven Levitt (born 1967), American economist, author of Freakonomics
- Theodore Levitt (1925–2006), American business theorist; coined the term "marketing myopia"
- Toby Levitt (1908–1958), South African-born endocrinologist

=== In other fields ===
- Albert Levitt (1887–1968), American judge, law professor, minister, and fringe political candidate
- Arthur Levitt (born 1931), chairman of the U.S. Securities and Exchange Commission
- Chad Levitt (born 1975), American football player
- Dorothy Levitt (1882–1922), English female racing driver
- Esther Levitt (1904–1987), Israeli activist
- Tom Levitt (b. 1954), British politician
- William Levitt (1907–1994), American real-estate developer, namesake of the Levittowns

== See also ==
- Levitt & Sons
- Leavitt (disambiguation)
