= Lebey =

Lebey is a surname with origins in Normandy, France. Notable people with the surname:

- Claude Lebey (1923–2017), French food critic
- Dummy Lebey (1896–1959), American college football player
- John C. Lebey (1905–2002), American architect

== See also ==
- Leber
- Levey
