= Arle Court Transport Hub =

Transport facility in Gloucestershire, England

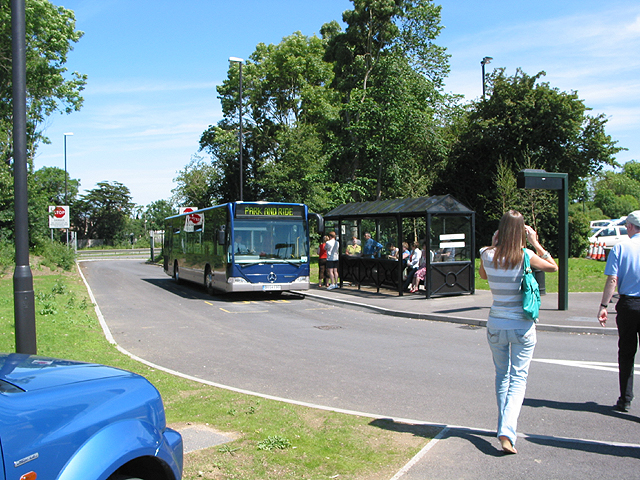
A bus at the facility in 2007

Arle Court Transport Hub (previously known as Arle Court Park and Ride) is a park and ride facility located on close to M5 junction 11 on the A40 on the outskirts of Cheltenham, England.

== History ==
In July 2024 a new multi-storey car park replaced the previous open car park. The new facility greatly increased the number of spaces and also provided users with 100 EV charging spaces, secure cycle parking, an information desk, enclosed waiting facilities, toilets, a changing place and real time departure information.

The existing 100 P&R ride bus service has now been increased to every 15 minutes and users of the service still get free parking.

== Facilities ==
The provides over 1000 parking spaces, regular bus services to Cheltenham Town Centre, Cheltenham General Hospital, Gloucester Royal Hospital and Gloucester City Centre. National Express call at the facility providing connections to Birmingham, Bristol Airport and the South West. The site also has secure cycle storage and bike repair station.

== Services ==
Stagecoach West took over bus services on 14 May 2018, operating route 93. Previously, it was operated by Bennetts. From 27 November 2022 to 25 November 2023, Bennetts took over the Park and Ride service, renumbered to route 100. This is after Stagecoach stopped operating the 93 service due to staffing issues. Stagecoach took over route 100 on 27 November 2023 after the contract was retendered one year later.

From August 2017, service 99 began calling at the park and ride. It runs from Gloucester Transport Hub to the centre of Cheltenham via Gloucestershire Royal Hospital and Cheltenham General Hospital.

== Future plans ==
In July 2021, Gloucestershire County Council announced plans to upgrade the park and ride facility at a cost of £20 million. The plans include a waiting room, secure bicycle parking, 100 electric vehicle charging points, and solar panels to power the site. A multistorey car park is also now being built, which will double the number of car parking spaces at the site, and will include other facilities including a waiting area and refreshments. The new car park is due to open in 2024.
