= De Levie =

De Levie is a surname. Notable people with this name include:

- Alvin F. de Levie, American lawyer and member of the Penn State Board of Trustees
- Elka de Levie (1905–1979), Dutch gymnast and Holocaust survivor
- Robert de Levie (born 1933), Dutch chemist

== See also ==
- Levie (disambiguation) § People
