= Morris Levy (disambiguation) =

Morris Levy or variant, may refer to:

- Morris Levy, an American music industry executive
- Morris S. Levy, an American film and television producer

== See also ==
- Moses Levy (disambiguation), a de-anglicized form of Morris Levy
- Moshe Levy (disambiguation), a de-anglicized form of Morris Levy
- Maurice Levy (disambiguation)
- Morris (disambiguation)
- Levy (disambiguation)
- Levi (disambiguation)
