= Levi Strauss (disambiguation) =

Levi Strauss (1829–1902) was founder of the first company to manufacture blue jeans.

Levi Strauss or Lévi-Strauss may also refer to:

== People ==
- Claude Lévi-Strauss (1908–2009), French anthropologist and ethnologist
- David Levi Strauss (1953-?), author and educator born in the United States of America
- Dina Lévi-Strauss (1911-1999), French anthropologist and ethnologist

== Places ==
- 22647 Lévi-Strauss, a main-belt minor planet

== Other uses ==
- Levi Strauss & Co. clothing company
- Lévi-Strauss (book), a book by Edmund Leach

== See also ==
- Levi (disambiguation)
- Levis (disambiguation)
- Strauss (disambiguation)
