= Arle, Cheltenham =

District of Cheltenham, Gloucestershire, England

Coordinates: 51.913°N 02.104°W

Arle
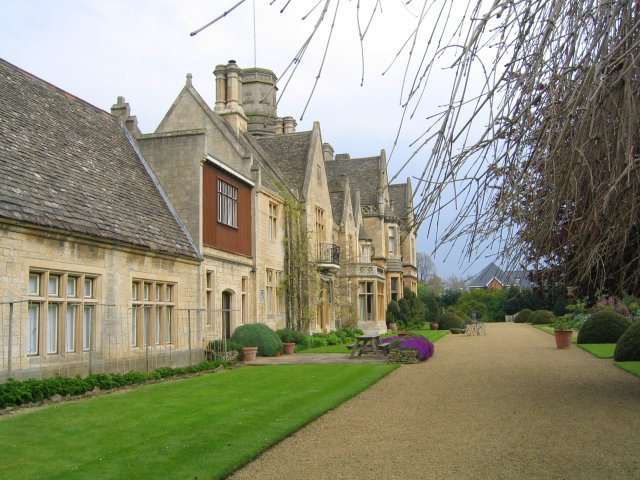
- Arle Court

- Location within Gloucestershire
- OS grid reference: SO9223
- Shire county: Gloucestershire
- Region: South West
- Country: England
- Sovereign state: United Kingdom
- Post town: Cheltenham
- Dialling code: 01242
- Police: Gloucestershire
- Fire: Gloucestershire
- Ambulance: South Western

Arle is a district of Cheltenham in Gloucestershire, England. It was historically a manorial estate which owned parts of the town now known as Hesters Way, Fiddlers Green, Arle and Benhall. The names Arle Court, Arle House and Arle Mill are relics of the historic past. Much of the area was market gardens and orchards in the early 20th century.

There were only 2 roads in the village of Arle before 1940.

== See also ==
- Arle Court Transport Hub
