= Maurice Levy =

Maurice Levy may refer to:

- Maurice Lévy (1838–1910), French engineer
- Maurice Lévy (physicist) (1922–2022), French physicist
- Sir Maurice Levy, 1st Baronet (1859–1933), British member of parliament for Loughborough
- Maurice Lévy (Publicis) (born 1942), French advertising magnate
- Maurice Levy (The Wire), a TV character on HBO's The Wire

== See also ==
- Michel-Maurice Lévy (1883-1965), French composer
- Morris Levy (disambiguation)
