= Leavis =

Leavis is a surname, and may refer to:

- F. R. Leavis (1895–1978), British literary critic
- Q. D. Leavis (1906–1981), English literary critic and essayist

== See also ==
- Beavis
- Leaves
- Leavisism, a form of literary studies named after F. R. Leavis
- Levis (disambiguation)
