= Moses Levy =

Moses Levy or Moses Levi, or variation, may refer to:

- Moses Levy (Pennsylvanian) (1757–1826), prominent Jew in Colonial America
- Moses Elias Levy (1782–1854), Jewish-Moroccan-American businessman and reformer
- Moses Levi, Chief Rabbi in Istanbul
- Moses Michael Levi Barrow (stagename: Shyne), Belizean politician and musician

== See also ==
- Moses Levy Building, Greek Revival building in Charleston, South Carolina
- Moise Levy (disambiguation), an alternate spelling of Moses Levy
- Moshe Levy (disambiguation), including Moishe Levi; an alternate spelling of Moses Levy
- Morris Levy (disambiguation), an anglicized form of Moses Levy
