= Camille Maurane =

French opera singer

Camille Maurane (November 29, 1911 – January 21, 2010), born Camille Moreau, was a French baryton-martin singer. His father was a music teacher and he started singing as a child in the Maîtrise Saint-Evode in Rouen. The sudden death of his mother and family upheaval meant a break of twelve years in regular singing.

== Career ==
Born in Rouen, his father, a music-teacher, had studied with Massenet, while his mother was an excellent amateur singer. He studied at the Paris Conservatoire in the class of Claire Croiza from 1936 to 1939. He began his professional career as a singer in 1940 at the Opéra-Comique in Paris. After his debut as the musician monk in Le Jongleur de Notre-Dame on 14 January 1940, he went on to create the following roles at the Opéra-Comique:

- the captain (Nèle Dooryn by Antoine Mariotte, 1940)
- Doria (Ginevra by Marcel Delannoy, 1942)
- a man, a peasant (Mon Oncle Benjamin by Francis Bousquet, 1942)
- a young man (Le Oui des Jeunes Filles by Reynaldo Hahn, completed by Henri Büsser, 1949).
- Un Soldat (Dolorès by Michel-Maurice Lévy, 1952)

He also sang in The Barber of Seville, La Basoche, Carmen, Lakmé, Louise, Madame Bovary, Madame Butterfly, Werther, Pelléas et Mélisande and oratorios like La Chanson du mal-aimé. He was occasionally billed under the name Moreau.

His voice was typical of the baryton-martin range (between baritone and tenor). He is famous for his interpretation of Debussy's Pelléas, for which he took part in three complete recordings of Pelléas et Mélisande. He is also regarded as one of the best interpreters of French mélodies, of which he left many recordings, since reissued on CD, and of Fauré's Requiem. His repertoire extended back to music of Rameau through to Arthur Honegger, Léo Ferré and other contemporaries.

A dedicated teacher, he taught at the Paris Conservatory until 1981.
