= Levy House =

Levy House may refer to:

- George Levy House, Mobile, Alabama; listed on the NRHP
- Henry Levy House, Yuma, Arizona; listed on the NRHP
- Henry Levy House, Oxnard, California; listed on the NRHP
- Blum House, also known as Levy House, Vicksburg, Mississippi; listed on the NRHP
- Levy House (Reno, Nevada), Reno Nevada; listed on the NRHP
- Harry Milton Levy House, Cincinnati, Ohio; listed on the NRHP
- Soloman Levy House, Columbus, Ohio; listed on the NRHP
- Gaylord-Levy House, Victoria, Texas; listed on the NRHP
