= Levis =

Lévis or Levis may be:

== Places ==
=== Canada ===
- Lévis, Quebec, a city
- Lévis (federal electoral district) (1967–2004), a federal electoral district in Quebec
- Lévis (provincial electoral district), a provincial electoral district in the Chaudière-Appalaches region of Quebec

=== France ===
- Levis, Yonne, a commune in Bourgogne-Franche-Comté

=== United States ===
- Levis, Wisconsin, a town
- Levis, Jackson County, Wisconsin, an unincorporated community

== People ==
- Levis (surname), a list of people
- Levis (given name), a list of people with the given name Levis or Lévis
- House of Lévis, a French noble family, including a list of people

== Military ==
- Fort Lévis, a former French fortification, now submerged in the St. Lawrence River, in what is now New York state, United States
- Lévis Forts, a series of three forts in Lévis, Quebec
- HMCS Lévis (K115), a 190 Royal Canadian Navy Flower-class corvette
- HMCS Lévis (K400), a 190 Royal Canadian Navy River-class frigate

== Other uses ==
- Levis (motorcycle), a now defunct British motorcycle manufacturer
- Lévis station, a ferry terminal and former railway station serving Lévis, Quebec
- Levis Formation, a geologic formation in Quebec

== See also ==
- Levis-Lauzon, a former city in Quebec
- Lévis—Lotbinière, a federal electoral district in Quebec
- Lévis-Saint-Nom, a commune in the Yvelines département
- Lurcy-Lévis, a commune in Auvergne
- Levi's, a brand of denim clothing
- Levi's Stadium, a stadium in Santa Clara, California, U.S.
- Leavis, a surname
- Levi (disambiguation)
