= Levie (disambiguation) =

Levie, a commune in the Corse-du-Sud department of France on the island of Corsica

Levie may also refer to:

== People ==
Given name

- Levie Jacob Fles or Louis Fles, (1872–1940), Dutch businessman, activist and author
- Levie Van Ouwerkerk (born 1991), Dutch-Israeli footballer
- Levie Vorst (1903–1987), rabbi of Rotterdam from 1946 to 1959 and chief rabbi from 1959 to 1971

Surname

- Aaron Levie, American entrepreneur
- Alexander Levie (1865–1955), Scottish veterinary surgeon
- Craig Levie (born 1959), Canadian ice hockey player
- Howard S. Levie (1907–2009), American legal expert on the law of war and the key draftsman of the Korean Armistice Agreement
- Michel Levie (1851–1939), Belgian politician

== See also ==
- State v. Levie, a decision of United States Hennepin County District Court
- Levi (disambiguation)
- Levy (disambiguation)
