= Strauss (disambiguation) =

Strauss is a common Germanic surname.

Strauss or Straus may also refer to:

== Companies ==
- Strauss Group, food manufacturer in Israel
- Straus Family Creamery, a California organic dairy in Marin County
- Karl Strauss Brewing Company, a San Diego, California-based beer business with a microbrewery and a chain of brewpub restaurants, co-founded by Karl Strauss
- Strauss Bascule Bridge Company of Chicago, an engineering firm founded by Joseph Strauss, chief engineer of the Golden Gate Bridge
- Straus Clothing, a North Dakota menswear retailer
- Engelbert Strauss, a German clothing company

== Buildings ==
- Straus Hall, dormitory housing first-year students at Harvard College named after Isidor Straus and Ida Straus
- Straus Education Building, at the University of Louisiana at Monroe
- Robert S. Strauss Center for International Security and Law, or Strauss Center, at the University of Texas at Austin

== Places and geographic features ==
- Strauss, an unincorporated community in Labette County, Kansas
- Strauss Airfield, a World War II airfield near Noonamah, Northern Territory, Australia
- Strauss Glacier, in Marie Byrd Land, West Antarctica
- Straus Park, a small landscaped park on the Upper West Side of Manhattan
- Straus Street, a north–south road in north-central Jerusalem
- Straussee, a lake in Strausberg, Brandenburg, Germany, occasionally translated as "Lake Straus"

== Other uses ==
- 22647 Lévi-Strauss, a main-belt minor planet
- Bobbs-Merrill Co. v. Straus, United States Supreme Court decision concerning the scope of rights accorded owners of a copyright
- Strauss chandelier, a crystal chandelier at the North Carolina Executive Mansion
- Straus flask, a type of Schlenk flask used in air sensitive chemistry
- Strauss–Howe generational theory, created by authors William Strauss and Neil Howe, identifies a recurring generational cycle in American history
- USS Straus (DE-408), a John C. Butler-class destroyer escort of the United States Navy
- USS Joseph Strauss (DDG-16), a Charles F. Adams-class guided missile armed destroyer of the United States Navy

== See also ==
- Strausse, a type of wine tavern in winegrowing areas of German-speaking countries that is only open during certain times of the year
