= Levis (surname) =

Levis is a surname. Notable people with the surname include:

- Adolph Levis (1913–2001), American businessman, philanthropist and inventor of the Slim Jim jerky snack food
- Albert J. Levis (born 1937), Greek psychiatrist
- Ariel Standen Levis (born 1929), Chilean senior hurdler, triple jumper and decathlete
- Brett Levis (born 1993), Canadian soccer player
- Carroll Levis (1910–1968), Canadian talent scout, impresario and radio and television broadcaster
- Charlie Levis (1860–1926), American Major League Baseball player
- Chris Levis (born 1976), Canadian lacrosse goaltender
- George Levis (1894–1980), American college basketball player and coach
- Jesse Levis (born 1968), American Major League Baseball scout and former catcher
- John Levis (born 1956), American English professor
- Joseph Levis (1905–2005), American fencer
- Larry Levis (1946–1996), American poet
- Oscar Levis (1898–1983), born Oscar Joseph Levy, Jamaican baseball pitcher in the Negro leagues
- Patrick Levis (born 1982), American actor
- Paetyn Levis (born 1999), American ice hockey player
- Will Levis (born 1999), American football player
