= Levee (disambiguation) =

Levee or levée comes from the French verb lever, meaning "getting up" or "rising". It has two main meanings:

- Levée (ceremony), formal ceremonial "risings" of a monarch from his bed each morning to meet with privileged people in relative privacy, which evolved into several different forms of state ceremonies in various countries
- Levee, a "rising" on a river bank, either one formed naturally by the periodic flooding of rivers or a man-made barrier created to control floods

== Events ==
- Levée en masse, a forced, mass conscription to raise a military force
- New Year's levee a social event hosted by various Canadian dignitaries and institutions on New Year's Day

== Places ==
- Levee Township, Pike County, Illinois
- The Levee, former red-light district in Chicago, Illinois

== People ==
- Barbara Poe Levee (1922–2013), American painter
- Henri Levée (1885–1943), French rugby union player
- Jeremiah Levee (1835–1908), American politician
- John Levee (1924–2017), American abstract artist
- Lorin Levee (1950–2012), American clarinetist
- Luca Levee (born 1997), Jamaican footballer
- M. C. Levee (1891–1972), American film executive

== Other uses ==
- Levee (horse), a Kentucky thoroughbred racehorse
- Levee Blues (1972), the second album from the American band Potliquor

== See also ==
- Levy (disambiguation)
