= Toby Levitt =

South African doctor

Tobias (Toby) Levitt
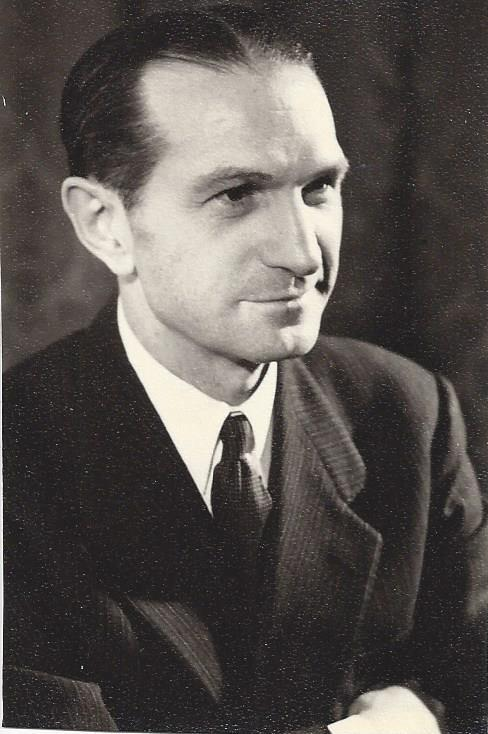
- Born: 2 February 1908; South Africa
- Died: 22 February 1958 (aged 50); Westminster, London
- Education: University of Cape Town (1930), MRCS (1934), LRCP (1934), FRCSI (1937), FRCS Ed (1946), FRCS (1948), Hunterian Professorship of the Royal College of Surgeons (1952)
- Years active: 1934-58
- Known for: Research and textbook about the thyroid
- Medical career
- Profession: Surgeon, Endocrinologist, Thyroid researcher
- Institutions: Middlesex Hospital, Bedford County Hospital, Gloucester Royal Infirmary, Paddington General Hospital, RAMC, New End Hospital, Royal Marsden Hospital
- Sub-specialties: Endocrinology, Thyroid
- Research: Thyroid disease, Endocrine Cancer

Tobias Levitt (2 February 1908 – 22 February 1958) was a South African medical doctor who wrote a textbook on the thyroid.

== Career ==
A distinguished student at the University of Cape Town, obtaining first class honours in anatomy (1929) and physiology (1930), Levitt was an outstanding anatomist and assistant lecturer in the university for a short time before continuing his medical education at the Middlesex Hospital in London, qualifying in 1934. After working as demonstrator of anatomy at the Middlesex, Levitt was house surgeon at Bedford County Hospital and Gloucester Royal Infirmary and surgical assistant medical officer at the Paddington General Hospital. He was a fellow of the Royal Colleges of Surgeons of Ireland (1934), Edinburgh (1946) and England (1948); he was almost unique in obtaining all three surgical Fellowships by examination in the days before the primary was "reciprocal."

During the Second World War Levitt served as a major as surgical specialist in the Royal Army Medical Corps, seeing service in North Africa and Italy – where he found a love of Italian art and architecture, to appreciate which he learned Italian. After the war he became surgical first assistant to the Thyroid Clinic at the New End Hospital, Hampstead, gaining wide experience in thyroid surgery and making his mark in researches in endocrinology, publishing several papers on the subject. The knowledge he gained at the New End thyroid clinic – where for a long time he was associated with Sir Geoffrey Keynes and Mr JE Piercy – culminated in his election to a Hunterian Professorship of the Royal College of Surgeons in 1952. On his appointment, he reportedly held his audience spellbound with his address – “a model of its kind” – on The Status of Lymphadenoid Goitre, Hashimoto's Disease and Riedel's Disease.

His huge experience and research culminated in the publication in 1954 of his magnum opus, The Thyroid: A Physiological, Pathological, Clinical and Surgical Study. The book, which was translated into Italian in 1955 and remained a standard textbook for several decades, provoked world-wide discussion.

He was lecturer in surgery to the Fellowship of Postgraduate Medicine at the New End Hospital for a number of years. Early in 1952 he had the first of several attacks of coronary thrombosis, which returned in 1955 during an extensive lecture tour in the United States under the auspices of the Kellogg Foundation and the International College of Surgeons. He battled bravely on for several years in spite of ill-health which was a constant concern to those who knew him, but about which he seldom spoke. His health precluded him from continuing work as an operating surgeon, but in spite of this disappointment he achieved happiness through his interest in endocrinology in relation to cancer, and was attached to the Royal Marsden Hospital in a research capacity where he dedicated himself to finding answers to various problems in this field. He used the Hunterian method, collecting the facts (recorded in his note-books in his neat handwriting), classifying them with enthusiasm before making his deductions, which he explained with lucidity. He was a very sick man in his final years and was at work on a book on carcinoma and the thyroid when he died, in the Charing Cross Hospital, of coronary thrombosis, on 22 February 1958 at the age of fifty years.

== Selected publications ==
- Levitt, T; Ball, L. A (1952). "Status of lymphadenoid goitre, Hashimoto's disease and Reidel's disease (Hunterian lecture, RCS.)". Ann R Coll Surg Engl. 10 (6): 369–404. PMC 2377507. PMID 14934009.
- Levitt, T (1951). "Evolution of the Toxic Thyroid Gland a Clinical and Pathological Study Based on 2114 Thyroidectomies". The Lancet. 258 (6691): 957–965. doi:10.1016/S0140-6736(51)91926-5.
- The Thyroid, a physiological, pathological, clinical, and surgical study. Edinburgh, Livingstone 1954. The 606-page text book was reviewed in "The Thyroid: A Physiological, Pathological, Clinical and Surgical Study". Annals of Internal Medicine. 41 (5): 178. 1954. doi:10.7326/0003-4819-41-1-178_1. PMC 1532317.

== Personal life ==
Levitt was one of four children born to Benzion (Ben) and Jenny Levitt, Jewish immigrants from Lithuania who ran commercial hotels in Franschhoek and Cape Town. Levitt's many obituaries (including in The Lancet, the British Medical Journal and the Medical Proceedings - Mediese Bydraes, a South African journal) describe him as a generous, sincere, modest and genial gentleman of high moral principles. An excellent and inspiring teacher, it was said of him that he poured out his life's blood for his students, often refusing financial recompense, and that many who had abandoned hope of ever passing their examinations found new hope with him. Levitt was a constant reader in the Library of the Royal College of Surgeons during the years between the end of the war and his final illness. He had practiced at 10 Harley Street. He never married, and was buried in the Jewish cemetery at Bushey, Watford.
