= Levey =

Levey is a surname. Notable people with the surname include:

- Andrew S. Levey (born 1950), American nephrologist
- Anton LaVey (born Howard Levey, 1930–1997), American author, musician and occultist
- Edgar C. Levey (1881–1962), American politician from California
- Elliot Levey (born 1973), English actor
- Gregory Levey (born c.1979), Canadian writer
- Jim Levey (1906–1970), American baseball player
- Michael Levey LVO (1927–2008), English art historian
- Mike Levey (1948–2003), American actor and journalist
- Richard Michael Levey (1811–1899), Irish composer, violinist and conductor
- Santina M. Levey (1938–2017), English costume and textile historian, conservator, and author
- Stanley Levey (c.1914–1971), American journalist
- Stuart A. Levey, American politician and manager

== See also ==
- Levey, Washington
- Levi (surname)
