= Esther Levitt =

Israeli activist (1904–1987)

Esther Levitt (Hebrew: אסתר לויט; 1904–1987) was an Israeli activist and community volunteer.

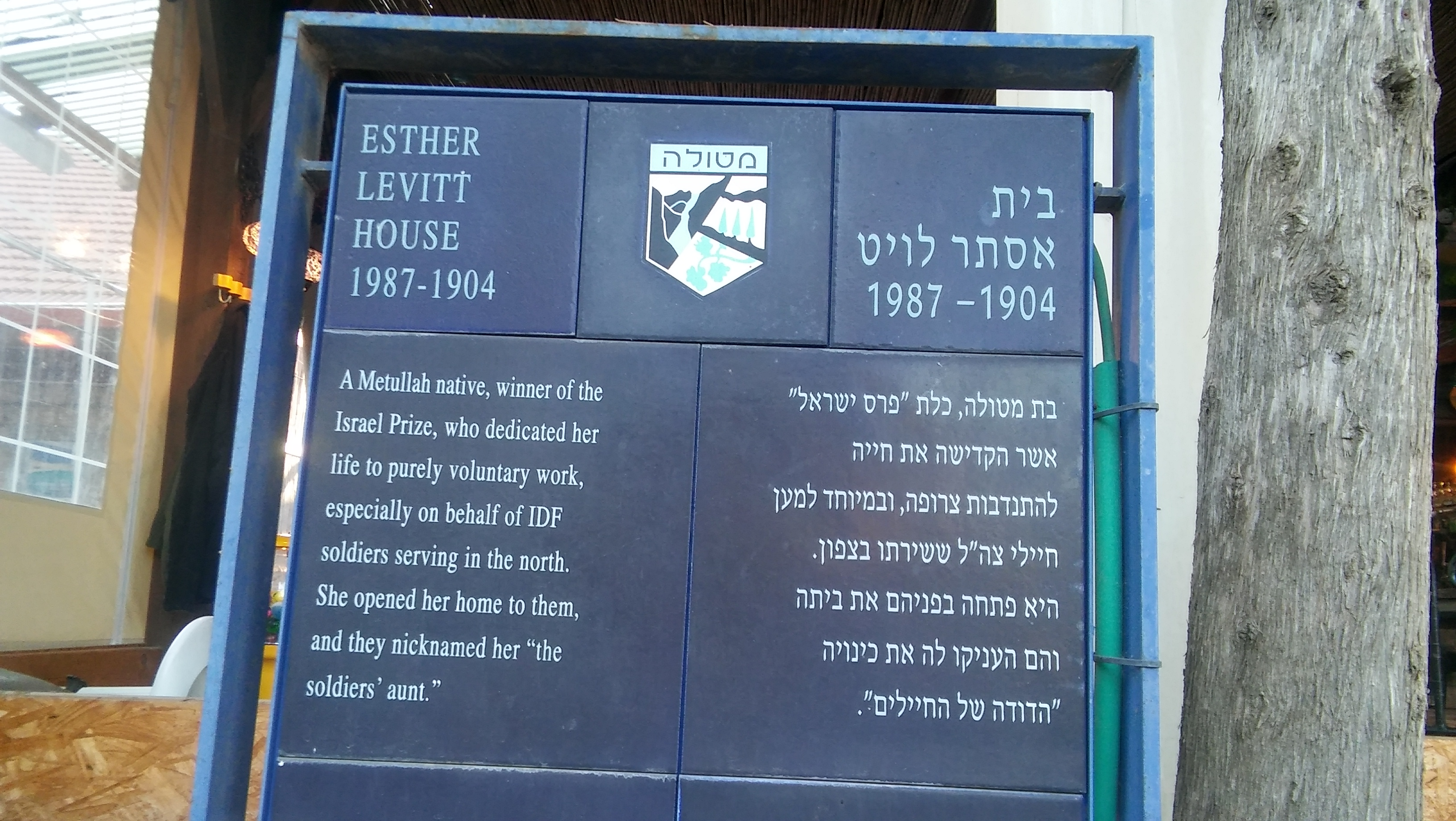
Plaque commemorating Esther Levitt

Levitt was born in Metulla. She was the chairman of WIZO Metulla. In 1977, she won the Israel Prize for her special contribution to Israeli society.

== See also ==
- Women of Israel
