= Eric Strauss =

American scientist (born 1959)

Eric G. Strauss
- Born: 17 April 1959 (age 67); Florissant, MO
- Education: Tufts University
- Known for: Behavioral ecology, Urban ecology, Science Education, Environmental studies
- Scientific career
- Fields: Biologist, Urban Ecologist
- Workplaces: Loyola Marymount University, Boston College, University of Massachusetts Boston
- Doctoral advisor: Benjamin Dane

Eric G. Strauss is an American scientist who is President's Professor at Loyola Marymount University (LMU) in Los Angeles, California. He is a member of the Biology Department at the Frank R. Seaver College of Science and Engineering and director of the Ballona Discovery Park. Founder of the Center for Urban Resilience (CURes), Strauss aims to create synergistic research and teaching opportunities within LMU as a resource to both government and neighborhoods throughout the greater Los Angeles area. Strauss is the founding editor of a web-based peer-reviewed journal, Cities and the Environment, which is funded in part by the USDA Forest Service and The LMU Library.

Strauss has served as the former director of the Environmental Studies Program at Boston College for over 15 years. With research specialties in animal behavior, urban ecosystem dynamics and science education, he has extended the model for faculty activities by helping to co-found the Urban Ecology Institute in Boston, which provides educational, research and restoration programs to underserved neighborhoods and their residents. He holds a PhD from Tufts University and is best known for his work with coyotes and his interests in Lyme disease. Strauss is also an expert on the success of the piping plover population of Cape Cod, MA.

== Selected publications ==
- Barnett, M., Lord, C., Strauss, E., Rosca, C., Langford, H., Chavez, D., and Deni, L. 2006. "Using the urban environment to engage youth in urban ecology field studies". Journal of Environmental Education 37(2): 3–11.
- Way, J. G., Ortega, I. M., and Strauss, E. G. 2004. "Movement and activity patterns of eastern coyotes in a coastal suburban environment". Northeastern Naturalist 11: 237–254.
- Way, J., Ortega, I., Auger, P., Strauss, E. 2004. "Eastern coyote denning behavior in an anthropogenic environment". Northeast Wildlife 56: 18–30.
- Strauss, E. & Lisowski, M. 2000. Biology, The Web of Life, 2nd Edition. Menlo Park: Benjamin Cummings.
- Strauss, E. 1997. Biology Alive! Host and technical advisor for a five-part television series on conservation and evolutionary biology. McLean Media/Addison Wesley. Menlo Park.
