= Gloucestershire Royal Hospital =

- Gloucestershire Hospitals NHS Foundation Trust
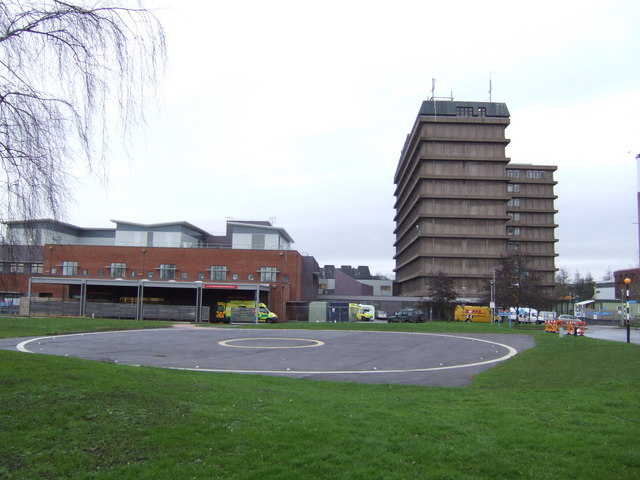
- Gloucestershire Royal Hospital with A&E to the left

- Shown in Gloucestershire

Geography
- Location: Gloucester, United Kingdom
- Coordinates: 51°51′55″N 2°13′50″W

Organisation
- Care system: Public NHS
- Type: General

Services
- Emergency department: Yes Accident & Emergency
- Beds: 683

History
- Founded: 1912

Links
- Website: www.gloshospitals.nhs.uk
- Lists: Hospitals in the United Kingdom

Gloucestershire Royal Hospital is an acute district general hospital on the Great Western Road in Gloucester operated by the Gloucestershire Hospitals NHS Foundation Trust.

== History ==
In 1912, construction on a 149-bed infirmary started on Great Western Road by the Gloucester Poor Law Guardians. Patients were transferred to the new building in 1914. The British Red Cross Society took over the west block for nursing war wounded in 1914 and the east block in 1915. The buildings were completed after the war. In 1930 the infirmary was transferred to the corporation and became known as Gloucester City General Hospital. On the introduction of the National Health Service in 1948 it was amalgamated with the Gloucestershire Royal Infirmary which had stood in Southgate Street. The hospital was rebuilt in the 1960s and eventually incorporated a new 11-storey tower, the work on which started in 1970 and was completed in 1975.

A major expansion of the hospital was procured under a Private Finance Initiative contract in 2001. The works were carried out by Bilfinger at a cost of £35 million and the new facility opened in 2005.

== Notable births ==
On 29 December 2010, the first great-grandchild of Queen Elizabeth II was born at the hospital, the daughter of Peter Phillips. On 29 March 2012, The Queen's second great-grandchild was born at the hospital. On 17 January 2014, The Queen's granddaughter Zara Tindall gave birth to a daughter at the hospital.

== Facilities ==
There are 683 beds at the hospital.
