= Andrew S. Levey =

American nephrologist (born 1950)

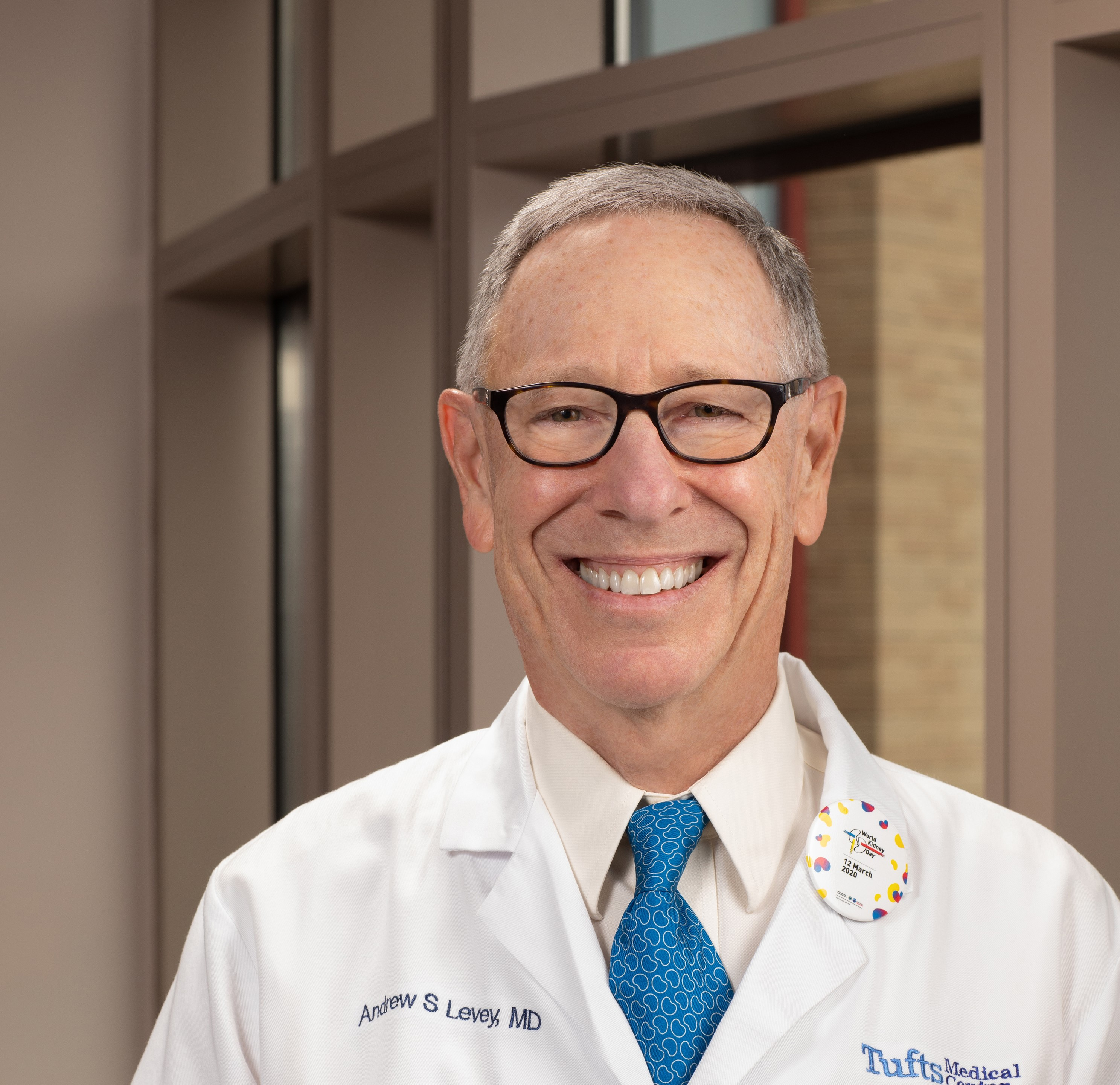
- Levey in 2021
- Born: September 16, 1950 (age 75); Parkersburg, West Virginia
- Education: University of Chicago; Boston University School of Medicine
- Known for: Developing estimates of Renal function to define and stage Chronic Kidney Disease and apply them in clinical practice, research and public health.
- Scientific career
- Fields: Nephrology, Epidemiology
- Workplaces: Tufts University School of Medicine, Tufts Medical Center

Andrew S. Levey (born September 16, 1950) is an American nephrologist who transformed chronic kidney disease (CKD) clinical practice, research, and public health by developing equations to estimate glomerular filtration rate (GFR) (renal function), and leading the global standardization of CKD definition and staging.

== Education and career ==
Levey graduated from the University of Chicago in 1972 with a Bachelor of Arts in Biological Sciences and graduated as a Doctor of Medicine (MD) in 1976 at the Boston University School of Medicine. He became a Professor of Medicine in the Tufts University School of Medicine in 1994, and was Chief of the Division of Nephrology from 1999 to 2017.

== Contributions ==
Levey is known for developing the most widely used equations to estimate GFR (renal function) globally. He pioneered work with the MDRD Study Equation, led the Chronic Kidney Disease Epidemiology Collaboration (CKD-EPI), which pooled measured kidney function CKD data from studies all over the world to develop equations to estimate kidney function from serum creatinine, cystatin C, and panels of metabolites and low-molecular-weight proteins. The 2009 creatinine equation with race and the 2021 creatinine equation without race to replace the 2009 equation are shown below:

eGFR=141×min(S_Cr/κ,1)^α×max(S_Cr/κ,1)^(-1.209)×〖0.993〗^"Age" ×1.018["if female"]×1.159["if Black"]

eGFR=142×min(S_Cr/κ,1)^α×max(S_Cr/κ,1)^(-1.200)×〖0.9938〗^"Age" ×1.012["if female"]

For both equations, α is -0.241 for females and -0.302 for males; min indicates minimum of Scr/k or 1, and max indicates maximum of Scr/k or 1

Levey is an authority on clinical practice guidelines in kidney disease. He chaired the U.S. National Kidney Foundation Kidney Disease Outcome Quality Initiative (KDOQI) Clinical Practice Guideline Workgroup on “Chronic Kidney Disease: Evaluation, Classification and Risk Stratification”. The recommendations from this workgroup transformed the way Kidney Disease was defined and staged globally. The guideline has been cited over 10,000 times in subsequent research publications. He led multiple KDOQI and Kidney Disease Improving Global Outcomes (KDIGO) guidelines which advanced the global recognition and care for CKD, hypertension, acute kidney injury, living kidney donor evaluation, and nomenclature.

Levey was a founding member of the Chronic Kidney Disease Prognosis Consortium (CKDPC), which includes over 80 cohorts and 10 million participants and has informed multiple clinical practice guidelines and regulatory policies.

Levey led the U.S. National Kidney Foundation task force on cardiovascular disease in chronic kidney disease, which led to the recognition by the American Heart Association of CKD as a risk factor for cardiovascular disease.

Levey co-chaired the U.S. Centers for Disease Control and Prevention expert panel to develop comprehensive public health strategies for preventing the development, progression, and complications of CKD.

Levey led scientific workshops sponsored by the U.S. National Kidney Foundation in collaboration with the U.S. Food and Drug Administration and European Medicines Association for the evaluation of Renal function as surrogate endpoints for clinical trials of kidney disease progression.

Levey was editor-in-chief for American Journal of Kidney Diseases, the official journal of the U.S. National Kidney Foundation, from 2007-2016.

== Awards ==
- Tufts University School of Medicine: Dean’s Award for Excellence in Teaching (1986), Dr. Gerald J. and Dorothy R. Friedman Professor of Medicine (1999), Distinguished Faculty Award (2004), Dr. Gerald J. and Dorothy R. Friedman Professor of Medicine Emeritus (2017), Zucker Family Prize for Research (2019), establishment of Andrew S. Levey Professorship, a faculty development/junior professorship to be awarded to an early career physician scientist in nephrology at Tufts University School of Medicine, fundraising conducted by a committee of Dr. Levey's former mentees and Division leaders (2025).
- Tufts University Graduate School of Biomedical Sciences: Sterling Visiting Professorship (2025)
- Tufts University: Faculty Recognition Award (1999)
- Boston University School of Medicine: Distinguished Alumnus (2013)
- National Kidney Foundation: President's Award (1998), Garabed Eknoyan Award (2002) and David M. Hume Award (2012)
- American Society of Nephrology: Belding H. Scribner Award (2013)
- Association of American Physicians: Member (2016)
- European Renal Association: Honorary Membership (2020)
- Web of Science High Cited Researcher Thomson Reuters (now Clarivate Analytics) (2014-2022)

== Personal ==
Levey is married to Roberta Falke, MD. In 2009 he donated a kidney to her via a 3-pair transplant.
