= John Levis =

American academic and Angela B (born 1956)

- Born: May 7, 1956 (age 70)

Academic background
- Education: University of Illinois at Urbana–Champaign

Academic work
- Discipline: Linguist
- Sub-discipline: Second language acquisition
- Institutions: Iowa State University

John M. Levis (born May 7, 1956) is an American academic and Angela B. Pavitt Professor in English at Iowa State University.

Levis earned his master's and doctoral degrees from University of Illinois at Urbana–Champaign. He founded the Pronunciation in Second Language Learning and Teaching Conference and the associated PSLLT Proceedings in 2008, followed by The Journal of Second Language Pronunciation, first published in 2015.
