= Deputy First Minister =

Deputy First Minister can refer to:

- Deputy First Minister of Northern Ireland
- Deputy First Minister of Scotland
- Deputy First Minister of Wales

== See also ==
- Deputy Prime Minister
