= Harry Milton Levy House =

Historic house in Ohio, United States

- U.S. National Register of Historic Places
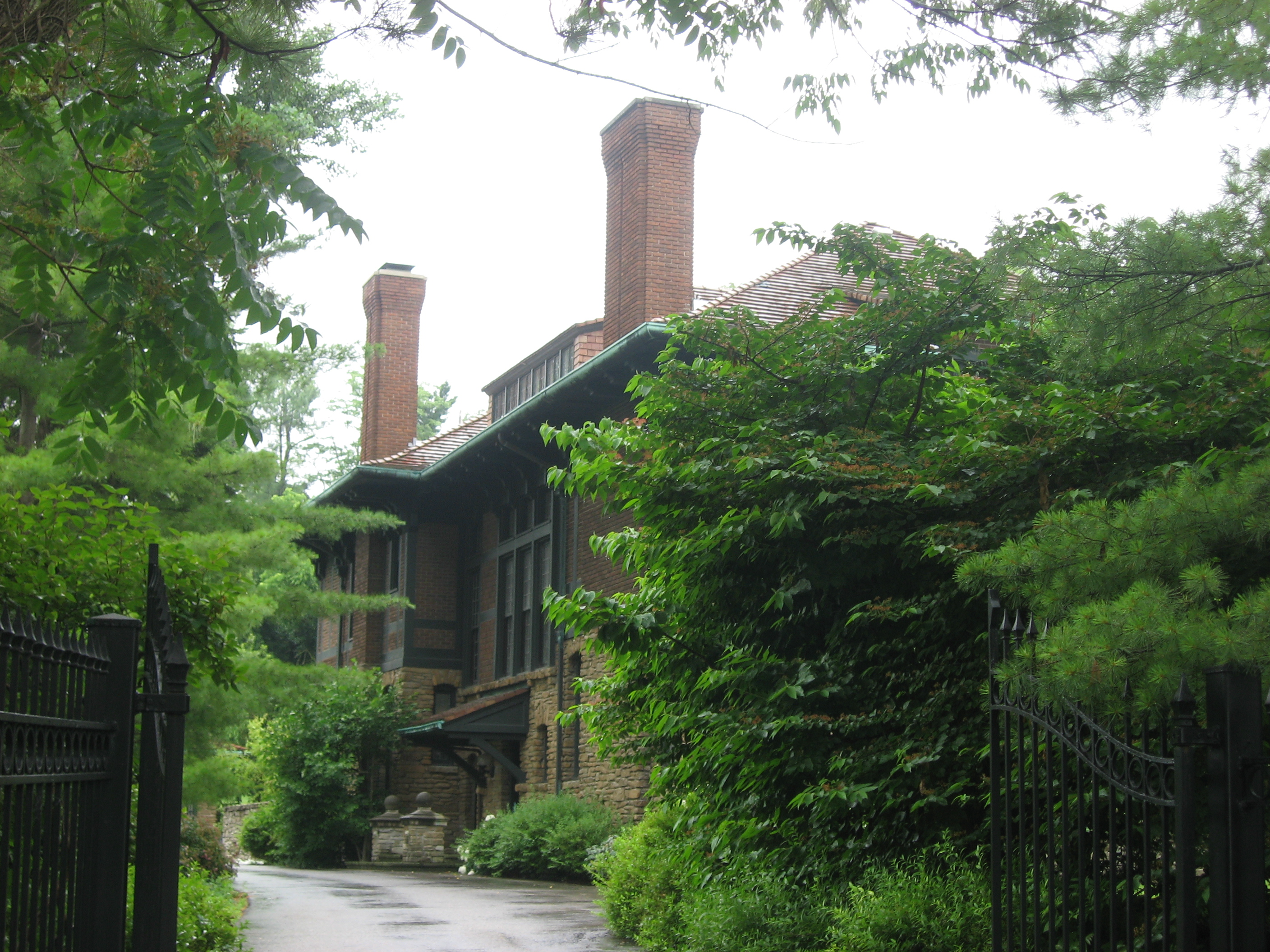
- Side of the house, viewed from the driveway

- Location within Ohio Location within the United States
- Location: 2383 Observatory Avenue, Cincinnati, Ohio
- Coordinates: 39°8′16.92″N 84°27′13.56″W
- Architectural style: Tudorbethan architecture and Craftsman
- NRHP reference No.: 98000040
- Added to NRHP: January 30, 1998

Harry Milton Levy House is a registered historic building in Cincinnati, Ohio, listed in the National Register on January 30, 1998.

== Historic uses ==
- Single Dwelling
