= Gloucestershire Hospitals NHS Foundation Trust =

- Type: NHS foundation trust
- Established: 1 January 2002
- Headquarters: Cheltenham General Hospital, Cheltenham
- Hospitals: Cheltenham General Hospital; Gloucestershire Royal Hospital
- Chair: Deborah Evans
- Chief executive: Kevin McNamara
- Staff: 7,438 FTE (2018/19)
- Website: www.gloshospitals.nhs.uk

Gloucestershire Hospitals NHS Foundation Trust runs Gloucestershire Royal Hospital, an NHS district general hospital in Great Western Road, Gloucester, England. It serves western and southern Gloucestershire and parts of Herefordshire. It also runs Cheltenham General Hospital.

The trust's vision is "Best Care for Everyone" and this is underpinned by their values of "Caring, Listening and Excelling".

== History ==
Gloucestershire Hospitals NHS Foundation Trust is a large acute trust, delivering acute hospital services from two general hospital sites in Gloucester and Cheltenham, and maternity services from Stroud General Hospital. The trust was formed in 2002 by a merger of Gloucestershire Royal and East Gloucestershire NHS Trusts, has an annual operating income of £550 million, 960 beds, over 150,000 emergency attendances and 800,000 outpatient appointments each year. The trust employs around 8,000 people, providing care for the population of Gloucestershire and beyond.

In 2017, the trust investigated the establishing of a subsidiary company. On 28 February 2018, the trust board approved the recommendations which resulted in the creation of Gloucestershire Hospitals Subsidiary Company (trading as Gloucestershire Managed Services), to which 675 support staff were transferred on 1 April 2018. The intention was to achieve VAT benefits, as well as pay bill savings, by recruiting new staff on less expensive non-NHS contracts. VAT benefits arise because NHS trusts can only claim VAT back on a small subset of goods and services they buy. The Value Added Tax Act 1994 provides a mechanism through which NHS trusts can qualify for refunds on contracted out services.

== Performance ==
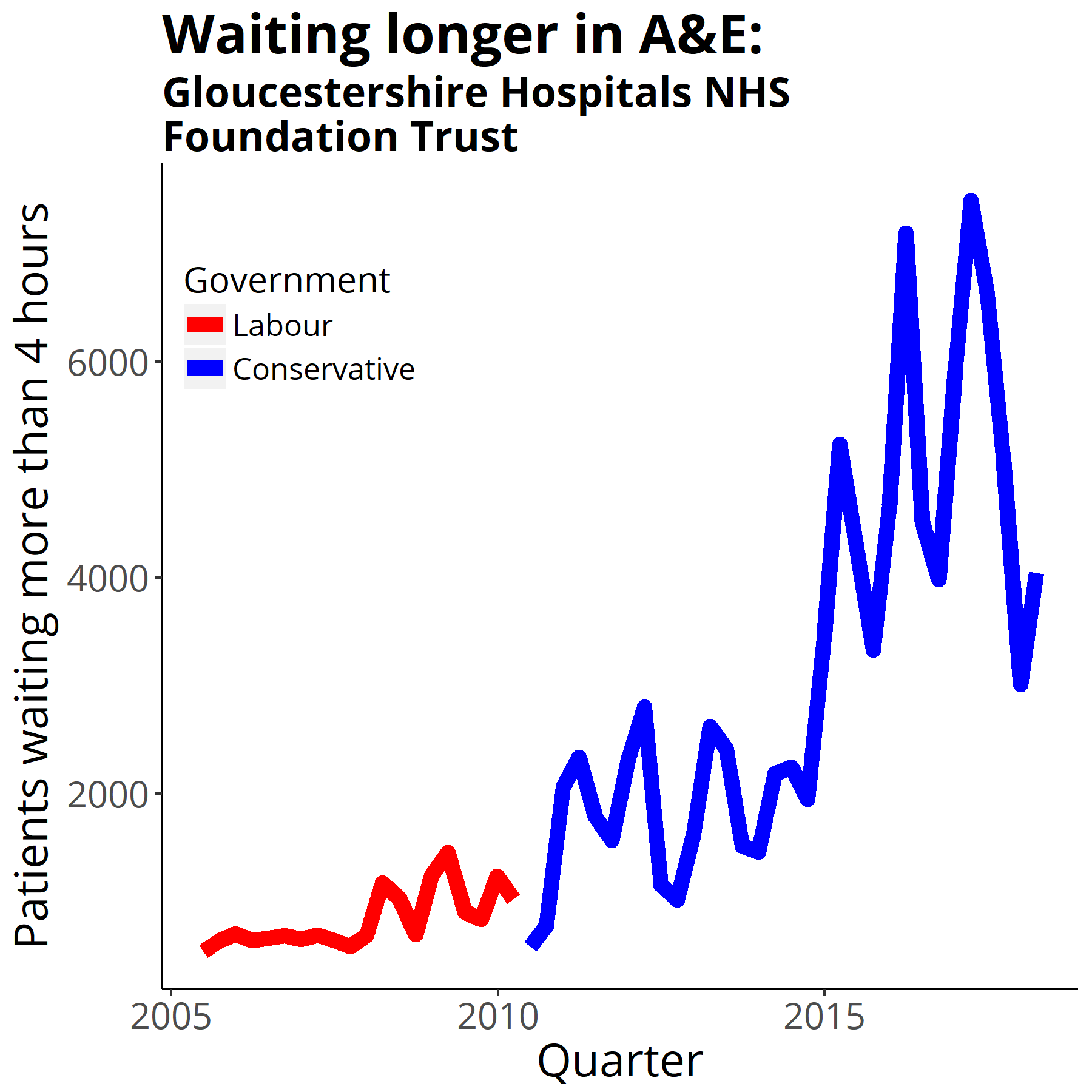
Four-hour target in the emergency department quarterly figures from NHS England Data from https://www.england.nhs.uk/statistics/statistical-work-areas/ae-waiting-times-and-activity/

The trust was placed into financial special measures in October 2016, after failings in financial governance were identified by the Board.

The Care Quality Commission inspected the trust in October 2018 and it was rated as 'Good' in the report published in February 2019, which marked a positive improvement on the rating "Requires Improvement" in 2017.

In July 2025, the British appellate courts upheld an earlier judgement describing the treatment by Kevin McNamara, Chief Executive, of an NHS staff member undergoing chemotherapy as "brutal, bullying and calculated". The chair of the trust board, Deborah Evans, has said she has no concerns about McNamara's appointment.

== Five-year strategic plan: 2019-2024 ==
In 2019, the trust set out a five-year strategic plan to transform hospital services and provide care for the next generation of patients at Gloucestershire Royal Hospital, Cheltenham General Hospital and Stroud Maternity Unit. The plan, called Our Journey to Outstanding, includes significant transformation that sets out how the organisation will achieve its vision of "Best Care for Everyone".

== See also ==
- Healthcare in Gloucestershire
- List of NHS trusts
