= State v. Levie =

State vs Ari David Levie was a decision of the Hennepin County District Court, File No. K2-03-106, considered and decided by Randall, Presiding Judge.

== Description ==
Prior to the start of his trial, defendant objected to the admission of a forensic report on the contents of his computer known as an EnCase Report. The district court determined that sections of the report were admissible. Later, at trial, the district court heard testimony from a number of witnesses, including: the police officer who conducted the investigation, and the retired police officer who authored the EnCase Report.

The retired police officer testified that he found an encryption program, PGP, on defendant's computer; PGP "can basically encrypt any file;" and, "other than the National Security Agency," he was not aware of anyone who could break such an encryption. Also it was admitted that the PGP program may be included on every Macintosh computer that comes out today.

== Appeal ==
On appeal, Appellant argues that the district court erred in admitting evidence of appellant's internet use and encryption capability of his computer Appellant also argues that the victim's testimony was too vague to support the charges against him and, specifically, the victim's testimony that she refused appellant's request to take nude photos of her was insufficient to prove an attempt. Further, Appellant argues that the court improperly referred to matters outside the record, and erred by basing its finding of guilt on simulated physical conduct that was not charged in the complaint. Finally, Appellant argues that all four counts were part of the same behavioral incident and, thus, separate sentences for each count were inappropriate.

Although he was found guilty on all charges, after appeal only two of the charges were dismissed as redundant charges. Ari was convicted and charged.

== Digital issues ==
=== Digital evidence ===
Definitions of digital evidence include: "any data stored or transmitted using a computer that support or refute a theory of how an offense occurred or that address critical elements of the offense such as intent or alibi" and "any data that can establish that a crime has been committed or can provide a link between a crime and its perpetrator"
Overall, digital evidence is all data that is stored in an electronic format that can be used to demonstrate in some way that a crime has or has not been committed. Examples of digital evidence are: incriminating e-mails, log traces to find whereabouts, web cameras, pictures or videos stored in a computer.
This case treats digital evidence as relevant to establish defendant's credibility. According to the Federal Rules of Evidence, evidence relevant to weight or credibility can be introduced.

=== Software as instrumentality ===
Instrumentality is about achieving something and using it to carry out a particular task. In this particular case encryption software was seen as a possible contribution to assist in masquerading the digital evidence.
Strong considerations can be made here since encryption capabilities where not used, but the court felt that it might and that was sufficient. This raises the possibility of capabilities there are unknown by general public be used to incriminate someone. The average computer user do not perceive all the software that is installed in his computer and its possibilities, new operating systems have the encryption functionality by default and therefore the operating system per se - which without the computer will not run – will be an instrument.

=== Encryption and Privacy ===
The main purpose of encryption is to change any data to a humanly unreadable form. Nowadays, encryption is seen as one of the key solutions to prevent the unauthorized disclosure of information.
Companies and governmental entities have been spending time and money implementing ways to fight cybercrime and increase awareness between internet users and general public with the purpose to reduce the occurrence of crimes such as Identity theft.
Mainly, one can say that encryption is about privacy. The right to a "safety zone" and privacy exists in the First and Fourth Amendment rights in the USA where a remarkable and recent privacy-based law has been approved, the Gramm-Leach-Bliley Act. In Europe the Lisbon Treaty describes the protection of fundamental data as fundamental human right.
While achieving privacy through the use of encryption seems to provide everyone with answers to decrease the disclosure of personal information, it benefits the possibility to conceal from authorities acts of terrorism, child pornography and others.
The use of encryption tools is becoming more and more disseminated; states are starting to make a crime "to use encryption". States like Illinois in USA are creating specific laws to handle this matter : "A person shall not knowingly use or attempt to use encryption, directly or indirectly, to:
(1) commit, facilitate, further, or promote any criminal offense;
(2) aid, assist, or encourage another person to commit any criminal offense;
(3) conceal evidence of the commission of any criminal offense;
(4) conceal or protect the identity of a person who has committed any criminal offense".

In this case the court considered achieving privacy as proof of intent to conceal i.e. credibility of the appellant is damaged with possibility of "conceal evidence of the commission of any criminal offense". By law it is the court responsibility to weight information and make the best judgment, the court "should rely in the last analysis upon [its] own experience, good judgment, and common sense" as described by the Minnesota Practice – Evaluation of testimony – believability of witnesses.
