= Justice Levy =

Justice Levy may refer to:

- Jon D. Levy (born 1954), associate justice of the Maine Supreme Judicial Court
- William M. Levy (1827–1882), associate justice of the Louisiana Supreme Court
