= Cheltenham General Hospital =

Hospital in Cheltenham, England

- Gloucestershire Hospitals NHS Foundation Trust
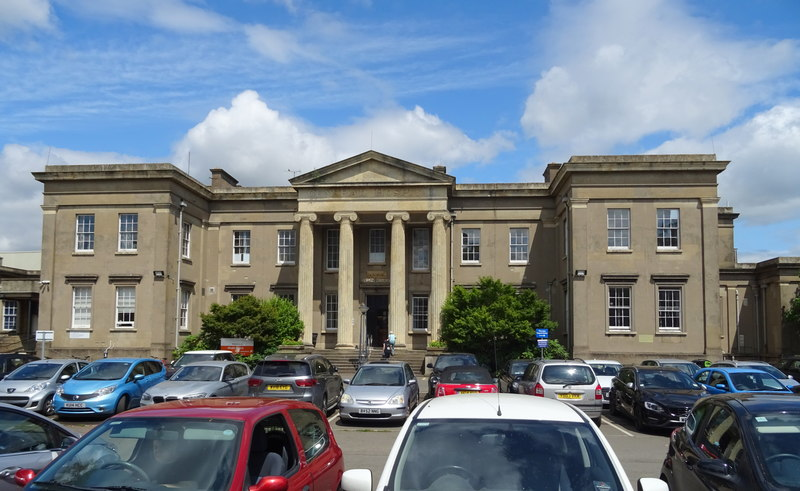
- View of the hospital on Sandford Road

- Shown in Gloucestershire

Geography
- Location: Sandford Road, Cheltenham, Gloucestershire, England
- Coordinates: 51.8925°N 2.0715°W

Organisation
- Care system: National Health Service
- Type: General

Services
- Emergency department: Yes

History
- Founded: 1813

Links
- Website: gloshospitals.nhs.uk

Cheltenham General Hospital is an NHS district general hospital in Cheltenham, Gloucestershire, run by Gloucestershire Hospitals NHS Foundation Trust. It provides general hospital services including Accident and Emergency. The Trust headquarters are based at the hospital in Alexandra House.

== History ==
The Cheltenham Provident Dispensary was founded in 1813, and after moving to Seward House, was renamed Cheltenham General Hospital in 1839. The new General Hospital building in Sandford Road, designed by D. J. Humphries and built between 1848 and 1849, has since served as the main hospital in Cheltenham. It took over the operation of the Cheltenham Ophthalmic Hospital c.1882, and joined the National Health Service in 1948.

The popular entertainer Eric Morecambe died at the hospital in 1984.

== Services ==
Cheltenham General Hospital provides general hospital services as well as some specialist services. There are 16 wards, a number of specialist departments and a minor injuries unit. The specialist Oncology Centre is a centre of excellence and the hub of the Three Counties Cancer Network. Additional specialisms include ophthalmology, with a Diabetic Eye Screening Unit.

== See also ==
- Healthcare in Gloucestershire
- List of hospitals in England

== Sources ==
- McCann, Graham (1999). Morecambe & Wise. Fourth Estate. ISBN 978-1857029116.
