= Joseph Strauss =

Joseph Strauss may refer to:

- Josef Strauss (1827–1870), composer
- Joseph Strauss (admiral) (1861–1948), officer of the United States Navy
  - USS Joseph Strauss, A U.S. Navy ship named for the admiral
- Joseph Strauss (engineer) (1870–1938), chief engineer of the Golden Gate Bridge
- Joe Strauss (1858–1906), baseball player

== See also ==
- Joe Straus (born 1959), Speaker of the Texas House of Representatives
- Joseph Straus (born 1938), German professor of law
- Franz Josef Strauss (1915–1988), German politician
