= Alfred Levitt =

Russian artist (1894-2000)

Alfred Levitt (August 15, 1894 – May 25, 2000), born Avraham Levitt, was a painter and an expert on prehistoric art who migrated to the United States in 1911 and was made a Chevalier of the Order of the Arts and Letters by the government of France for his studies of Paleolithic cave paintings. He was born in Starodub, Russian Empire.

Levitt was an anarchist whose friends included radicals Emma Goldman and Jack London as well as artist Marcel Duchamp. He and his wife were close friends with artist Margret Sutton, who lived with them till they died.

Twenty of his works are in the collection of the Metropolitan Museum of Art in New York City. He was also a MacDowell Colony Fellow in 1956. His papers are now in the Smithsonian Institution's Archives of American Art.
