= Leavisism =

Leavisism is a form of literary studies named after F. R. Leavis. Leavis was greatly influenced by Matthew Arnold and they share the notion that culture is the high point in civilization and concern of an educated minority. Leavis argues that prior to the industrial revolution England had an authentic culture of the educated elite. For Leavis it was a golden age of an organic community with a lived culture of Folk-song and Folk-dance.
