= Levy House (Reno, Nevada) =

Historic house in Nevada, United States

- U.S. National Register of Historic Places
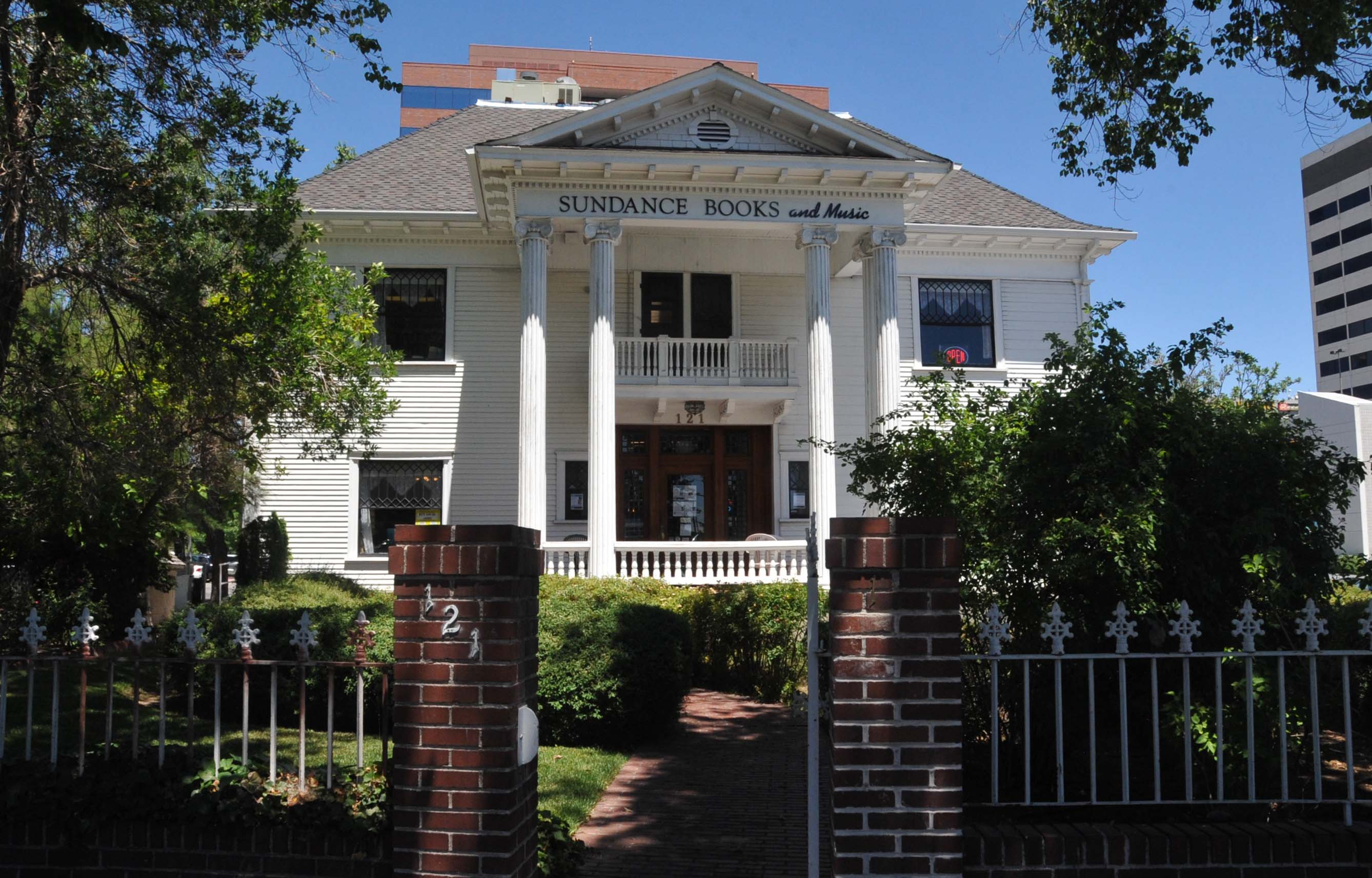

- Location within Nevada Location within the United States
- Location: 111-121 California Ave., Reno, Nevada
- Coordinates: 39°31′14″N 119°48′40″W
- Area: 0.4 acres (0.16 ha)
- Built: 1906
- Architectural style: Classical Revival
- NRHP reference No.: 83001119
- Added to NRHP: February 24, 1983

The Levy House, at 111-121 California Ave. in Reno, Nevada, is a historic Classical Revival-style house that was built in 1906. It was home of William Levy, a merchant and mining businessman.

It was listed on the National Register of Historic Places in 1983, qualifying as a high-quality example of the Classical Revival style, for its association with Levy, and as a significant component of local history.

The building was moved c. 1940, turning it 90 degrees and repositioning it on the lot.

From 2011 to 2024, the building housed Sundance Books and Music.
