= Leber =

Leber is a surname, and may refer to:

- Annedore Leber, German journalist and politician
- Ben Leber, American football player
- Georg Leber, German politician
- Jean Michel Constant Leber, French historian
- Julius Leber, German politician and resistance fighter
- Sylvie Leber, French-born Australian musician, founder of the early 1980s feminist band Toxic Shock
- Theodor Leber, German ophthalmologist who first described the diseases now known as Leber's congenital amaurosis and Leber's hereditary optic neuropathy
- Titus Leber, Austrian film director
- Walter Philip Leber, former Panama Canal Zone Governor
- Wilhelm Leber, Chief Apostle of the New Apostolic Church

== See also ==
- Leber, Washington
- Labs (Albanians) (Albanian: Lebër), an Albanian subgroup
