= Levis (given name) =

Levis or Lévis is a masculine given name borne by:

- Levis of Jerusalem, 2nd-century Jewish Christian bishop
- Lévis Brien (born 1955), Canadian politician in Quebec
- Levis Okello (born 1994), Kenyan footballer
- Levis Valenzuela Jr. (born 1988), aka No Way Jose (wrestler), American professional wrestler
