= Lévis station =

Railway station in Quebec, Canada

Coordinates: 46°48′37.15″N 71°11′13.56″W

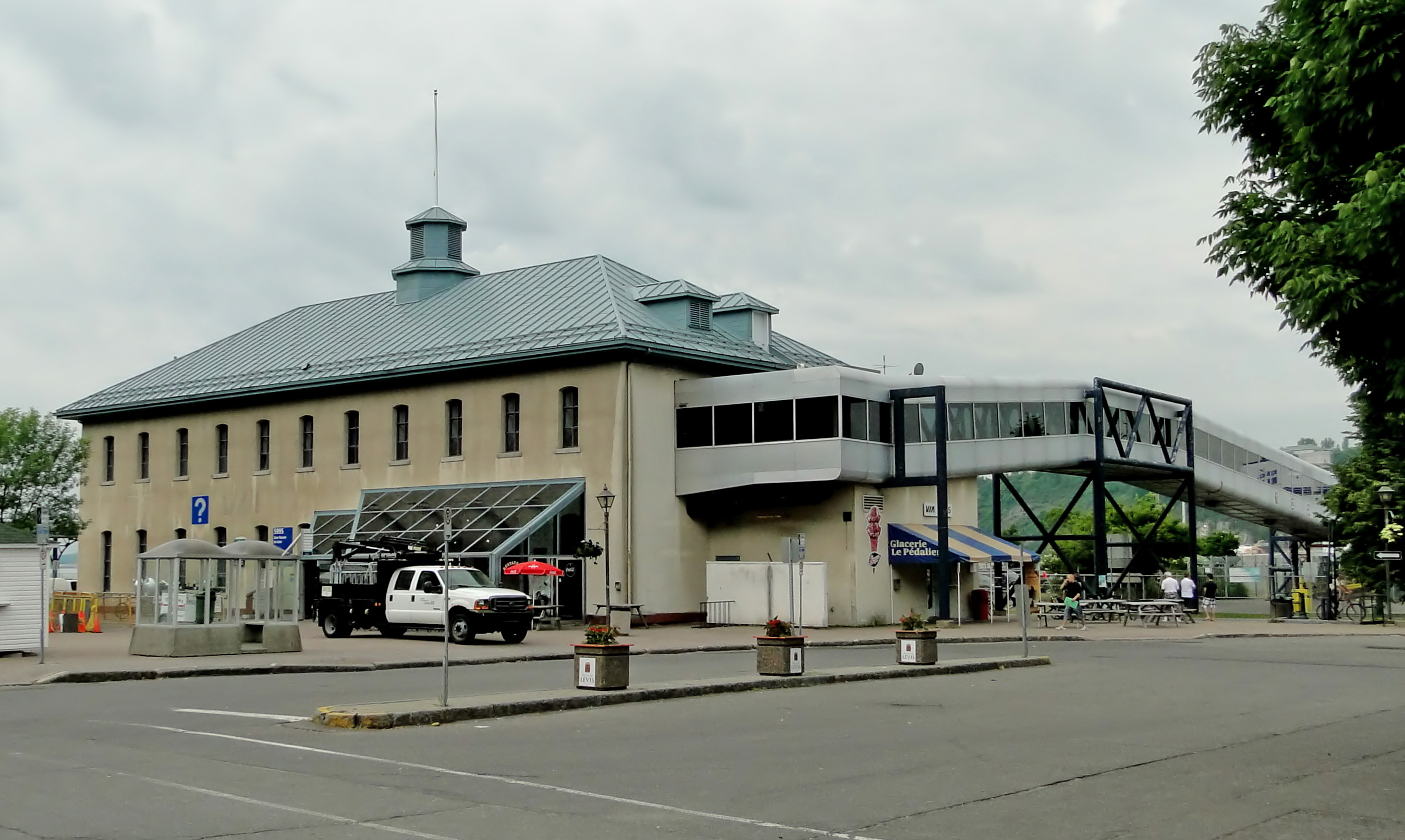
Lévis intermodal station in 2012

Lévis station (also known as Gare fluviale de Lévis and as Gare de l'Intercolonial) is a ferry terminal and former railway station in Lévis, Quebec, Canada at 5995, rue Saint-Laurent. It is also served by city buses operated by the Société de transport de Lévis. The Société des traversiers du Québec operates ferry service between this terminal and downtown Quebec City.

The station was built in 1864 as a meeting room for Lévis' city council. In 1884, it was purchased the Intercolonial Railway for use as a station, and was later used by Canadian National and Via Rail trains until CN abandoned its railway line in downtown Lévis. The final Via Rail from the station operated October 24, 1998. Today, the building serves as a ferry terminal, and also houses a bicycle rental facility and tourist information centre.

The former railway right-of-way is now a bicycle trail.

| Preceding station | Canadian National Railway | Following station |
|---|---|---|
| Hadlow toward Montreal | Montreal – Moncton | St. Joseph toward Moncton |
