= Moses Levy Building =

Building in Charleston, South Carolina, United States

Coordinates: 32°46′54.93″N 79°55′59.92″W

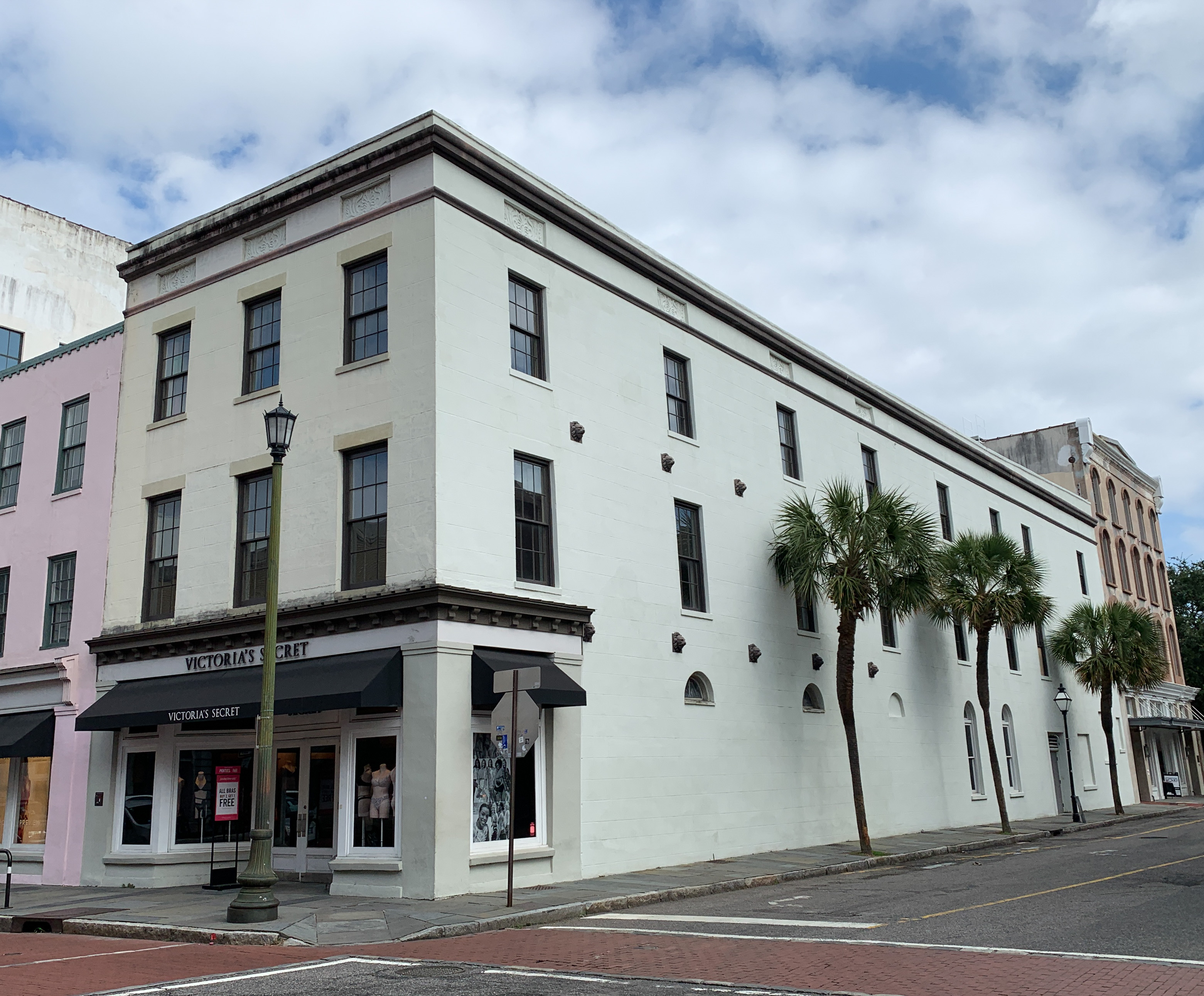
Moses Levy built 254 King St. following a devastating fire that struck the area in 1838.

The Moses Levy Building is a Greek Revival commercial structure located at 254 King St., Charleston, South Carolina.

In April 1838, a fire swept through the neighborhood around 254 King St. and destroyed a house belonging to Moses Levy. In June 1839, the South Carolina General Assembly created a program which financed the rebuilding of the area, and Moses Levy secured a "fire loan" to construct a three-story masonry building at the site. Levy died in 1839, and the house remained in his estate for fifty years until it was bought by two of his granddaughters. On March 3, 1909, seventy years after it was built, the house was sold outside the Levy family to Marx Lazarus.

Throughout the history of the building, it has housed commercial interests, starting with a jewelry. Around the turn of the twentieth century, rooms on the second floor were also used for meeting spaces by various organizations.

The three-story building is typical of the Greek Revival style, commercial buildings erected after the fire of 1838. It has a simple parapet along the roofline and cast iron grills inset near of the top of the front façade. The exterior stucco was scored to resemble stonework. The south side of the building has earthquake bolts with decorative lions head covers; the earthquake bolts repaired damage from the Great Earthquake of 1886.
