= D. F. M. Strauss =

South African philosopher

D. F. M. Strauss (born 1946, Bloemfontein) is a South-African philosopher and the world's leading expert on the theory of modal aspects, one of the core features of the thought of the Dutch philosopher, Herman Dooyeweerd, and the movement for Reformational philosophy.

Strauss studied under an adherent of Dooyeweerd's philosophy, Henk Van Riessen and attended some lectures of Dooyeweerd's brother-in-law, D. H. Th. Vollenhoven, professor of philosophy at the Free University in Amsterdam. Since that time Strauss has written voluminously in both Afrikaans and English on numerous contemporary philosophical themes.

In 1971 he was appointed as senior lecturer in philosophy at University of the Free State. From January 1976 he was promoted to associate professor and in October 1977 as professor and head of the Department of Philosophy. In 1994 he went to Canada, where as the first director of the Dooyeweerd Centre, he initiated the publication of the collected works of Herman Dooyeweerd in English. He returned to South Africa in 1997 and from 1 April 1998 to 31 December 2001 was dean of the new Faculty of Humanities at the UOFS. Apart from 15 independent publications, 35 international conference papers and 20 contributions to collected works, he has published about 240 articles in national and international journals.

Strauss served for two and a half years at the Dooyeweerd Centre at Redeemer University College, Ancaster, Ontario, Canada; he maintains a strong relation with the centre and serves as general editor of the Collected Works of Herman Dooyeweerd, published by Edwin Mellen Press (Lewiston, N.Y.).

In 2005 his work on the philosophical foundations of the modern natural sciences was published by Peter Lang Publishers – Paradigmen in Mathematik, Physik und Biologie und ihre philosophische Wurzeln (216 pp.) (Frankfurt am main). In 2006 Peter Lang published his work Reintegrating Social Theory – Reflecting upon human society and the discipline of sociology (310 pp.) (Oxford I New York). In 2009 his work: Philosophy: Discipline of the Disciplines appeared in Grand Rapids (Paideia Press – 715 pp.).

== Some articles published in English ==
Articles in English by D F M Strauss, Philosophia Reformata
