= Michel-Maurice Lévy =

French composer (1883–1965)

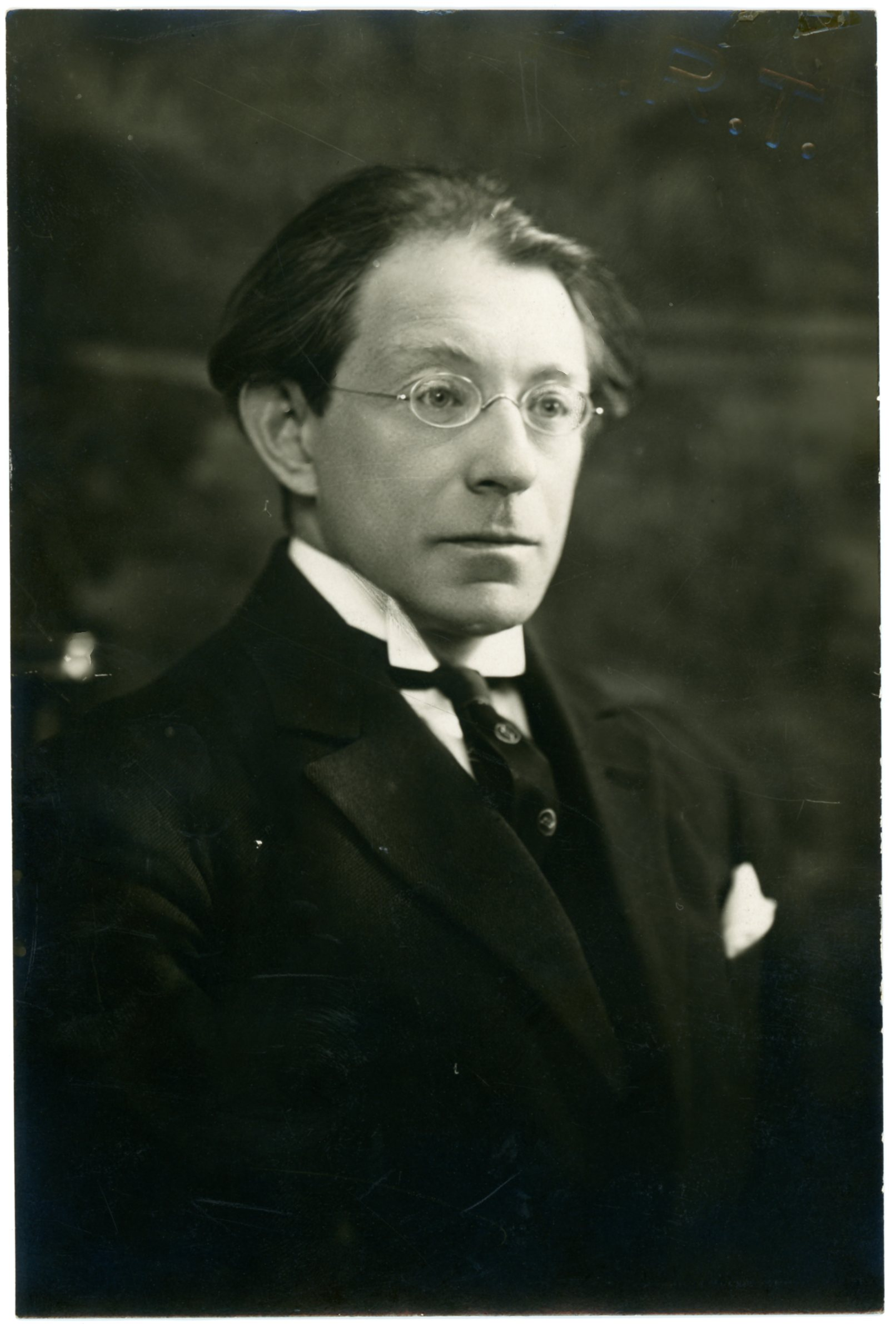
Michel-Maurice Lévy

Michel-Maurice Lévy (Ville d'Avray 1883-1965) was a French composer, best known for the opera Le Cloître. Lévy was born in Ville-d’Avray on 28 June 1883 and died in Paris on 24 January 1965. He studied at the Paris Cons. with Lavignac and Leroux. From 1920 to 1932 he was popular as a musical parodist in vaudeville under the name of Bétove.

== Recordings ==
Le Cloître Robert Massard, Adrien Legros, Jean Giraudeau, Andre Vessieres, Orchestre National de l'ORTF, Maurice-Paul Guiot 1962
