= Levi (disambiguation) =

Levi was, according to the Book of Genesis, the founder of the Israelite Tribe of Levi.

Levi may also refer to:

== People ==
- Levi (given name)
- Levi (surname)
- Levi (Book of Mormon), Jaredite king in the Book of Mormon
- Levi (New Testament), great-great grandfather of Jesus
- Levi II (fl. 3rd century), one of the amoraim
- Saint Matthew, referred to as Levi in the other Gospels
- Laevi, or Levi, a Ligurian people in Gallia Transpadana

== Places ==
- Levi, Estonia, a village in southwestern Estonia
- Levi, Finland, a ski resort in Finnish Lapland
- Levi, Kentucky, an unincorporated community in the United States
- Levi-Civita (crater)
- Rabbi Levi (crater)

== See also ==
- Levi Strauss (disambiguation)
- Leevi, a village in southeastern Estonia
- Levite
- Levis (disambiguation)
- Levy (disambiguation)
- Levey
- Levin (disambiguation)
- Levit
- Levitt
- Levitzki
