= Levy =

Levy, Lévy or Levies may refer to:

== People ==
- Levy (surname), people with the surname Levy or Lévy
- Levy Adcock (born 1988), American football player
- Levy Barent Cohen (1747–1808), Dutch-born British financier and community worker
- Levy Fidelix (1951–2021), Brazilian conservative politician, businessman and journalist
- Levy Gerzberg (born 1945), Israeli-American entrepreneur, inventor, and business person
- Levy Li (born 1987), Miss Malaysia Universe 2008–2009
- Levy Mashiane (born 1996), South African footballer
- Levy Matebo Omari (born 1989), Kenyan long-distance runner
- Levy Mayer (1858–1922), American lawyer
- Levy Middlebrooks (born 1966), American basketball player
- Levy Mokgothu, South African footballer
- Levy Mwanawasa (1948–2008), President of Zambia from 2002
- Levy Nzoungou (born 1998), Congolese-French rugby player, playing in England
- Levy Rozman (born 1995), American chess IM, coach, and content creator
- Levy Sekgapane (born 1990), South African operatic tenor
- Levy Lee Simon, American playwright, actor, director and screenwriter
- Levy Solomons (1730–1792), British-Canadian merchant and fur trader
- Levy Thorpe (1889–1935), English footballer
- Levy Tran (born 1983), American actress and model
- Levy Yakete (1965–2014), Central African Republic politician
- Levy baronets, extinct title in the Baronetage of the United Kingdom

== Places ==
- Levy, Missouri, a community
- Levy, South Carolina, an unincorporated community
- Levy County, Florida
- Levy Island, Crystal Sound, Antarctica

== Military organizations ==
A levy (plural levies) is a military force raised ("levied") in a particular manner. In the Roman legion this typically means "farmer soldier" militia units raised by conscription that provided most of light and heavy infantry composition—most of which were of poor training and little fighting ability—but not always.

In the British Empire, levies were units raised by local officials for local tasks, typically for local order and security.

- Conscript forces
  - Feudal levies a form of medieval conscription
  - Shire levy, a means of military recruitment in medieval England
  - Opolchenie, a Russian version of medieval conscription
  - Levée en masse, mass conscript armies, especially that of Revolutionary France
  - Volkssturm, a Nazi-German organized conscription during (last days of) WWII
- Locally raised forces within the British Empire
  - Aden Protectorate Levies (became Federal Regular Army of the South Arabian Federation, which then became the army of the People's Republic of South Yemen)
  - Iraq Levies
  - Kachin Levies
  - Pakistan Levies
    - Balochistan Levies
    - Malakand Levies
    - Swat Levies
    - Dir Levies
  - Trucial Oman Levies (became Union Defence Force of the UAE)

== Compulsory government measures ==
- To force someone into military or national service by means of conscription
  - Feudal levies a form of medieval conscription
  - Shire levy, a means of military recruitment in medieval England
- A legal action, where property of a judgment debtor is taken for public sale to satisfy a monetary judgment
- An imposition of a fine
- Tax levy, to take money in order to pay off a tax liability
- To wage war
- The statutory levy collected from bookmakers in the UK by the Horserace Betting Levy Board
- Private copying levy, a tax on recordable media typically allocated to the developers of "content"
- E-levy, tax bill in Ghana

== Businesses ==
- Levy Restaurants, brand in the United States and Canada
- Levy's (department store), former Arizona chain
- Léon & Lévy, French makers of stereoscopic views and postcards
- Henry S. Levy and Sons, former Brooklyn bakery
- Levy & Klein, former architectural firm in Chicago
- Michel Lévy Frères, Parisian publishing house

== Other uses ==
- 3673 Levy, an asteroid
- USS Levy (DE-162), destroyer escort

== See also ==
- Levy House (disambiguation)
- Clan MacLea/Livingstone (name)
- Levi (disambiguation)
- Levin (disambiguation)
- Levee (disambiguation)
- Justice Levy (disambiguation)
